= List of Brown University alumni =

The following is a partial list of notable Brown University alumni, known as Brunonians. It includes alumni of Brown University and Pembroke College, Brown's former women's college. "Class of" is used to denote the graduation class of individuals who attended Brown, but did not or have not graduated. When solely the graduation year is noted, it is because it has not yet been determined which degree the individual earned.

== MacArthur "Genius" Fellows ==
- Donald Antrim (A.B. 1981) – novelist, Elect Mr. Robinson for a Better World; recipient of the 2013 MacArthur Fellowship
- Greg Asbed (BSc 1985) – human rights strategist and labor organizer; recipient of the 2017 MacArthur Fellowship
- Kelly Benoit-Bird (BSc 1998) – Senior Scientist at the Monterey Bay Aquarium Research Institute; recipient of the 2010 MacArthur Fellowship
- Richard Benson (1961) – photographer, Dean of the Yale School of Art (1996–2006); recipient of the 2010 MacArthur Fellowship
- Lucy Blake (A.B. 1981) – conservationist, recipient of the 2000 MacArthur Fellowship
- John C. Bonifaz (A.B. 1987) – founder, National Voting Rights Institute, recipient of the 1999 MacArthur Fellowship
- Edwidge Danticat (M.F.A. 1993) – Haitian-American author, recipient of the 2009 MacArthur Fellowship
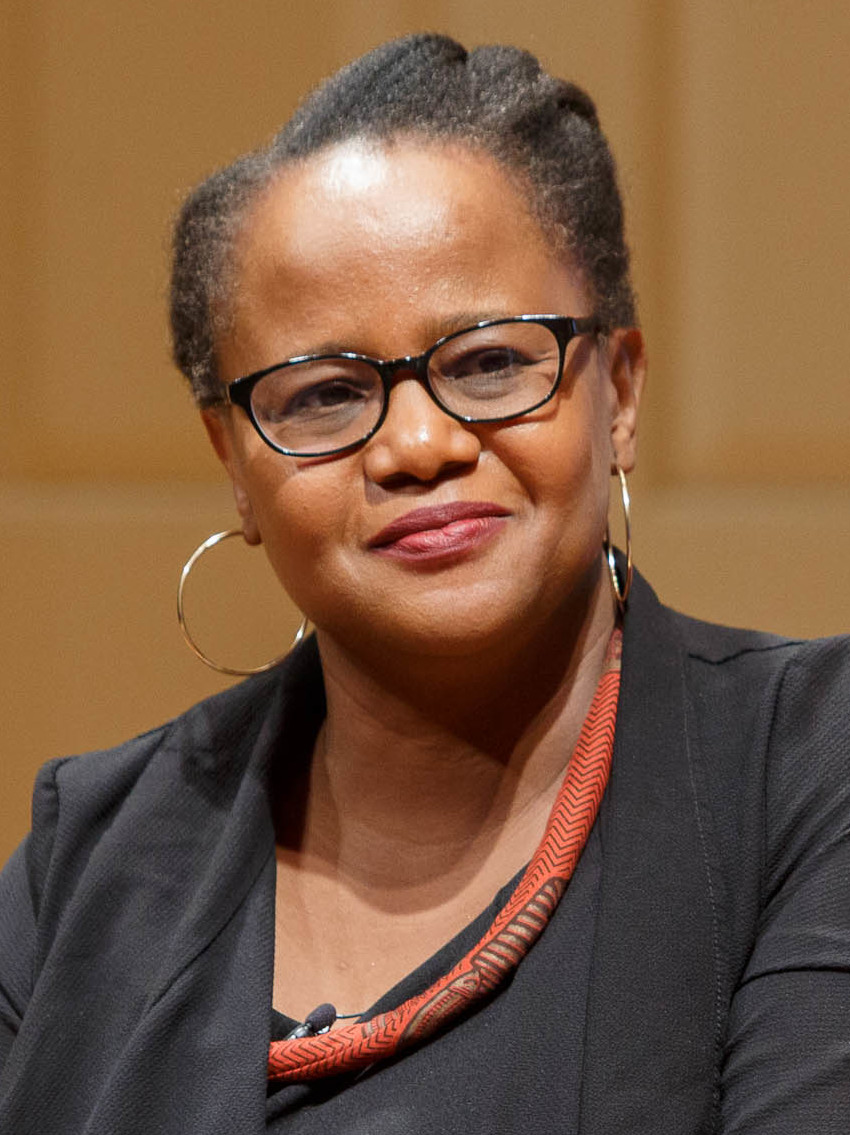
  Edwidge Danticat (1993)
- Michael H. Dickinson (Sc.B. 1984) – Esther M. and Abe M. Zarem Professor of Bioengineering and Aeronautics at the California Institute of Technology; recipient of the 2001 MacArthur Fellowship
- Richard Foreman (A.B. 1959) – playwright and avant-garde theater pioneer; recipient of the 1995 MacArthur Fellowship
- Rina Foygel Barber (Sc.B. 2005) – Louis Block Professor of Statistics, University of Chicago; recipient of the 2023 MacArthur Fellowship
- Jim Yong Kim (A.B. 1982) – 12th President of the World Bank, President Emeritus of Dartmouth College, and public health physician; recipient of the 2003 MacArthur Fellowship
- Ben Lerner (A.B. 2001, M.F.A. 2003) – poet; recipient of the 2015 MacArthur Fellowship
- David Lobell (Sc.B. 2000) – Gloria and Richard Kushel Director at the Center on Food Security and the Environment at Stanford University; recipient of the 2015 MacArthur Fellowship
- Monica Muñoz Martinez (A.B. 2006) – public historian; recipient of the 2021 MacArthur Fellowship
- Lynn Nottage (A.B. 1986) – first female playwright to win the Pulitzer Prize twice; recipient of the 2007 MacArthur Fellowship
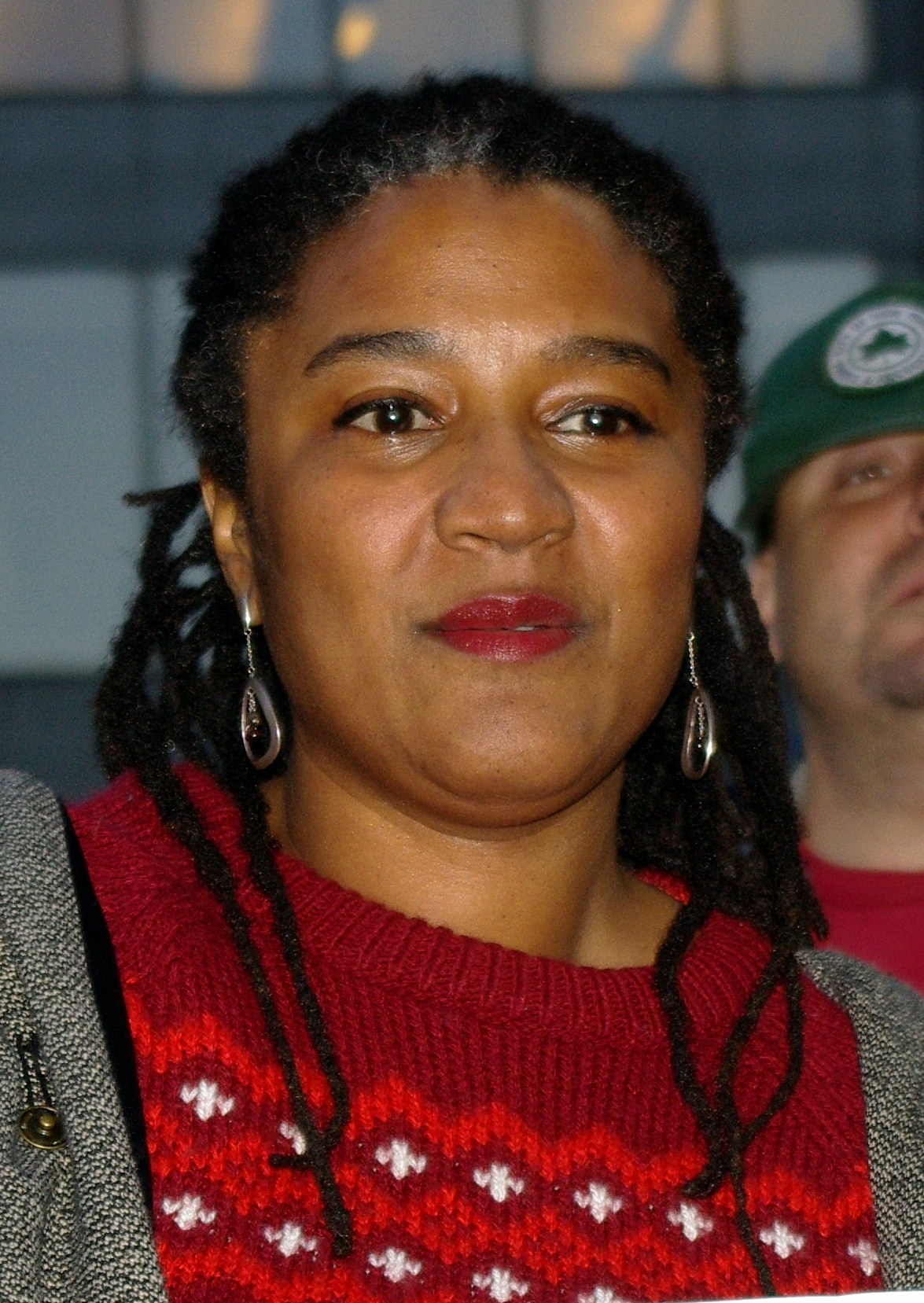
  Lynn Nottage (1986)
- Nawal M. Nour (A.B. 1988) – obstetrician and gynecologist, Kate Macy Ladd Professor at Harvard Medical School; recipient of the 2013 MacArthur Fellowship
- Lauren Redniss (A.B. 1996) – artist and writer; recipient of the 2016 MacArthur Fellowship
- Jennifer Richeson (Sc.B. 1994) – Philip R. Allen Professor of Psychology, Yale University; recipient of the 2006 MacArthur Fellowship
- Sarah Ruhl (A.B. 1997, M.F.A 2001) – playwright; recipient of the 2006 MacArthur Fellowship
- Sebastian Ruth (A.B. 1997) – violinist, recipient of the 2010 MacArthur Fellowship
- Joanna Scott (M.A. 1985) – author; recipient of the 1992 MacArthur Fellowship
- William Seeley (A.B. 1993) – professor of Neurology and Pathology, UC San Francisco, recipient of the 2011 Macarthur fellowship

== Academia ==
=== Academic administrators ===
- Jasper Adams (A.B. 1815) – president, College of Charleston; 1st president, Hobart College
- Vernon Alden (A.B. 1945) – 15th president, Ohio University
- Cynthia Robinson Alexander (A.B. 1978) – interim president, Savannah State University
- Elisha Andrews (1870) – 6th president, Denison University; 8th president, Brown University; 7th chancellor, University of Nebraska–Lincoln
- James Burrill Angell (A.B. 1849) – 3rd president, University of Michigan
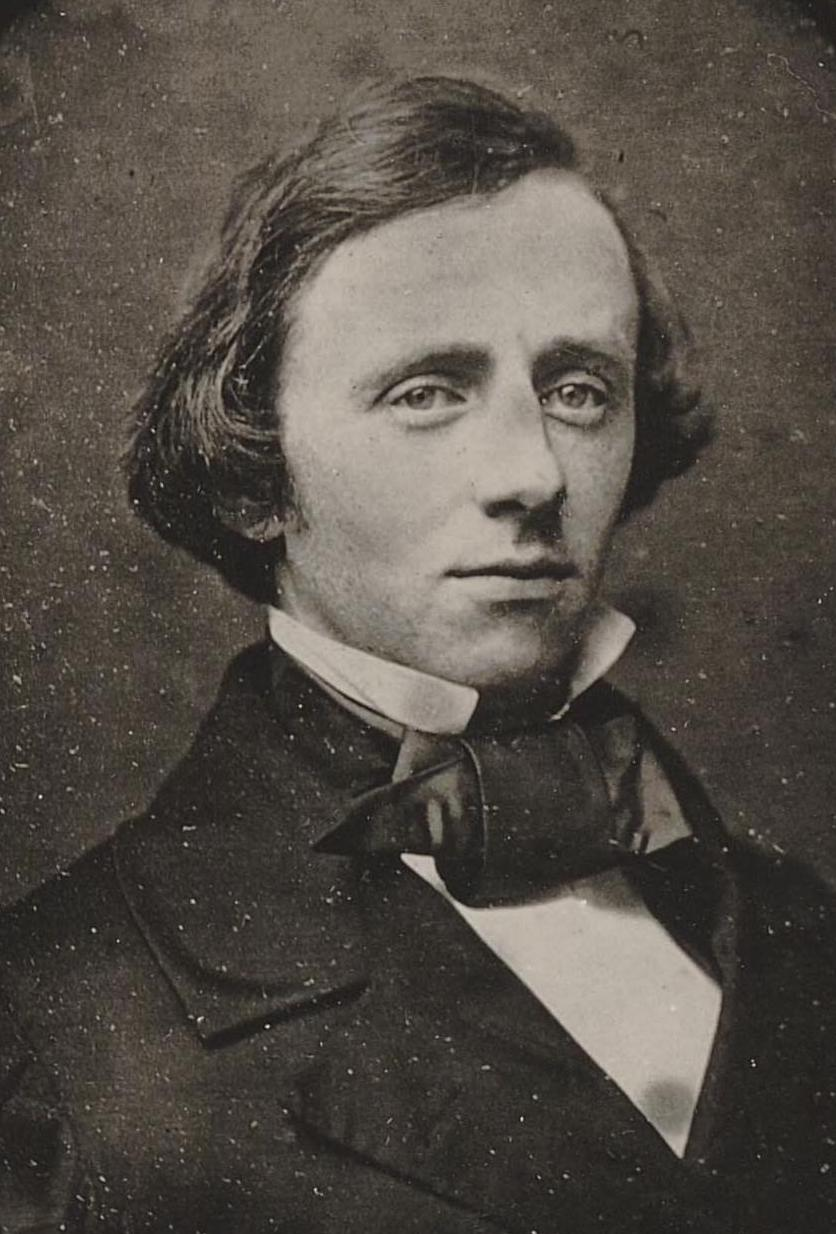
  James Burrill Angell (1849)
- Rufus Babcock (1821) – 2nd president, Colby College
- Silas Bailey (1834) – 2nd president, Franklin College; 3rd president, Denison University
- William Bakrow (1946) – 11th president, St. Ambrose University; interim president, Montserrat College of Art
- Clarence Barbour (1888) – 10th president, Brown University
- Jill M. Baren – 14th president of Lake Forest College (2022–2024)
- John Barlow (A.M. 1896) – interim president, University of Rhode Island
- Samuel Belkin (Ph.D. 1935) – 2nd president, Yeshiva University
- Ravi V. Bellamkonda (Ph.D. 1994) – dean, Pratt School of Engineering, Duke University (2016–2021); provost and executive vice president of Academic Affairs, Emory University (2021–)
- Lee Eliot Berk (A.B 1964) – 2nd president and namesake, Berklee College of Music
- Sarah Bolton (Sc.B. 1988) – 12th president, College of Wooster; former Dean of the College, Williams College
- Hermon Carey Bumpus (Ph.B. 1884) – 5th president, Tufts University
- Walter Burse (1920) – 2nd president, Suffolk University
- Dame Frances Cairncross (A.M. 1966) – rector, Exeter College, Oxford
- Alexis Caswell (1822) – 6th president, Brown University
- Gordon Keith Chalmers (A.B. 1925) – 13th president, Kenyon College; 9th President, Rockford College
- James Tift Champlin (1834) – 7th president, Colby College
- Liu Chao-han (Ph.D. 1965) – president, National Central University; Vice President, Academia Sinica
- Jeremiah Chaplin (1799) – founder and 1st president, Colby College
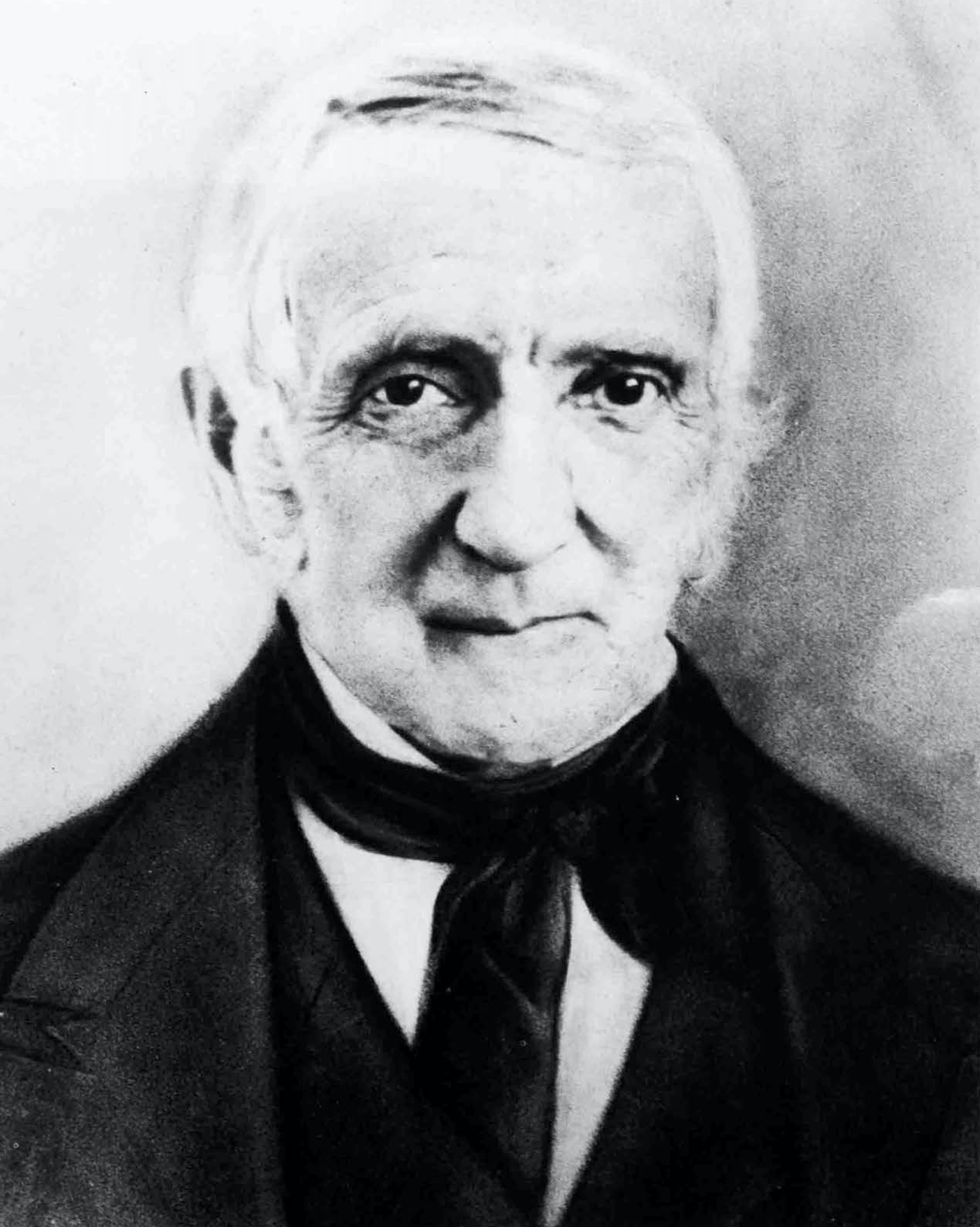
  Jeremiah Chaplin (1799)
- Oren B. Cheney (Class of 1840) – founder and 1st president, Bates College
- Barbara Chernow (A.B. 1979) – executive vice president of Finance and Administration, Brown University
- Aram Chobanian (A.B. 1951) – 9th president, Boston University
- Jay Coogan (A.B. 1980) – 16th president, Minneapolis College of Art and Design
- William E. Cooper (A.B., A.M. 1973) – 8th president, University of Richmond
- Robert A. Corrigan (A.B. 1957) – 12th president, San Francisco State University
- Glenn Cummings (M.A.T. 1984) – 13th president, University of Southern Maine
- Margaret Drugovich (A.M. 1988) – 10th president, Hartwick College; Interim President, Marietta College
- William Faunce (1880) – 9th president, Brown University
- Eliphaz Fay (A.B. 1821) – 4th president, Colby College
- William R. Ferrante (Sc.M. 1959) – acting president, University of Rhode Island
- Willbur Fisk (A.B. 1815) – 1st president, Wesleyan University
- Henry Simmons Frieze (A.B. 1841) – acting president, University of Michigan
- Joseph N. Gayles Jr. (Ph.D. 1963) – president, Talladega College
- John Wesley Gilbert (A.B. 1888, A.M. 1891) – president, Miles College
- Richard I. Gouse (A.B. 1968) – 1st president, New England Institute of Technology
- Edward Guiliano (1972) – 3rd president, New York Institute of Technology
- Marsha Hanen (A.B., A.M.) – 4th president, University of Winnipeg
- Thomas Hassan (1978) – 14th principal, Phillips Exeter Academy; first gentleman of New Hampshire
- John Hope (1894) – 4th president, Morehouse College; 5th president, Atlanta University; the first African-American in both roles; co-founder of the Niagara Movement, which became the NAACP
- George Rice Hovey – 2nd president, Virginia Union University
- Charles W. Hunt – 3rd president, State University of New York at Oneonta
- Suzanne Keen (A.B. 1984, A.M. 1986) – 10th president, Scripps College
- Jim Yong Kim (A.B. 1982) – 17th president, Dartmouth College; 12th president of the World Bank
- Larry Kramer (A.B. 1980) – president and vice chancellor, London School of Economics; Richard E. Lang Professor of Law and dean emeritus, Stanford Law School; president of the Hewlett Foundation
- Ari Kuncoro (Ph.D. 1994) – rector, University of Indonesia
- Joan Leitzel (M.A. 1961) – 17th president, University of New Hampshire
- Joan Lescinski (Ph.D. 1981) – 13th president, St. Ambrose University
- Jack N. Lightstone (Ph.D. 1977) – president and vice chancellor, Brock University
- Luther Luedtke (Ph.D. 1971) – 5th president, California Lutheran University
- James A. MacAlister (1856) – 1st president, Drexel University
- Horace Mann (A.B. 1819) – 1st president, Antioch College; "father" of American public education; member of the U.S. House of Representatives

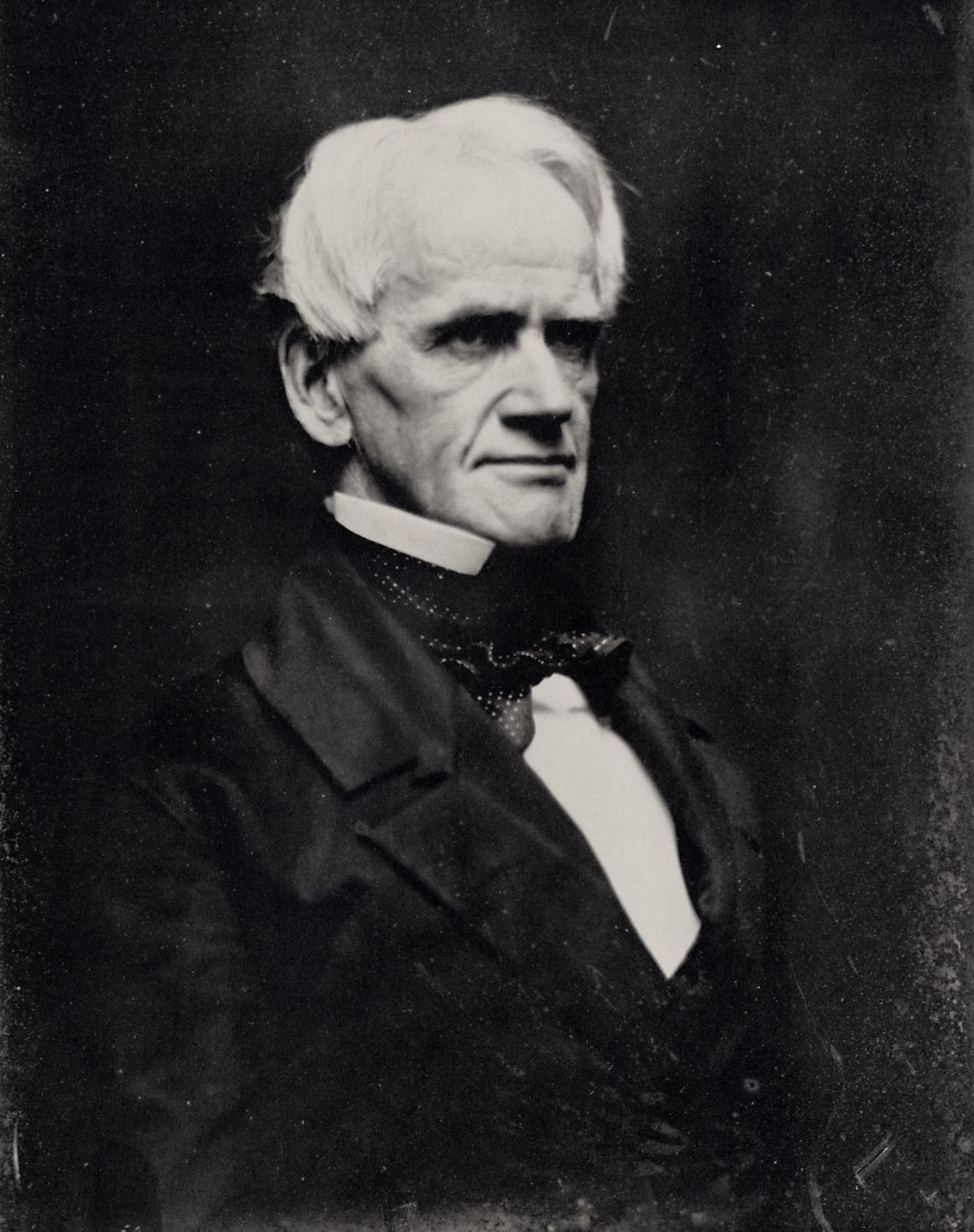
Horace Mann (1819)

- Jonathan Maxcy (A.B. 1787) – 2nd president, Brown University; 1st president, University of South Carolina; 3rd president, Union College
- David Maxwell (A.M. 1968) – 12th president, Drake University
- Alexander Meiklejohn (A.B. 1893, A.M. 1895) – 8th president, Amherst College; Dean, Brown University; philosopher and free-speech advocate
- Asa Messer (1790) – 3rd president, Brown University
- Alicia D. Monroe (A.B. 1973) – provost, Baylor College of Medicine
- Alonzo G. Morón (B.A. 1932) – 8th president of Hampton University, sociologist, civil servant
- Richard L. Morrill (A.B. 1961) – 8th president, University of Richmond; 18th president, Centre College; president, Salem College
- Robert W. Morse (A.M. 1947, Ph.D. 1949) – 1st president, Case Western Reserve University
- Samuel M. Nabrit (Ph.D. 1932) – 2nd president, Texas Southern University
- Stephen W. Nease (A.B. 1946) – president, Mount Vernon Nazarene College; president, Southern Nazarene University; president, Nazarene Theological Seminary; president, Eastern Nazarene College
- Louis E. Newman (Ph.D. 1983) – associate vice provost for Undergraduate Education, Stanford University
- Dorothy L. Njeuma (Sc.B. 1966) – rector, University of Yaoundé; Vice-Chancellor, University of Buea
- Melissa Nobles (A.B. 1985) – chancellor and professor of Political Science, MIT
- Eliphalet Nott (A.M. 1795) – 4th president, Union College; 3rd president, Rensselaer Polytechnic Institute; the longest serving American college president
- Inman E. Page (A.B. 1877, A.M. 1880) – president of the Lincoln Institute, Langston University, Western University, and Roger Williams University
- Lynn Pasquerella (Ph.D. 1985) – 18th president, Mount Holyoke College
- Bill Pepicello – 6th president, University of Phoenix
- William Carey Poland (A.B. 1868, A.M. 1868) – 5th president, Rhode Island School of Design
- Willard Preston (A.B. 1806) – 4th president, University of Vermont
- Wendell Pritchett (A.B. 1986) – chancellor of Rutgers University–Camden (2009–14); provost, University of Pennsylvania (2017–21); interim president, University of Pennsylvania (2022); first person of color to lead the University of Pennsylvania
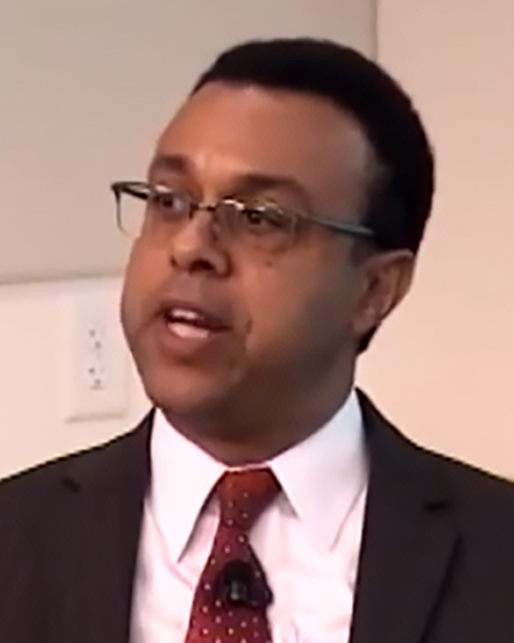
  Wendell Pritchett (1986)
- Suzanne M. Rivera (A.B. 1991) – 17th president, Macalester College
- Chase F. Robinson (A.B. 1985) – president and Distinguished Professor, The Graduate Center, CUNY
- Ezekiel Robinson (1838) – 7th president, Brown University
- Vincent Rougeau (A.B. 1985) – 33rd president, College of the Holy Cross
- Leonard Schlesinger (A.B. 1972) – 12th president, Babson College
- Barnas Sears (1825) – 5th president, Brown University
- Kenneth Starr (A.M. 1969) – 14th president, Baylor University
- Arthur R. Taylor (A.B. 1957, A.M 1961) – 10th president, Muhlenberg College; president, CBS (1972–1976)
- Brock Tessman (A.B. 1998) – 13th president, Montana State University; 17th president, Northern Michigan University
- Sir Richard Trainor (A.B. 1970) – principal, King's College London (2004–2014); rector, Exeter College, Oxford (2014–2024)

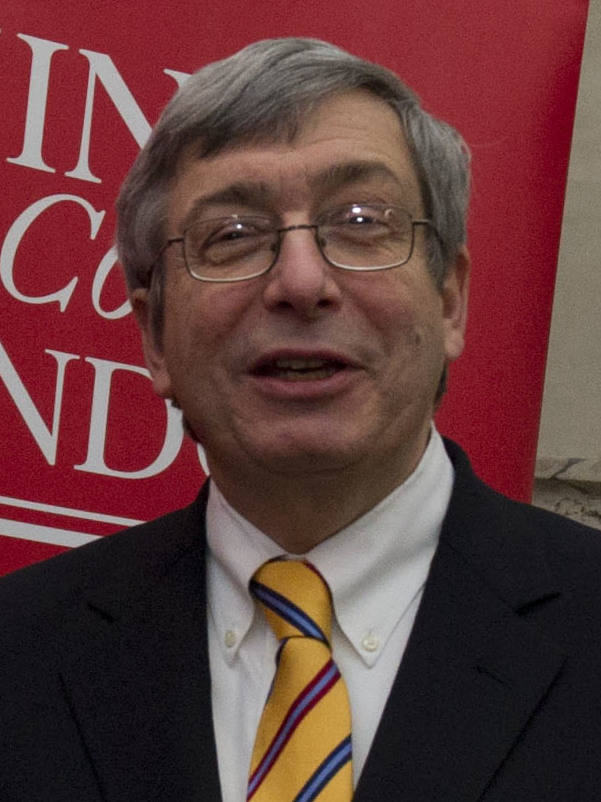
Sir Richard Trainor (1970)

- Jean Walton (Sc.M. 1940) – vice president of Student Affairs, Pomona College
- Charles Henry Watts II (1947) – 11th president, Bucknell University
- Yang Wei (Ph.D. 1985) – president, Zhejiang University
- Nils Yngve Wessell (A.M. 1935) – 8th president, Tufts University
- Benjamin Ide Wheeler (A.B. 1875, A.M. 1878) – 8th president, University of California
- Charles Lincoln White (A.B. 1887) – 13th president, Colby College
- Beniah Longley Whitman (A.B. 1887, A.M. 1890) – 11th president, Colby College; 7th President, George Washington University
- Mary Emma Woolley (A.B. 1894, A.M 1895) – 10th president, Mount Holyoke College

=== Applied sciences ===
- Lallit Anand (Sc.M. 1972, Ph.D. 1975) – Warren and Towneley Rohsenow Professor of Mechanical Engineering, MIT
- Panos Antsaklis (Sc.M., Ph.D. 1977) – H. Clifford and Evelyn A. Brosey Professor of Electrical Engineering, University of Notre Dame
- Ravi V. Bellamkonda (Ph.D. 1994) – dean, Pratt School of Engineering, Duke University (2016–2021); provost and executive vice president of Academic Affairs, Emory University (2021–)
- Sangeeta N. Bhatia (Sc.B. 1990) – John J. and Dorothy Wilson Professor of Health Sciences and Technology and of Electrical Engineering and Computer Science, MIT
- Kenneth Breuer (Sc.B. 1982) – professor of Engineering and Professor of Ecology, Evolution, and Organismal Biology, Brown University

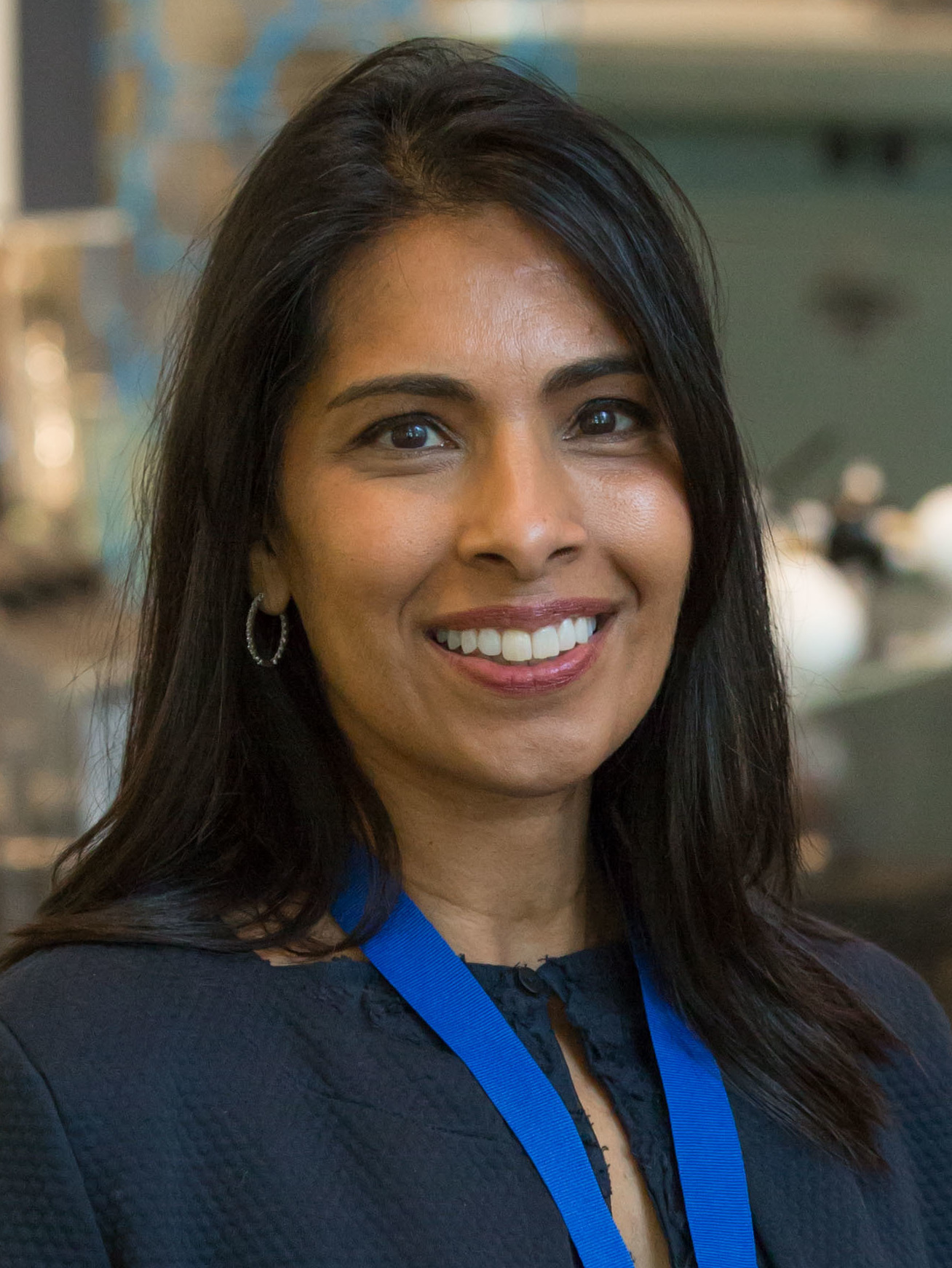
Sangeeta N. Bhatia (1990)

- Bernard Budiansky (Ph.D. 1950) – James Lawrence Professor of Engineering, Harvard University; recipient of the 1989 Timoshenko Medal
- Herman Chernoff (Ph.D. 1948) – professor emeritus of Applied Mathematics, MIT; known for the Chernoff bound, Chernoff distribution and Chernoff face
- Kathleen E. Cullen (Sc.B. 1984) – Raj and Neera Singh Professor of Biomedical Engineering, Johns Hopkins University
- William Curtin (Sc.B. 1981, Sc.M. 1981) – professor of Engineering, Brown University
- Tejal Desai (Sc.B. 1994) – Sorensen Family Dean of Engineering, Brown University School of Engineering
- Kathleen M. Eisenhardt (Sc.B. 1969) – Stanford W. Ascherman M.D. Professor, Department of Management Science and Engineering, Stanford University
- Philippe Fauchet (Sc.M. 1980) – Bruce and Bridgitt Evans Dean of Engineering, Vanderbilt University School of Engineering
- Rina Foygel Barber (Sc.B. 2005) – Louis Block Professor of Statistics, University of Chicago; recipient of the 2023 MacArthur Fellowship
- Thomas K. Gaisser (Ph.D. 1967) – Martin A. Pomerantz Professor of Physics, University of Delaware
- Christine Grant (Sc.B. 1984) – professor of Chemical Engineering and associate dean of Faculty Advancement, North Carolina State University
- Cindy Grimm (Ph.D. 1996) – Professor, Oregon State University College of Engineering
- Leigh Hochberg (Sc.B. 1990) – L. Herbert Ballou University Professor of Engineering, Brown University; Senior Lecturer in Neurology, Harvard Medical School
- Philip G. Hodge (Ph.D. 1949) – professor emeritus of Mechanics, University of Minnesota
- Ayanna Howard (Sc.B. 1993) – dean, College of Engineering, Ohio State University
- Rudolph C. Hwa (Ph.D. 1962) – professor of Physics, University of Oregon
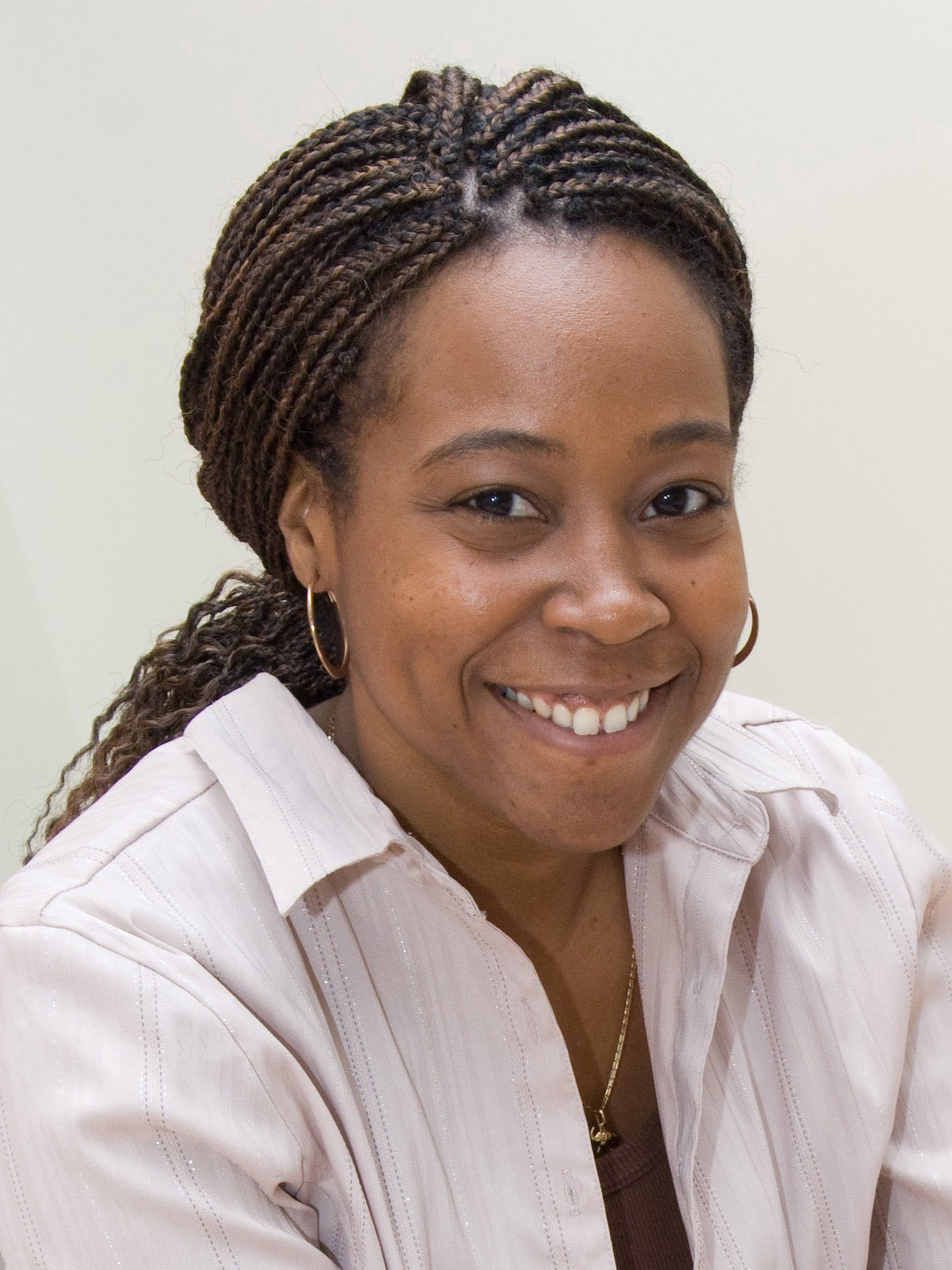
  Ayanna Howard (1993)
- Joseph Jacobson (Sc.B 1987) – associate professor of Media Arts and Sciences, MIT
- Richard D. James (Sc.B. 1974) – Distinguished McKnight University Professor of Aerospace Engineering Mechanics, University of Minnesota
- Amy Wagoner Johnson (Ph.D. 2002) – professor in the Department of Mechanical Science and Engineering, Grainger College of Engineering, University of Illinois Urbana-Champaign
- Mark Kachanov (Ph.D. 1981) – Professor of Mechanical Engineering, Tufts University
- John Kim (Sc.M. 1974) – Distinguished Professor Emeritus of Mechanical and Aerospace Engineering, UCLA
- Enrique J. Lavernia (Sc.B. 1982) – Distinguished Professor of Materials Science and Engineering, UC Irvine Samueli School of Engineering; provost and executive vice chancellor, UC Irvine; interim provost and executive vice chancellor, UC Davis
- Adrienne Lavine (Sc.B. 1979) – Professor of Mechanical and Aerospace Engineering, University of California, Los Angeles
- Ting-Kuo Lee (Sc.M. 1974, Ph.D. 1976) – research chair professor, National Sun Yat-sen University
- Philip Levis (Sc.B. 1999) – professor of Computer Science and Electrical Engineering, Stanford University
- Fengyan Li (Ph.D. 2004) – professor of Applied Mathematics, Rensselaer Polytechnic Institute
- Victor Li (Sc.B. 1977, Sc.M. 1978, Ph.D. 1981) – James R. Rice Distinguished University Professor of Engineering and the E.B. Wylie Collegiate Professor of Civil Engineering, University of Michigan; inventor of engineered cementitious composites
- Reda R. Mankbadi (Ph.D. 1979) – Distinguished Professor and Founding Dean, College of Engineering, Embry–Riddle Aeronautical University
- Robert McMeeking (MSc 1974, Ph.D. 1977) – Tony Evans Distinguished Professor of Structural Materials and Mechanical Engineering, UC Santa Barbara; recipient of the 2014 Timoshenko Medal
- Efstathios E. Michaelides (Sc.M. 1979) – W.A. "Tex" Moncrief, Jr. Founding Chair of Engineering, Texas Christian University; Leo S. Weil Professor of Mechanical Engineering, Tulane University; founder and chair of the Department of Mechanical and Energy Engineering, University of North Texas
- Yves Moreau (MSc 1994) – professor of Engineering, KU Leuven
- Salvatore D. Morgera (Sc.B. 1968, Sc.M. 1970, Ph.D. 1975) – professor of Electrical Engineering and Biomedical Engineering, University of South Florida
- Simon Ostrach (Sc.M. 1945, Ph.D. 1950) – Wilbert J. Austin Distinguished Professor Emeritus of Engineering, Case Western Reserve University; pioneer in space science
- Andrew Clennel Palmer (Ph.D. 1965) – professor of Civil Engineering, National University of Singapore
- Stella Pang (BSc 1977) – department head and chair professor of Electronic Engineering, City University of Hong Kong
- Jon Peha (Sc.B. 1985) – professor of Electrical Engineering, Carnegie Mellon University
- Louise Prockter (MSc Ph.D. 1999) – chief scientist, Space Exploration Sector, Johns Hopkins Applied Physics Laboratory, Johns Hopkins University
- Lisa Pruitt (Sc.M. 1990, Ph.D. 1993) – Distinguished Professor of Mechanical Engineering and Lawrence Talbot Chair in Engineering, University of California, Berkeley
- Upadrasta Ramamurty (Ph.D. 1994) – President's Chair in Mechanical and Aerospace Engineering and Materials Science and Engineering, Nanyang Technological University
- Kavita Ramanan (Sc.M. 1993, Ph.D. 1998) – Roland George Dwight Richardson University Professor of Applied Mathematics, Brown University
- Kaliat Ramesh (Sc.M. 1985, Sc.M. 1987, Ph.D. 1988) – Alonzo G. Decker Jr. Professor of Science and Engineering, Johns Hopkins University Whiting School of Engineering
- Guruswami Ravichandran (Ph.D. 1987) – John E. Goode Jr., professor of Aerospace and Mechanical Engineering; Otis Booth Leadership Chair, Division of Engineering and Applied Science at the California Institute of Technology
- Ares J. Rosakis (Sc.M. 1980, Ph.D. 1982) – Theodore von Kármán Professor of Aeronautics and Professor of Mechanical Engineering, California Institute of Technology
- John Rudnicki (Sc.B. 1973, Sc.M. 1974, Ph.D. 1977) – professor of Civil and Environmental Engineering and Mechanical Engineering, Northwestern University
- Ed Scheinerman (Sc.B. 1980) – professor of Applied Mathematics, Statistics, and Computer Science, Johns Hopkins University
- Paul H. Steen (Sc.B. A.B., 1975) – Maxwell M. Upson Professor, Smith School of Chemical and Biomolecular Engineering, Cornell University
- Katia Sycara (Sc.B. 1969) – Edward Fredkin Research Professor of Robotics, Carnegie Mellon University
- Robert Henry Thurston (1859) – professor of Mechanical Engineering, Stevens Institute of Technology
- Gretar Tryggvason (Sc.M. 1982, Ph.D. 1985) – department head and Charles A. Miller Jr. Distinguished Professor of Mechanical Engineering, Johns Hopkins University
- Krystyn Van Vliet (Sc.B. 1998) – Michael and Sonja Koerner Professor of Materials Science and Engineering, MIT
- Richard W. Ziolkowski (Sc.B. 1974) – Litton Industries John M. Leonis Distinguished Professor, Department of Electrical and Computer Engineering, University of Arizona

=== Economics and management ===
- Mark Aguiar (A.B. 1988) – Walker Professor of Economics and International Finance, Princeton University
- Igor Ansoff (Ph.D. 1948) – economist and applied mathematician; Founding Dean, Owen Graduate School of Management at Vanderbilt University
- Clarence Edwin Ayres (A.B. 1912, M.A. 1914) – Professor of Economics, University of Texas at Austin; leading proponent of institutional economics
- Malcolm Baker (A.B. 1992) – Robert G. Kirby Professor of Business Administration, Harvard Business School
- William A. Darity Jr. (A.B. 1974) – Samuel DuBois Cook Distinguished Professor of Public Policy, Sanford School of Public Policy at Duke University
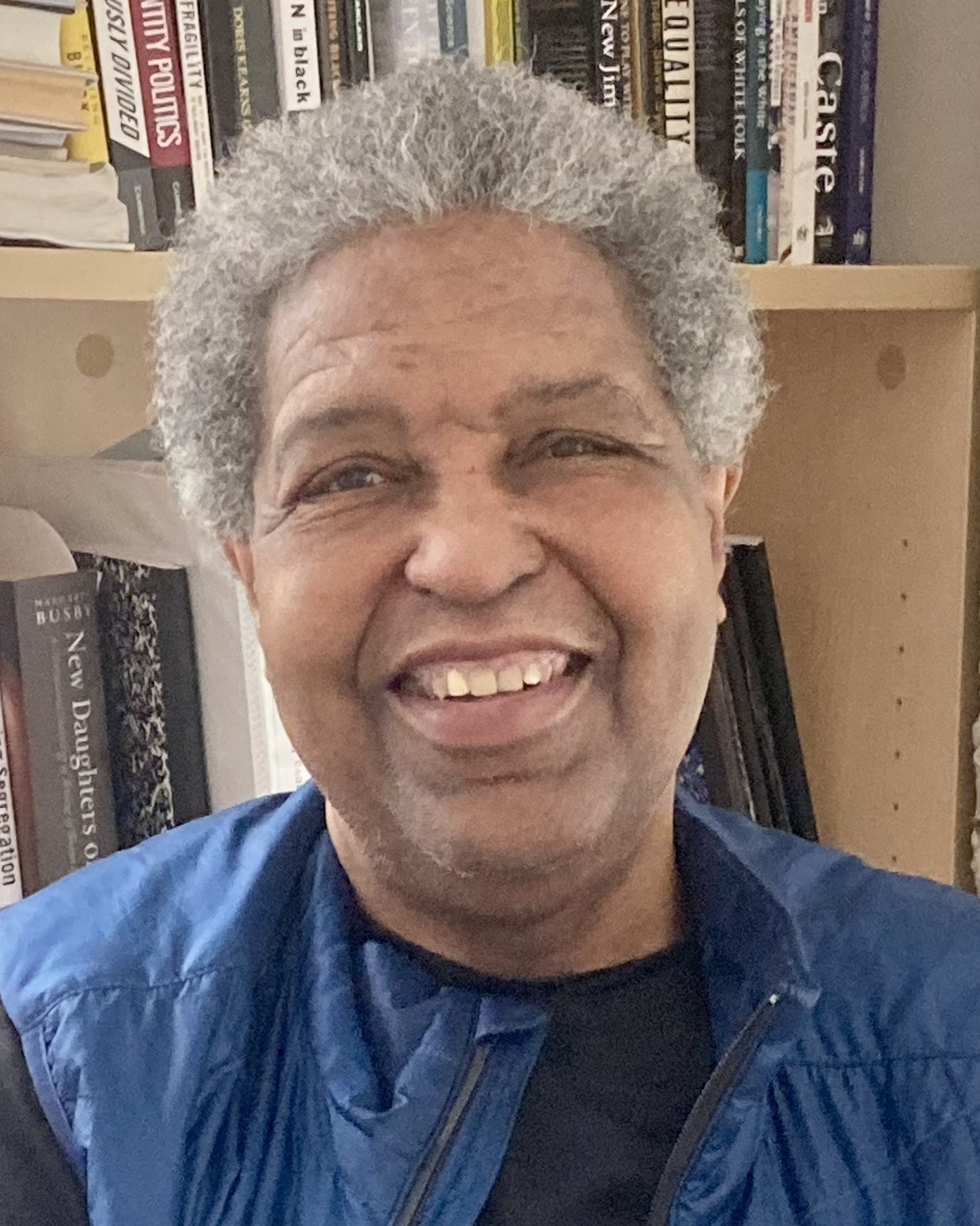
  William Darity (1974)
- Steven J. Davis (A.M. 1981, Ph.D. 1986) – William H. Abbott Distinguished Service Professor of International Business and Economics, University of Chicago Booth School of Business; senior fellow, Hoover Institution
- Mihir A. Desai (A.B. 1989) – Mizuho Financial Group Professor of Finance, Harvard Business School; professor of Law, Harvard Law School
- Douglas Diamond (A.B. 1975) – Merton H. Miller Distinguished Service Professor of Finance, University of Chicago Booth School of Business; Nobel laureate (Economic Sciences, 2022)
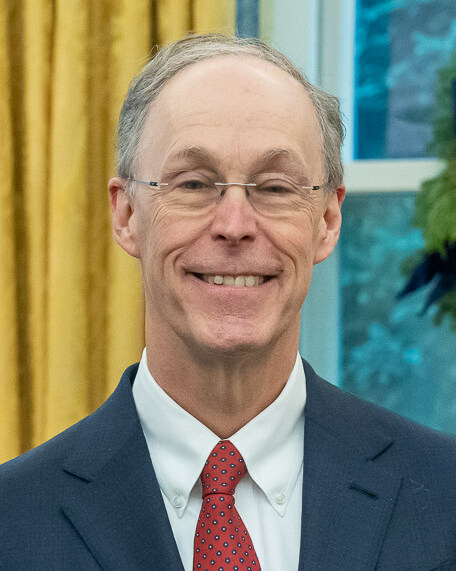
  Douglas Diamond (1975)
- Karen Dynan (A.B. 1985) – Professor of the Practice, Economics Department, Harvard Kennedy School
- James Feyrer (A.M., Ph.D. 2001) – Professor and Vice-Chair of Economics, Dartmouth College
- Marvin Goodfriend (Ph.D. 1980) – Friends of Allan Meltzer Professor of Economics, Carnegie Mellon University
- Dale L. Goodhue (A.B. 1969) – professor, Department of Management and Information Systems, Terry College of Business, University of Georgia
- John Haltiwanger (Sc.B. 1977) – Dudley and Louisa Dillard Professor of Economics and Distinguished University Professor of Economics, University of Maryland, College Park
- Janice Hammond (Sc.B.) – Jesse Philips Professor of Manufacturing, Harvard Business School
- Jerry A. Hausman (A.B. 1968) – John and Jennie S. MacDonald Professor of Economics, MIT
- Judith K. Hellerstein (Sc.B. 1987) – Professor of Economics, University of Maryland, College Park
- Guido Imbens (A.M. 1989, Ph.D. 1991) – Applied Econometrics Professor and Professor of Economics, Stanford Graduate School of Business; Nobel laureate (Economic Sciences, 2021)
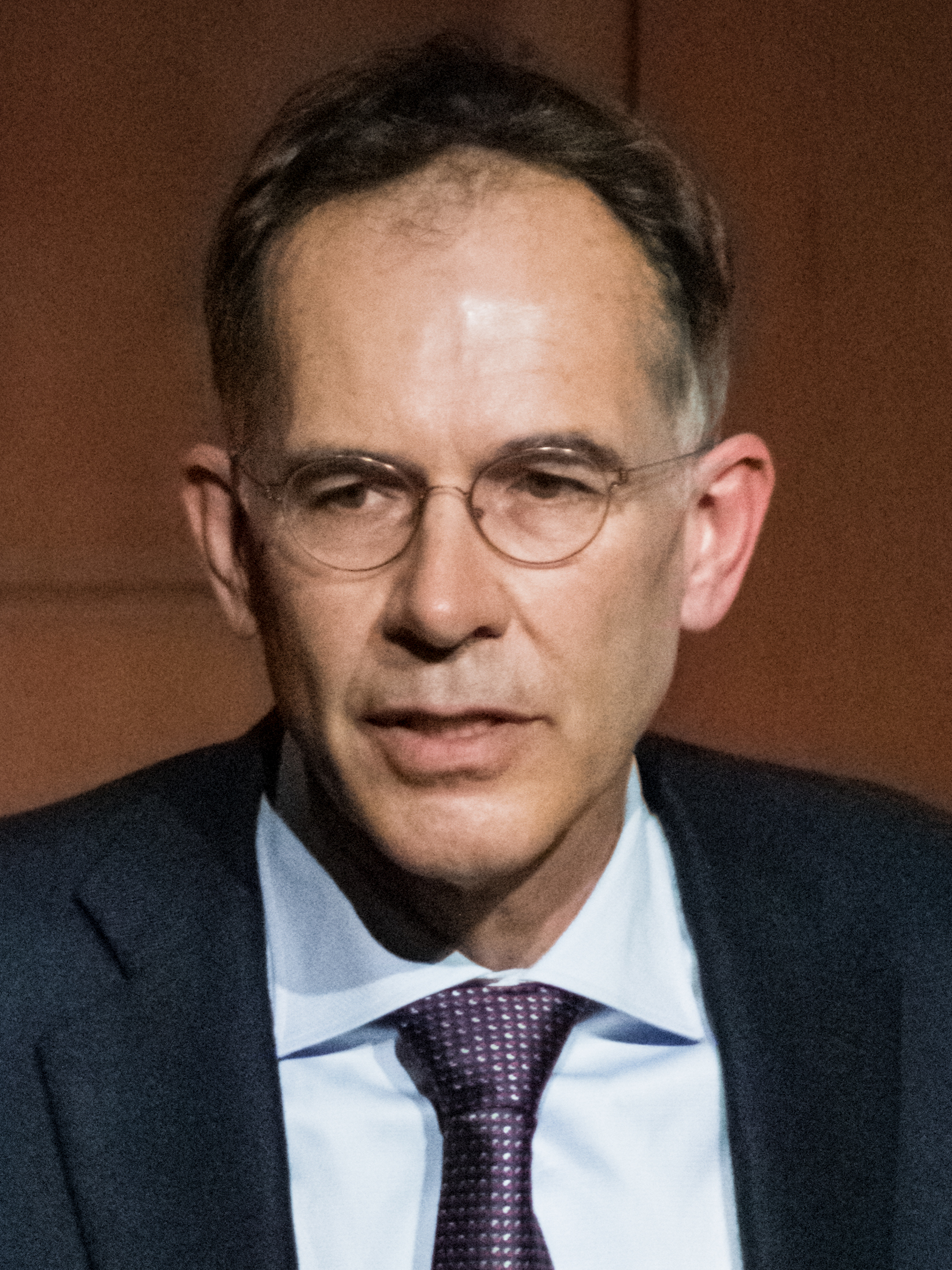
  Guido Imbens (1989, 1991)
- Sebnem Kalemli-Ozcan (A.M. 1997, Ph.D. 2000) – Neil Moskowitz Endowed Professor of Economics, University of Maryland, College Park
- Bruce J. Katz (A.B. 1981) – vice president, Brookings Institution; Visiting Professor, London School of Economics
- Michael Keane (Ph.D. 1989) – Wm. Polk Carey Distinguished Professor, Johns Hopkins University
- Robert G. King (A.B., A.M., Ph.D.) – professor of Economics, Boston University
- Randall Kroszner (Sc.B. 1984) – Norman R. Bobins Professor of Economics, University of Chicago Booth School of Business
- Neale Mahoney (Sc.B. 2005) – professor of Economics, Stanford University
- Edwin Mills (A.B. 1951) – professor emeritus of Real Estate and Finance, Kellogg School of Management at Northwestern University
- Robert A. Moffitt (A.M. 1972, Ph.D. 1975) – Krieger-Eisenhower Professor of Economics, Johns Hopkins University
- Jonathan Morduch (A.B. 1985) – professor of Public Policy and Economics, Robert F. Wagner Graduate School of Public Service at NYU
- Michael William Morris (A.B. 1986) – Chavkin-Chang Professor of Leadership, Columbia Business School
- Anna Nagurney (A.B. 1977, Sc.B. 1977, Sc.M. 1980, Ph.D. 1983) – John F. Smith Memorial Professor, Isenberg School of Management at University of Massachusetts Amherst
- George Pennacchi (Sc.B. 1977) – Bailey Memorial Chair of Finance, Gies College of Business, University of Illinois Urbana-Champaign
- Georgia Perakis (Sc.M. 1988, Ph.D. 1993) – William F. Pounds Professor of Management, MIT Sloan School of Management
- Carl C. Plehn (1889) – professor of Public Finance, UC Berkeley
- Eswar Prasad (A.M. 1986) – Tolani Senior Professor of Trade Policy, Cornell University; senior fellow, Brookings Institution

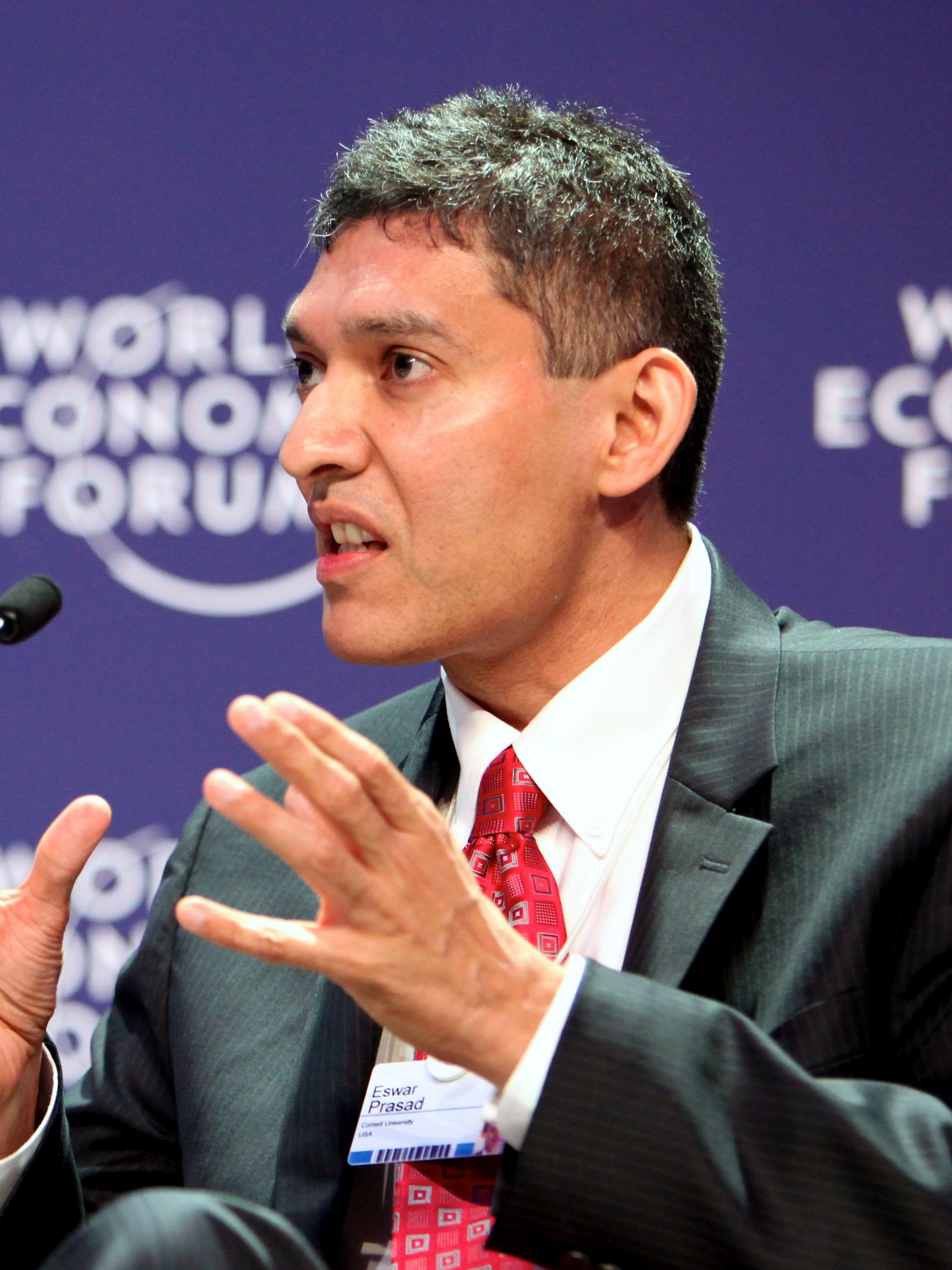
Eswar Prasad (1986)

- Karthick Ramakrishnan (A.B. 1996) – professor of Public Policy, UC Riverside
- Nancy Rothbard (A.B. 1990) – deputy dean and David Pottruck Professor of Management, Wharton School of the University of Pennsylvania
- David Schmittlein (A.B. 1977) – John C Head III Dean (2007-2024) and Professor of Marketing, MIT Sloan School of Management
- Scott Shane (A.B. 1986) – A. Malachi Mixon III Professor of Entrepreneurial Studies and Professor of Economics, Case Western Reserve University
- Anthony Shorrocks (A.M. 1970) – professor, London School of Economics; 5th Director of World Institute for Development Economics Research
- Julia Steinberger (Sc.B. 1996) – professor of Ecological Economics, University of Lausanne
- Ebonya Washington (A.B. 1995) – Samuel C. Park Jr. Professor of Economics, Yale University
- David N. Weil (A.B. 1982) – James and Merryl Tisch Professor of Economics, Brown University
- John Henry Williams (A.B. 1912) – Founding Dean, Harvard Kennedy School; economist of international trade theory
- Janet Yellen (A.B. 1967) – Eugene E. and Catherine M. Trefethen Professor Emeritus of Business Administration, Haas School of Business at UC Berkeley; 78th U.S. secretary of the treasury; 15th chair of the Federal Reserve; the first woman in both roles

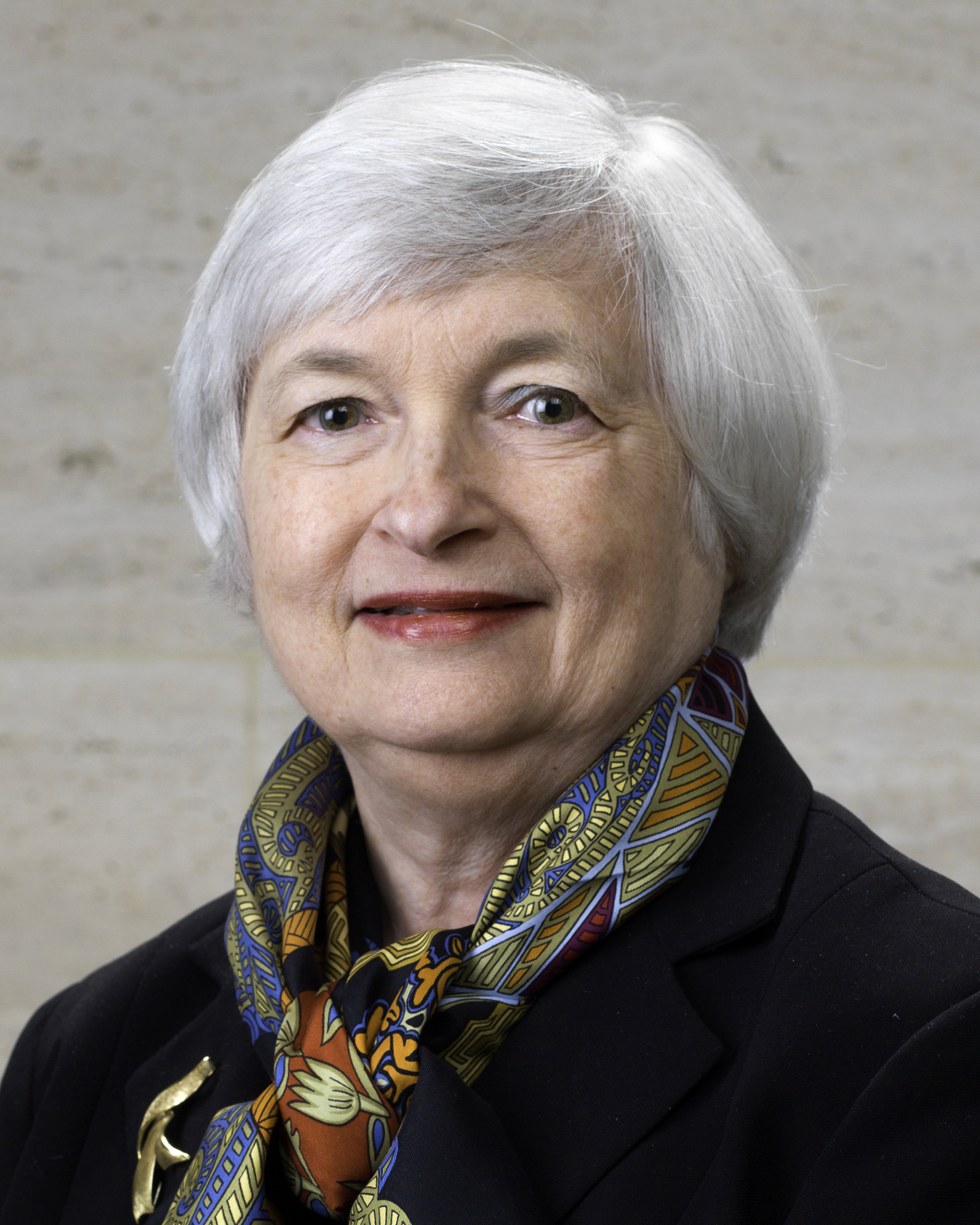
Janet Yellen (1967)

=== Formal sciences ===
- Clarence Raymond Adams (1918) – professor and chair of the Department of Mathematics, Brown University
- Frederick J. Almgren Jr. (Ph.D. 1962) – professor of Mathematics, Princeton University; recipient of a Guggenheim Fellowship
- Douglas N. Arnold (A.B. 1975) – McKnight Presidential Professor of Mathematics, University of Minnesota
- Grace Bates (A.M. 1938) – professor emerita of Mathematics, Mount Holyoke College
- Dorothy Lewis Bernstein (Ph.D. 1939) – president, Mathematical Association of America; the first woman elected to position
- David Blei (Sc.B. 1997) – professor of Computer Science and Statistics, Columbia University
- Dick Bulterman (Sc.M. 1977, Ph.D. 1982) – professor and chair of the Department of Computer Science, Vrije Universiteit Amsterdam
- Mike Cafarella (A.B. 1996) – principal research scientist, MIT Computer Science and Artificial Intelligence Laboratory
- Yingda Cheng (A.M. 2004) – professor of Mathematics, Virginia Tech
- Ruth F. Curtain (Ph.D. 1969) – professor of Mathematics, University of Groningen
- Mahlon Marsh Day (1939) – professor of Mathematics, University of Illinois Urbana-Champaign
- Vanja Dukic (Ph.D. 2001) – professor of Mathematics, University of Colorado Boulder
- Nelson Dunford (Ph.D. 1936) – James E. English Professor of Mathematics emeritus, Yale University; namesake of the Dunford decomposition, Dunford–Pettis property, and Dunford-Schwartz theorem
- Joanne Elliott (1947) – professor of Mathematics, Rutgers University
- Steven K. Feiner (A.B. 1973, Ph.D. 1985) – professor of Computer Science, Columbia University
- George Forsythe (Ph.D. 1941) – founder and chair of the Computer Science Department, Stanford University; creator of the term "computer science"
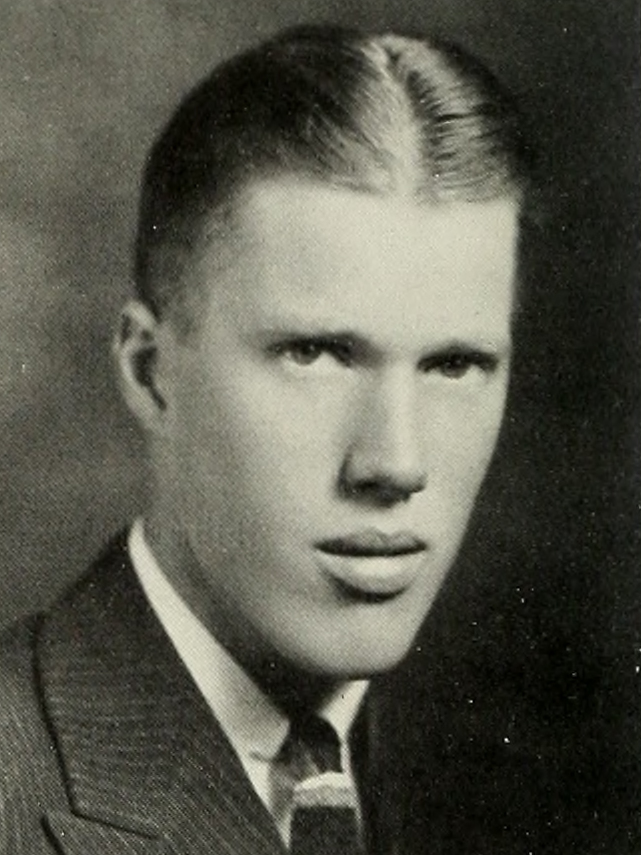
  George Forsythe (Ph.D. 1941)
- William Fulton (A.B. 1961) – Oscar Zariski Distinguished University Professor Emeritus, University of Michigan
- John D. Gannon (A.B., A.M.) – professor and chair of the Department of Computer Science, University of Maryland, College Park
- Paul Garabedian (A.B. 1946) – director, Division of Computational Fluid Dynamics, Courant Institute School of Mathematics, Computing, and Data Science, New York University
- Thomas A. Garrity (Ph.D. 1986) – Webster Atwell Class of 1921 Professor of Mathematics, Williams College
- Anne Gelb (Sc.M. 1991, Ph.D. 1996) – John G. Kemeny Parents Professor of Mathematics, Dartmouth College
- Sharon Goldwater (Sc.B. 1998, Sc.M. 2005, Ph.D. 2007) – personal chair of Computational Language Learning, School of Informatics, University of Edinburgh
- Mark Goresky (Ph.D. 1976) – member, Institute for Advanced Study; co-inventor of intersection homology
- Samuel Stillman Greene (1837) – professor of Mathematics and Astronomy, Brown University; superintendent of schools in Providence, Rhode Island and Springfield, Massachusetts
- John Guttag (A.B. 1971) – chair of the Electrical Engineering and Computer Science Department (1999–2004), MIT
- Robert Miller Hardt (Ph.D. 1971) – W.L. Moody Professor of Mathematics, Rice University
- James Hendler (MSc 1983, Ph.D. 1986) – Tetherless World Professor of Computer, Web and Cognitive Sciences, Rensselaer Polytechnic Institute; one of the originators of the Semantic Web
- John George Herriot (Ph.D. 1941) – professor of Computer Science, Stanford University
- Meyer Jerison (A.M. 1947) – chair of the Division of Mathematical Sciences, Purdue University (1969–1975)
- Scott Klemmer (A.B. 1999) – professor of Cognitive Science and Computer Science & Engineering, UC San Diego
- David Laidlaw (Sc.B. 1983, Sc.M. 1985) – professor of Computer Science, Brown University
- Joseph J. LaViola Jr. (Ph.D. 2005) – Charles N. Millican Professor in Computer Science, University of Central Florida
- Robert Lazarsfeld (Ph.D. 1980) – Distinguished Professor of Mathematics and Chair of the Mathematics Department, Stony Brook University
- Edward D. Lazowska (A.B. 1972) – Bill & Melinda Gates Chair Emeritus, Paul G. Allen School of Computer Science & Engineering at University of Washington
- Derrick Henry Lehmer (Ph.D. 1930) – professor emeritus of Mathematics, UC, Berkeley; "father of computational number theory"
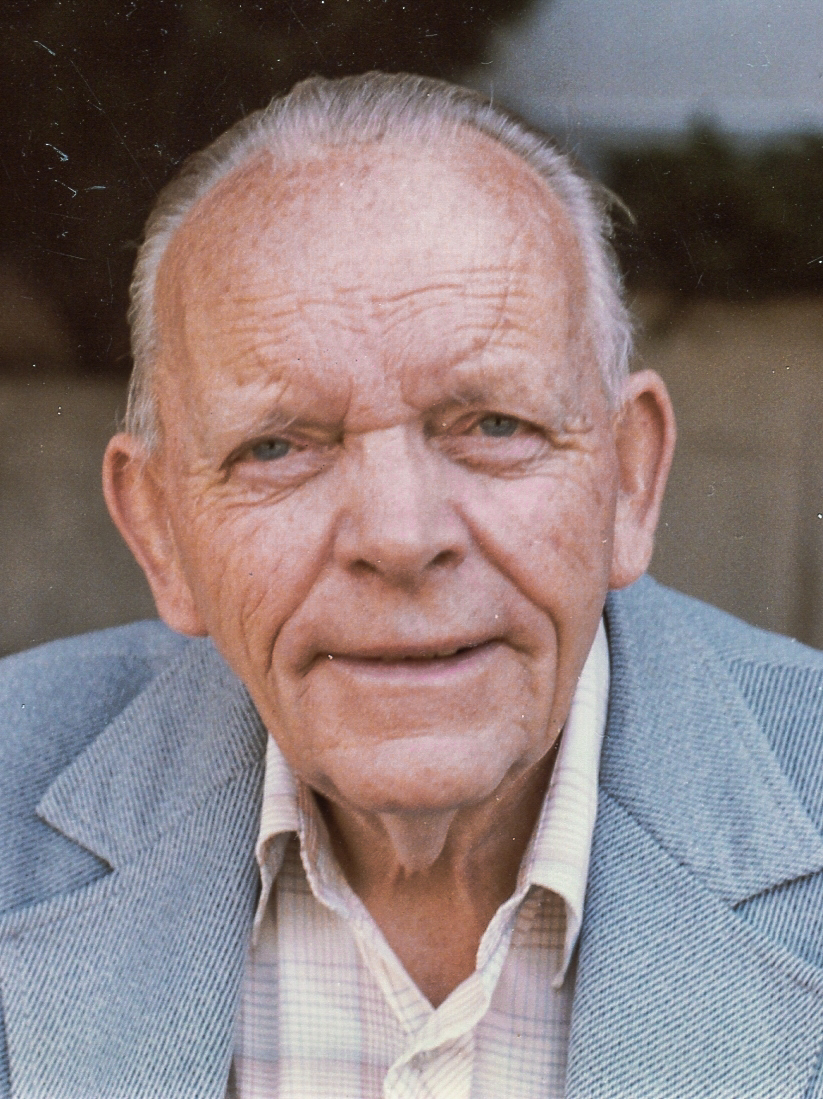
  Derrick Henry Lehmer (1930)
- Katrina Ligett (Sc.B. 2004) – associate professor of Computer Science, Hebrew University of Jerusalem
- Michael L. Littman (Ph.D. 1996) – University Professor of Computer Science, Brown University
- Michelle Manes (Sc.M. 2004, Ph.D. 2007) – professor of Mathematics, University of Hawaiʻi at Mānoa
- Dan Margalit (Sc.B. 1998) – Stevenson Professor and Department Chair in the Department of Mathematics, Vanderbilt University
- Kathleen McKeown (A.B. 1976) – Henry and Gertrude Rothschild Professor of Computer Science and Founding Director, Data Science Institute at Columbia University
- Sarah Meiklejohn (Sc.B 2008, Sc.M. 2009) – professor of Cryptography and Security, University College London
- Todd Millstein (A.B. 1996) – professor and chair of the Department of Computer Science, University of California, Los Angeles
- Melanie Mitchell (A.B. 1980) – Davis Professor of Complexity, Santa Fe Institute; co-developer of Copycat
- Clemency Montelle (Ph.D. 2005) – professor of Mathematics, University of Canterbury
- Edward F. Moore (Ph.D. 1950) – professor of Mathematics and Computer Science, University of Wisconsin–Madison; known for the Moore machine
- John Coleman Moore (Ph.D. 1952) – professor emeritus of Mathematics, Princeton University; known for the Borel−Moore homology and Eilenberg–Moore spectral sequence
- Anthony Morse (Ph.D. 1937) – professor of Mathematics, UC Berkeley; known for the Morse–Kelley set theory, Morse–Sard theorem and the Federer–Morse theorem
- John Mylopoulos (Sc.B. 1966) – professor emeritus of Computer Science, University of Toronto
- M. G. Nadkarni (Ph.D. 1964) – professor and head of the Department of Mathematics, University of Mumbai
- David Nadler (BSc 1996) – professor of Mathematics, UC Berkeley
- David Notkin (Sc.B. 1977) – professor of Computer Science & Engineering, University of Washington
- Tony O'Farrell (Ph.D. 1973) – professor of Mathematics, Maynooth University
- Peter J. Olver (Sc.B. 1973) – professor of Mathematics, University of Minnesota
- William Vann Parker (Ph.D. 1931) – head of the Mathematics Department, Auburn University
- Randy Pausch (Sc.B. 1982) – professor of Computer Science, Carnegie Mellon University
- Carl Pomerance (A.B. 1966) – professor emeritus of Mathematics, Dartmouth College
- Rachel Justine Pries (Sc.B. 1994) – professor in the Department of Mathematics, Colorado State University
- Murray H. Protter (Ph.D. 1946) – professor and chair in the Department of Mathematics, UC Berkeley
- Ken Ribet (A.B., A.M. 1969) – professor of Mathematics, UC Berkeley; known for the Herbrand–Ribet theorem and Ribet's theorem
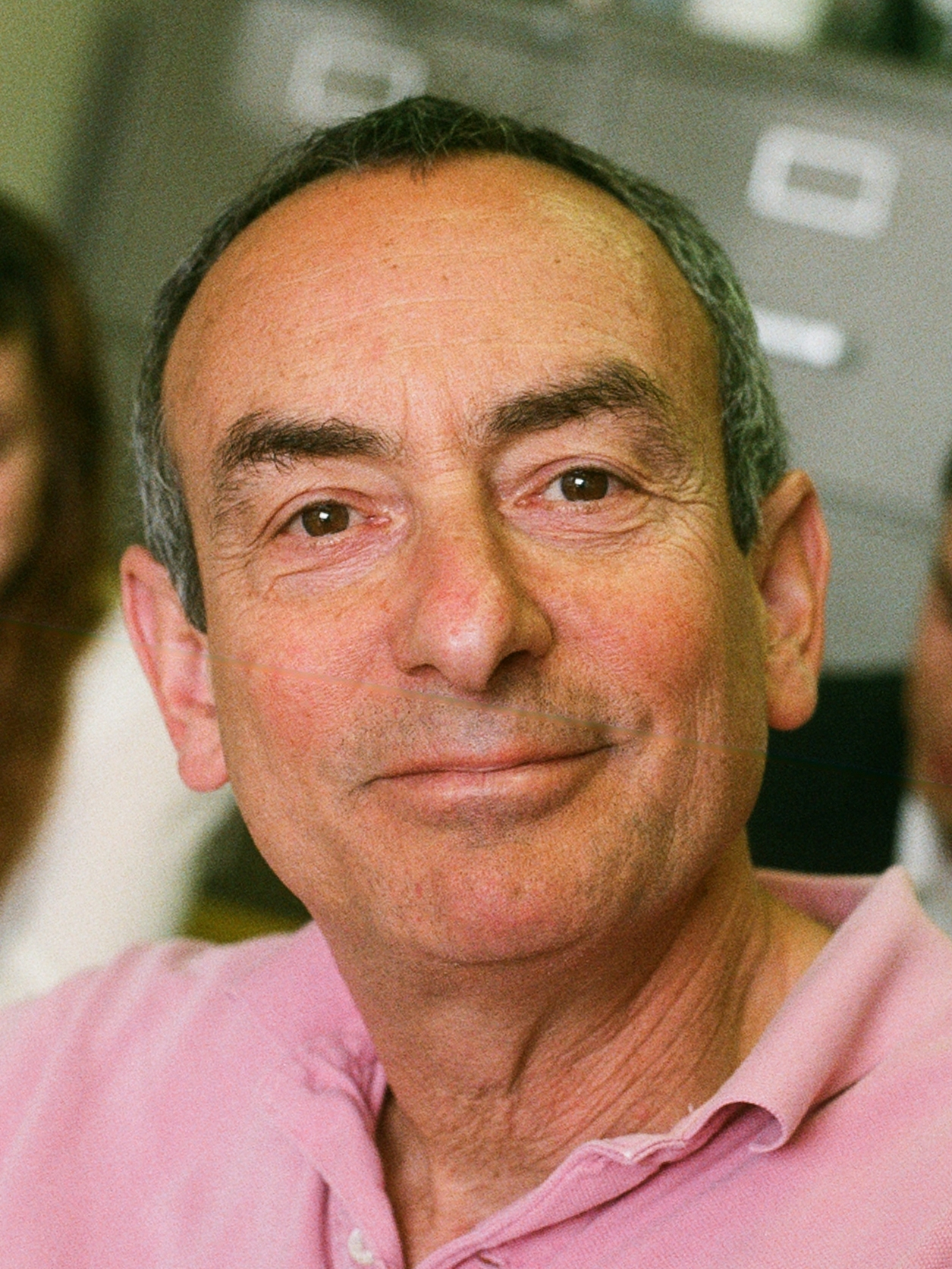
  Ken Ribet (1969)
- Edwina Rissland (Sc.B. 1969) – professor of Computer Science, University of Massachusetts Amherst
- Jason Rosenhouse (Sc.B. 1995) – professor of Mathematics, James Madison University
- Stefan Roth (Sc.M. 2003, Ph.D. 2007) – professor of Computer Science, Chair of the Department of Computer Science, Technische Universität Darmstadt
- William Ruggles (1820) – professor of Mathematics and Natural Philosophy, George Washington University
- Ernst Ruh (Ph.D. 1964) – professor of Mathematics, University of Fribourg
- Barbara G. Ryder (A.B. 1969) – head of the Department of Computer Science, Virginia Tech
- John Sarli (A.B. 1974) – professor of Mathematics, California State University, San Bernardino
- Robert Schapire (Sc.B. 1986) – David M. Siegel '83 Professor in Computer Science, Princeton University
- Robert Sedgewick (Sc.B. 1968, Sc.M. 1970) – department chair and William O. Baker Professor in Computer Science, Princeton University
- Chehrzad Shakiban (Ph.D. 1979) – professor of Mathematics, University of St. Thomas
- Hagit Shatkay (Ph.D. 1999) – professor of Computer and Information Science, University of Delaware
- Scott Shenker (Sc.B. 1978) – professor emeritus of Computer Science and chief scientist, UC Berkeley
- Alan Sherman (1978) – professor of Computer Science, University of Maryland, Baltimore County
- Shu Shien-Siu (Ph.D. 1948) – chair emeritus, Purdue University School of Aeronautics and Astronautics
- Joseph H. Silverman (Sc.B. 1977) – professor of Mathematics, Brown University
- Scott A. Smolka (Ph.D. 1984) – Distinguished Professor of Computer Science, Stony Brook University
- Halil Mete Soner (Sc.M. 1983, Ph.D. 1986) – Norman John Sollenberger Professor of Operations Research and Financial Engineering, Princeton University
- George Springer (Sc.M. 1946) – professor of Computer Science, Indiana University Bloomington
- Katherine E. Stange (Ph.D. 2008) – professor of Mathematics, University of Colorado Boulder
- John A. Stankovic (BSc 1970, MSc 1975, Ph.D. 1979) – BP America Professor of Computer Science, University of Virginia
- John Stasko (Sc.M. 1985, Ph.D. 1989) – Regents Professor, School of Interactive Computing, Georgia Tech
- Doris Stockton (Ph.D. 1958) – professor of Mathematics, University of Massachusetts Amherst
- Frank Tompa (Sc.B., Sc.M. 1970) – Distinguished Professor Emeritus of Computer Science, University of Waterloo
- Konstantina Trivisa (Ph.D. 1996) – professor of Mathematics, University of Maryland, College Park
- Douglas Ulmer (Ph.D. 1987) – professor and Head of the Department of Mathematics, University of Arizona
- Kari Vilonen (Ph.D. 1983) – professor in Pure Mathematics, University of Melbourne
- Ismar Volić (Ph.D. 2003) – professor of Mathematics, Wellesley College
- Martin M. Wattenberg (A.B. 1991) – Gordon McKay Professor of Computer Science, Harvard University
- Albert Wilansky (Ph.D. 1947) – Distinguished Professor of Mathematics, Lehigh University
- Raymond Louis Wilder (Ph.B. 1918, Sc.M. 1921) – professor of Mathematics, University of Michigan
- Elizabeth Yakel (A.B. 1980) – C. Olivia Frost Collegiate Professor of Information, University of Michigan
- Thaleia Zariphopoulou (Sc.M. 1989, Ph.D. 1989) – V.F. Neuhaus Centennial Professor and Presidential Chair in Mathematics, University of Texas at Austin

=== Humanities ===
- Asger Aaboe (Ph.D. 1957) – professor emeritus of the History of Science, Mathematics and of Near Eastern Languages and Literatures, Yale University
- Rocío Quispe Agnoli (A.M. 1993, Ph.D. 2000) – professor of Latin American Literatures and Cultures, Michigan State University
- Linda Martín Alcoff (Ph.D. 1987) – professor of Philosophy, Hunter College
- Mark Amerika (M.F.A. 1997) – professor of Art and Art History, University of Colorado Boulder
- Margaret L. Anderson (Ph.D. 1971) – professor emerita of History, UC Berkeley
- Jaime Homero Arjona (A.M. 1929, Ph.D. 1932) – professor of Romance and Classical Languages, University of Connecticut
- Brian Attebery (Ph.D. 1979) – professor emeritus of English, Idaho State University
- Leora Auslander (Ph.D. 1988) – Arthur and Joann Rasmussen Professor in Departments of Race, Diaspora, and Indigeneity and History, University of Chicago
- Jacques Bailly (A.B. 1988) – classicist at the University of Vermont; National Spelling Bee Official Pronouncer
- Irving H. Bartlett (Ph.D. 1952) – John F. Kennedy Professor of American Civilization, University of Massachusetts Boston
- Annette Kar Baxter (Ph.D. 1958) – Adolph and Effie Ochs Endowed Chair, Barnard College
- Charles E. Bennett (1878) – Goldwin Smith Professor of Latin, Cornell University
- Janetta Rebold Benton (Ph.D. 1980) – Distinguished Professor of Art History, Pace University
- Olivier Berggruen (A.B. 1986) – art historian
- George Boas (A.B., A.M. 1913) – professor of Philosophy, Johns Hopkins University
- Edgar S. Brightman (A.B. 1907, A.M. 1908) – philosopher, Martin Luther King Jr.'s advisor at Boston University
- Berenice A. Carroll (Ph.D. 1960) – director of women's study program, Purdue University; founder of the women's study program at University of Illinois Urbana-Champaign
- Richard Cartwright (Ph.D. 1954) – professor of Philosophy, Massachusetts Institute of Technology
- Susan Cayleff (A.M. 1979, Ph.D. 1983) – professor of Women's Studies, San Diego State University
- Marcia Chatelain (A.M. 2003, Ph.D. 2008) – Presidential Penn Compact Professor of Africana Studies, University of Pennsylvania, recipient of the Pulitzer Prize for History for Franchise: The Golden Arches in Black America

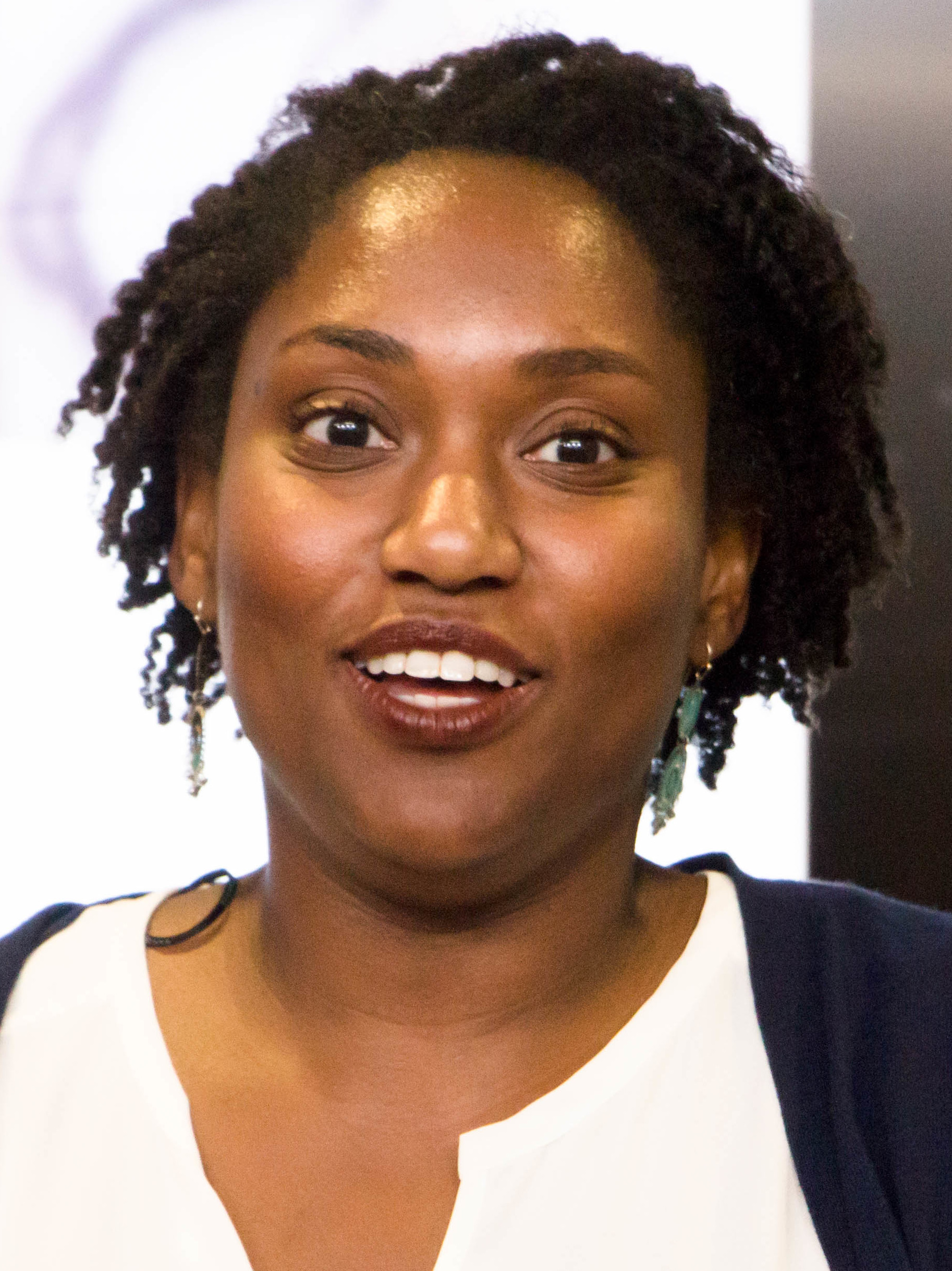
Marcia Chatelain (2008)

- Arianne Chernock (A.B. 1997) – professor of History, Boston University
- Roderick Chisholm (A.B. 1938) – professor of Philosophy, Brown University
- Carol Cleland (Ph.D. 1981) – professor of Philosophy, University of Colorado Boulder
- James Corum (A.M.) – military historian; lecturer, University of Salford
- Christina Crosby (Ph.D. 1982) – professor of English, Wesleyan University; scholar of feminism and critical disability studies
- Kenneth Dean (A.B. 1979) – Raffles Professor of Humanities, National University of Singapore
- Matt Delmont (A.M. 2004, Ph.D. 2008) – Sherman Fairchild Distinguished Professor of History, Dartmouth College
- Jane Desmond (A.B. 1973) – professor of Anthropology and Gender and Women's Studies, University of Illinois Urbana-Champaign
- Melvin Dixon (Ph.D. 1975) – professor of Literature, Queens College
- Bruce Donovan (A.B. 1959) – professor of Classics, Brown University
- Ann duCille (A.M. 1973, A.M. 1988, Ph.D. 1991) – professor of English, Wesleyan University
- Anne Dufourmantelle – philosopher and psychoanalyst
- Eric R. Dursteler (A.M. 1994, Ph.D. 2000) – De Lamar Jensen Professor of Early Modern History, Brigham Young University
- Jose Luis Ramos Escobar (A.M., Ph.D.) – professor in the Drama Department and dean of Humanities, University of Puerto Rico, Río Piedras Campus
- Walter Goodnow Everett (A.B. 1885, A.M. 1888, Ph.D. 1895) – professor of Latin, Philosophy, and Natural Theology, Brown University
- Fred Feldman (Ph.D. 1968) – professor emeritus of Philosophy, University of Massachusetts Amherst
- Ruth Feldstein (A.M. 1989, Ph.D. 1996) – professor of History and American Studies, Rutgers University
- Ann Ferguson (Ph.D. 1965) – professor emerita of Philosophy and Women's Studies, University of Massachusetts Amherst
- Alison Fields (A.M. 2003) – Mary Lou Milner Carver Professor of Art of the American West, University of Oklahoma
- Richard Foley (Ph.D. 1975) – professor of Philosophy, New York University
- Richard Fumerton (A.M. 1973, Ph.D. 1974) – professor of Philosophy, University of Iowa
- Diana Fuss (Ph.D. 1988) – Louis W. Fairchild Class of ’24 Professor of English, Princeton University
- Kevin K. Gaines (Ph.D. 1991) – Julian Bond Professor of Civil Rights and Social Justice, University of Virginia
- Alexander R. Galloway (A.B. 1996) – professor of Media, Culture, and Communication, New York University

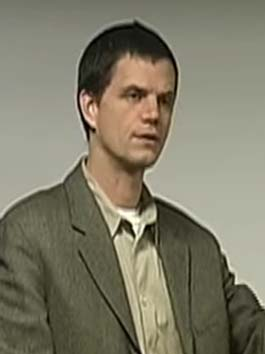
Alexander R. Galloway (1996)

- Edwin Gaustad (Ph.D. 1951) – professor of History, University of California, Riverside
- Gary Gerstle (A.B. 1976) – Paul Mellon Professor of American History, University of Cambridge
- Brie Gertler (Ph.D. 1997) – Commonwealth Professor of Philosophy and vice-provost for Academic Affairs, University of Virginia
- Katharine Gilbert (A.B. 1908, A.M. 1910) – professor of Philosophy, Duke University
- Steven M. Gillon (A.M. 1980, Ph.D. 1985) – professor of History, University of Oklahoma
- Laurence Goldstein (Ph.D. 1970) – professor of English Language and Literature, University of Michigan
- George Gorse (A.M. 1974, Ph.D. 1980) – Viola Horton Professor of Art History, Pomona College
- Lewis L. Gould (A.B. 1961) – Eugene C. Barker Centennial Professor in American History, University of Texas at Austin
- James Allen Graff (Ph.D. 1963) – professor of Philosophy, University of Toronto
- John Greco (Ph.D. 1989) – Robert L. McDevitt and Catherine H. McDevitt Professor of Philosophy, Georgetown University
- Roland Greene (A.B. 1979) – Mark Pigott KBE Professor, Anthony P. Meier Family Professor of the Humanities, director, Humanities Center, Stanford University; president, Modern Language Association (2015–16)
- Jonathan Grossman (A.B. 1989) – professor of English, University of California, Los Angeles
- Peter J. Haas (Ph.D. 1980) – Abba Hillel Silver Professor of Jewish Studies, Case Western Reserve University
- Charles G. Häberl (A.B. 1998) – professor of African, Middle Eastern, and South Asian Languages and Literatures and Religion, Rutgers University
- Casey Dué Hackney (A.B. 1996) – professor of Classical Studies, University of Houston
- Albert Harkness (1842) – founder of the American Philological Association and the American School of Classical Studies at Athens
- Marianne Hirsch (A.B., A.M. 1970, Ph.D. 1975) – William Peterfield Trent Professor of English and Comparative Literature, Columbia University
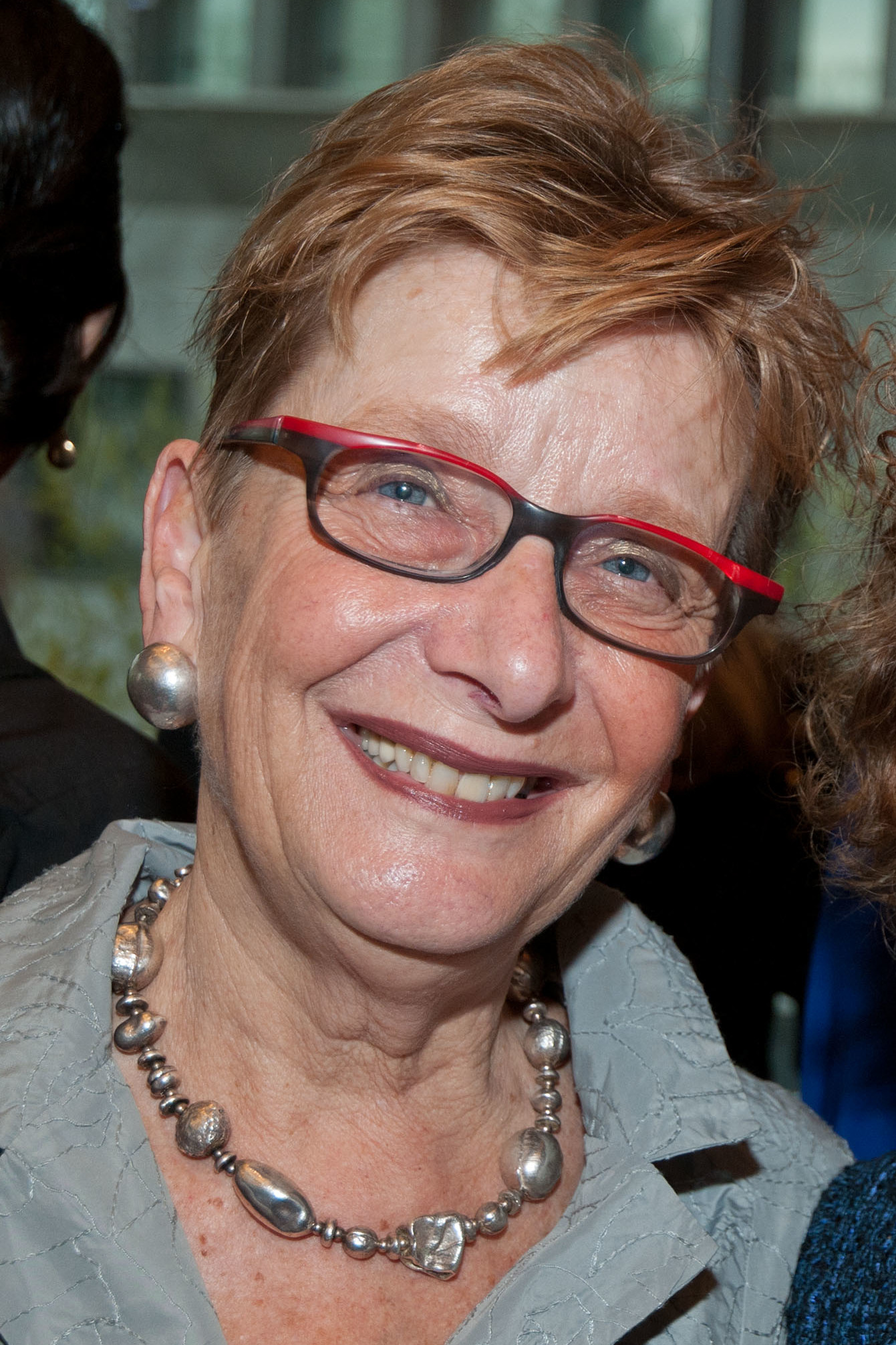
  Marianne Hirsch (1970, 1975)
- John Hattendorf (A.M. 1971) – Ernest J. King Professor Emeritus of Maritime History, United States Naval War College
- Dagmar Herzog (A.M. 1985, Ph.D. 1991) – Distinguished Professor of History, Daniel Rose Faculty Scholar, Graduate Center, CUNY
- Charles Hill (A.B. 1957) – senior Lecturer in the Humanities, Brady-Johnson Distinguished Fellow in Grand Strategy, Yale University
- Steve Hochstadt (1971) – professor of History, Illinois College
- Johan Anders Höglund (A.M. 1994) – professor of English Literature, Linnaeus University
- James S. Holmes (1948–1950) – founding figure in translation studies
- Maryanne Cline Horowitz (A.B. 1966) – professor of History, Occidental College
- Jean E. Howard (A.B. 1970) – George Delacorte Professor in the Humanities, Columbia University
- George B. Hutchinson (A.B. 1975) – Newton C. Farr Professor of American Culture, Cornell University
- Charles Ingrao (Ph.D. 1974) – professor of History Purdue University
- Matthew Frye Jacobson (Ph.D. 1992) – Sterling Professor of American Studies and History, Yale University
- Dale Jacquette (A.M. 1981, Ph.D. 1983) – professor ordinarius of Philosophy, University of Bern
- Gene Andrew Jarrett (A.M. 1999, Ph.D. 2002) – dean of the faculty and William S. Tod Professor of English, Princeton University
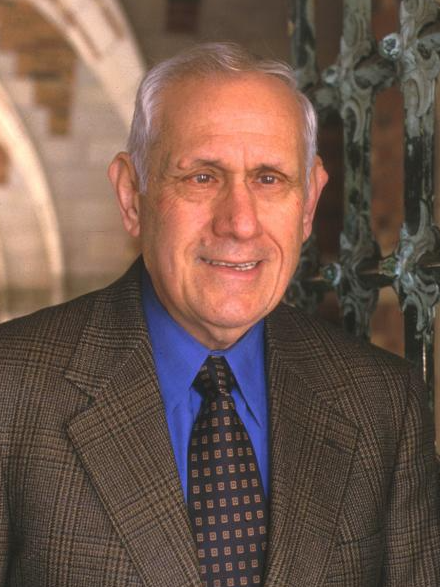
  Donald Kagan (1955)
- Ralina Joseph (A.B. 1996) – professor, Department of Communication, University of Washington
- Donald Kagan (A.M. 1955) – Sterling Professor Emeritus of Classics & History, Yale University; winner of the National Humanities Medal
- Natalie Kampen (Ph.D. 1976) – Barbara Novak Chair in Art History and Women’s Studies, Barnard College
- I. J. Kapstein (A.B. 1926, A.M. 1929, Ph.D. 1931) – professor in the English Department, Brown University
- David Kelley (A.B. 1971, A.M. 1971) – philosopher, founder of The Atlas Society
- Sean Dorrance Kelly (Sc.B. 1989, M.S. 1989) – Teresa G. and Ferdinand F. Martignetti Professor of Philosophy, Harvard University
- Ari Kelman (A.M. 1993, Ph.D. 1998) – Chancellor's Leadership Professor of History, University of California, Davis; winner of the 2014 Bancroft Prize
- Shenila Khoja-Moolji (A.B. 2005) – Hamad bin Khalifa al-Thani Endowed Chair of Muslim Societies, Georgetown University
- Karen Leigh King (Ph.D. 1984) – Hollis Professor of Divinity, Harvard University
- Lida Shaw King (A.M. 1894) – professor of Classical Literature and Archaeology, Brown University; Dean of Pembroke College
- Mark Kishlansky (A.M. 1972, Ph.D. 1977) – Frank Baird Jr. Professor of History, Harvard University
- Kevin Kopelson (Ph.D. 1991) – professor of English, University of Iowa
- Carolyn Korsmeyer (Ph.D. 1972) – professor emerita of Philosophy, University at Buffalo
- Jennifer Lackey (Ph.D. 2000) – Wayne and Elizabeth Jones Professor of Philosophy, Northwestern University
- Lori Hope Lefkovitz (A.M. 1980, Ph.D. 1984) – Ruderman Professor of Jewish Studies, Northeastern University
- Keith Lehrer (Ph.D. 1960) – Regents' Professor of Philosophy, Emeritus, University of Arizona
- Jeffrey Lesser (A.B. 1982, A.M. 1984) – Samuel Candler Dobbs Professor of History, Emory University
- Stuart Levine (A.M. 1956, Ph.D. 1958) – professor of English, University of Kansas
- Nancy MacLean (A.B. 1981, A.M. 1981) – William H. Chafe Professor of History and Public Policy, Duke University

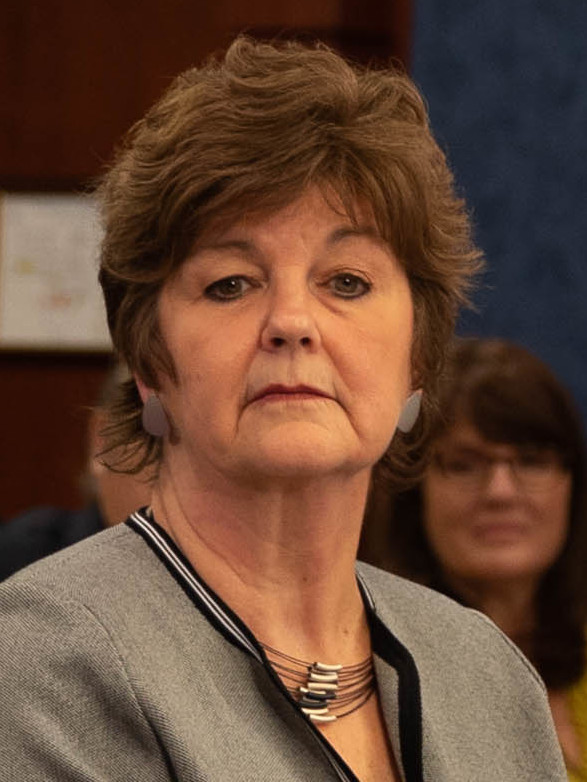
Nancy MacLean (1981)

- Nelson Maldonado-Torres (Ph.D. 2002) – professor of Philosophy, University of Connecticut
- Ajuan Mance (A.B. 1988) – professor of Ethnic Studies and English, Mills College at Northeastern University
- Ben Marcus (M.F.A. 1991) – professor of Writing, Columbia University
- Sharon Marcus (A.B. 1986) – Orlando Harriman Professor of English and Comparative Literature, Columbia University
- Monica Muñoz Martinez (A.B. 2006) – associate professor of History, UT Austin; recipient of the MacArthur Fellowship
- Brian Massumi (A.B. 1979) – philosopher and social theorist, former Professor of Communication, Université de Montréal
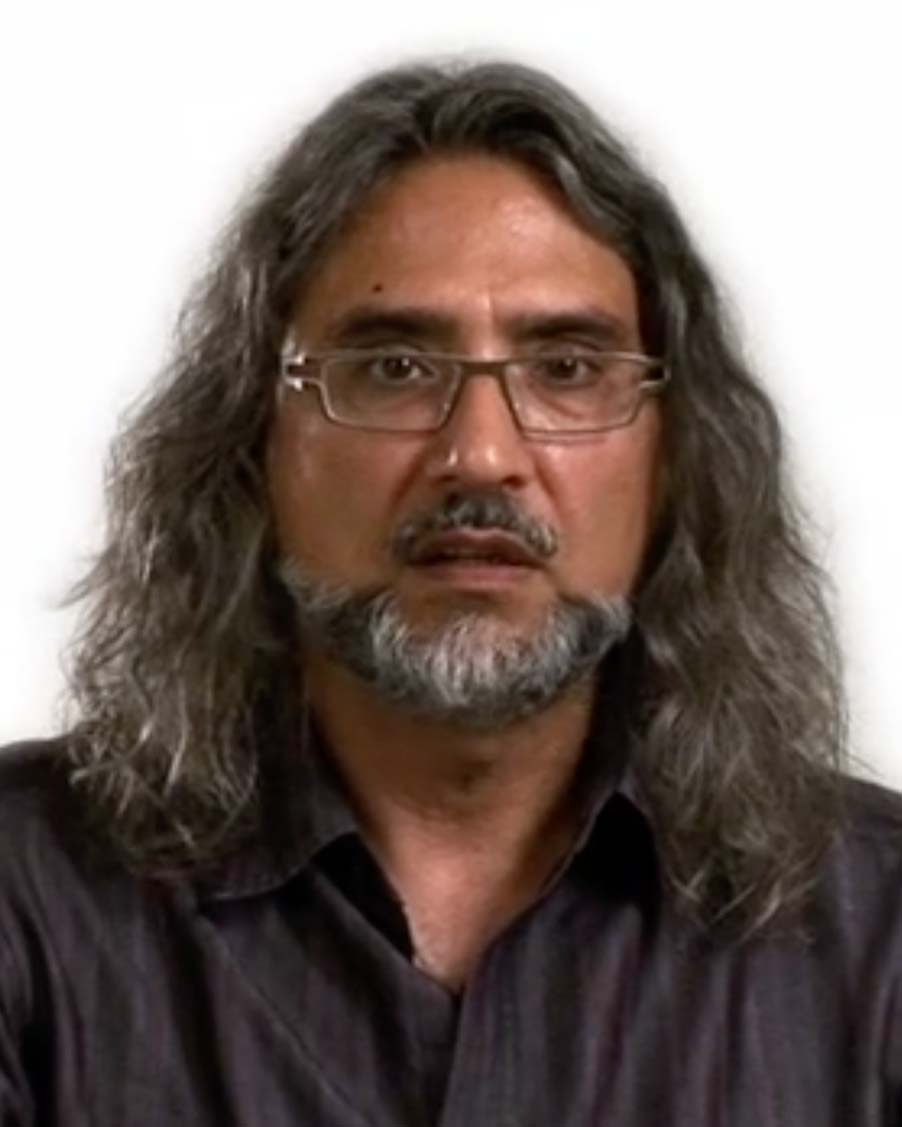
  Brian Massumi (1979)
- Dean L. May (Ph.D. 1974) – professor of History, University of Utah
- Brendan McConville (A.M. 1987, Ph.D. 1992) – professor of History, Boston University
- Edward McCrorie (Ph.D. 1970) – professor of English, Providence College
- Brian McHale (A.B. 1974) – Arts and Humanities Distinguished Professor, Ohio State University
- Jeffrey L. Meikle (A.B. 1971, A.M. 1971) – Stiles Professor in American Studies Emeritus, University of Texas at Austin
- Anne K. Mellor (A.B. 1963) – Distinguished Professor of English and Women's Studies, UCLA
- Sonya Michel – professor of History, University of Maryland, College Park
- Nara Milanich (A.B. 1994) – professor of History, Barnard College
- Keith N. Morgan (Ph.D. 1978) – professor of American and European Architecture, Boston University
- Wilson Jeremiah Moses (Ph.D. 1975) – professor of American History, Pennsylvania State University
- Mo Moulton (Ph.D. 2010) – professor of Modern British and Irish History, University of Birmingham
- Kurt Mueller-Vollmer (A.M. 1955) – professor of German Studies and Humanities, Stanford University
- Dana Carleton Munro (A.B. 1887, A.M. 1890) – Dodge Professor of History, Princeton University
- Margaret Ellen Newell (A.B. 1984) – professor of History, Ohio State University
- Jay Newman (A.M. 1969) – professor of Philosophy, University of Guelph
- Alyssa Ney (A.M. 2003, Ph.D. 2005) – professor and Chair of Metaphysics, LMU Munich
- Sianne Ngai (A.B. 1993) – Andrew W. Mellon Professor of English, University of Chicago
- Ronald J. Onorato (A.M. 1973, Ph.D. 1977) – professor of Art History and Chair of the Department of Art and Art History, University of Rhode Island
- Kathy Peiss (Ph.D. 1982) – Roy F. and Jeannette P. Nichols Professor of American History, University of Pennsylvania
- Rowan Ricardo Phillips (A.M. 1998, Ph.D. 2003) – Distinguished Professor of English, Stony Brook University
- Arthur Upham Pope (A.B. 1904) – expert on Iranian art; founder and first director, Asia Institute
- Gerald Prince (Ph.D. 1968) – professor of Romance Languages, University of Pennsylvania
- Sarah J. Purcell (A.M. 1993, Ph.D. 1997) – L.F. Parker Professor of History, Grinnell College
- J. Saunders Redding (A.B. 1928, A.M. 1932) – Ernest I. White Professor of American Studies, Cornell University
- Christina J. Riggs (A.B. 1993) – professor of the History of Visual Culture, Durham University
- Camille Robcis (A.B. 1999) – professor of History and French, Columbia University, recipient of a Guggenheim Fellowship
- Lillian Robinson (A.B. 1962, A.M. 1962) – professor of Women's Studies, Concordia University
- Daniel T. Rodgers (A.B., Sc.B. 1965) – Henry Charles Lea Professor of History Emeritus, Princeton University
- Tricia Rose (A.M. 1987, Ph.D. 1993) – Chancellor's Professor of Africana studies, director of the Center for the Study of Race and Ethnicity in America, Brown University
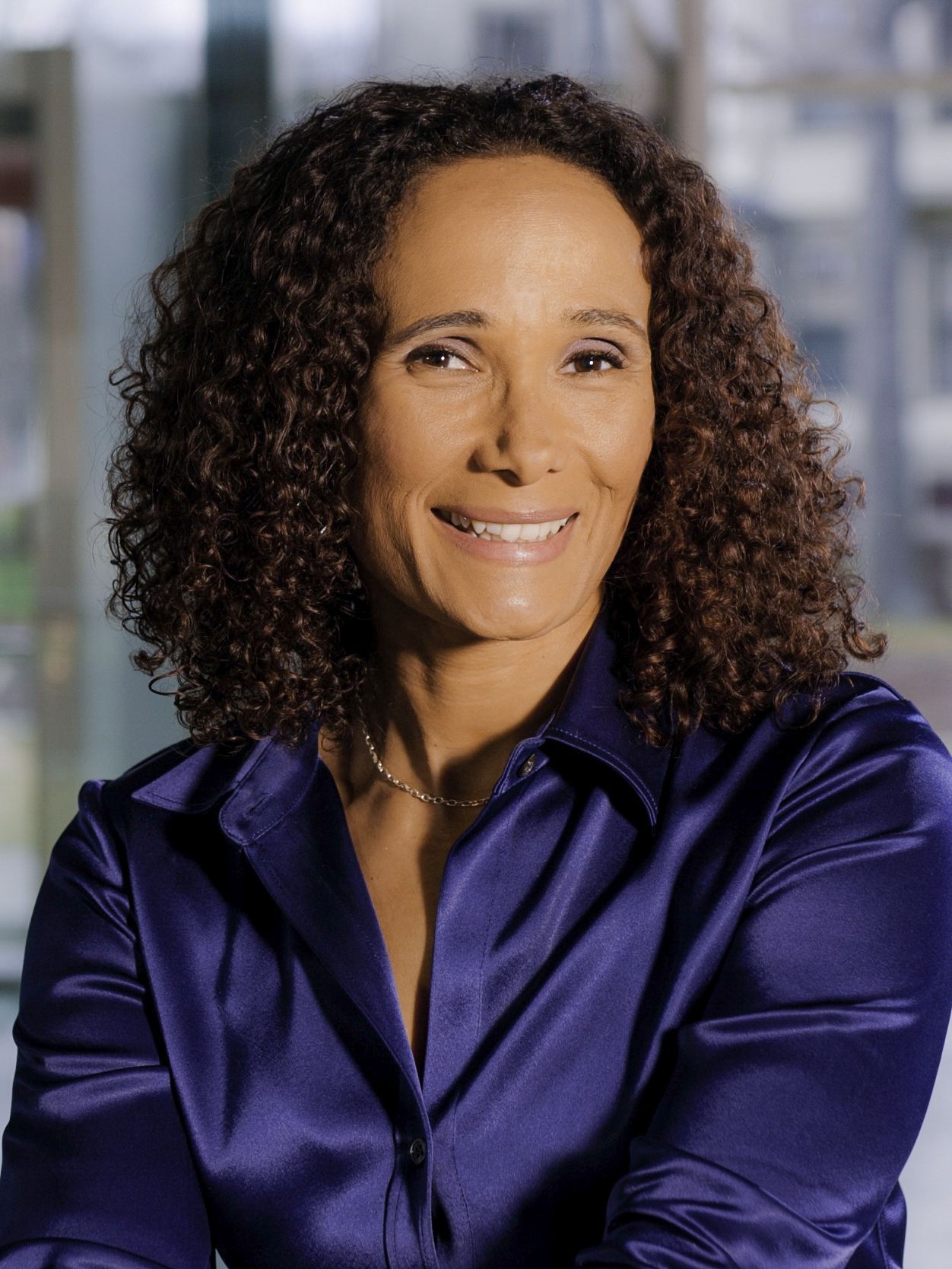
  Tricia Rose (1987, 1993)
- Alvin Hirsch Rosenfeld (Ph.D. 1967) – professor of English and M. Glazer Chair and Professor of Jewish Studies, Indiana University Bloomington
- Gavriel D. Rosenfeld (A.B. 1989) – professor of History, Fairfield University; president, Center for Jewish History
- Gary Rosenkrantz (Ph.D. 1976) – professor of Philosophy, University of North Carolina at Greensboro
- James F. Ross (Ph.D. 1958) – professor of Philosophy and Law, University of Pennsylvania
- Andrea Rusnock (A.B. 1982) – professor of History, University of Rhode Island
- Mari Ruti (A.B. 1988) – Distinguished Professor of Critical Theory and of Gender and Sexuality Studies, University of Toronto Mississauga
- Kent Ryden (Ph.D. 1991) – professor of American and New England Studies, University of Southern Maine
- Robert Rynasiewicz (Sc.B. 1974) – professor of Philosophy, Johns Hopkins University
- Catherine M. Sama (Ph.D. 1995) – professor of Italian, University of Rhode Island
- Theodore Schick (Ph.D. 1980) – professor of Philosophy, Muhlenberg College
- Nathan Schneider (A.B. 2006) – journalist; assistant professor of Media Studies, University of Colorado Boulder
- Alan D. Schrift (A.B. 1977) – F. Wendell Miller Professor Philosophy, Grinnell College
- Caroline T. Schroeder (A.B. 1993) – professor of Women's and Gender Studies, University of Oklahoma
- Daniel R. Schwarz (Ph.D. 1968) – Frederic J. Whiton Professor of English Literature & Stephen H. Weiss Presidential Fellow, Cornell University
- Julius S. Scott (A.B 1973) – scholar of slavery and Caribbean and Atlantic history, author, The Common Wind
- Russ Shafer-Landau (A.B. 1986) – Elliott R. Sober Professor of Philosophy, University of Wisconsin, Madison
- Ethan H. Shagan (A.B. 1994) – Zaffaroni Family Chair in Education of the History Department, UC Berkeley
- Prageeta Sharma (M.F.A. 1995) – Henry G. Lee Professor of English, Pomona College
- Dallas Lore Sharp (1895) – professor of English, Boston University
- Tracy Denean Sharpley-Whiting (Ph.D. 1994) – Gertrude Conaway Vanderbilt Distinguished Chair in the Humanities, professor of African American and Diaspora Studies, Vanderbilt University
- Francis W. Shepardson (A.B. 1883) – professor at the University of Chicago, first director of the Illinois Department of Registration and Education, secretary and director of the Rosenwald Fund
- Maxim D. Shrayer (A.B. 1989) – professor of Russian, English, and Jewish Studies, Boston University
- Kaja Silverman (Ph.D. 1977) – Katherine and Keith L. Sachs Professor of Art History, University of Pennsylvania
- Richard Slotkin (Ph.D. 1966) – Olin Professor of English Emeritus, Wesleyan University
- Timothy D. Snyder (A.B. 1991) – Richard C. Levin Professor of History, Yale University, Permanent Fellow at the Institute for Human Sciences

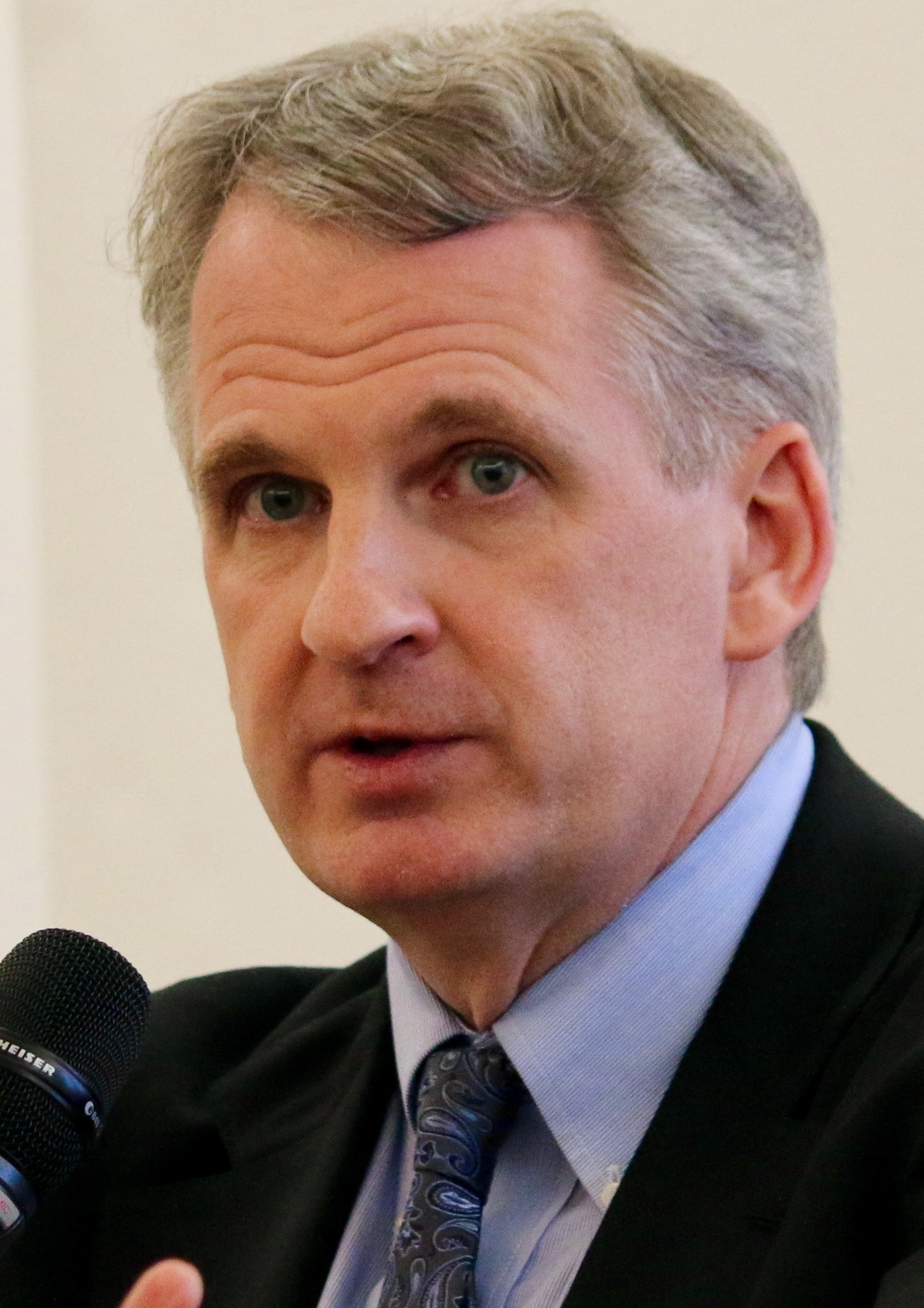
Timothy Snyder (1991)

- David Sosa (A.B. 1989) – professor and chair of Philosophy, University of Texas at Austin
- Barton Levi St. Armand (Ph.D. 1968) – professor emeritus of English and American Studies, Brown University
- Carol Stabile (Ph.D. 1992) – professor and dean, University of Oregon
- Sarah Abrevaya Stein (A.B. 1993) – Distinguished Professor and Viterbi Family Endowed Chair in Mediterranean Jewish Studies, UCLA
- Emily Steiner (A.B. 1993) – Rose Family Endowed Chair Professor of English, University of Pennsylvania
- Kathryn Bond Stockton (A.M. 1984, Ph.D. 1989) – Distinguished Professor of English, University of Utah
- David Summers (A.B. 1963) – William R. Kenan Jr. Professor Emeritus of Art Theory and Italian Renaissance Art, University of Virginia
- Pamela E. Swett (Ph.D. 1999) – professor in the Department of History and dean of the Faculty of Humanities, McMaster University
- Charles Taliaferro (A.M., Ph.D. 1984) – Oscar and Gertrude Boe Overby Distinguished Professor of Philosophy, St. Olaf College
- Ezra Tawil (Ph.D. 2000) – professor of English, University of Rochester
- Richard Clyde Taylor (Ph.D. 1959) – philosopher; subject of David Foster Wallace's prize-winning undergraduate thesis
- John L. Thomas (Ph.D. 1961) – George L. Littlefield Professor of American History Emeritus, Brown University; winner of the 1964 Bancroft Prize
- C. Bradley Thompson (Ph.D. 1993) – BB&T Research Professor in the Department of Political Science, Clemson University
- Salamishah Tillet (M.A.T. 1997) – Henry Rutgers Professor of African American Studies and Creative Writing, Rutgers University–Newark; recipient of the Pulitzer Prize for Criticism
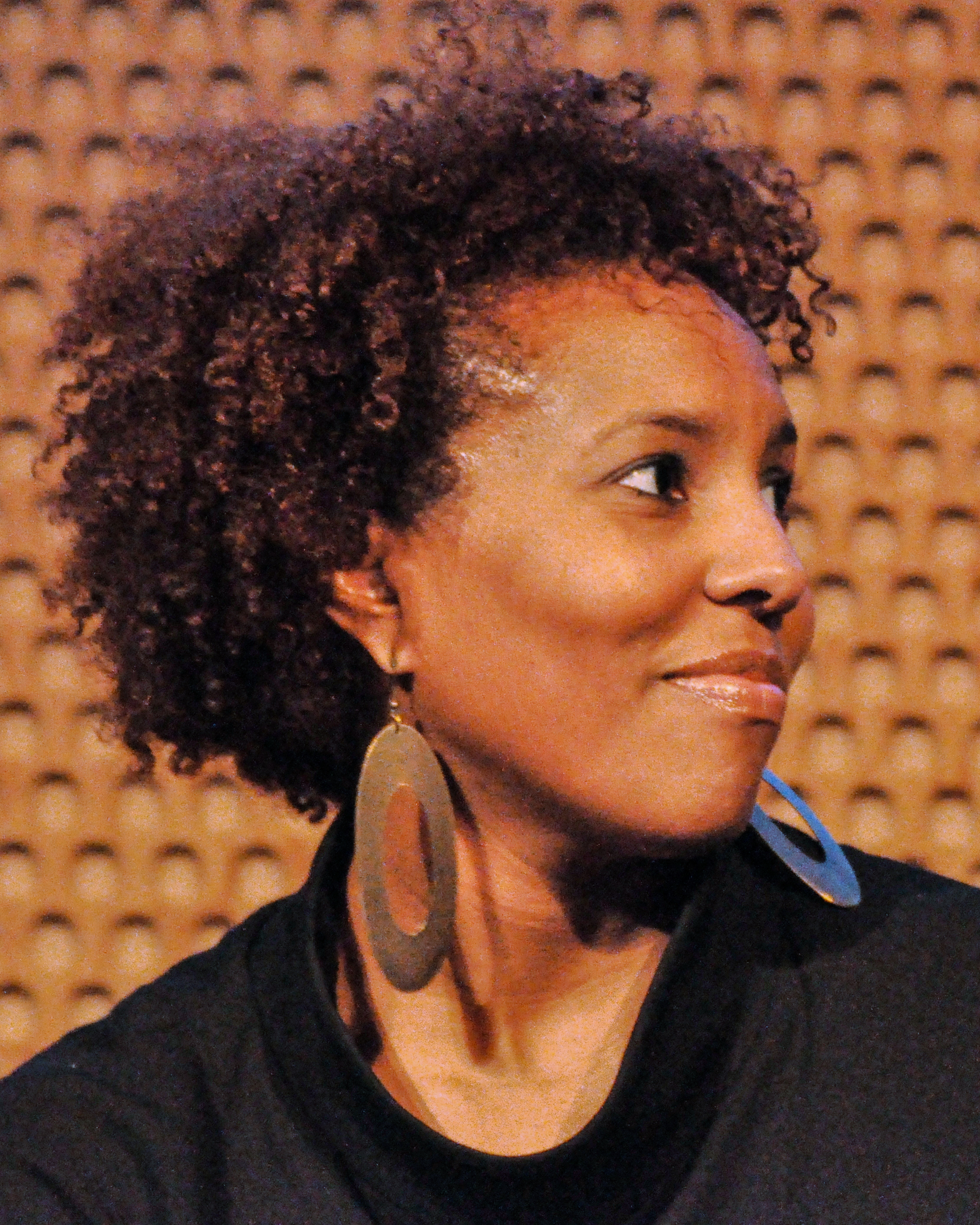
  Salamishah Tillet (1997)
- Francesca Trivellato (Ph.D. 2004) – Andrew W Mellon Professor in the School of Historical Studies, Institute for Advanced Study
- Adam Ulam (A.B. 1943) – Gurney Professor of History and Political Science, Harvard University; one of the world's foremost authorities on Russia and the Soviet Union
- Dell Upton (M.A. 1975, Ph.D. 1980) – chair of the Department of Art History, UCLA
- Jeremy Varon (A.B. 1989) – professor of History, The New School for Social Research
- Harry L. Watson (A.B. 1971) – Atlanta Distinguished Professor in Southern Culture, University of North Carolina at Chapel Hill
- Geoffrey Wawro (A.B. 1983) – professor of Military History and director of the Military History Center, University of North Texas
- Daniel Weiskopf (A.M. 1999) – professor of Philosophy, Georgia State University
- Jacqueline Wernimont (A.M 2005, Ph.D. 2009) – Distinguished Chair in Digital Humanities and Social Engagement, Dartmouth College
- Charles Edwin Wilbour (Class of 1854) – Egyptologist, co-discoverer of the Elephantine Papyri
- Mel Yoken (M.A.T. 1961) – Chancellor Professor Emeritus of French Language and Literature, University of Massachusetts Dartmouth
- Mari Yoshihara (A.M. 1992, Ph.D. 1997) – professor of American Studies, University of Hawaiʻi at Mānoa
- Dean Zimmerman (Ph.D. 1992) – Distinguished Professor of Philosophy, Rutgers University
- Steven Zwicker (Ph.D. 1969) – Stanley Elkin Professor in the Humanities, Washington University in St. Louis

=== Law ===
- Herman Vandenburg Ames – legal scholar, professor of American Constitutional History, University of Pennsylvania
- Richard Reeve Baxter (A.B. 1942) – judge, International Court of Justice; Manley Hudson Professor of Law, Harvard Law School
- Karima Bennoune (A.B. 1988) – Louis M. Simes Professor of Law, University of Michigan
- Samuel W. Buell (A.B. 1987) – Bernard M. Fishman Distinguished Professor of Law, Duke University School of Law
- Zechariah Chafee (A.B. 1907) – First Amendment scholar; University Professor of Law, Harvard University
- Sarah Cleveland (A.B. 1987) – Louis Henkin Professor of Human and Constitutional Rights, Columbia Law School

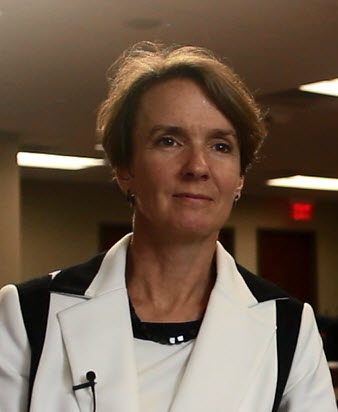
Sarah Cleveland (1987)

- Jennifer Daskal (A.B. 1994) – professor of Law, Washington College of Law at American University
- Lawrence Douglas (A.B. 1982) – James J. Grosfeld Professor of Law, Jurisprudence and Social Thought, Amherst College
- Justin Driver (A.B. 1997) – Robert R. Slaughter Professor of Law, Yale Law School
- Heidi Li Feldman (A.B. 1986) – professor of Law, Georgetown University Law Center
- Daniel Fischel (A.M. 1974) – Lee and Brena Freeman Professor Emeritus of Law and Business and dean emeritus, University of Chicago Law School
- James Forman Jr. (A.B. 1988) – J. Skelly Wright Professor of Law, Yale Law School; Pulitzer Prize-winning writer, Locking Up Our Own: Crime and Punishment in Black America

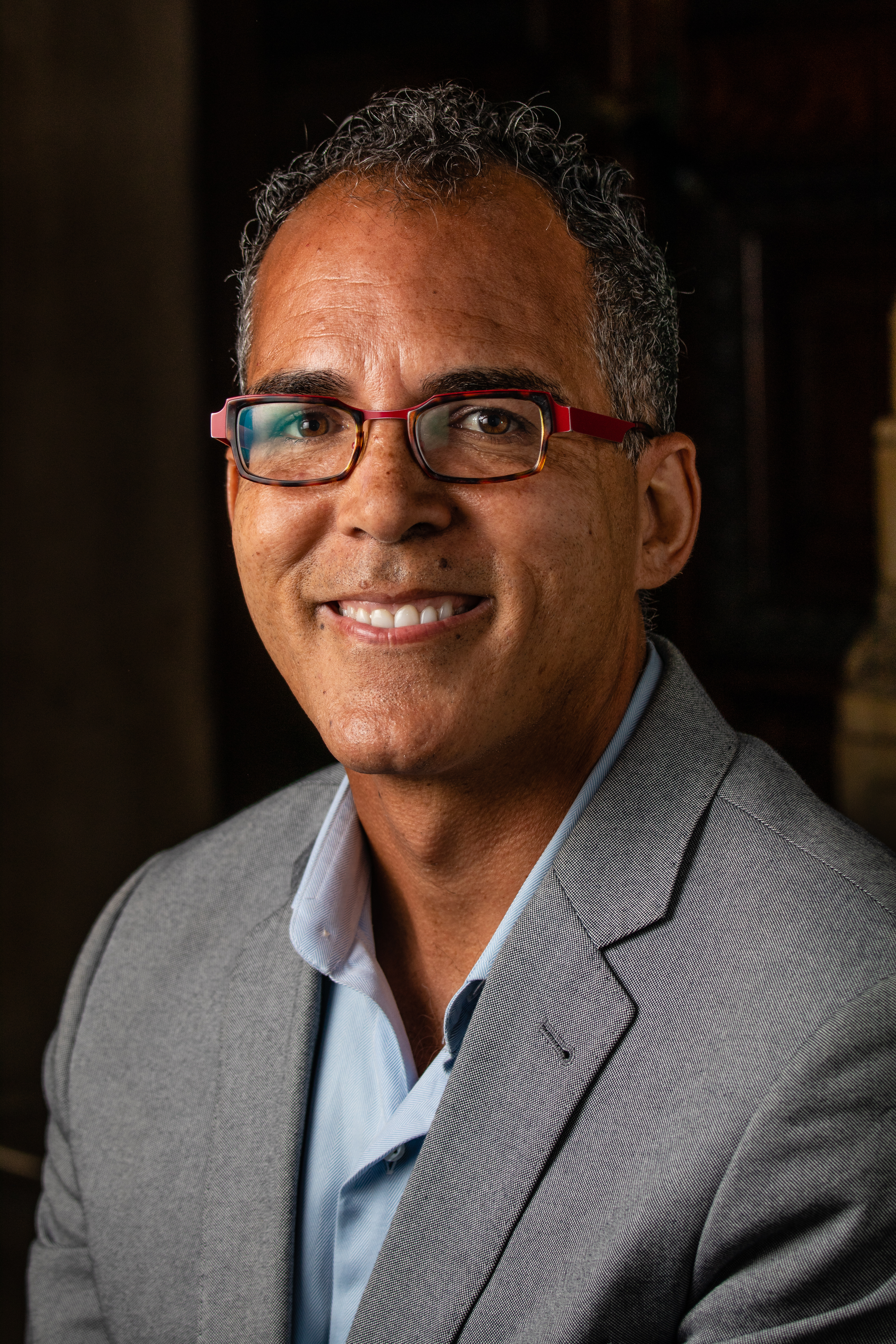
James Forman Jr (1988)

- Jacob Gersen (A.B. 1996) – Sidley Austin Professor of Law, Harvard Law School
- Kent Greenfield (A.B. 1984) – professor of Law and Dean's Distinguished Scholar, Boston College Law School
- Thomas D. Griffith (A.B. 1971) – John B. Milliken Professor of Taxation, USC Gould School of Law
- Henry B. Hansmann (A.B. 1967) – Oscar M. Ruebhausen Professor Emeritus of Law, Yale Law School
- Harold Dexter Hazeltine (A.B. 1894) – Downing Professor of the Laws of England (1919–1942), University of Cambridge
- Sonia Katyal (A.B. 1993) – Distinguished Haas Chair, UC Berkeley School of Law
- David Kennedy (A.B. 1976) – Manley O. Hudson Professor of Law and director of the Institute for Global Law and Policy, Harvard Law School
- Kit Kinports (A.B 1976) – professor of Law and the Polisher Family Distinguished Faculty Scholar, Pennsylvania State University
- Roberta Rosenthal Kwall (A.B. 1977) – Raymond P. Niro Professor, DePaul University College of Law
- Margaret Kwoka (A.B. 2002) – Frank R. Strong Chair in Law, Ohio State University Moritz College of Law
- Alexandra Lahav (A.B. 1993) – Anthony W. and Lulu C. Wang Professor of Law, Cornell Law School
- Eric Lane (A.B. 1965) – Eric J. Schmertz Distinguished Professor of Public Law and Public Service, Maurice A. Deane School of Law
- Margaret Lemos (A.B. 1997) – Robert G. Seaks Distinguished Professor of Law, Duke University School of Law
- Alan Lizotte (A.B. 1974) – Distinguished Professor, University at Albany, SUNY School of Criminal Justice
- Bruce H. Mann (A.B. 1972, A.M. 1972) – Carl F. Schipper Jr. Professor of Law at Harvard Law School, husband of U.S. Senator Elizabeth Warren
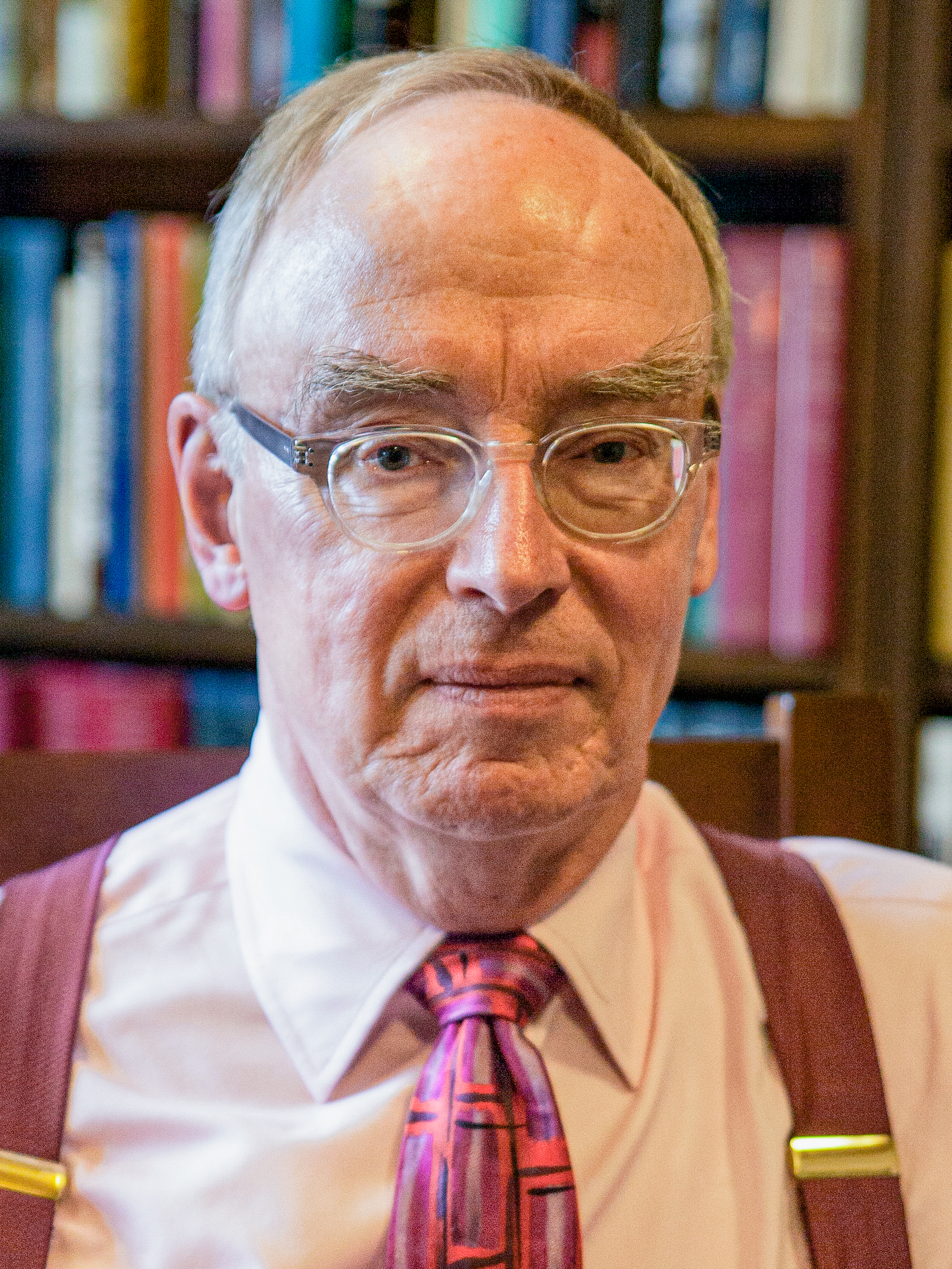
  Bruce H. Mann (1972)
- Eric L. Muller (1984) – Dan K. Moore Distinguished Professor of Law in Jurisprudence and Ethics, University of North Carolina School of Law
- Douglas NeJaime (A.B. 2000) – Anne Urowsky Professor of Law, Yale Law School
- Peter Pitegoff (1975) – professor of Law Emeritus and former Dean, University of Maine School of Law
- Wendell Pritchett (A.B. 1986) – James S. Riepe Presidential Professor of Law and Education, University of Pennsylvania Law School
- Lucy Reed (A.B. 1974) – professor of Practice, National University of Singapore Faculty of Law
- Alexander A. Reinert (A.B. 1994) – Max Freund Professor of Litigation & Advocacy, Cardozo School of Law at Yeshiva University
- Vincent Rougeau (A.B. 1985) – president, College of the Holy Cross; Dean Emeritus, Boston College Law School
- Paul M. Schwartz (A.B. 1981) – Jefferson E. Peyser Professor of Law, UC Berkeley School of Law
- Kate A. Shaw (A.B. 2001) – professor of Law, University of Pennsylvania Law School
- Harry Shulman (A.B. 1923) – dean emeritus, Yale Law School
- Kenneth Starr (A.M. 1969) – Duane and Kelly Roberts Dean Emeritus, Pepperdine University School of Law; solicitor general of the United States (1989–93); independent counsel for the Whitewater controversy; 14th president of Baylor University
- Francis Wayland III (A.B. 1846) – dean emeritus, Yale Law School
- George Grafton Wilson (A.B. 1886, A.M. 1888, Ph.D. 1891) – professor of International Law, Harvard University; professor of International Law, Naval War College

=== Medicine and public health ===
- Jennifer Ahern (A.B. 1997) – associate dean for Research and King Sweesy and Robert Womack Endowed Chair, UC Berkeley School of Public Health
- Cheryl A. M. Anderson (A.B. 1992) – professor and dean, Herbert Wertheim School of Public Health, UC San Diego
- Louise Aronson (A.B. 1986) – author; professor of Geriatrics, University of California, San Francisco
- Ann Arvin (A.B. 1966) – Lucile Salter Packard Professor of Pediatrics and Professor of Microbiology and Immunology Emerita, Stanford University School of Medicine
- John M. Barry (A.B. 1968) – author; professor, Tulane University School of Public Health and Tropical Medicine
- Linda Bartoshuk (Ph.D. 1965) – Presidential Endowed Professor of Community Dentistry and Behavioral Science, University of Florida
- Aaron T. Beck (A.B. 1942) – "father of cognitive behavioral therapy"; founder of the Beck Institute for Cognitive Behavior Therapy at the University of Pennsylvania; winner of the Lasker Award
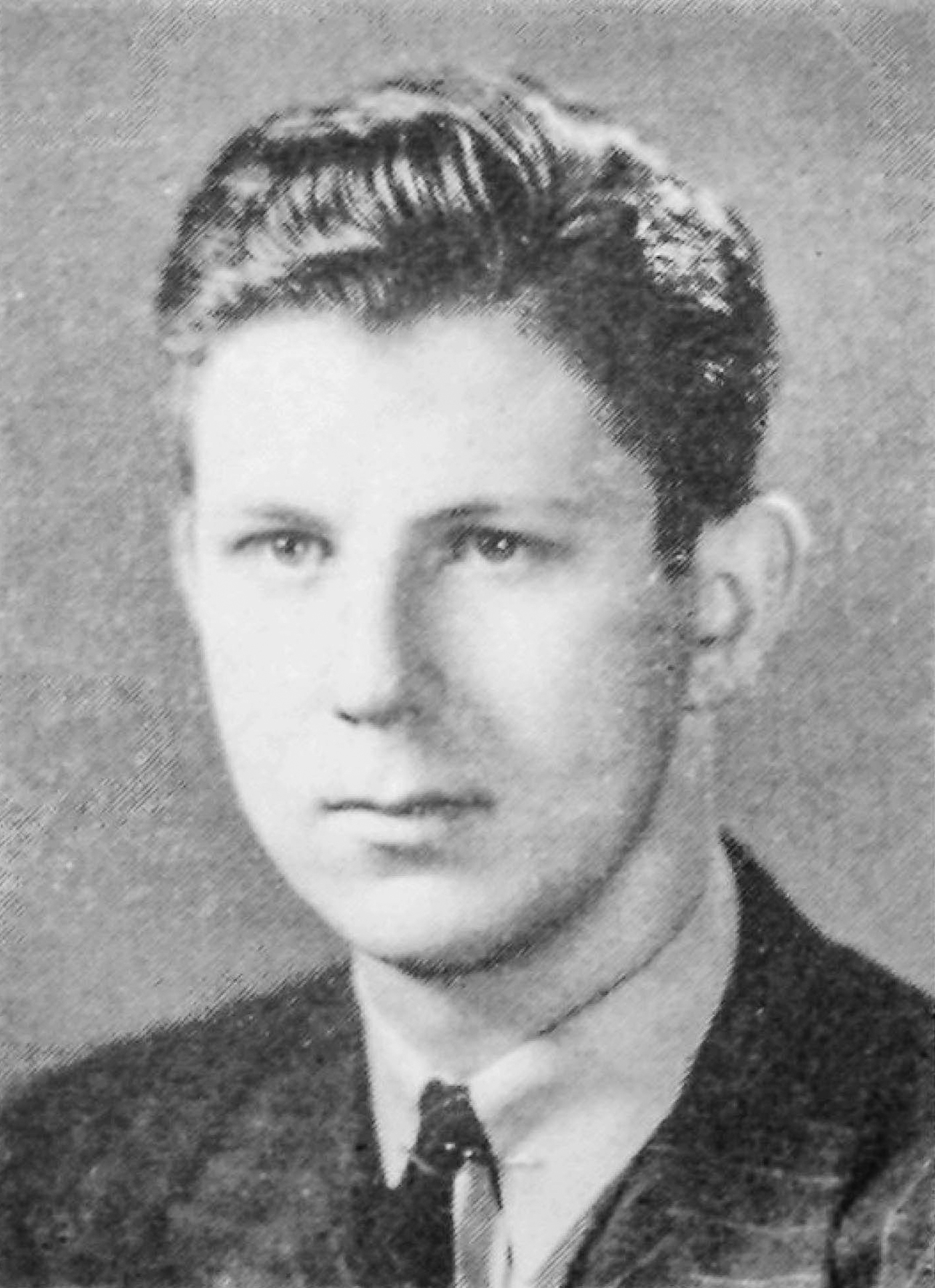
  Aaron T. Beck (1942)
- Jonathan Berek (M.Sc. 1973) – Laurie Kraus Lacob Professor, Stanford University School of Medicine
- Mark S. Blumenkranz (A.B. 1972, M.D. 1975, M.MSc 1976) – H.J. Smead Professor Emeritus, Stanford University School of Medicine
- George A. Bray (A.B. 1953) – Boyd Professor Emeritus and chief of the Division of Clinical Obesity and Metabolism, Pennington Biomedical Research Center, Louisiana State University
- Atul Butte (A.B. 1991, M.D. 1995) – Priscilla Chan and Mark Zuckerberg Distinguished Professor, University of California, San Francisco; director, Baker Computational Health Sciences Institute
- Peter Calabresi (M.D. 1988) – professor of Neurology, Neuroscience, and Ophthalmology, Johns Hopkins School of Medicine
- Christopher G. Chute (A.B. 1977, M.D. 1982) – Bloomberg Distinguished Professor of Health Informatics, Johns Hopkins University
- John A. Cooper (Sc.B. 1977) – professor of Biochemistry and Molecular Biophysics, Washington University School of Medicine
- Barry R. Davis (Ph.D. 1982) – Guy S. Parcel Chair in Public Health and Professor of Biostatistics and Data Science, UTHealth School of Public Health
- Allen Dyer (A.B. 1967, M.M.Sc. 1970) – professor of Psychiatry and Behavioral Sciences, George Washington University
- Barbara E. Ehrlich (Sc.B. 1974) – professor of Pharmacology and of Cellular And Molecular Physiology, Yale School of Medicine
- Nancy Etcoff (A.B.) – assistant clinical professor in Psychology, Harvard Medical School
- Stanley Falkow (Ph.D. 1961) – "father of microbiology", discoverer of the molecular nature of antibiotic resistance; Robert W. and Vivian K. Cahill Professor of Microbiology and Immunology, Stanford University School of Medicine; winner of the Lasker Award
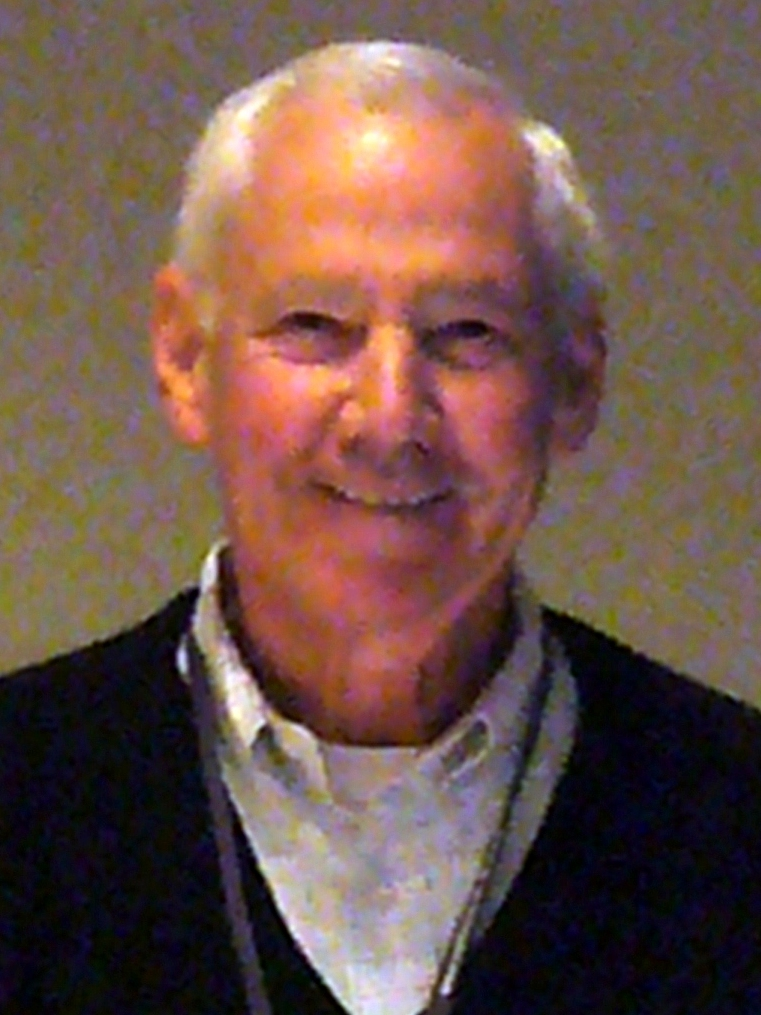
  Stanley Falkow (1961)
- James D. Griffin (A.B. 1970) – professor, Harvard Medical School; chair of Medical Oncology, Dana–Farber Cancer Institute; director of Medical Oncology, Brigham and Women's Hospital
- Hermes Grillo (1943) – professor of Surgery, Harvard Medical School
- Tina Hartert (A.B. 1985) – Lulu H. Owen Chair in Medicine and vice president of Translational Research, Vanderbilt University
- Arthur L. Horwich (A.B. 1972, M.D. 1975) – Sterling Professor of Genetics and Professor of Pediatrics, Yale School of Medicine; winner of the Lasker Award, Shaw Prize, and Breakthrough Prize; discoverer of the functions and mechanisms of chaperone-mediated protein folding
- Howard Hu (B.Sc. 1976) – Flora L. Thornton Chair and professor of Population and Public Health Sciences, Keck School of Medicine of USC; founding dean, Dalla Lana School of Public Health at the University of Toronto
- William Kessen (Sc.M. 1950) – Eugene Higgins Professor Emeritus of Psychology and Professor of Pediatrics, Yale University
- Jim Yong Kim (A.B. 1982) – president, Dartmouth College; co-founder of Partners in Health; professor of Medicine and Social Medicine and chair of the Department of Social Medicine at Harvard Medical School; chief of the Division of Social Medicine and Health Inequalities at Brigham and Women's Hospital; director of the François-Xavier Bagnoud Center for Health and Human Rights; former director of the World Health Organization's HIV/AIDS department; recipient of the Macarthur fellowship; 12th President of the World Bank

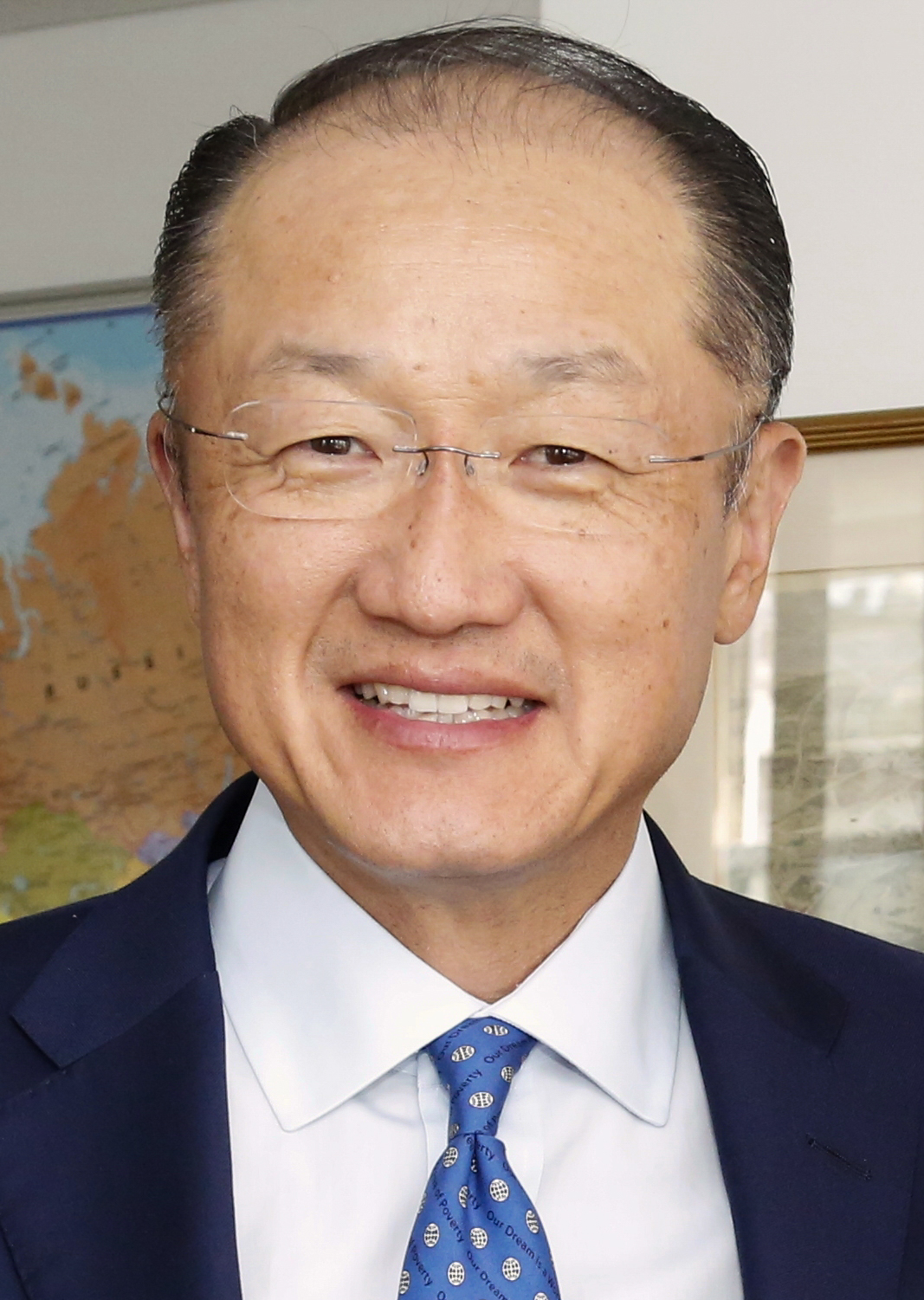
Jim Yong Kim (1982)

- E. Paul Larrat (Ph.D. 1992) – dean and professor, University of Rhode Island College of Pharmacy
- Michael T. Lawton (Sc.B. 1986) – president, CEO, Robert F. Spetzler Endowed Chair for Neurosciences, and chair of the Department of Neurosurgery, Barrow Neurological Institute
- Hey-Kyoung Lee (Ph.D. 1997) – professor of Neuroscience, Johns Hopkins School of Medicine
- Beth Levine (A.B. 1981) – Charles Cameron Sprague Distinguished Chair in Biomedical Sciences, UT Southwestern Medical Center
- Jonathan S. Lewin (A.B. 1981) – executive vice president of Health Affairs, Emory University; professor, Emory School of Medicine and Rollins School of Public Health
- David C. Lewis (A.B. 1957) – professor emeritus of Medicine and Community Health and Donald G. Millar Distinguished Professor of Alcohol and Addiction Studies, Brown University.
- Stacy Tessler Lindau (M.D. 1996) – Catherine Lindsay Dobson Professor of Obstetrics and Gynecology and director of the Program in Integrative Sexual Medicine Director, University of Chicago
- Jay Loeffler – Joan Suit Professor of Radiation Oncology and professor of Neurosurgery, Harvard Medical School; chair, Department of Radiation Oncology, Massachusetts General Hospital
- Zachary London (A.B. 1997) – James W. Albers Collegiate Professor of Neurology, University of Michigan Medicine
- George Makari (A.B. 1982) – professor of Psychiatry and director of the De Witt Wallace Institute for the History of Psychiatry, Weill Cornell Medicine
- Alden March (M.D. 1820) – co-founder and chair of Surgery, Albany Medical College
- Joseph Matarazzo (A.B. 1946) – 98th president of the American Psychological Association, chair of the first department of medical psychology in the United States
- Jessica Meir (A.B. 1999) – NASA astronaut; former assistant professor of Anesthesia, Harvard Medical School
- Craig C. Mello (Sc.B. 1982) – Nobel laureate (2006, Physiology or Medicine); Blais University Chair in Molecular Medicine, University of Massachusetts Medical School

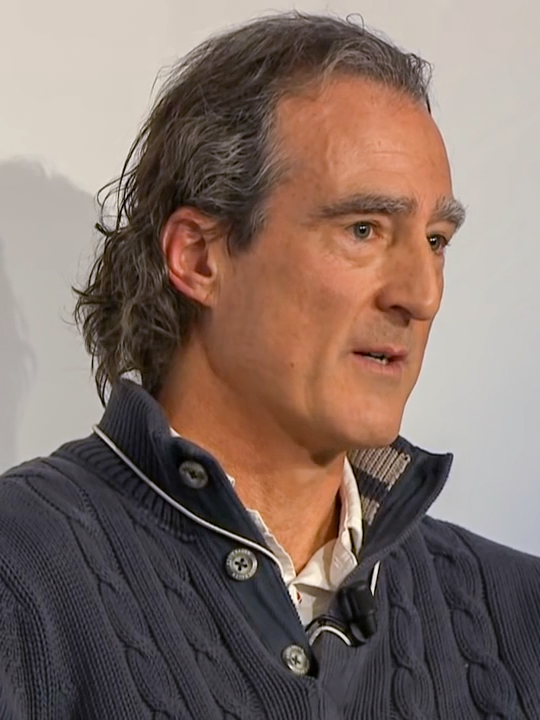
Craig C. Mello (1982)

- Lloyd B. Minor (Sc.B. 1979, M.D. 1982) – Carl and Elizabeth Naumann Dean, Stanford University School of Medicine; former provost and senior vice president of Academic Affairs, Johns Hopkins University

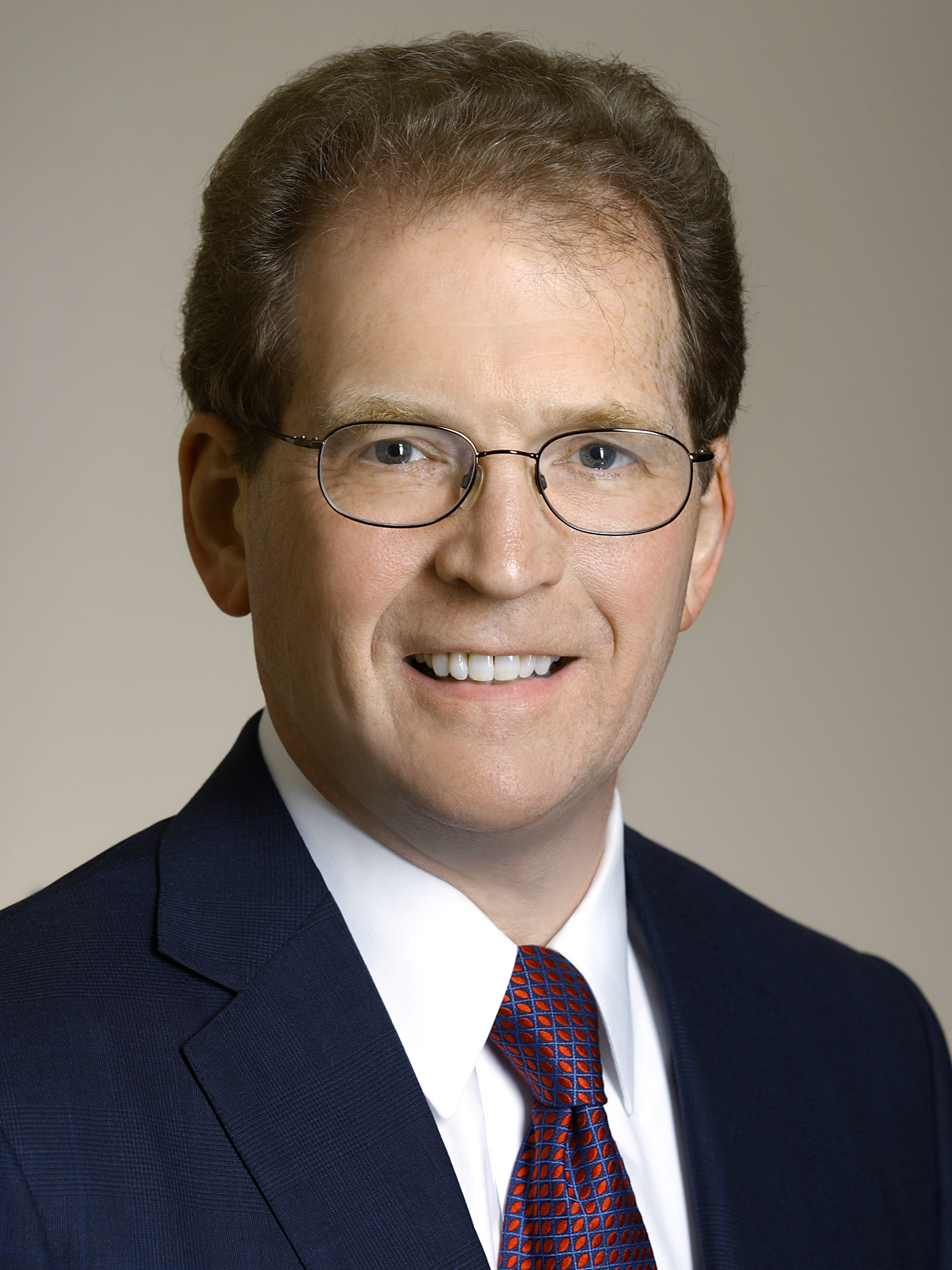
Lloyd B. Minor (1979, 1982)

- Nandita Mitra (A.B. 1992) – professor in the Department of Biostatistics and Epidemiology, Perelman School of Medicine, University of Pennsylvania
- Charles N. Mock (Sc.B. 1977, M.D. 1980) – professor of Global Health, Surgery, and Epidemiology, University of Washington
- Mark Musen (Sc.B. 1977, M.D. 1980) – professor of Biomedical Informatics and of Biomedical Data Science, Stanford University; director, Stanford Center for Biomedical Informatics Research
- Srihari S. Naidu (Sc.B. 1993, M.D. 1997) – professor of Medicine, New York Medical College
- Jordan S. Orange (A.B., Ph.D., 1996, M.D., 1997) – chair of Pediatrics, Columbia University College of Physicians and Surgeons; Pediatrician-in-Chief of New York-Presbyterian/Morgan Stanley Children's Hospital
- Thomas G. Plante (Sc.B. 1982) – clinical psychologist; Augustin Cardinal Bea, S.J. University Professor of Psychology, Santa Clara University
- Arnold B. Rabson (Sc.B. 1977, M.D. 1980) – Laura Gallagher Chair of Developmental Biology, Robert Wood Johnson Medical School
- Robert Lawrence Randall (A.B. 1988) – David Linn Endowed Chair in Orthopaedic Surgery and Chair of the Department of Orthopaedic Surgery, UC San Diego
- Kathleen Rasmussen (A.B. 1970) – Nancy Schlegel Meinig Professor of Maternal and Child Nutrition, Cornell University
- Steven Rasmussen (A.B. 1974, M.Ms 1977, M.D. 1977) – professor and chair of the Department of Psychiatry and Human Behavior, Alpert Medical School
- JoAnne S. Richards (M.A.T. 1969, Ph.D. 1971) – professor of Molecular and Cellular Biology and director, Cell Biology Graduate Program, Baylor College of Medicine
- Paul Ridker (Sc.B. 1981) – Eugene Braunwald Professor of Medicine, Harvard Medical School; director of the Center for Cardiovascular Disease Prevention, Brigham and Women's Hospital
- Dean Schillinger (A.B. 1986) – Andrew B. Bindman Endowed Professor in Health Policy and Primary Care, UCSF
- William Seeley (A.B. 1993) – Zander Family Endowed Professor in Neurology, UCSF; recipient of the Macarthur fellowship
- Gail G. Shapiro – clinical professor of Pediatrics, University of Washington School of Medicine
- Marc Siegel (A.B. 1978) – clinical professor of Medicine, New York University Grossman School of Medicine
- Janet Sinsheimer (Sc.B. 1979) – professor of Biostatistics, Biomathematics, and Human Genetics, Fielding School of Public Health, UCLA
- Nancy D. Spector (A.B. 1986) – professor of Pediatrics, Drexel University College of Medicine
- Manfred Steiner (Ph.D. 2022) – Professor of Medicine, Alpert Medical School
- Peter J. Taub (A.B. 1989) – professor of Surgery, Pediatrics, Dentistry, Neurosurgery, and Medical Education, Icahn School of Medicine at Mount Sinai
- Michael Terman (Sc.M. 1966, Ph.D. 1968) – professor of Clinical Psychology in Psychiatry, Columbia University College of Physicians and Surgeons
- Jeffrey Townsend (Sc.B. 1994) – Elihu Professor of Biostatistics and Professor of Ecology and Evolutionary Biology, Yale School of Public Health
- Ernest Tyzzer (1897) – Professor and Head of the Department of Comparative Pathology, Harvard University
- Thomas Wadden (A.B. 1975) – Albert J. Stunkard Professor of Psychology in Psychiatry, Perelman School of Medicine at the University of Pennsylvania
- Marjorie Wang (A.B. 1991) – professor of Neurosurgery, Medical College of Wisconsin
- Augustus A. White (A.B. 1957) – Ellen and Melvin Gordon Distinguished Professor of Medical Education and Professor of Orthopedic Surgery, Harvard Medical School
- Cheng Yung-chi (Ph.D. 1972) – Henry Bronson Professor of Pharmacology, Yale School of Medicine

=== Natural sciences ===
- Anthony Aguirre (Sc.B. 1995) – Faggin Family Presidential Chair for the Physics of Information, UC Santa Cruz
- Stephon Alexander (Ph.D. 2000) – theoretical physicist and musician, professor of Physics, Brown University
- Edgar Allen (Sc.B. 1915, A.M. 1916, Ph.D. 1921) – anatomist and physiologist, discoverer of estrogen and father of endocrinology
- Amy Arnsten (A.B. 1976) – Albert E. Kent Professor of Neuroscience and Professor of Psychology, Yale University
- Raymond Arvidson (Ph.D. 1974) – James S. McDonnell Distinguished University Professor of Earth and Planetary Sciences, Washington University in St. Louis
- Biman Bagchi (Ph.D. 1980) – biophysical chemist, theoretical chemist; Amrut Mody Professor, Indian Institute of Science
- Alison Barth (A.B. 1991) – Maxwell H. and Gloria C. Connan Professor in the Life Sciences, Carnegie Mellon University

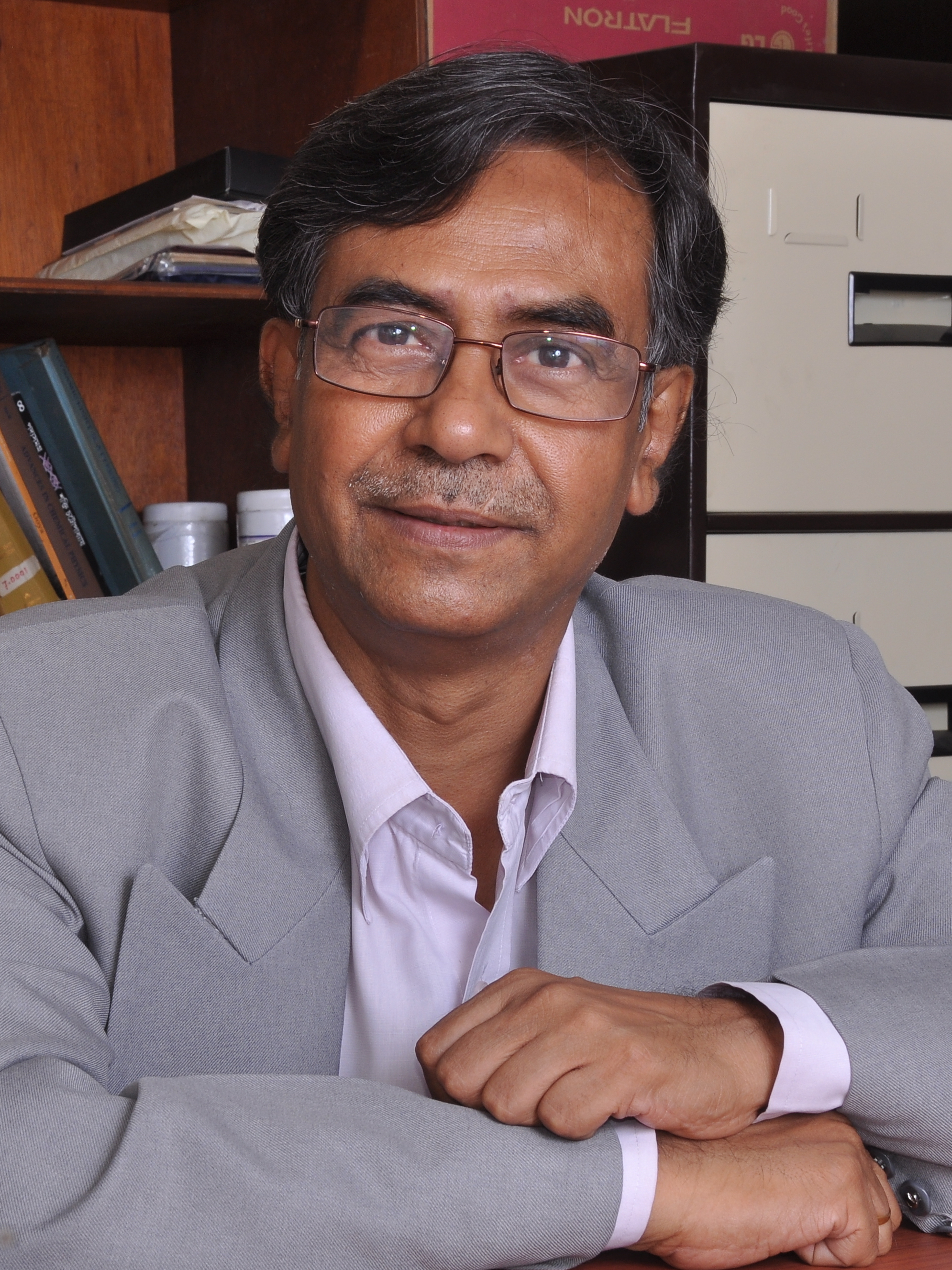
Biman Bagchi (1980)

- Mark Bear (Ph.D. 1984) – Picower Professor of Neuroscience, Picower Institute for Learning and Memory, MIT; former Howard Hughes Medical Investigator
- Joy M. Bergelson (Sc.B. 1984) – Dorothy Schiff Professor of Genomics, New York University
- Amos Binney (1821) – co-founder and president, Boston Society of Natural History
- Janice Bishop (Ph.D. 1994) – Planetary Exploration chair, senior research scientist, SETI Institute
- Dan Britt (Sc.M. 1987, Ph.D. 1991) – Pegasus Professor of Astronomy and Planetary Sciences, University of Central Florida
- Marianne Bronner (Sc.B. 1975) – Edward B. Lewis Professor of Biology; director of the Beckman Institute, California Institute of Technology
- Judith Bronstein (A.B. 1979) – University Distinguished Professor of Ecology and Evolutionary Biology, University of Arizona
- Stephen L. Buchwald (Sc.B. 1977) – Camille Dreyfus Professor of Chemistry, MIT; developed Buchwald-Hartwig amination
- Richard E. Carson (Sc.B. 1977) – professor of Radiology and Biomedical Imaging and of Biomedical Engineering, Yale University
- William A. Catterall (A.B. 1968) – professor of Pharmacology, University of Washington School of Medicine
- Ying Chongfu (Ph.D. 1951) – research professor, Institute of Acoustics, Chinese Academy of Sciences
- Andrew G. Clark (Sc.B. 1976) – Jacob Gould Schurman Professor of Population Genetics and Chair of Computational Biology, Cornell University
- Julia Clarke (A.B. 1995) – John A. Wilson Professor in Vertebrate Paleontology, University of Texas at Austin
- Sankar Das Sarma (Ph.D. 1979) – Distinguished University Professor and Richard E. Prange Chair in Physics, University of Maryland, College Park
- Tejal A. Desai (Sc.B. 1994) – bioengineer and therapeutic nanotechnologist; Sorensen Family Dean of Engineering, Brown University School of Engineering
- Michael H. Dickinson (Sc.B. 1984) – Zarem Professor of Bioengineering and Biology, California Institute of Technology; recipient of the MacArthur Fellowship
- Gül Dölen (M.D.) – Renee and Bob Parsons Endowed Chair in the Department of Psychology and Helen Wills Neuroscience Institute, UC Berkeley
- Neil Donahue (B.Sc. 1985) – atmospheric chemist; Thomas Lord Professor of Chemical Engineering, Carnegie Mellon University
- John Donoghue (Ph.D. 1979) – H.M. Wriston Professor of Neuroscience and Engineering, Brown University
- Suzanne Eaton (Sc.B. 1981) – professor of Molecular Biology, Max Planck Institute of Molecular Cell Biology and Genetics
- Bethany Ehlmann (M.S. 2008, Ph.D. 2010) – president of The Planetary Society; professor of Planetary Science, California Institute of Technology; Rhodes Scholar
- Anne Fausto-Sterling (Ph.D. 1970) – major contributor to sexology and biology of gender; Nancy Duke Lewis Professor of Biology and Gender Studies, Brown University

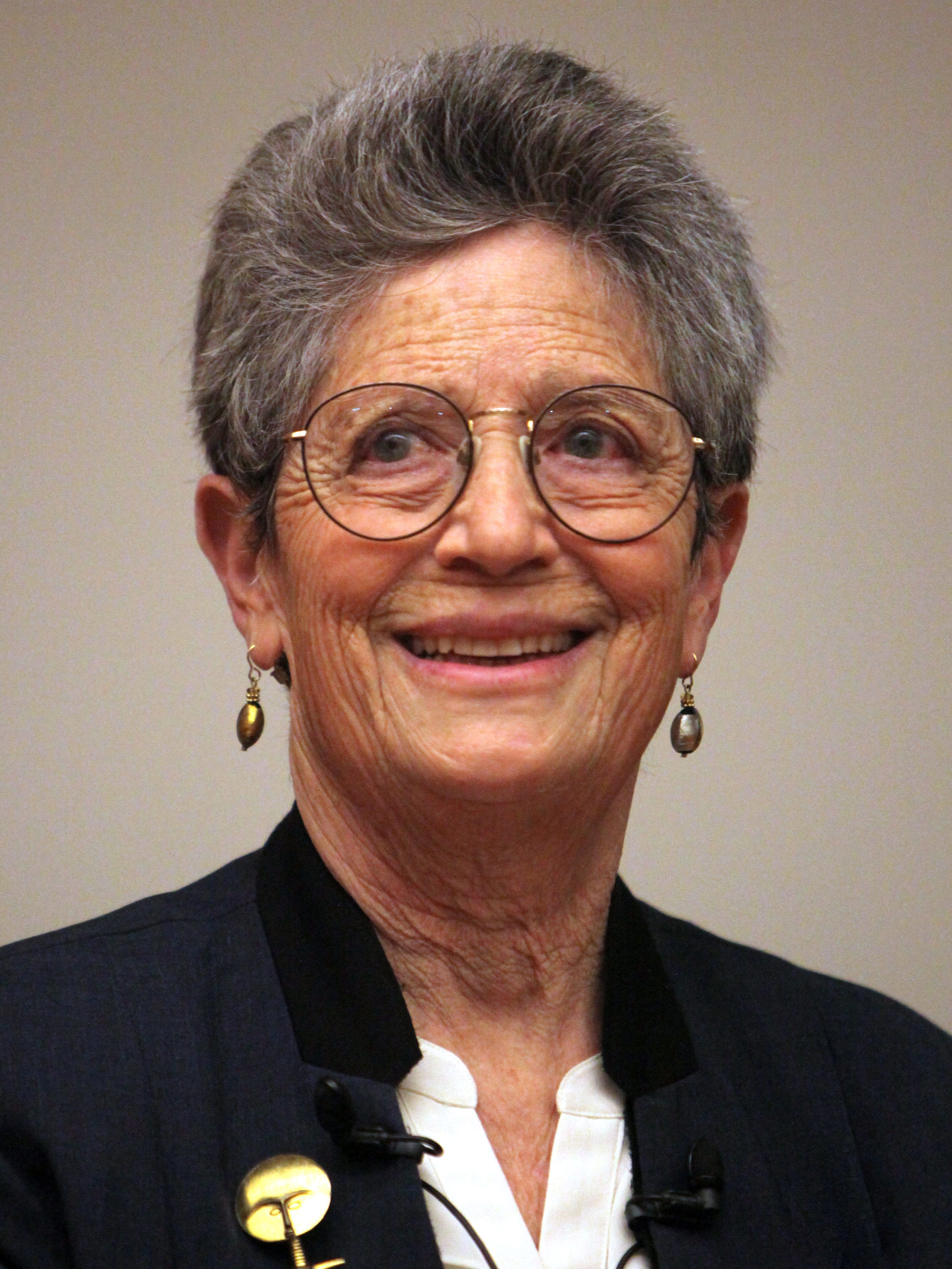
Anne Fausto-Sterling (1970)

- W. Tecumseh Fitch (A.B. 1986, Ph.D. 1994) – Professor of Cognitive Biology, University of Vienna
- Raymond Fuoss (Ph.D. 1932) – Sterling Professor Chair of Chemistry, Yale University
- Paul Garabedian (A.B. 1946) – director of the Division of Computational Fluid Dynamics, Courant Institute of Mathematical Sciences, New York University
- Margaret Gardel (Sc.B. 1998) – Horace B. Horton Professor of Physics, University of Chicago
- Martha Gilmore (Ph.D. 1998) – George I. Seney Professor of Geology and director of Graduate Studies, Wesleyan University
- Miriam B. Goodman (B.Sc. 1986) – Mrs. George A. Winzer Professor of Cell Biology, Stanford University; chair, Stanford Neuroscience Institute
- Andrew V. Granato (Ph.D. 1955) – professor emeritus of Physics, University of Illinois at Urbana–Champaign
- David Grinspoon (A.B., Sc.B.) – astrobiologist; senior scientist, Planetary Science Institute
- Alan Grossman (Sc.B. 1979) – Praecis Professor of Biology and Department Head of Biology, MIT
- James W. Head (Ph.D. 1969) – Louis and Elizabeth Scherck Distinguished Professor Emeritus of the Geological Sciences, Brown University
- Arthur Hoag (A.B. 1942) – astronomer; discoverer of Hoag's Object
- Michael R. Hoffmann (Ph.D. 1973) – John S. and Sherry Chen Professor of Environmental Science, Caltech
- Albrecht Hofmann (Ph.D. 1969) – director emeritus, Max Planck Institute for Chemistry, ForMemRS
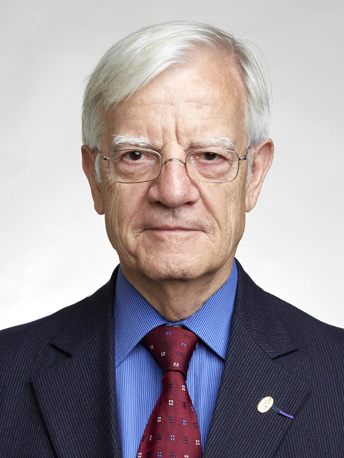
  Albrecht Hofmann (1969)
- John Edwards Holbrook (A.B. 1815) – zoologist, herpetologist, and naturalist
- Donald C. Hood (Ph.D. 1969) – James F. Bender Professor in Psychology and Professor of Ophthalmic Science, Columbia University
- Arthur L. Horwich (A.B. 1972, M.D. 1975) – Sterling Professor of Genetics and Professor of Pediatrics, Yale School of Medicine; winner of the Lasker Award, Albany Medical Center Prize, Shaw Prize, and Breakthrough Prize; discoverer of the functions and mechanisms of chaperone-mediated protein folding
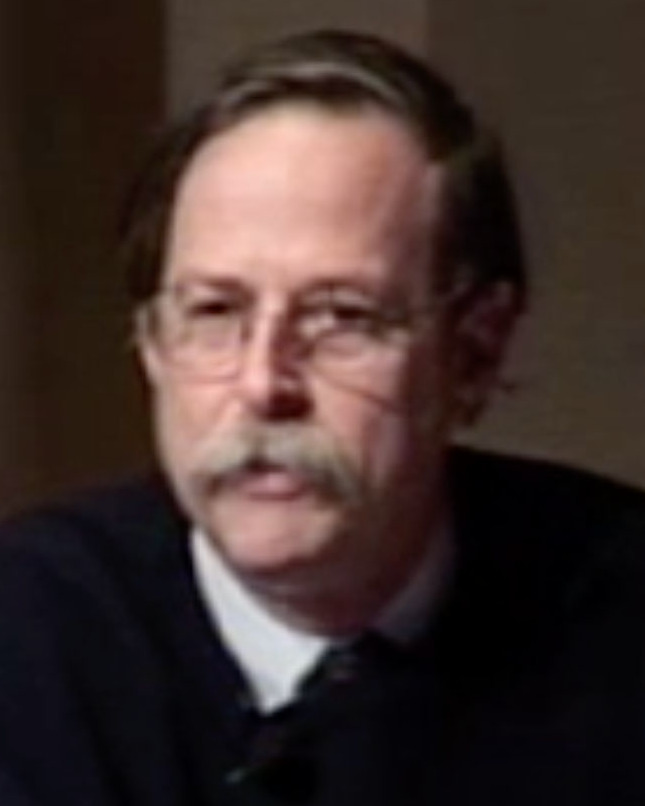
  Arthur L. Horwich (1972, 1975)
- Richard Ivry (A.B. 1981) – Distinguished Professor in the Department of Psychology, UC Berkeley
- Bor-ming Jahn (M.Sc. 1967) – Distinguished Chair Emeritus in Geosciences, National Taiwan University
- Lucy Jones (A.B. 1976) – seismologist
- Richard Kaner (A.B. 1980) – Dr. Myung Ki Hong Endowed Chair in Materials Innovation, UCLA
- Suzanne Mahlburg Kay (Ph.D. 1975) – William & Katherine Snee Professor of Geological Sciences Emeritus, Cornell University
- Brian Keating (M.Sc. 1995, Ph.D. 2000) – Chancellor's Distinguished Professor of Physics, UC San Diego
- Frederick G. Keyes (Sc.B. 1906, Sc.M. 1907, Ph.D. 1909) – Professor of Physics and Chemistry, MIT
- Kim Sung-hoon (Ph.D. 1991) – Distinguished University Professor and director Medicinal Bioconvergence Research Center, Seoul National University
- Steven Kliewer (B.Sc. 1985) – Diana K. and Richard C. Strauss Distinguished Chair in Developmental Biology, University of Texas Southwestern Medical Center
- Philip Kocienski (Ph.D. 1971) – professor emeritus of Organic Chemistry, University of Leeds
- Clifford Kubiak (Sc.B 1975) – Distinguished Professor and Harold C. Urey Chair in Chemistry, UC San Diego
- Krishna Kumar (Ph.D.1996) – Robinson Professor in Chemistry, Tufts University
- Ka Yee Christina Lee (Sc.B. 1986) – 14th provost (2020–23) and David Lee Shillinglaw Distinguished Service Professor of Chemistry, University of Chicago
- Wen-Hsiung Li (Ph.D. 1972) – James Watson Professor of Ecology and Evolution, University of Chicago
- Robert Bruce Lindsay (A.B., Sc.M. 1920) – chair of the Physics Department and dean of the Graduate School, Brown University; recipient of the ASA Gold Medal
- Lorraine Lisiecki (Sc.M. 2003, Ph.D. 2005) – Professor in the Department of Earth Sciences, UC Santa Barbara
- David Lobell (Sc.B. 2000) – Gloria and Richard Kushel Director at the Center on Food Security and the Environment and Professor in the Department of Earth System Science, Stanford University; recipient of a MacArthur Fellowship
- Marcus Ward Lyon Jr. (Ph.B. 1897) – president, American Society of Mammalogists
- Robert H. MacArthur (A.M. 1953) – founding figure in evolutionary ecology; professor, University of Pennsylvania and Princeton University
- Roberta Marinelli (A.B. 1982) – professor in the College of Earth, Ocean and Atmospheric Sciences, Oregon State University
- Nick McCave (Ph.D. 1967) – Woodwardian Professor of Geology, Department of Earth Sciences, University of Cambridge; fellow, St John's College, Cambridge
- Amy McCune (A.B. 1976) – professor of Ecology and Evolutionary Biology, Cornell University
- Warren Meck (Ph.D. 1982) – professor of Psychology and Neuroscience, Duke University
- Kenneth R. Miller (Sc.B. 1970) – professor of Biology, Brown University

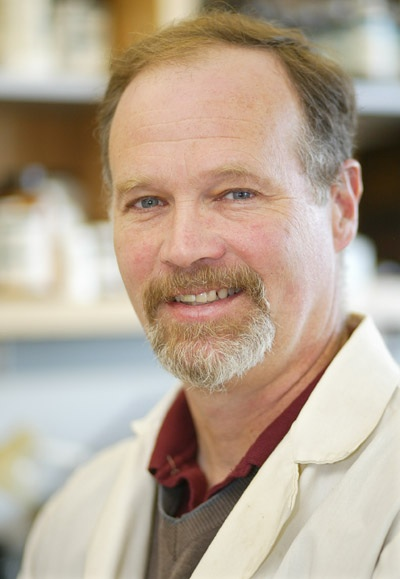
Kenneth R. Miller (1970)

- David Moore (A.B. 1974) – professor and chair of Nutritional Sciences and Toxicology, University of California, Berkeley; discoverer of constitutive androstane receptor, farnesoid X receptor, and small heterodimer partner
- Sharon Mosher (Sc.M. 1975) – William Stamps Farish Chair, University of Texas at Austin
- Cynthia F. Moss (Ph.D. 1986) – professor of Psychological and Brain Sciences, Johns Hopkins University
- John F. Mustard (M.Sc. 1986, Ph.D. 1990) – professor of Earth, Environmental, and Planetary Sciences, Brown University
- Myung Kyungjae (Ph.D. 1999) – biologist, Distinguished Professor, Ulsan National Institute of Science and Technology
- Samuel M. Nabrit (Ph.D. 1932) – first African-American to receive doctorate degree from Brown University; first African-American trustee at Brown University; first African-American appointed to the U.S. Atomic Energy Commission; second president of Texas Southern University
- Winthrop John Van Leuven Osterhout (A.M. 1894) – head of the Division of General Physiology, Rockefeller University; professor of Biology, Harvard University
- Jonathan Overpeck (Sc.M. 1981, Ph.D. 1985) – Samuel A. Graham Dean; William B. Stapp Collegiate Professor of Environmental Education; professor, Climate and Space Sciences and Engineering; professor, Earth and Environmental Sciences, School for Environment and Sustainability, University of Michigan
- Liam Paninski (Sc.B. 1999) – professor in the Departments of Statistics and Neuroscience, Columbia University
- Michael Paradiso (Ph.D. 1984) – Sidney A. Fox and Dorothea Doctors Fox Professor of Ophthalmology and Visual Science and professor of Neuroscience, Brown University
- Robert L. Park (Ph.D. 1964) – professor emeritus of Physics, University of Maryland, College Park; former director of Public Information at the American Physical Society
- Robert Parr (A.B. 1942) – professor emeritus of Chemistry, UNC Chapel Hill; co-founder of quantum chemistry
- Dragana Popović (Sc.M. 1985, Ph.D. 1989) – research professor in the Department of Physics, Florida State University
- Ainissa Ramirez (Sc.B. 1990) – material scientist and science communicator
- Maureen Raymo (Sc.B 1982) – paleoclimatologist; Bruce C. Heezen/Lamont Research Professor and director of the Lamont-Doherty Core Repository, Lamont–Doherty Earth Observatory; Co-Founding Dean, Columbia Climate School
- Collin Roesler (Sc.B. 1985) – William R. Kenan Professor of Earth and Oceanographic Science, Bowdoin College
- Peter A. Rona (1956) – professor of Earth and Planetary Sciences, Rutgers University
- Rachel Rosen (Sc.B.) – associate professor of Theoretical Physics, Carnegie Mellon University
- Daniel Rothman (A.B. 1979) – professor of Geophysics, MIT
- Tatiana Rynearson (Sc.B. 1994) – professor of Oceanography, University of Rhode Island
- David M. Sabatini (Sc.B. 1990) – professor of Biology, MIT (2002–2021); Member, Whitehead Institute; Howard Hughes Medical Investigator; discoverer of mTOR

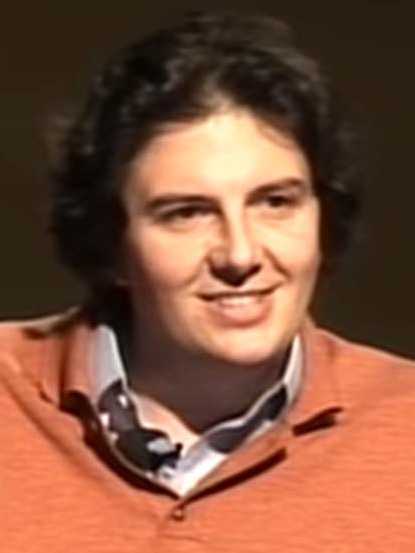
David M. Sabatini (1990)

- Ellery Schempp (Ph.D. 1967) – physicist, primary student involved in the landmark 1963 Supreme Court case, Abington School District v. Schempp
- Gabriela Schlau-Cohen (BSc 2003) – associate professor of Chemistry, MIT
- Stephanie Schorge (Ph.D. 1999) – professor of Neuroscience, University College London
- Michael Shadlen (A.B. 1981, M.D. 1988) – professor of Neuroscience, Columbia University, Howard Hughes Medical Institute Investigator
- Vijay Balakrishna Shenoy (Ph.D. 1998) – Professor of Physics, Indian Institute of Science
- Janine Shertzer (Sc.M. 1981, Ph.D. 1984) – Distinguished Professor of Science, College of the Holy Cross
- Barbara Shinn-Cunningham (Sc.B. 1986) – director, Carnegie Mellon Neuroscience Institute, George A. and Helen Dunham Cowan Professor, Carnegie Mellon University
- Brian R. Silliman (Ph.D. 2004) – Rachel Carson Distinguished Professor of Marine Conservation Biology, Nicholas School of the Environment, Duke University
- Steven H. Simon (Sc.B. 1989) – professor of Physics, University of Oxford
- Frederick Slocum (A.B. 1895, Ph.D. 1898) – professor of Astronomy, Wesleyan University
- Maud Slye (1899) – professor of Pathology, University of Chicago
- Daniel L. Stein (Sc.B. 1975) – professor of Physics and Mathematics, New York University
- Eliot Stellar (Sc.M. 1942) – University of Pennsylvania provost; one of the founders of behavioral neuroscience
- Harlan True Stetson (Sc.B. 1912
- Charles Arthur Stuart (Sc.B. 1919, Sc.M. 1921, Ph.D. 1923) – professor of Bacteriology, Brown University
- Shouheng Sun (Ph.D. 1996) – Vernon K. Krieble Professor of Chemistry and Professor of Engineering, Brown University
- Kyriakos Tamvakis (Ph.D. 1978) – professor of Physics, University of Ioannina
- Jesse Thaler (Sc.B. 2002) – professor of Physics, MIT; director, NSF AI Institute for Artificial Intelligence and Fundamental Interactions
- Jessica Tierney (A.B. 2005, M.Sc. 2008, Ph.D. 2010) – associate professor of Geosciences and Thomas R. Brown Distinguished Chair in Integrative Science, University of Arizona
- Evelyn Butler Tilden (A.B. 1913) – professor, Department of Microbiology, Northwestern University Dental School
- Jan Peter Toennies (Ph.D. 1957) – director emeritus, Max Planck Institute for Dynamics and Self-Organization; professor emeritus of Physics, University of Göttingen
- Margaret Tolbert (Ph.D. 1974) – professor of Chemistry and director of the Carver Research Foundation, Tuskegee University
- Stefanie Tompkins (M.Sc. 1993, Ph.D. 1997) – director, DARPA; former vice president of Research and Technology Transfer, Colorado School of Mines
- Mark Trodden (M.Sc., Ph.D. 1995) – Fay R. and Eugene L. Langberg Professor and Department Chair of Physics, Co-Director of the Penn Center for Particle Cosmology, University of Pennsylvania
- Herbert H. Uhlig (Sc.B. 1929) – professor of Metallurgy, MIT
- Fyodor Urnov (Ph.D. 1996) – professor of Genetics, Genomics, and Development, University of California, Berkeley
- Oriol Valls (Ph.D. 1976) – professor of Physics, University of Minnesota
- George Veronis (Ph.D. 1954) – Henry Barnard Davis Professor of Geophysics and Applied Science, Yale University
- William G. Vinal (Ph.D. 1922) – professor of Nature Education, Nature Guide School, University of Massachusetts Amherst
- F. Ann Walker (Ph.D. 1966) – Regents Professor in the Department of Chemistry, University of Arizona
- Herbert E. Walter (A.M. 1893) – professor of Biology, Brown University
- John S. Werner (Ph.D. 1979) – Distinguished Professor in the Departments of Ophthalmology and Vision Science and Neurobiology, Physiology, and Behavior, UC Davis
- Frank Perkins Whitman (1874) – professor of Physics, Western Reserve University
- Patricia Wiberg (A.B. 1976) – professor in the Department of Environmental Sciences, University of Virginia
- Inez Whipple Wilder (Ph.B. 1900) – professor and chair in the Department of Zoology, Smith College
- Michael E. Wysession (Sc.B. 1984) – professor of Earth and Planetary Sciences, Washington University in St. Louis
- Xi-Cheng Zhang (Ph.D. 1986) – Parker Givens Chair of Optics, University of Rochester; director of Institute of Optics
- Maria Zuber (Ph.D. 1986) – E. A. Griswold Professor of Geophysics and vice president of Research, MIT; NASA planning advisor; co-chair of the Council of Advisors on Science and Technology

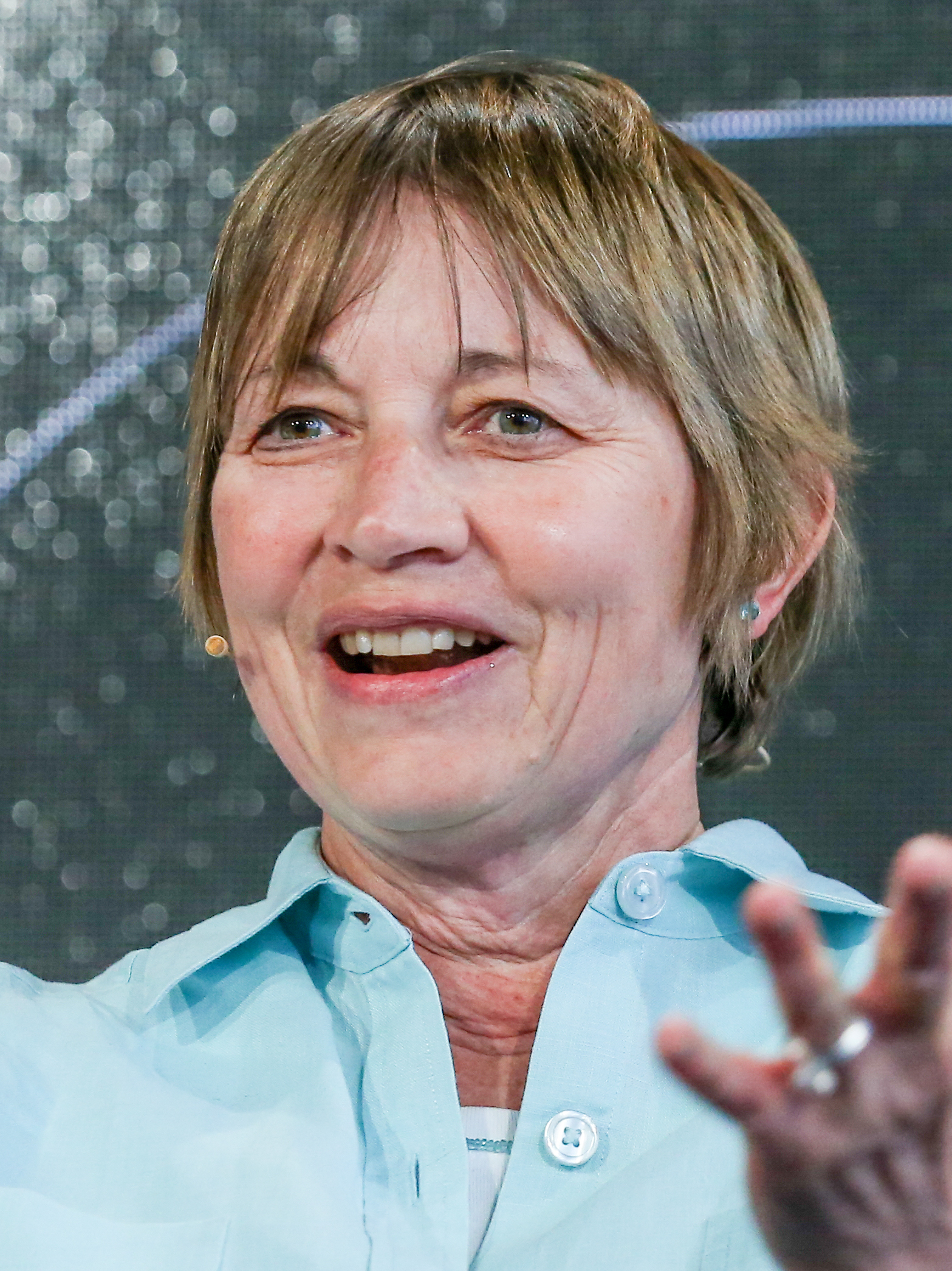
Maria Zuber (1986)

=== Social sciences ===
- Daniel R. Anderson (A.M. 1968, Ph.D. 1971) – professor emeritus of Psychology, University of Massachusetts Amherst
- Ryan S. Baker (Sc.B. 2000) – professor of Artificial Intelligence and Education, University of Pennsylvania Graduate School of Education; director, Penn Center for Learning Analytics
- Peter Bearman (A.B. 1978) – Jonathan R. Cole Professor of Sociology, Columbia University
- Mary Beaudry (A.M. 1975, Ph.D. 1980) – professor of Archaeology, Anthropology, and Gastronomy, Boston University
- J. Gayle Beck (A.B. 1979) – Lillian and Morrie Moss Chair of Excellence Emerita in the Department of Psychology, University of Memphis
- Aaron Belkin (A.B. 1988) – Professor of Political Science, San Francisco State University; authority on LGBT people in the United States Armed Forces
- Adia Benton (A.B. 1999) – cultural and medical anthropologist, Associate Professor of Anthropology at Northwestern University
- Bernard Bloch (Ph.D. 1935) – Professor of Linguistics, Yale University
- Kenneth A. Bollen (A.M. 1975, Ph.D. 1977) – Henry Rudolph Immerwahr Distinguished Professor in the Department of Psychology and Neuroscience, UNC Chapel Hill
- Jason Bordoff (A.B. 1994) – co-founding dean of the Columbia Climate School, founding director of the Center on Global Energy Policy, School of International and Public Affairs, Columbia University
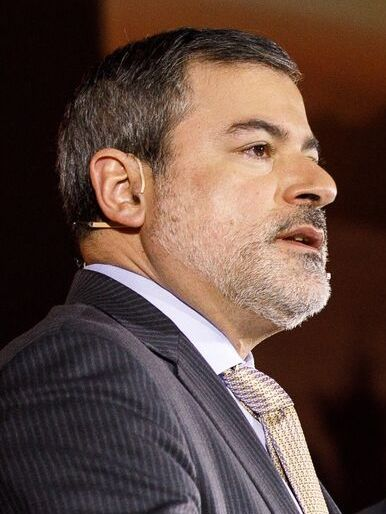
  Jason Bordoff (1994)
- Caroline Brettell (Ph.D. 1978) – Distinguished Professor of Anthropology and Ruth Collins Altshuler Professor, Southern Methodist University
- Selmer Bringsjord (Ph.D. 1987) – chair of the Department of Cognitive Science, Rensselaer Polytechnic Institute
- Karida Brown (Ph.D. 2016) – professor of Sociology, Emory University
- Jessica Calarco (A.B. 2006) – professor of Sociology, University of Wisconsin–Madison
- Melani Cammett (A.B. 1991) – Clarence Dillon Professor of International Affairs, Harvard University; director, Weatherhead Center for International Affairs; professor, Harvard T.H. Chan School of Public Health
- Prudence Carter (BSc 1991) – Sarah and Joseph Jr. Dowling Professor of Sociology, Brown University; Mary E. Pardee Professor and dean of the Graduate School of Education, UC Berkeley (2016–2021)
- Bruce Chorpita (A.B. 1989) – professor of Psychology, UCLA
- Albert T. Corbett (A.B. 1972) – associate research professor emeritus of Human–Computer Interaction, Carnegie Mellon University
- Elizabeth Cowper (Ph.D. 1976) – professor of Linguistics, University of Toronto
- Neta Crawford (A.B. 1985) – Montague Burton Professor of International Relations, Oxford University
- Rafaela Dancygier (A.B. 2000) – IBM Chair in International Studies, Princeton University
- Lee Drutman (A.B. 1999) – senior fellow, New America; Lecturer, Johns Hopkins University
- Carl Porter Duncan (A.M. 1944, Ph.D. 1947) – professor of Experimental Psychology, Northwestern University
- Robert E. Emery (A.B. 1974) – professor of Psychology, University of Virginia
- Emily Falk (Sc.B. 2004) – professor of Communication, Psychology, and Marketing, vice dean of the Annenberg School for Communication at the University of Pennsylvania
- Carol Fowler (A.B. 1971) – professor of Psychology, University of Connecticut
- William H. Frey (A.M. 1971, Ph.D. 1974) – senior fellow in the Metropolitan Policy Program, Brookings Institution
- Ester Fuchs (A.M. 1974) – professor of International and Public Affairs and Political Science, Columbia University SIPA
- Robert M. Gagné (Sc.M 1939, Ph.D. 1940) – educational psychologist; professor, Florida State University; author of Conditions of Learning
- John Ghazvinian (A.B. 1996) – executive director, Middle East Center, University of Pennsylvania
- John Wesley Gilbert (A.B. 1888, A.M. 1891) – first African-American to receive an A.M. from Brown, first African-American archaeologist
- Jill S. Grigsby (Sc.B. 1976, A.M. 1977) – professor of Sociology, Pomona College
- Kinch Hoekstra (A.B. 1987) – Chancellor's Professor of Political Science and Law and Affiliated Professor of Philosophy and Classics, UC Berkeley
- Tracey Holloway (Sc.B. 1995) – Jeff Rudd and Jeanne Bissell Professor of Energy Analysis and Policy, University of Wisconsin–Madison
- Carol Nagy Jacklin (Ph.D. 1972) – professor of Psychology, University of Southern California; dean, College of William & Mary
- Martha Sharp Joukowsky (A.B. 1958) – professor in the Center for Old World Archaeology and Art and the Department of Anthropology, Brown University
- Patricia Keating (A.M. 1976, Ph.D. 1980) – Distinguished Professor and Chair of the Department of Linguistics, UCLA
- Orit Kedar (A.M. 1998) – professor of Political Science, Hebrew University of Jerusalem
- David Kertzer (A.B. 1969) – Paul Dupee University Professor of Social Science, Brown University; Recipient of the 2015 Pulitzer Prize for Biography or Autobiography
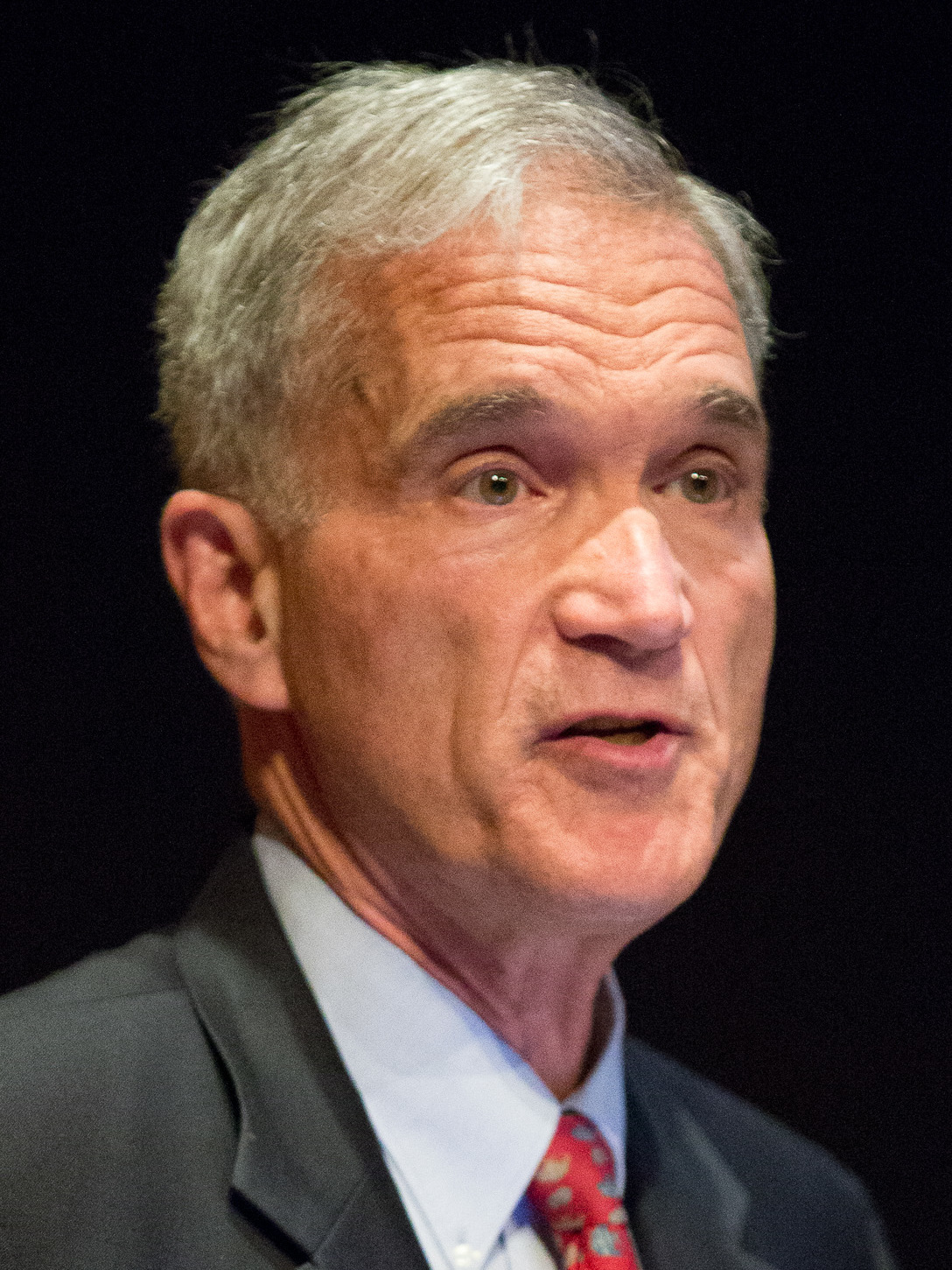
  David Kertzer (1969)
- Michael Kimmel (M.A. 1974) – Distinguished Professor of Sociology, Stony Brook University
- Eric Klinenberg (A.B. 1993) – professor of Sociology and Helen Gould Shepard Professor in Social Science, New York University
- Prema Kurien (A.M. 1989, Ph.D. 1993) – professor of Sociology, Syracuse University
- Robert Ladd (A.B 1968) – professor of Linguistics, University of Edinburgh
- Aditi Lahiri (Ph.D. 1982) – chair of Linguistics, University of Oxford
- Sarah Lamb (A.B. 1982) – professor of Anthropology and Women's, Gender and Sexuality Studies and Barbara Mandel Professor of Humanistic Social Sciences, Brandeis University
- Wallace Lambert (A.B. 1947) – psychologist of linguistics; "widely considered the father of the psychological study of bilingualism"
- Harold Leavitt (Sc.M. 1944) – pioneer in management psychology; Walter Kenneth Kilpatrick Professor of Organizational Behavior, Stanford University
- Jacob T. Levy (A.B. 1993) – Tomlinson Professor of Political Theory and Chair of the Department of Political Science, McGill University
- Ogden Lindsley (A.B. 1948, Sc.M. 1950) – developer of precision teaching; professor, University of Kansas
- Geoffrey Loftus (A.B. 1967) – professor emeritus of Psychology, University of Washington
- Julie Beth Lovins (A.B. 1968) – computational linguist who developed the first stemming algorithm for word matching
- Sabina Magliocco (A.B. 1980) – professor of Sociocultural Anthropology, University of British Columbia
- Tarek Masoud (A.B. 1997) – Ford Foundation Professor of Democracy and Governance, Harvard Kennedy School
- Leslie McCall (A.B. 1986) – Presidential Professor of Political Science and Sociology, Graduate Center, CUNY
- Louis C. Midgley (Ph.D. 1865) – Professor of Political Science, Brigham Young University
- Ruth Milkman (A.B. 1975) – Distinguished Professor of Sociology, Graduate Center, CUNY; former president, American Sociological Association
- Kevin V. Mulcahy (Ph.D. 1977) – Sheldon Beychok Distinguished Professor of Political Science, Louisiana State University
- Letitia Naigles (A.B. 1983) – professor of Psychological Sciences, University of Connecticut
- Richard P. Nathan (A.B. 1957) – director, Rockefeller Institute of Government; professor of Political Science and Public Policy, University at Albany, SUNY
- Melissa Nobles (A.B. 1985) – Ccancellor and professor of Political Science, MIT; Kenan Sahin Dean of the MIT School of Humanities, Arts, and Social Sciences (2015–2021)
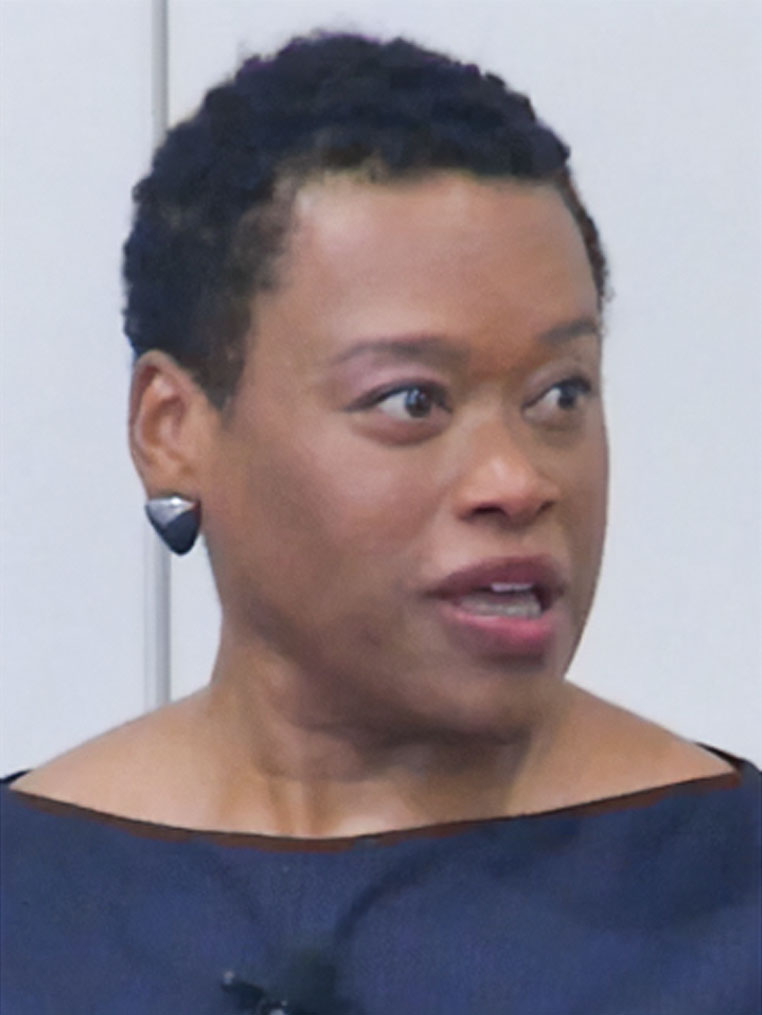
  Melissa Nobles (1985)
- Pedro Noguera (A.B. 1981, A.M. 1982) – Distinguished Professor of Education and Dean, USC Rossier School of Education
- Lloyd Ohlin (A.B. 1940) – sociologist and criminologist; professor emeritus, Harvard University, Columbia University, University of Chicago
- Jane L. Parpart (A.B. 1961) – Lester B. Pearson Chair of International Development Studies, Dalhousie University
- Hal Pashler (A.B. 1980) – Distinguished Professor of Psychology, UC San Diego
- Wendy Pearlman (A.B. 1996) – Jane Long Professor of Arts and Sciences and Professor of Political Science, Northwestern University
- Roger Penn (M.A. 1973) – Professor of sociology at the Queen's University Belfast
- Thomas Pepinsky (A.B. 2001) – Walter F. LaFeber Professor of Government, Cornell University
- Carl Pfaffmann (1933) – Vincent and Brooke Astor Professor of Physiological Psychology, Rockefeller University
- Nelson W. Polsby (A.M. 1957) – Heller Professor of Political Science, UC Berkeley, member, Council on Foreign Relations
- Imam Prasodjo (Ph.D. 1997) – professor in the Department of Social and Political Science, University of Indonesia
- Arthur S. Reber (M.A. 1965, Ph.D. 1967) – psychologist known for introducing the concept of implicit learning; Broeklundian Professor, Emeritus, Brooklyn College
- Mary E. Reuder (1945) – professor of Psychology, Queens College
- Jennifer Richeson (Sc.B. 1994) – Philip R. Allen Professor of Psychology, Yale University; Macarthur fellowship recipient

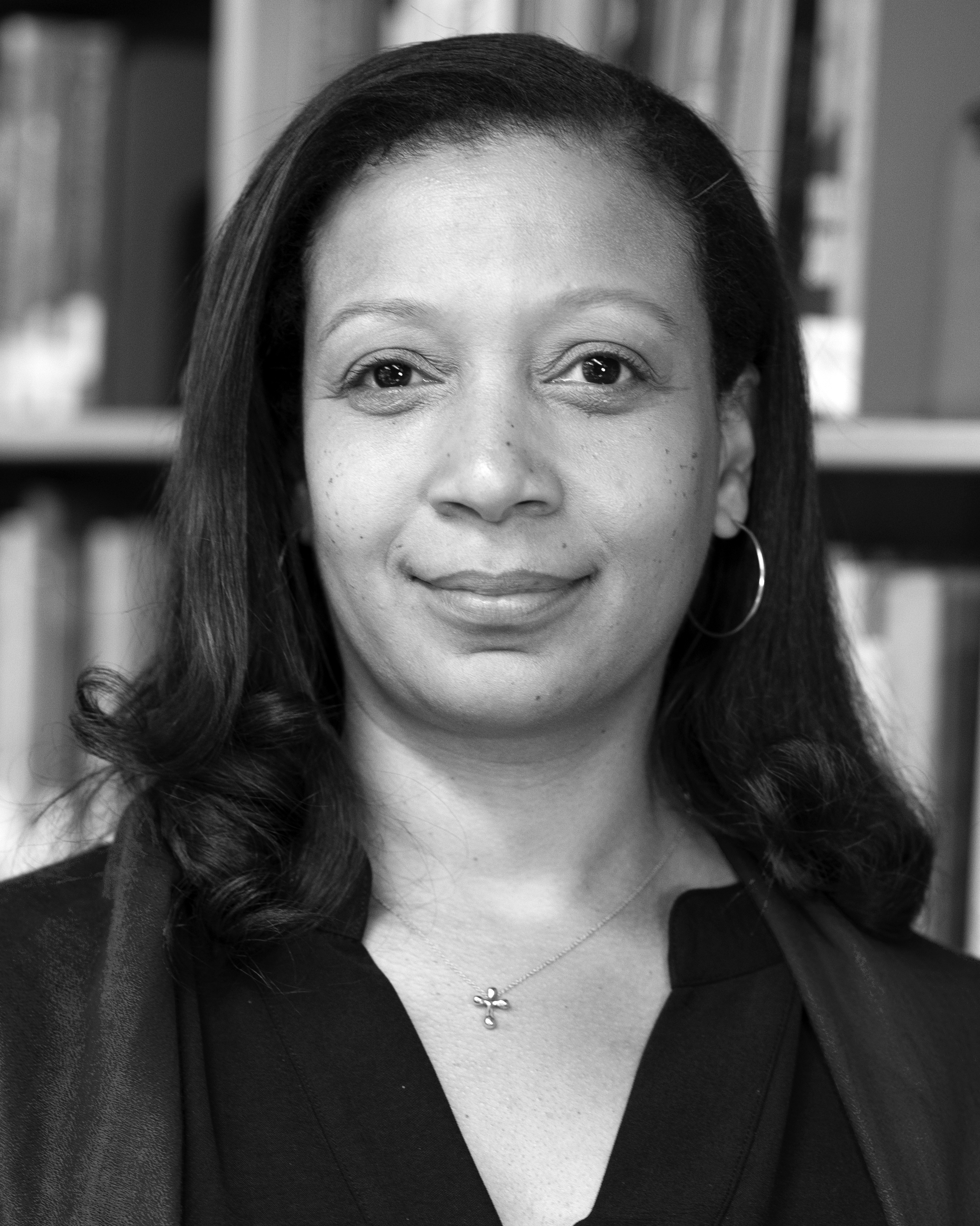
Jennifer Richeson (1994)

- Bruce Riedel (A.B. 1975) – senior fellow, Saban Center for Middle East Policy at the Brookings Institution; professor, Johns Hopkins SAIS
- Lisa Rofel (A.B. 1975) – professor emerita of Anthropology, UC Santa Cruz
- Daniel Rothenberg (A.B. 1987) – professor of Practice, School of Politics and Global Study; co-director, Center on the Future of War, Arizona State University
- Carolyn Rovee-Collier (M.Sc. 1964, Ph.D. 1966) – professor of Psychology, Rutgers University; pioneering developmental psychologist
- John Howland Rowe (A.B. 1939) – professor emeritus of Anthropology, UC Berkeley
- Jenny Saffran (A.B. 1991) – Vilas Distinguished Achievement Professor of Psychology, University of Wisconsin
- Eldar Shafir (A.B. 1984) – Class of 1987, professor of Behavioral Science and Public Policy and Professor of Psychology and Public Affairs, Princeton University

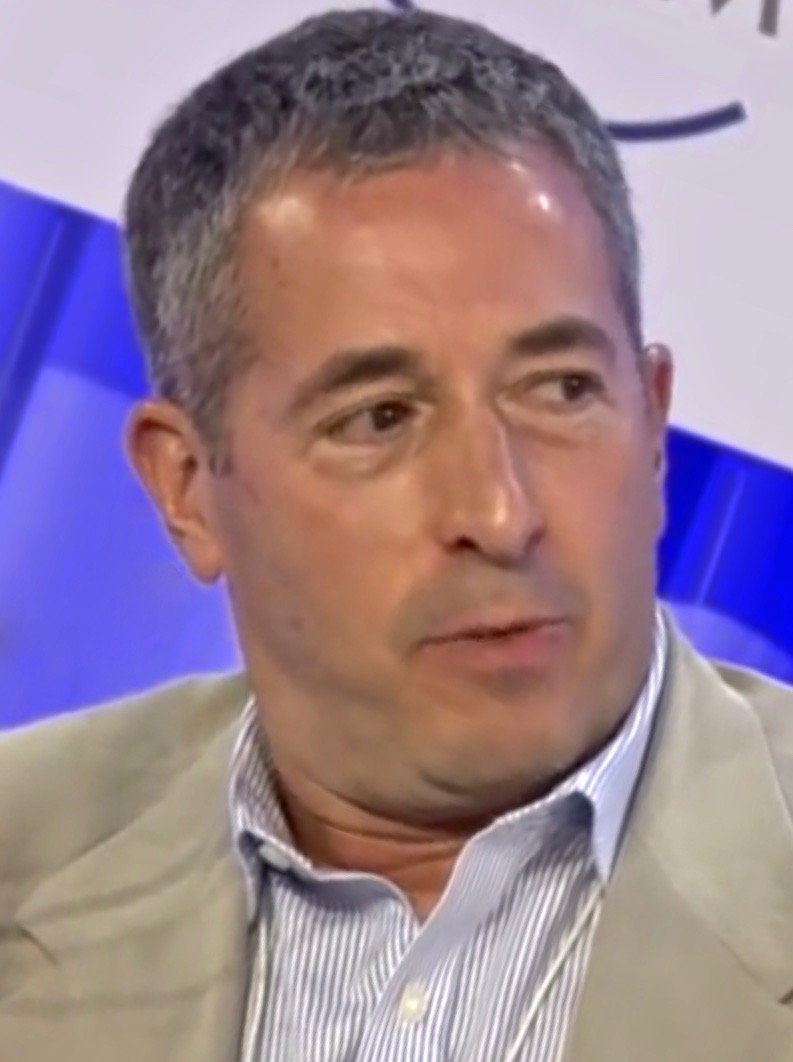
Eldar Shafir (1984)

- Patrick Sharkey (A.B. 2000) – William S. Tod Professor of Sociology and Public Affairs, Princeton University
- William Herbert Sheldon (A.B. 1919) – psychologist, creator of the field of somatotype and constitutional psychology
- Rachel Sherman (A.B. 1991) – professor and chair of Sociology, The New School for Social Research
- William Simmons (1960) – professor of Anthropology and provost, Brown University; acting director, Haffenreffer Museum of Anthropology
- Adam T. Smith (A.B. 1990) – Distinguished Professor of Arts and Sciences in Anthropology, Cornell University
- Richard Solomon (A.B. 1940, A.M. 1942, Ph.D. 1947) – experimental psychologist; author of the opponent-process theory of emotion; James M. Skinner University Professor of Science, University of Pennsylvania
- Erroll Southers (A.B. 1978) – professor of Practice in National and Homeland Security, director of the Safe Communities Institute, and director of Homegrown Violent Extremism Studies, USC Price School of Public Policy
- John R. Thelin (A.B. 1969) – University Research Professor on the History of Higher Education and Public Policy, University of Kentucky
- Deborah A. Thomas (A.B. 1988) – R. Jean Brownlee Professor of Anthropology and director of the Center for Experimental Ethnography, University of Pennsylvania
- Mark R. Thompson (A.B. 1982) – Chair Professor of Politics in the Department of Public and International Affairs, City University of Hong Kong
- Khachig Tölölyan (Ph.D. 1975) – founding figure in diaspora studies; professor emeritus of English and Letters, Wesleyan University
- Jeffrey K. Tulis (A.M. 1974) – professor emeritus of Government, The University of Texas at Austin
- Fred Turner (A.B. 1984) – Harry and Norman Chandler Professor of Communication, Stanford University
- Nicholas Valentino (A.B. 1990) – Donald R. Kinder Collegiate Professor of Political Science, University of Michigan and research professor at the Center for Political Studies, University of Michigan Institute for Social Research
- Guy Montrose Whipple (A.B. 1897) – professor of Experimental Education, University of Michigan
- Suzanne Wilson (A.B. 1973) – Neag Endowed Professor of Teacher Education, University of Connecticut
- Sam Wineburg (Class of 1980) – Margaret Jacks Professor Emeritus of Education, Stanford University
- Deborah J. Yashar (A.B. 1985) – Donald E. Stokes Professor of Public and International Affairs, Princeton University

=== Others ===
- Jamie Metzl (A.B. 1990) – futurist; senior fellow, Atlantic Council
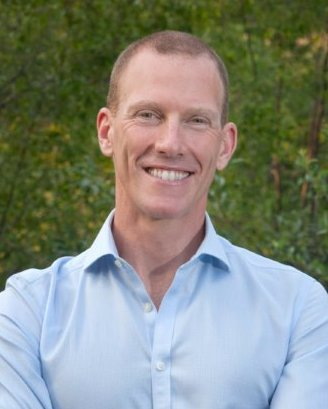
  Jamie Metzl (1990)
- Bina Venkataraman (A.B. 2002) – director of Global Policy Initiatives, Broad Institute
- Noah Wardrip-Fruin (Ph.D. 2006) – professor of Computational Media, University of California, Santa Cruz

== Science, technology and innovation ==
- Katherine L. Adams (A.B. 1986) – general counsel and senior vice president of Legal and Global Security, Apple Inc.
- Willis Adcock (Ph.D. 1948) – chemist, professor of electrical engineering, grew silicon boules for construction of the first silicon transistor at Texas Instruments
- Zachariah Allen (1813) – inventor of the steam engine automatic cut-off valve
- Seth Berkley (Sc.B. 1978, M.D. 1981) – CEO of GAVI, founder and former president and CEO of the International AIDS Vaccine Initiative

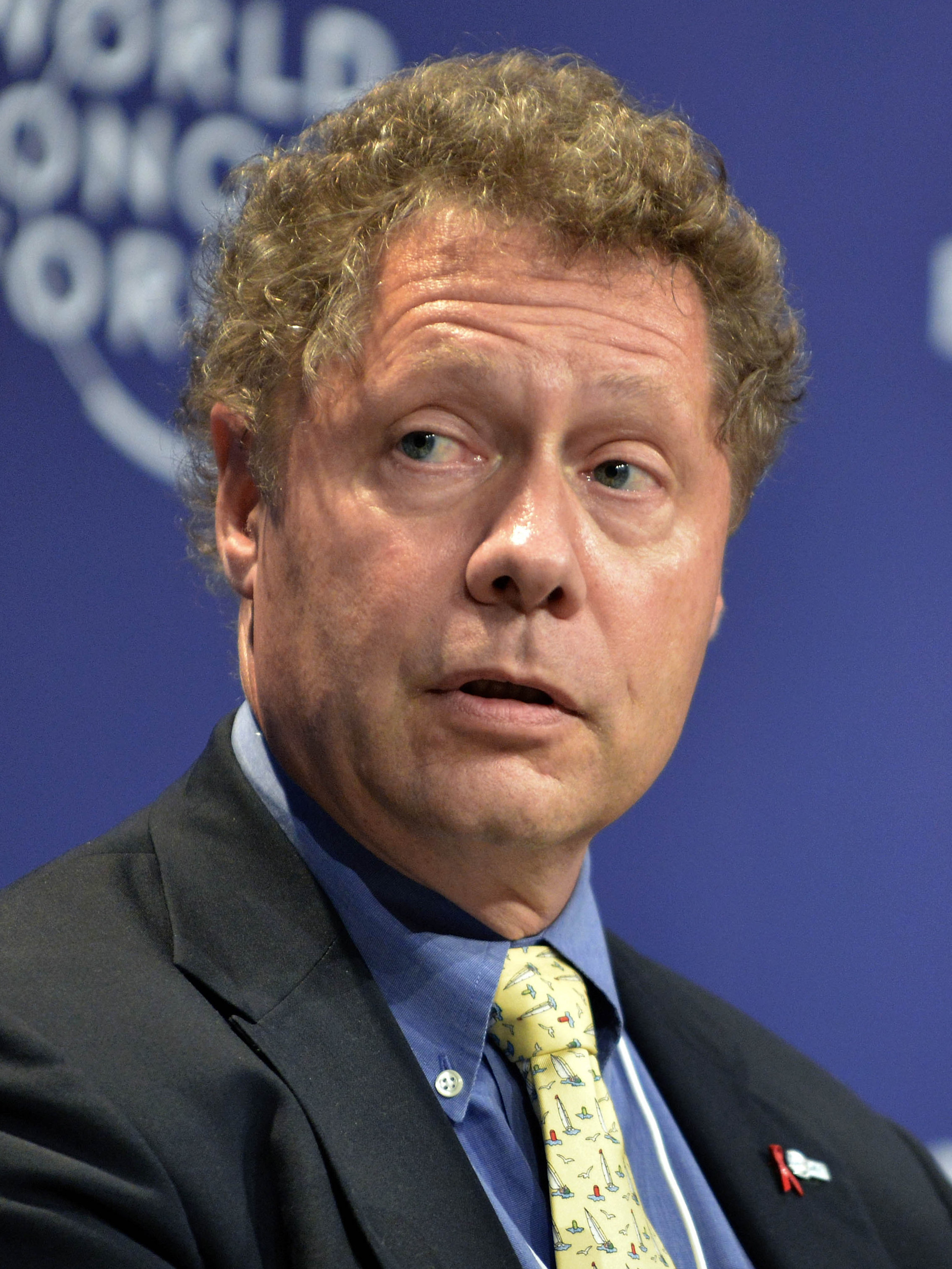
Seth Berkley (1978, 1981)

- John Seely Brown (A.B. 1962) – inventor of spellcheck
- Walter Guyton Cady (1895) – physicist and electrical engineer; developed the first quartz crystal oscillator
- Bryan Cantrill (BSc 1996) – one of the three authors of DTrace, CTO of Oxide Computer Company, former CTO of Joyent
- John H. Crawford (1975) – chief architect, Intel386 and Intel486 microprocessors; co-managed the development of the Pentium microprocessor; Intel Fellow, Enterprise Platforms Group
- John Cumbers (Ph.D. 2011) – British molecular biologist, founder of SynBioBeta
- Helen Wendler Deane (Ph.D. 1943) – histophysiologist
- Lisa Gelobter (1991) – developed visual programs such as Shockwave
- Lillian Moller Gilbreth (Ph.D. 1915) – one of the first working female engineers; arguably the first true industrial/organizational psychologist; mother of twelve children as described by the book Cheaper by the Dozen

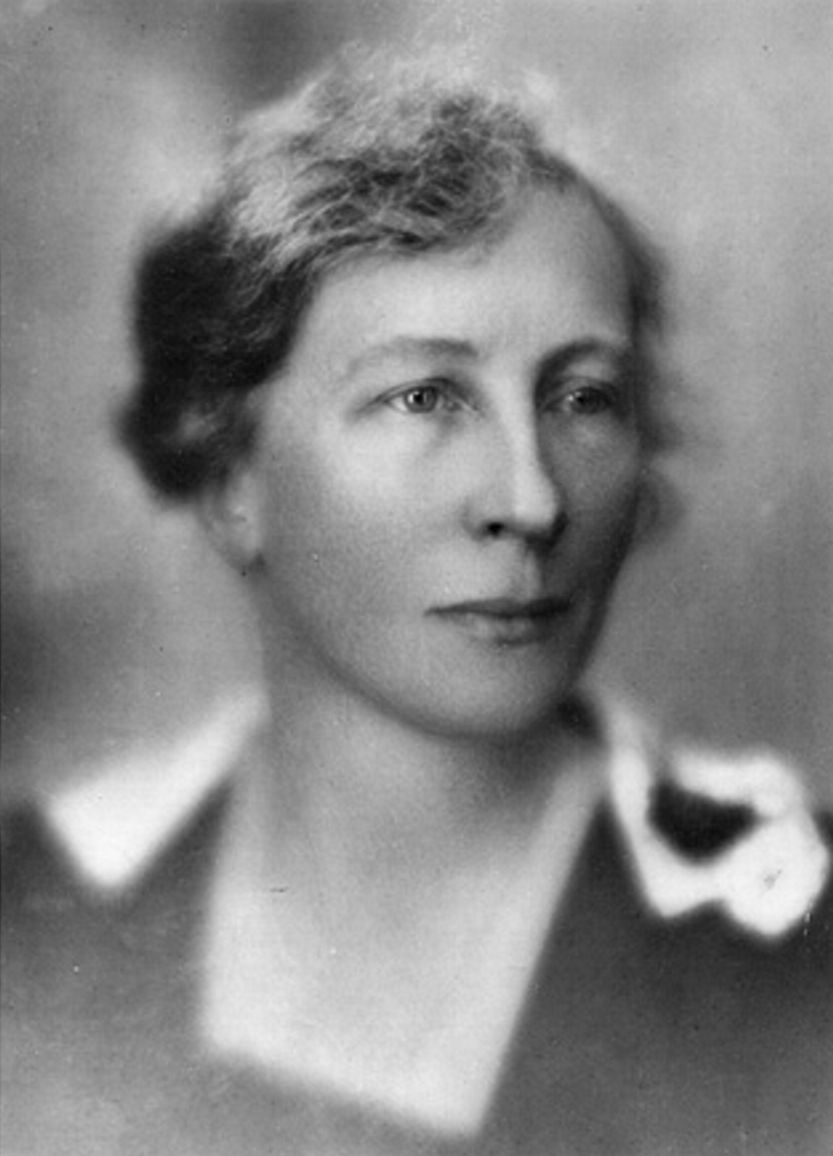
Lillian Moller Gilbreth (1915)

- Morton Gurtin (Ph.D. 1961) – Timoshenko Medal-winning mechanical engineer and mathematical physicist
- Andy Hertzfeld (Sc.B. 1975) – key member of original Apple Macintosh development team; one of the primary software architects of the classic Mac OS
- Alexander Lyman Holley (1853) – inventor, founding member of the American Society of Mechanical Engineers
- Eliot Horowitz (Sc.B. 2003) – co-founder and former CTO of MongoDB
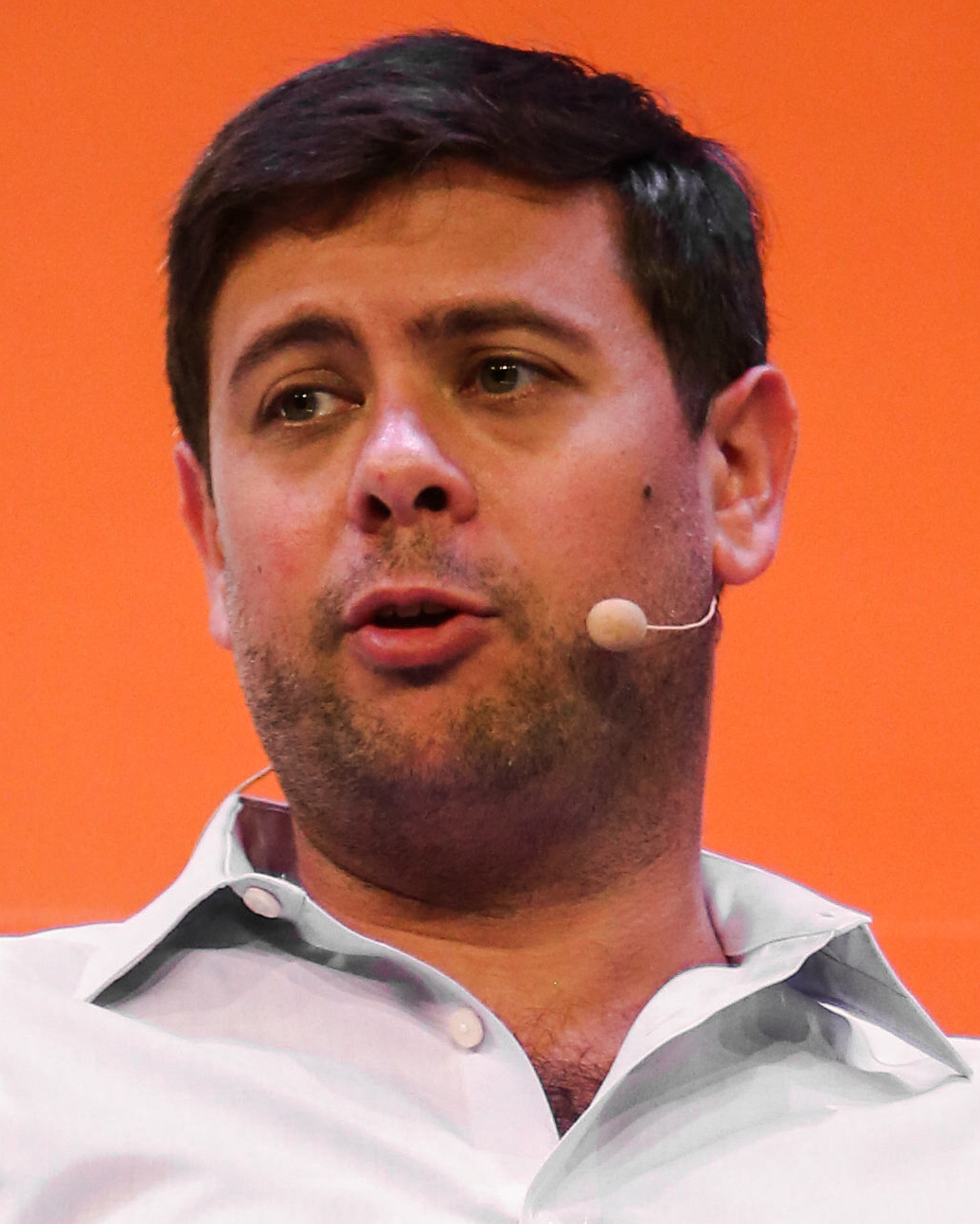
  Eliot Horowitz (2003)
- Mary Lou Jepsen (1987, Ph.D. 1997) – technology executive and inventor, co-founder of One Laptop per Child
- Chirinjeev Kathuria (BSc 1988, M.D. 1993) – co-founder and co-chairman of UpHealth Inc, co-founder of Ocean Biomedical
- Amy Leventer (Sc.B. 1979) – marine biologist, micropaleontologist, Antarctic researcher
- Adam Leventhal (Sc.B. 2001) – software engineer, one of the three authors of DTrace
- David J. Lipman (A.B.) – director, National Center for Biotechnology Information
- Hilary Mason – data scientist, former general manager of machine learning at Cloudera and chief scientist at Bitly
- Rebecca Moore (1977) – director, Google Earth
- Meredith Ringel Morris (Sc.B. 2001) – director and principal scientist, People + AI Research Team, Google Research
- Peter Norvig (Sc.B. 1978) – director of research, Google Inc.
- Erin Pettit (Sc.B. 1994) – glaciologist, Antarctic researcher
- David Shrier (Sc.B. 1995) – futurist and author
- Ken Silverman (Sc.B. 2000) – writer of the Build engine
- Marion Elizabeth Stark (A.B. 1916, A.M. 1979) – one of the first female American mathematics professors
- Gordon Kidd Teal (Ph.D. 1931) – inventor of the commercial silicon transistor
- John Tukey (Sc.B. 1936, Sc. M. 1937) – co-developed the Cooley–Tukey fast Fourier transform algorithm; coined the terms "bit", "byte", "software" and "cepstrum", recipient of National Medal of Science

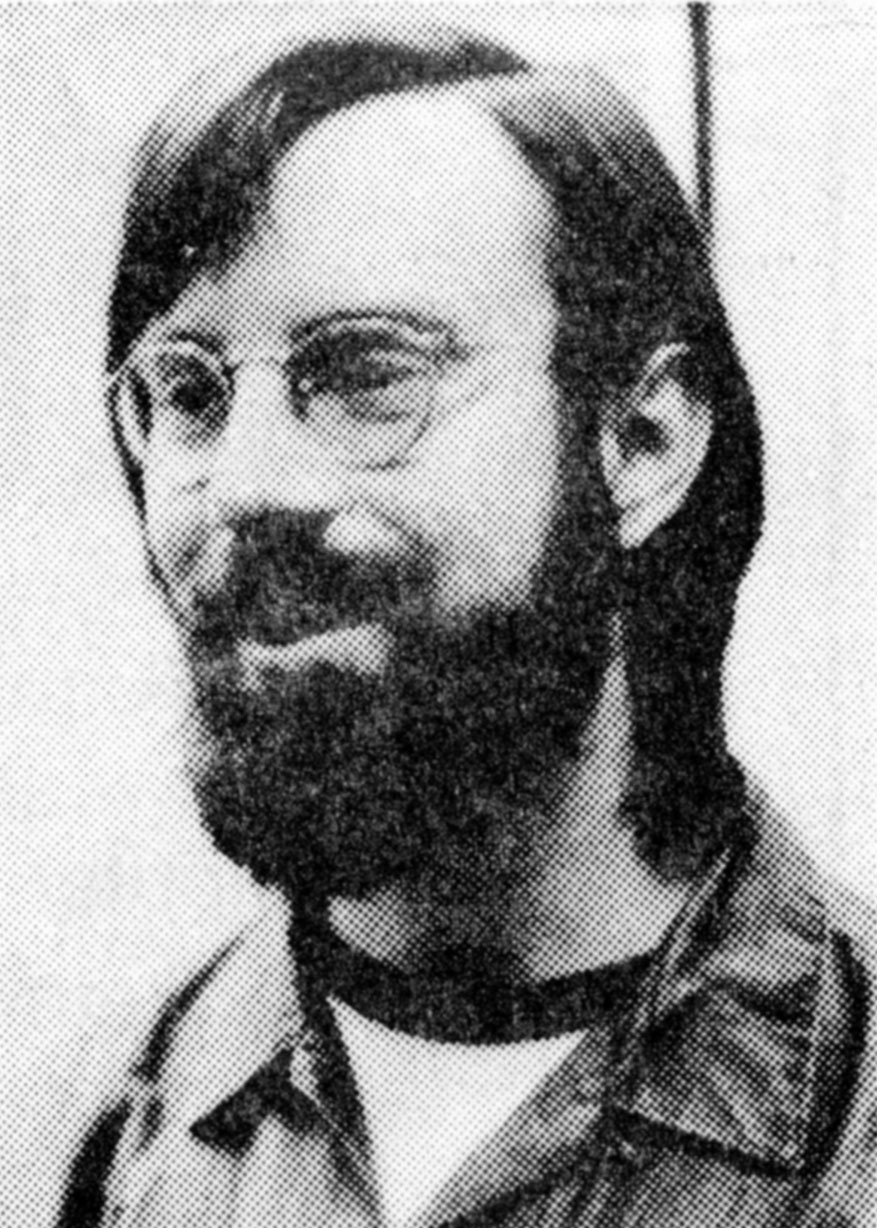
Bob Wallace (1971)

- Bob Wallace (Class of 1971) – ninth Microsoft employee, inventor of the term "shareware"

=== Space science and exploration ===
- Brian Binnie (Sc.B. 1975, Sc.M. 1976) – test pilot, privately funded experimental spaceplane SpaceShipOne
- James B. Garvin (Sc.B. 1978, Sc.M. 1981, Ph.D. 1984) – Chief Scientist, NASA Mars and lunar exploration programs
- David Grinspoon (Sc.B. 1982) – astrobiologist, senior scientist at the Planetary Science Institute
- Wesley Huntress (Sc.B. 1964) – president, The Planetary Society
- Byron K. Lichtenberg (Sc.B. 1969) – NASA astronaut
- Jessica Meir (A.B. 1999) – NASA astronaut; one of two women to participate in the first all-female spacewalk
- Sarah Milkovich (Sc.M. 2002, Ph.D. 2005) – lead of Science Operations for the Mars 2020 rover at the Jet Propulsion Laboratory

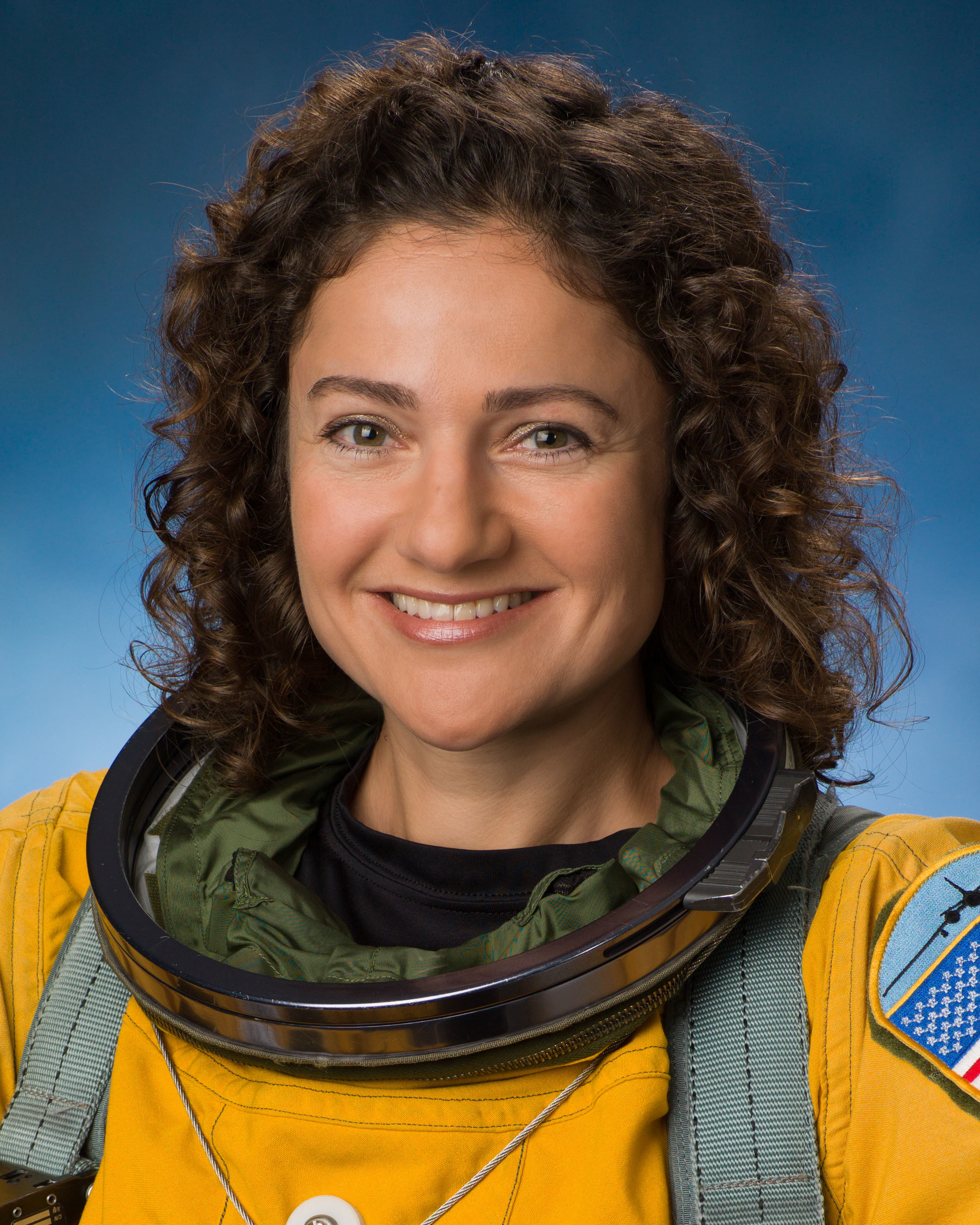
Jessica Meir (1999)

- Lynn J. Rothschild (Ph.D. 1985) – evolutionary biologist and astrobiologist at NASA's Ames Research Center Thomas O. Paine (A.B. 1942) – third administrator of NASA, oversaw first seven Apollo crewed missions

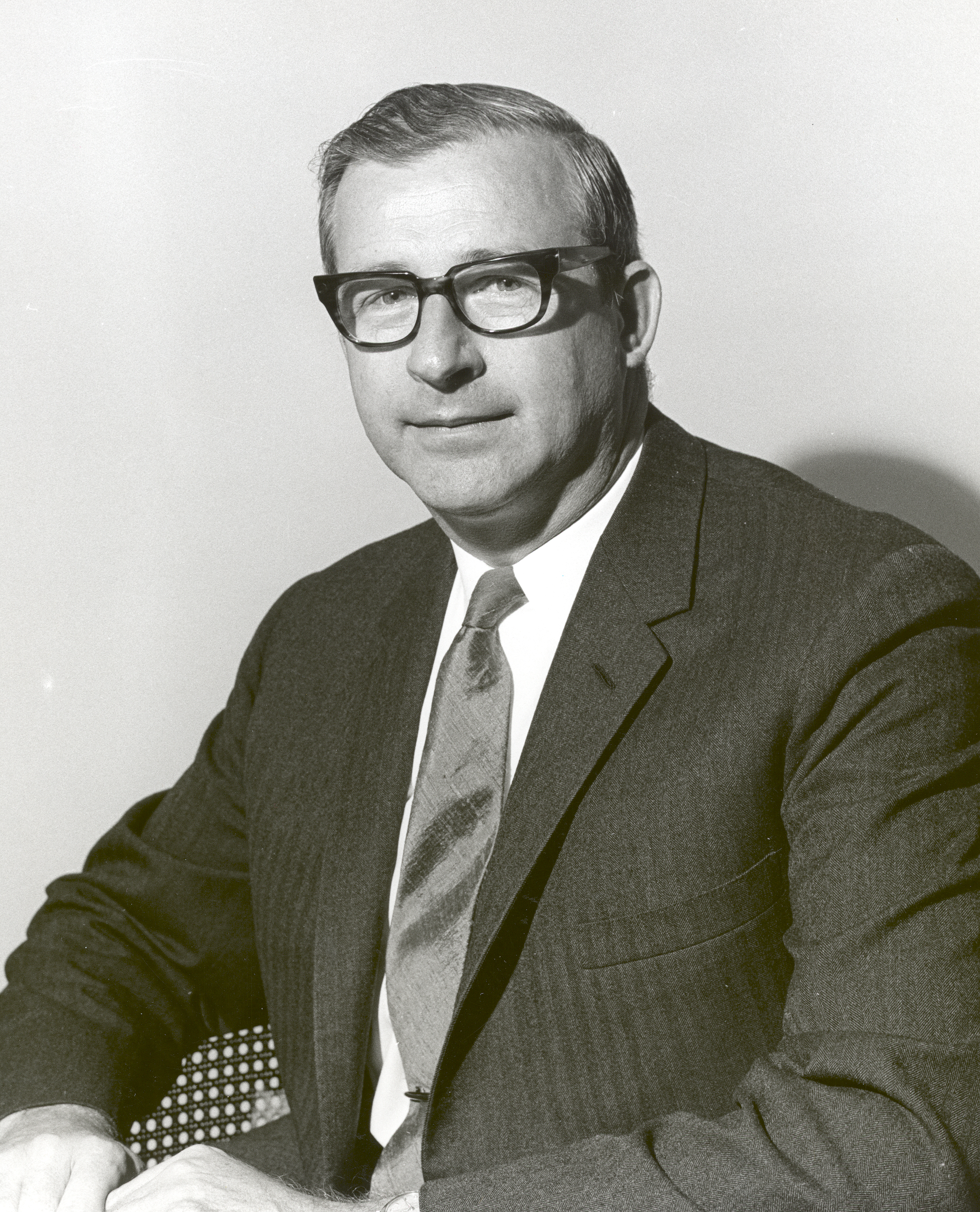
Thomas O. Paine (1942)

- Suzanne Smrekar (Sc.B. 1984) – deputy principal investigator for the Mars InSight lander
- Paul Spudis (Sc.M. 1977) – noted lunar scientist associated with the NASA Office of Space Science
- Ellen Stofan (Ph.D. 1989) – NASA chief scientist (2013–2016), John and Adrienne Mars Director, National Air and Space Museum
- Winslow Upton (Sc.B. 1875) – astronomer, director of Ladd Observatory
- George Wallerstein (Sc.B. 1951) – astronomer, winner of the Henry Norris Russell Lectureship
- Maria Zuber (Ph.D. 1986) – principal investigator of the Jet Propulsion Laboratory's Gravity Recovery and Interior Laboratory (GRAIL) mission

== Government, law and public policy ==
=== Governors ===
- Philip Allen (A.B. 1803) – 22nd governor of Rhode Island (1851–1853), U.S. senator, Rhode Island (1853–1859)
- Oliver Ames (1851–1853) – 35th governor of Massachusetts (1887–1890)
- Henry B. Anthony (A.B. 1833) – 21st governor of Rhode Island (1849–1851), U.S. senator, Rhode Island (1859–1884), president pro tempore of the U.S. Senate
- Augustus O. Bourn (1855) – 36th governor of Rhode Island (1883–1885)
- Donald Carcieri (A.B. 1965) – 73rd governor of Rhode Island (2003–2011)
- Norman S. Case (A.B. 1908) – 56th governor of Rhode Island (1928–1933)
- Lincoln Chafee (A.B. 1975) – 74th governor of Rhode Island (2011–2015), U.S. senator, Rhode Island

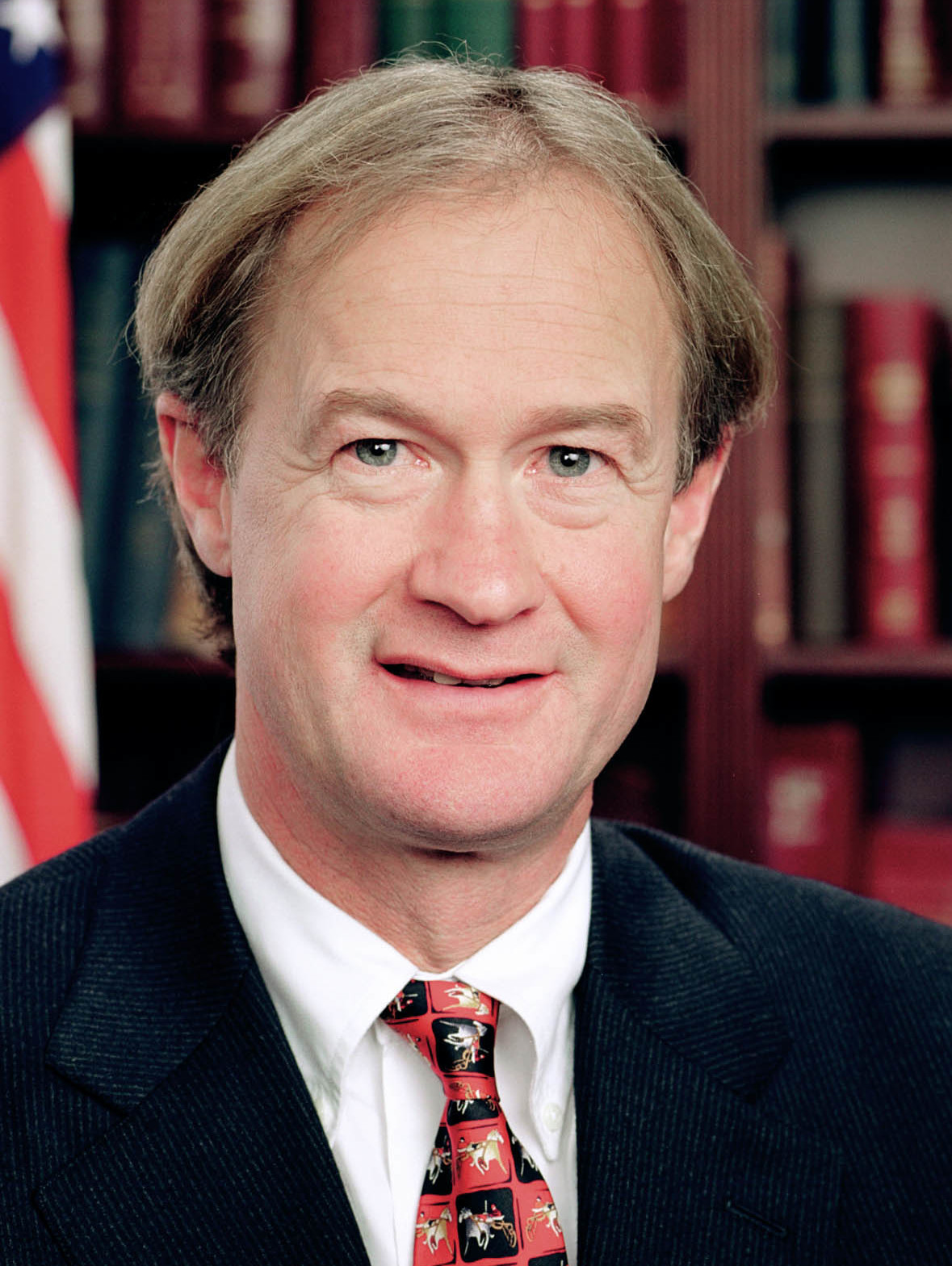
Lincoln Chafee (1975)

- William Claflin (Class of 1837) – 27th governor of Massachusetts (1869–1872)
- John H. Clifford (1827) – 21st governor of Massachusetts (1853–1854)
- Samuel Cony (1829) – 31st governor of Maine (1864–1867)
- Elisha Dyer (A.B. 1829) – 25th governor of Rhode Island (1857–1859)
- Elisha Dyer Jr. (1856) – 45th governor of Rhode Island (1897–1900)
- James Fenner (A.B. 1789) – 7th, 11th, and 17th governor of Rhode Island (1807–1811, 1824–1831, 1843–1845)
- John Brown Francis (A.B. 1808) – 13th governor of Rhode Island (1833–1838)
- William Gaston (1840) – 29th governor of Massachusetts (1875–1876)
- Theodore Francis Green (1887) – 57th governor of Rhode Island (1933–1936); U.S. senator, D–Rhode Island (1937–1961)
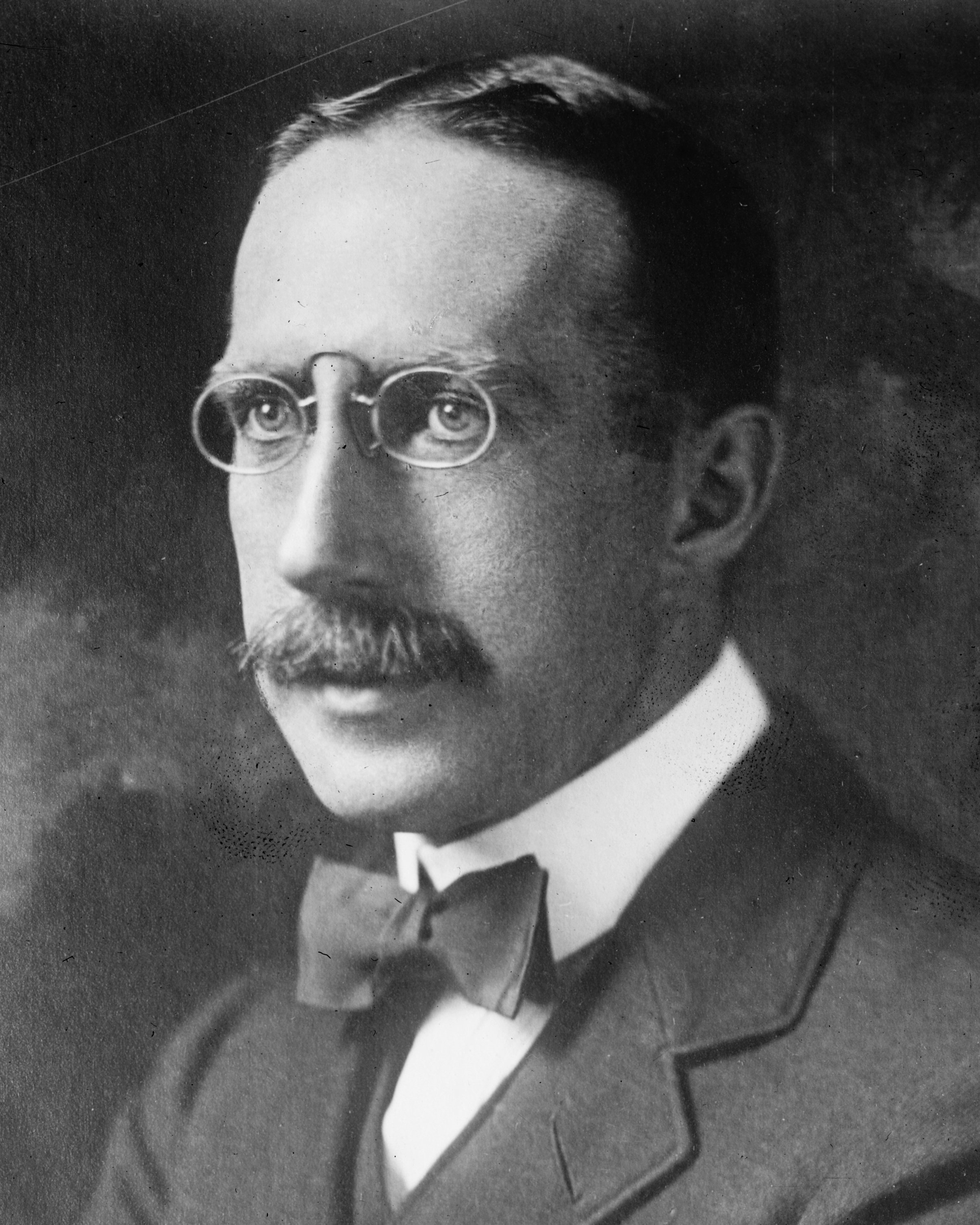
  T. F. Green (1887)
- Maggie Hassan (A.B. 1980) – 81st governor of New Hampshire (2013–2017); U.S. senator, D–New Hampshire (2017–)

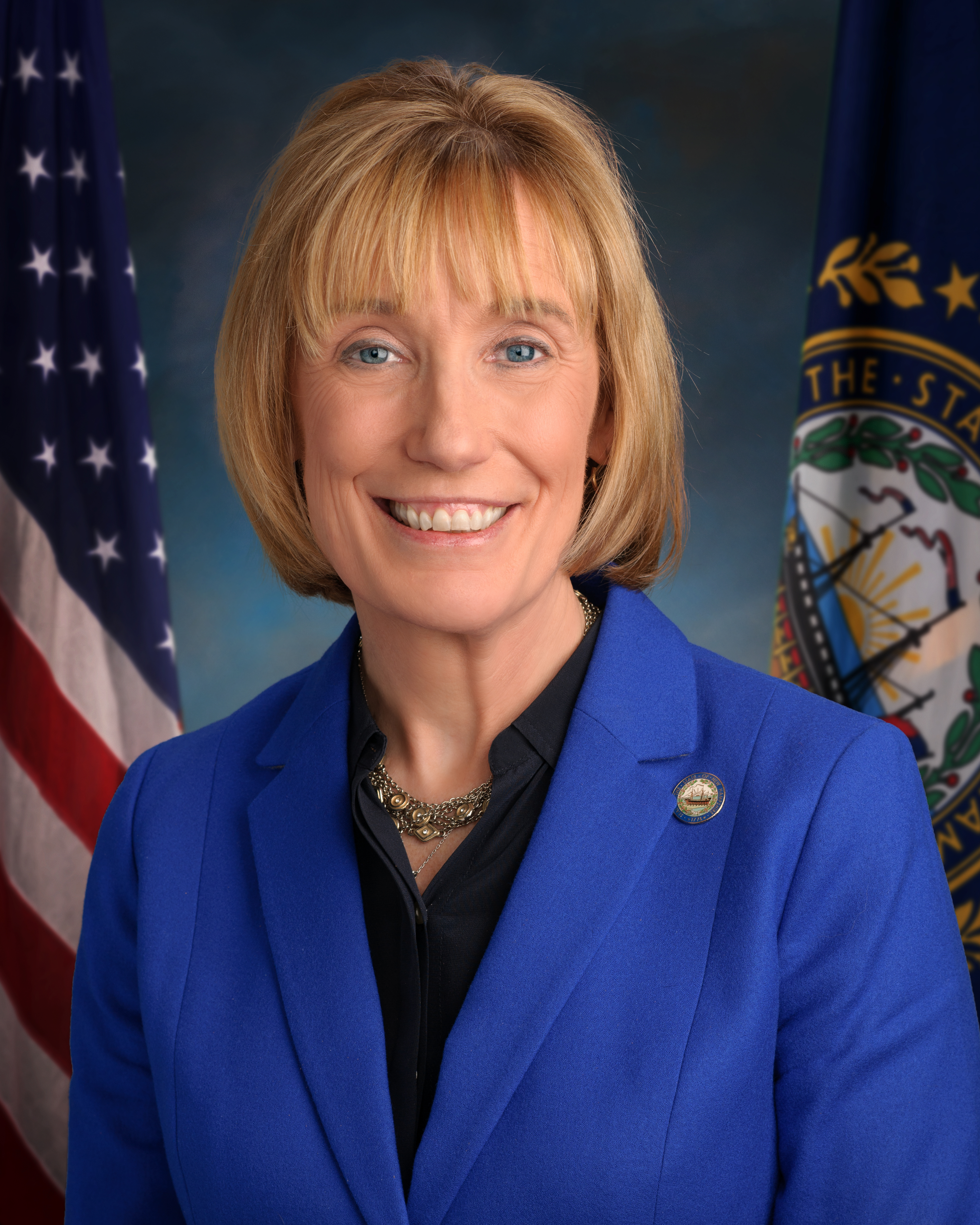
Maggie Hassan, class of 1980, U.S. senator of New Hampshire

- James H. Higgins (A.B. 1898) – 50th governor of Rhode Island (1907–1909)
- Charles Evans Hughes (A.B. 1881) – 36th governor of New York (1907–1910) and 1916 Republican presidential nominee
- Charles Jackson (A.B. 1917, A.M. 1920) – 18th governor of Rhode Island (1845–46)
- Piyush "Bobby" Jindal (Sc.B. 1992) – 55th governor of Louisiana (2008–2016)
- Otto Kerner Jr. (1930) – 33rd governor of Illinois (1961–1968)
- Samuel Ward King – 15th governor of Rhode Island (1839–1843)
- Frank Licht (A.B. 1938) – 67th governor of Rhode Island (1969–1973)
- William L. Marcy (A.B. 1808) – justice of New York State Supreme Court (1829); 11th governor of New York (1833–1839); U.S. secretary of war (1845–1849); U.S. senator from New York; U.S. secretary of state (1853–1857)
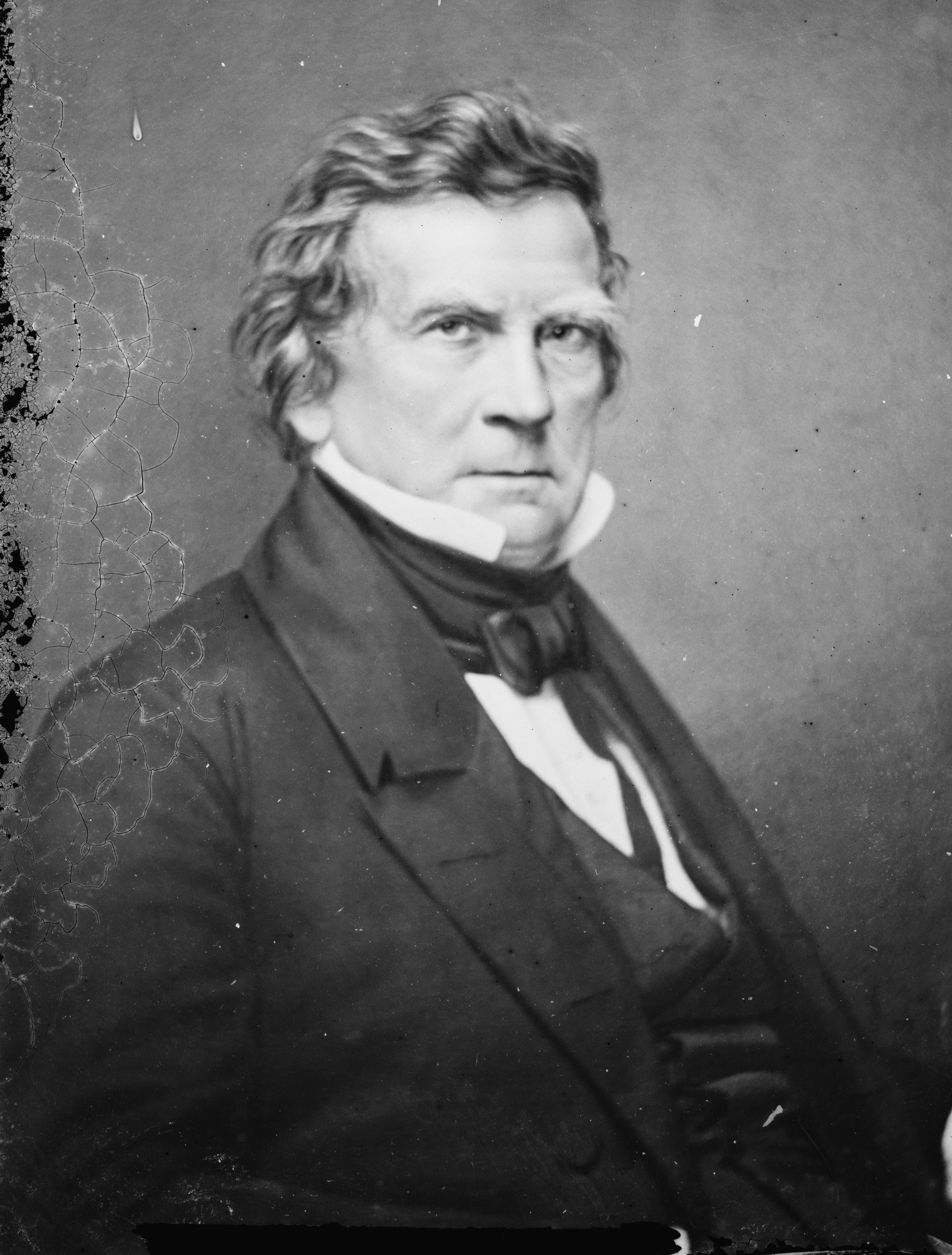
  William L. Marcy (1808)
- Jack Markell (1982) – 18th United States ambassador to the OECD, 73rd governor of Delaware (2009–2017)
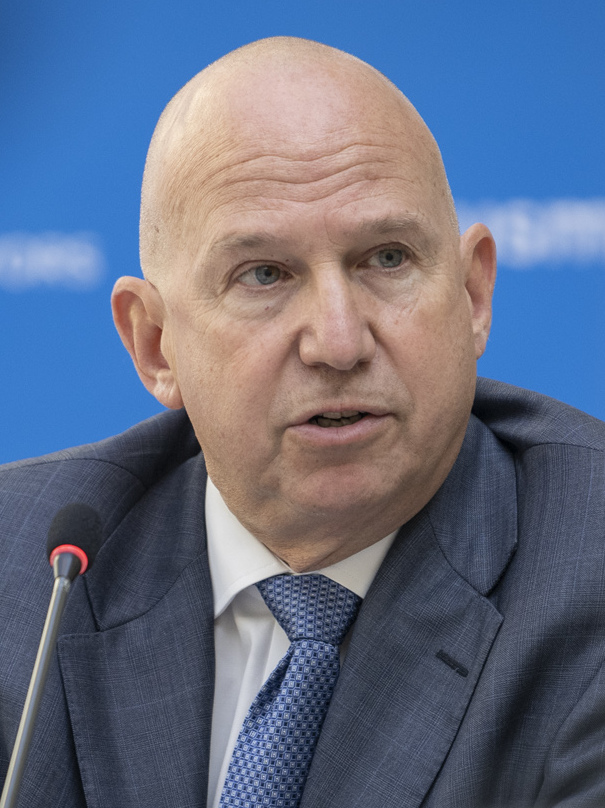
  Jack Markell (1982)
- Charles H. Mason (1850) – acting governor of the Washington Territory (1854–1859); 1st secretary of state of the Washington Territory
- Matt Meyer (A.B. 1994) – 76th governor of Delaware (2025-present)
- Marcus Morton (A.B. 1804, A.M 1807) – U.S. congressman, Massachusetts (1817–1821), 16th & 18th governor of Massachusetts (1825, 1840–1844)
- Pendleton Murrah (1848) – 10th governor of Texas (1863–1865)
- Philip W. Noel (1954) – 68th governor of Rhode Island (1973–1977)
- Robert E. Quinn (1915) – 58th governor of Rhode Island (1937–1939); judge, Rhode Island Superior Court
- Edward C. Stokes (1883) – 32nd governor of New Jersey (1905–1908)
- John Milton Thayer (1841) – 2nd governor of Wyoming Territory (1875–1878) and 6th governor of Nebraska (1887–1892)
- David Rogerson Williams (1792–1795) – 45th governor of South Carolina (1814–1816)
- Jared W. Williams (A.B. 1818) – 21st governor of New Hampshire (1847–1849)
- William D. Williamson (1804) – 2nd governor of Maine (1821–1821), U.S. congressman, Maine (1821–1823)

=== Legislators ===
==== United States senators ====
- Philip Allen (A.B. 1803) – U.S. senator, Rhode Island (1853–1859), governor of Rhode Island (1851–1853)
- Henry B. Anthony (A.B. 1833) – U.S. senator, Rhode Island (1859–1884), president pro tempore of the United States Senate (1875–1875), governor of Rhode Island (1849–1851)
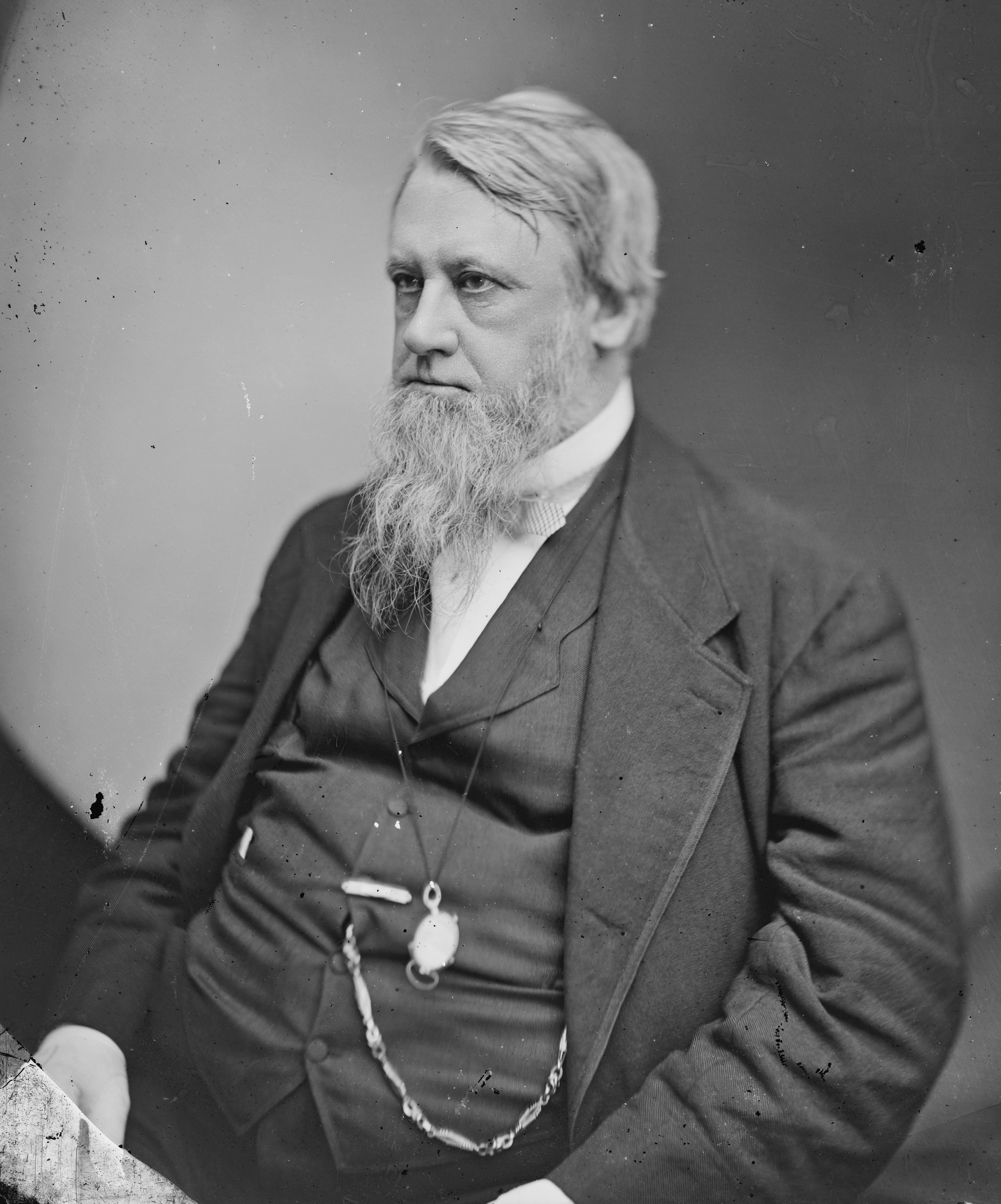
  Henry B. Anthony (1833)
- Samuel G. Arnold (A.B. 1841) – U.S. senator from Rhode Island
- James Burrill Jr. (A.B. 1788) – U.S. senator from Rhode Island
- Lincoln Chafee (A.B. 1975) – U.S. senator, Rhode Island (1999–2007); governor of Rhode Island (2011–2015)
- John Hopkins Clarke (A.B. 1809) – U.S. senator from Rhode Island
- Nathan F. Dixon I (A.B. 1799) – U.S. senator, Rhode Island
- Nathan F. Dixon III (A.B. 1869) – U.S. senator from Rhode Island
- James Fenner (A.B. 1789) – U.S. senator from Rhode Island
- Dwight Foster (A.B. 1774) – U.S. senator from Massachusetts
- Lafayette S. Foster (A.B. 1828) – U.S. senator, Connecticut (1855–1867), president pro tempore of the Senate (1865–1867)

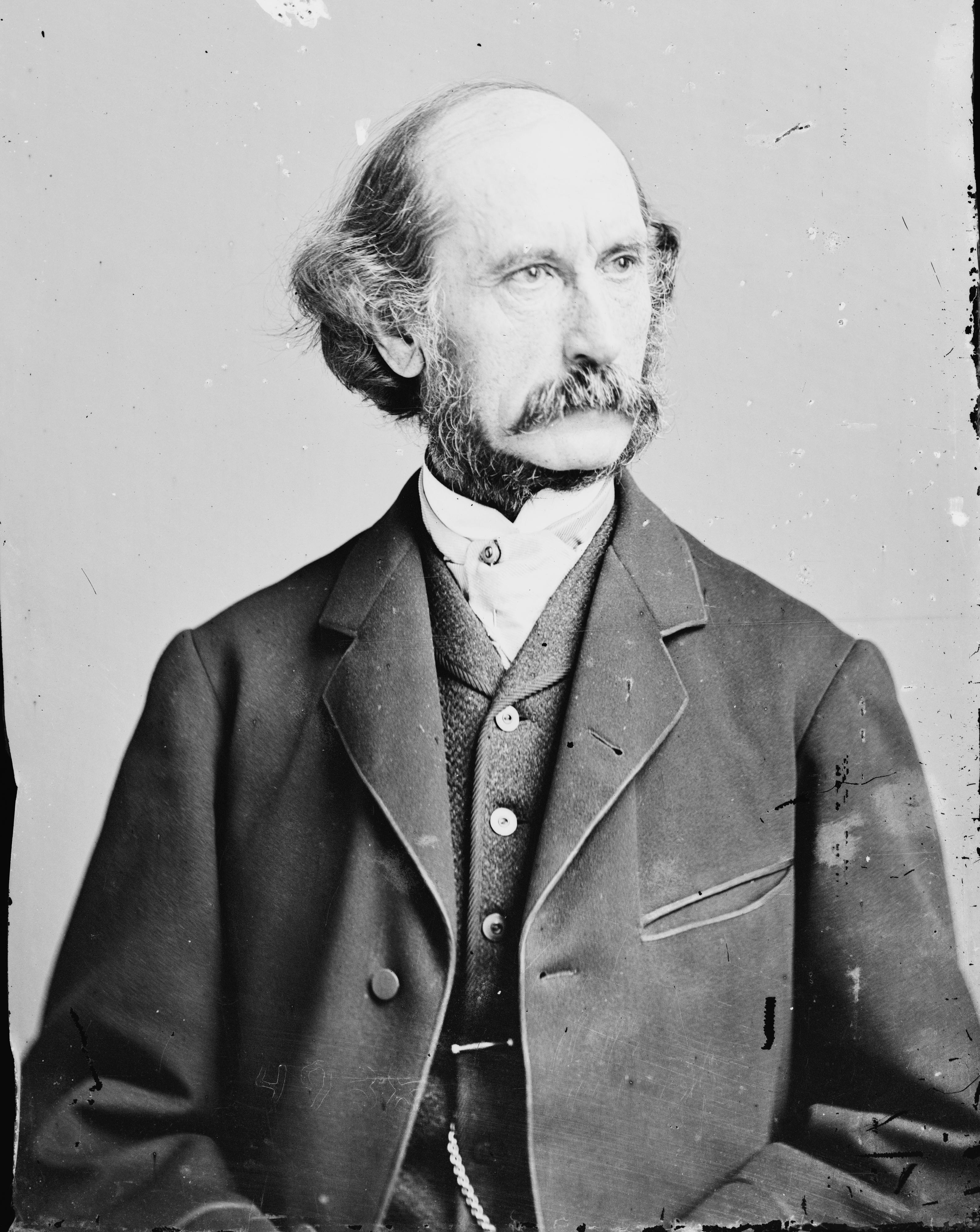
Lafayette S. Foster (1828)

- Theodore Foster (A.B. 1770) – U.S. senator from Rhode Island
- John Brown Francis (A.B. 1808) – U.S. senator from Rhode Island
- Theodore F. Green (A.B. 1887) – U.S. senator, Rhode Island (1937–1961)
- Maggie Hassan (A.B. 1980) – 81st governor of New Hampshire (2013–2017); U.S. senator, D–New Hampshire (2017–)
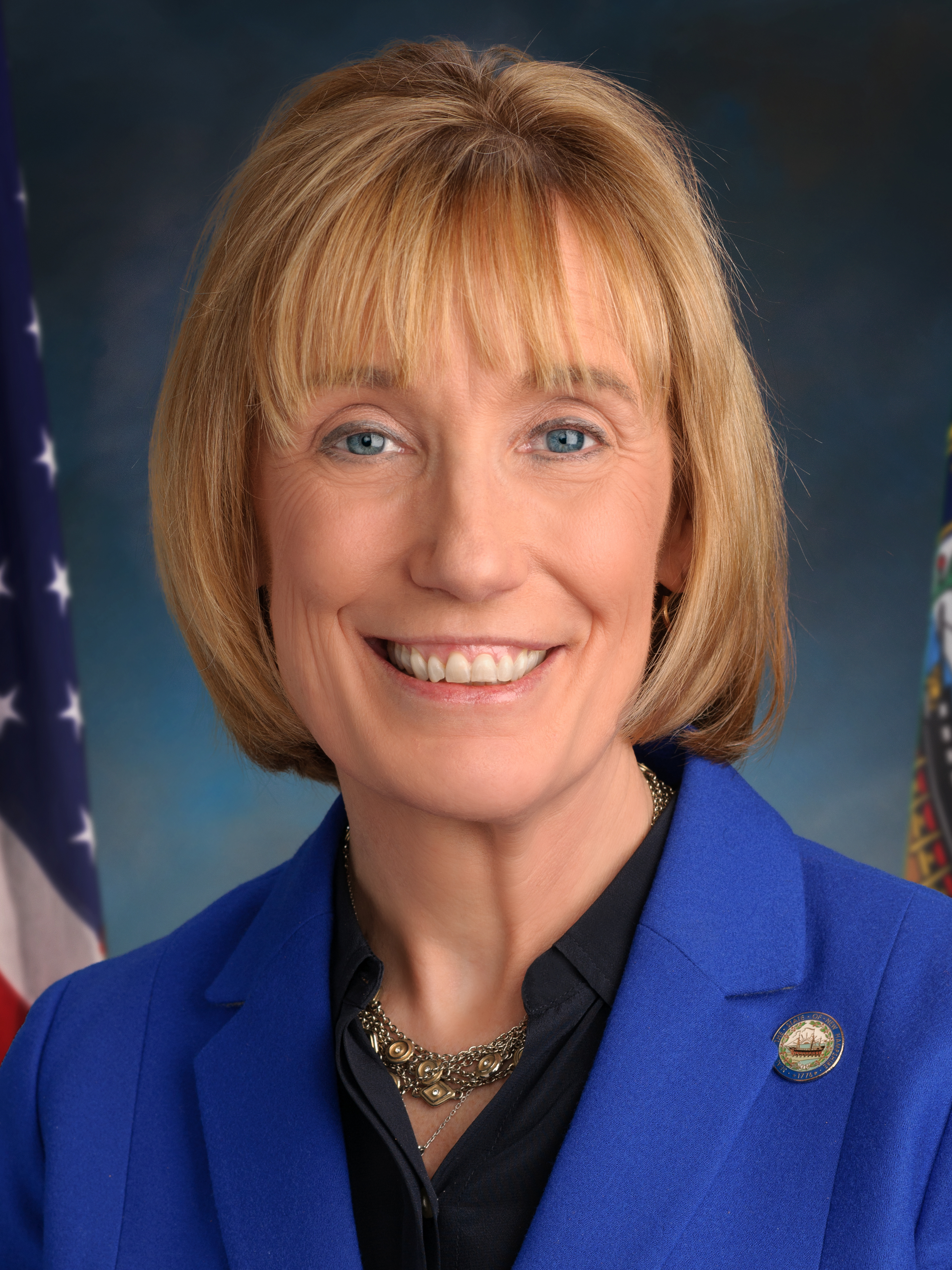
  Maggie Hassan (1980)
- Nathaniel P. Hill (A.B. 1856) – U.S. senator, Colorado (1879–1885)
- John Holmes (A.B. 1796) – U.S. congressman, Massachusetts (1817–1820), U.S. Senator, Maine (1820–1827, 1829–1833)
- Jeremiah B. Howell (A.B. 1789) – U.S. senator, Rhode Island (1811–1817)
- William Hunter (A.B. 1791) – U.S. senator, Rhode Island (1811–1821)
- Edward L. Leahy (A.B.) – U.S. senator, Rhode Island (1949–1950)
- Henry F. Lippitt (A.B. 1878) – U.S. senator, Rhode Island (1911–1917)
- William L. Marcy (A.B. 1808) – U.S. senator, New York (1831–1833)
- Blair Moody (A.B. 1922) – U.S. senator, Michigan (1951–1952)
- John Ruggles (A.B. 1813) – U.S. senator from Maine (1835–1841)
- Frederic M. Sackett (1890) – U.S. senator, Kentucky (1924–1930), U.S. ambassador to Germany (1930–1933)
- John Milton Thayer (1841) – U.S. senator, Nebraska (1867–1871)

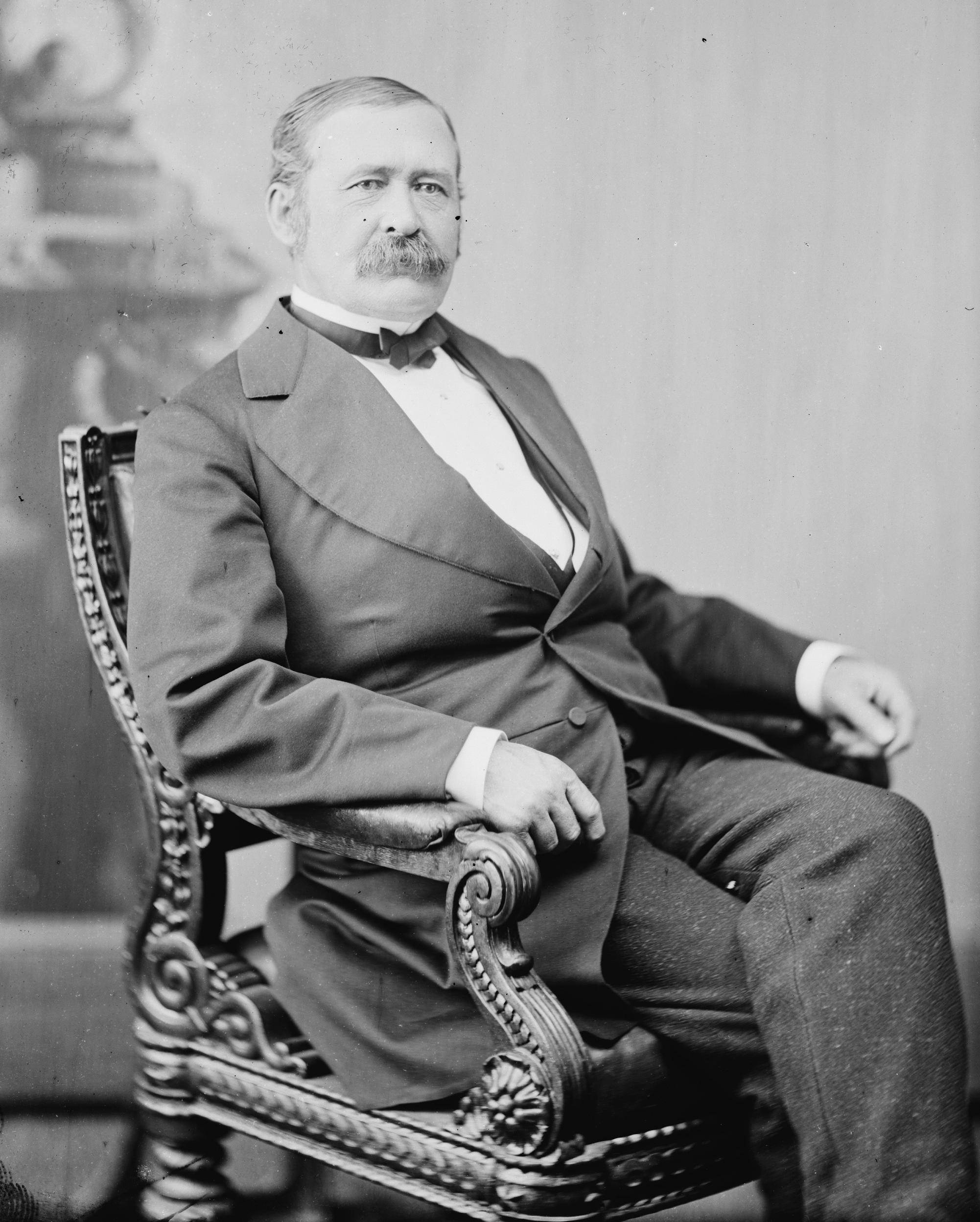
John Milton Thayer (1841)

- Jared W. Williams (A.B. 1818) – U.S. senator, New Hampshire (1853–1854); U.S. congressman, New Hampshire (1837–1841); 21st governor of New Hampshire (1847–1849)

==== United States representatives ====
- Benjamin Adams (A.B. 1788) – U.S. congressman, Massachusetts (1816–1821)
- Jeremiah Bailey (1795) – U.S. congressman, Maine (1835–1837)
- John Bailey (1807) – U.S. congressman, Massachusetts (1824–1831)
- John Baldwin (A.B. 1797) – U.S. congressman, Connecticut (1825–1829)
- Gideon Barstow (1803) – U.S. congressman, Massachusetts (1821–1823)
- William Baylies (1795) – U.S. congressman, Massachusetts (1809–1809, 1813–1817, 1833–1835)
- William H. Bates (1940) – U.S. congressman, Massachusetts (1950–1969)
- Barnabas Bidwell – U.S. congressman, Massachusetts (1805 –1807)
- William Daniel Brayton – U.S. congressman, Rhode Island (1857–1861)
- Franklin E. Brooks (1883) – U.S. Congressman, Colorado (1903–1907)
- George H. Browne (1840) – U.S. congressman, Rhode Island (1861–1863)
- Tristam Burges (A.B. 1796) – U.S. congressman, Rhode Island (1825–1835)
- David Cicilline (A.B. 1983) – first openly gay mayor of a state capital, Providence, Rhode Island; U.S. congressman, Rhode Island (2011–2023)
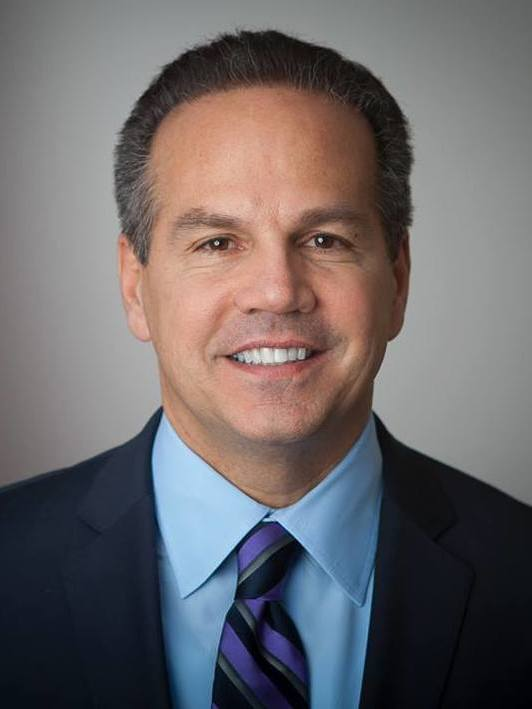
  David Cicilline (1983)
- Gil Cisneros (M.A. 2015) – U.S. congressman, California (2019–2021, 2025–present), 10th Under Secretary of Defense for Personnel and Readiness
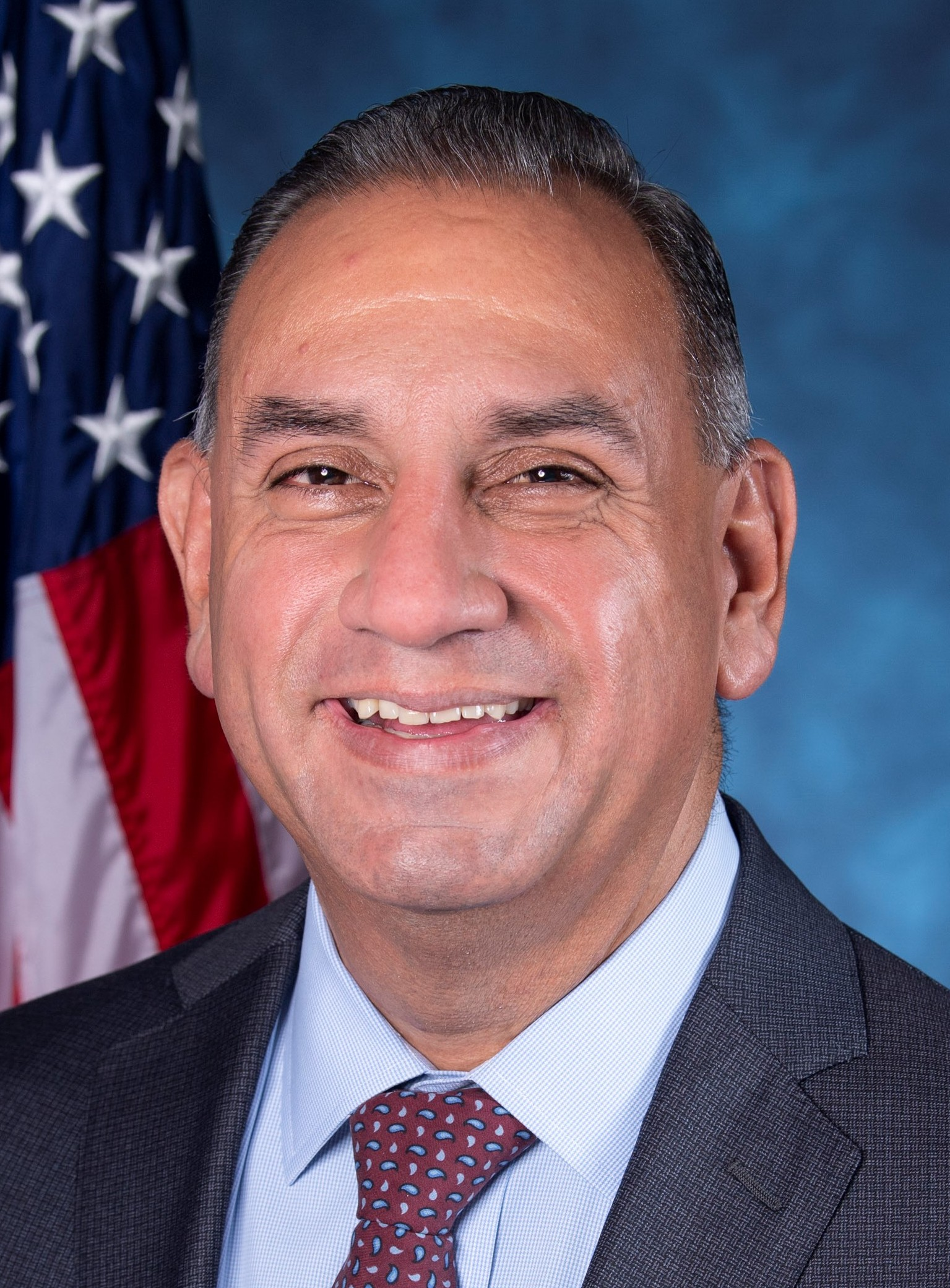
  Gil Cisneros (2015)
- William Claflin – U.S. congressman, Massachusetts (1877 –1881)
- Stephen A. Cobb (1858) – U.S. congressman, Kansas (1873–1875)
- Howard A. Coffin (1901) – U.S. congressman, Michigan (1947–1949)
- Samuel S. Cox (1846) – U.S. congressman, Ohio, New York, U.S. ambassador to the Ottoman Empire
- Samuel L. Crocker (1822) – U.S. congressman, Massachusetts (1853–1855)
- Robert Lee Davis – U.S. congressman, Pennsylvania (1932–1933)
- Nathan F. Dixon II (1833) – U.S. congressman, Rhode Island (1849–1851, 1863–1871)
- Job Durfee (A.B. 1813) – U.S. congressman, Rhode Island (1821–1825)
- Samuel Eddy (1787) – U.S. congressman, Rhode Island (1819–1825), chief justice of the Rhode Island Supreme Court (1827–1835)
- Frederick D. Ely (1859) – U.S. congressman, Massachusetts (1885–1887)
- James Ervin (1797) – U.S. congressman, South Carolina (1817–1821)
- Horace Everett (A.B. 1797) – U.S. congressman, Vermont (1829–1843)
- Thomas Ewing Jr. – U.S. congressman, Ohio (1877–1881)
- George Fisher (1813) – U.S. congressman, New York (1829–1830)
- Dwight Foster (A.B. 1774) – U.S. congressman, Massachusetts (1793–1800)
- George B. Francis (1904) – U.S. congressman, New York (1917–1919)
- Daniel L. D. Granger (1874) – U.S. congressman, Rhode Island (1903–1909)
- Julian Hartridge (1848) – U.S. congressman, Georgia (1875–1879)
- Nathaniel Hazard (1792) – U.S. congressman, Rhode Island (1819–1820)
- Aaron Hobart (1805) – U.S. congressman, Massachusetts (1820–1827)
- Thomas Jenckes (1838) – U.S. congressman, Massachusetts (1859–1863)
- Piyush "Bobby" Jindal (Sc.B. 1992) – U.S. congressman, Louisiana (2004–2008)
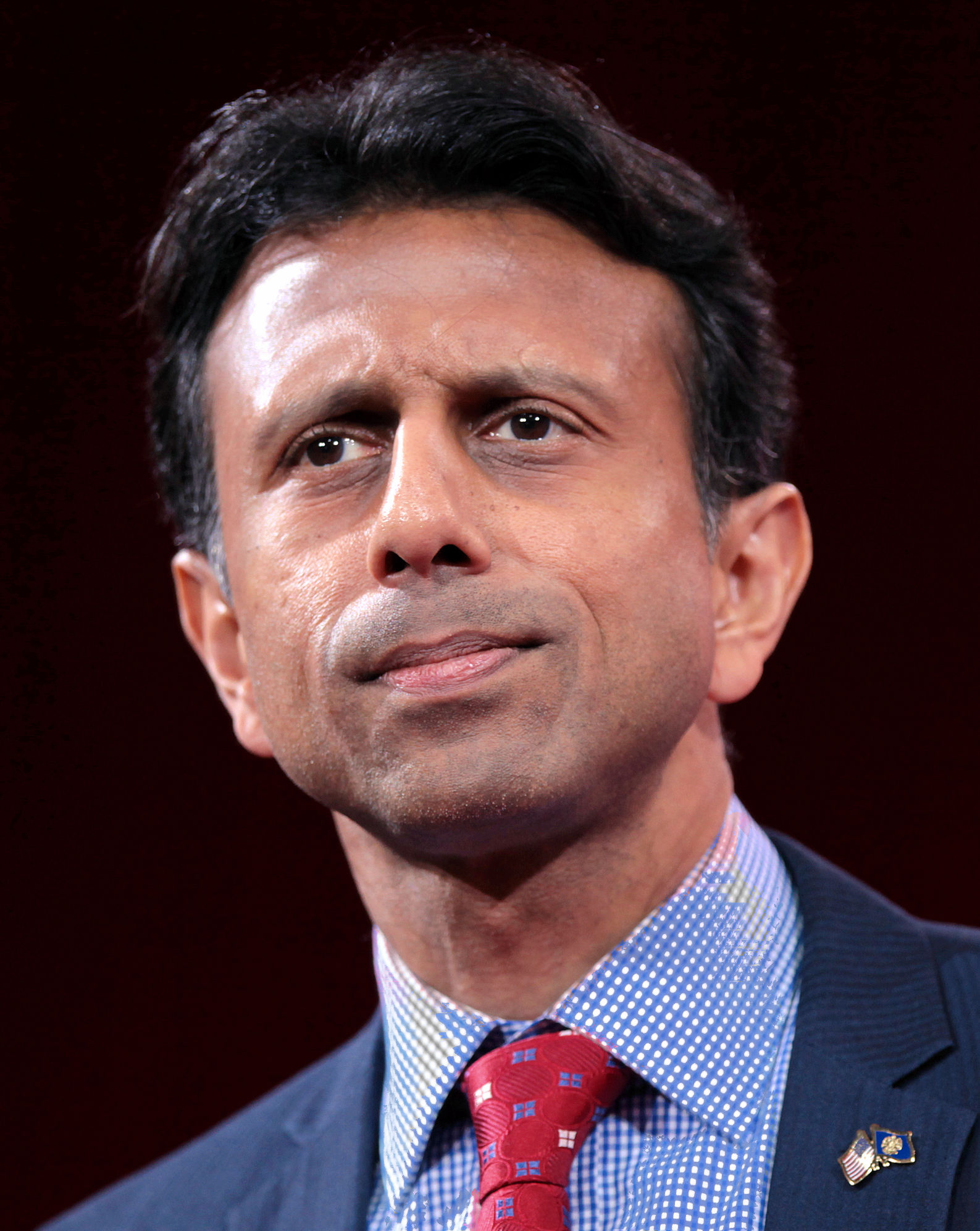
  Bobby Jindal (1992)
- George Gordon King (1825) – U.S. congressman, Rhode Island (1849–1853)
- Oscar Lapham (1864) – U.S. congressman, Rhode Island (1891–1895)
- Dan Maffei (A.B. 1990) – U.S. congressman, D-New York (2009–2011, 2013–2015)
- Seth Magaziner (A.B. 2006) – U.S. congressman, D-Rhode Island (2022–)
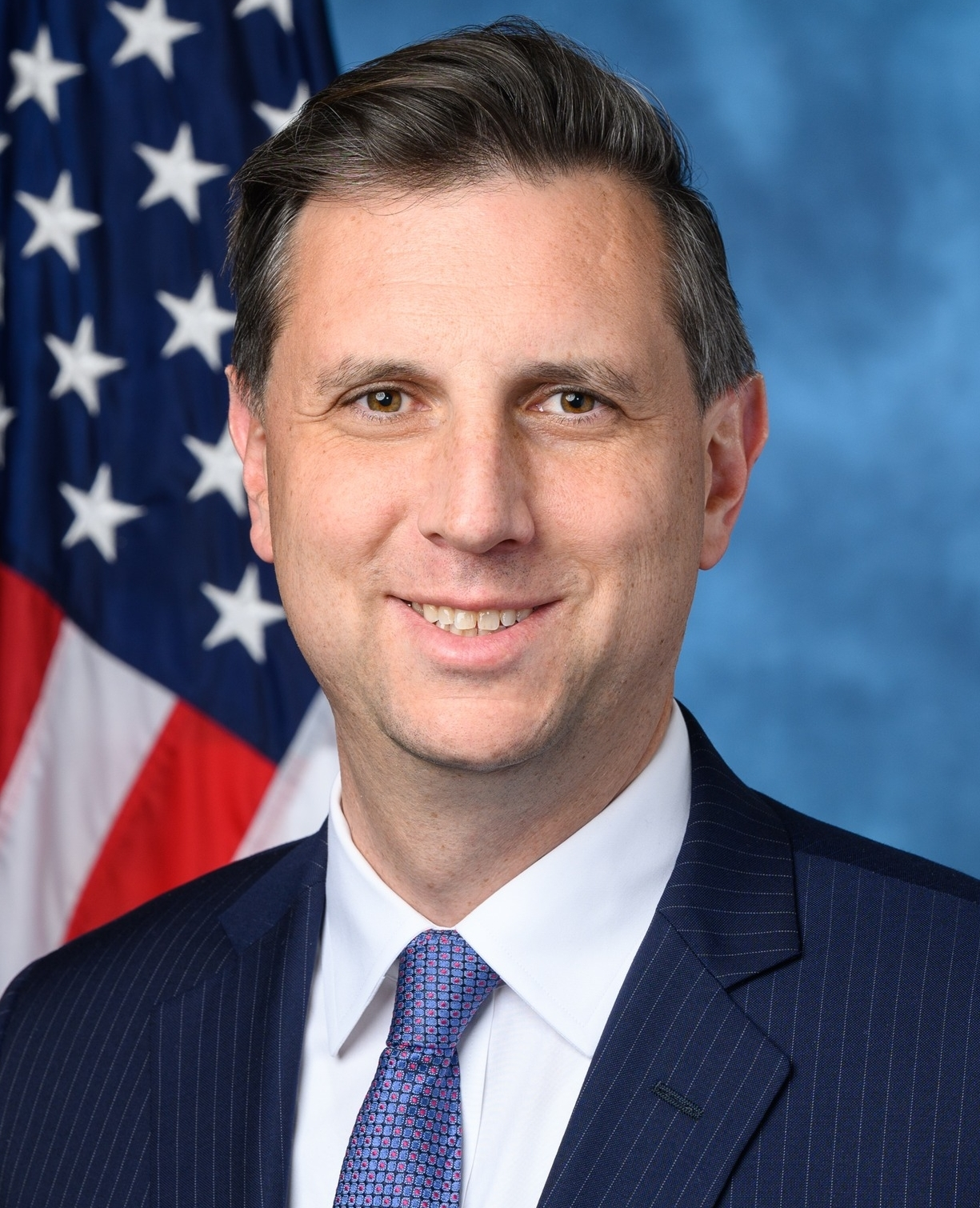
  Seth Magaziner (2006)
- Horace Mann (A.B. 1819) – U.S. congressman, Massachusetts (1848–1853)
- James Brown Mason (A.B. 1791) – U.S. congressman, Rhode Island (1815–1819)
- Charles D. Millard (1897) – U.S. congressman, New York (1931–1937)
- Marcus Morton (A.B. 1804, A.M 1807) – U.S. congressman, Massachusetts (1817–1821); Governor of Massachusetts (1825, 1840–1844)
- John J. O'Connor (1906) – U.S. congressman, New York (1923–1939)
- Richard Olney II (1892) – U.S. congressman, Massachusetts (1815–1921)
- Dutee Jerauld Pearce (A.B. 1808) – U.S. congressman, Rhode Island (1825–1837)
- Dean Phillips (A.B. 1991) – U.S. congressman, Minnesota (2019–); former candidate for the 2024 Democratic Party presidential nomination
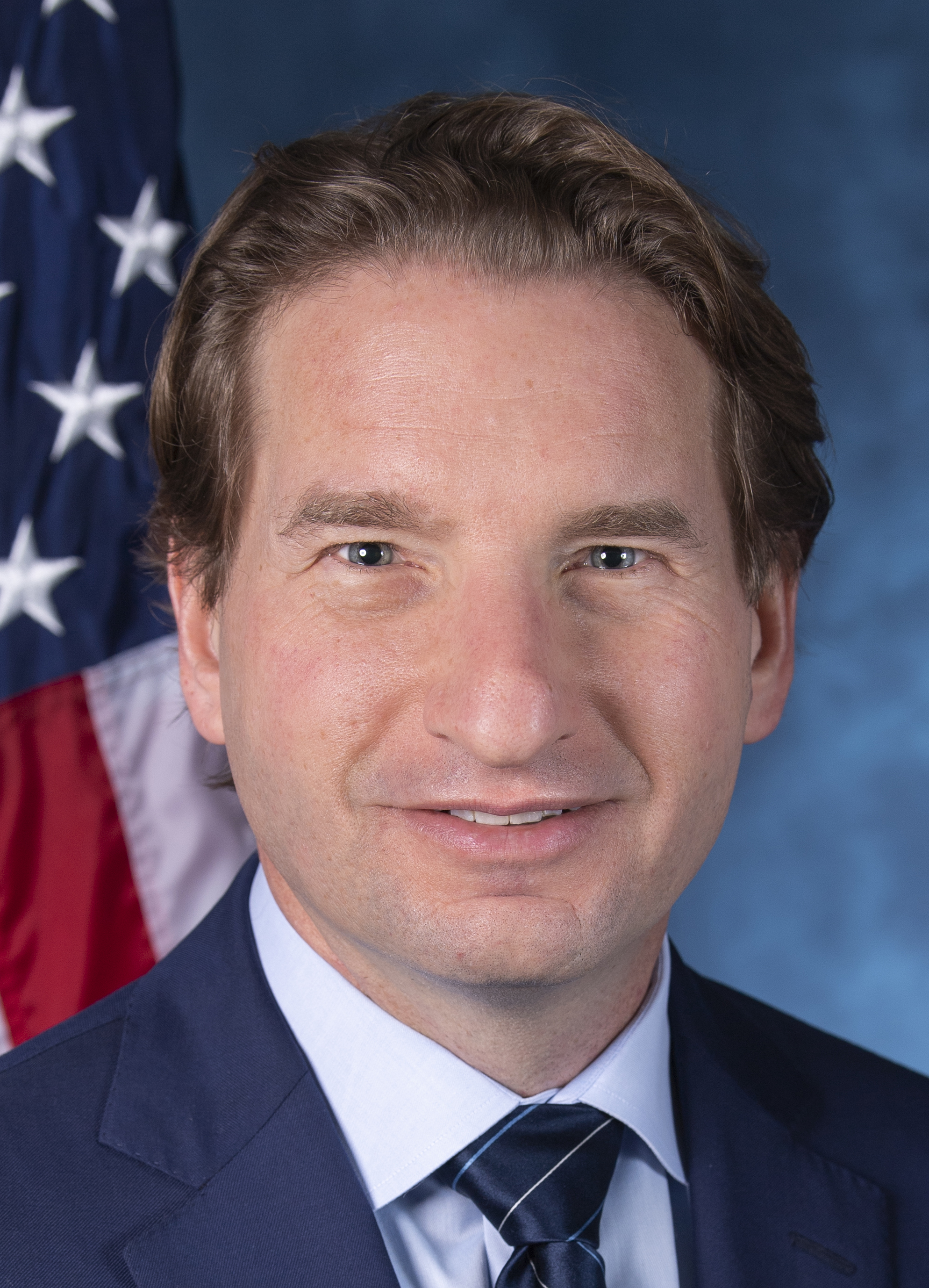
  Dean Phillips (1991)
- Henry Kirke Porter (1860) – U.S. congressman, Pennsylvania (1903–1905)
- John Reed Jr. (1803) – U.S. congressman, Massachusetts (1813–1817, 1821–1841)
- Edwin R. Reynolds (1839) – U.S. congressman, New York (1860–1861)
- Christopher Robinson (1825) – U.S. congressman, Rhode Island (1859–1861)
- Deborah Ross (1985) – U.S. congresswoman, North Carolina (2021–present)
- Jonathan Russell (1791) – U.S. congressman, Massachusetts (1820)
- Zabdiel Sampson (1803) – U.S. congressman, Massachusetts (1817–1820)
- William P. Sheffield, II (1877) – U.S. congressman, Rhode Island (1909–1911)
- Solomon Sibley (1794) – first United States attorney for the Michigan Territory; territorial delegate to Congress
- Thomas Hale Sill (1804) – U.S. congressman, Pennsylvania (1826 –1827, 1829 –1831)
- Edward L. Sittler Jr. (1930) – U.S. congressman, Pennsylvania, 23rd Congressional District
- Albert Smith (1813) – U.S. congressman, Maine (1839–1841)
- Henry J. Spooner (1860) – U.S. congressman, Rhode Island (1881–1891)
- Walter Russell Stiness (1877) – U.S. congressman, Rhode Island (1815–1823)
- Ebenezer Stoddard (1807) – U.S. congressman, Connecticut
- James Tallmadge Jr. (1798) – U.S. congressman, New York (1817–1819), assisted the founding of New York University
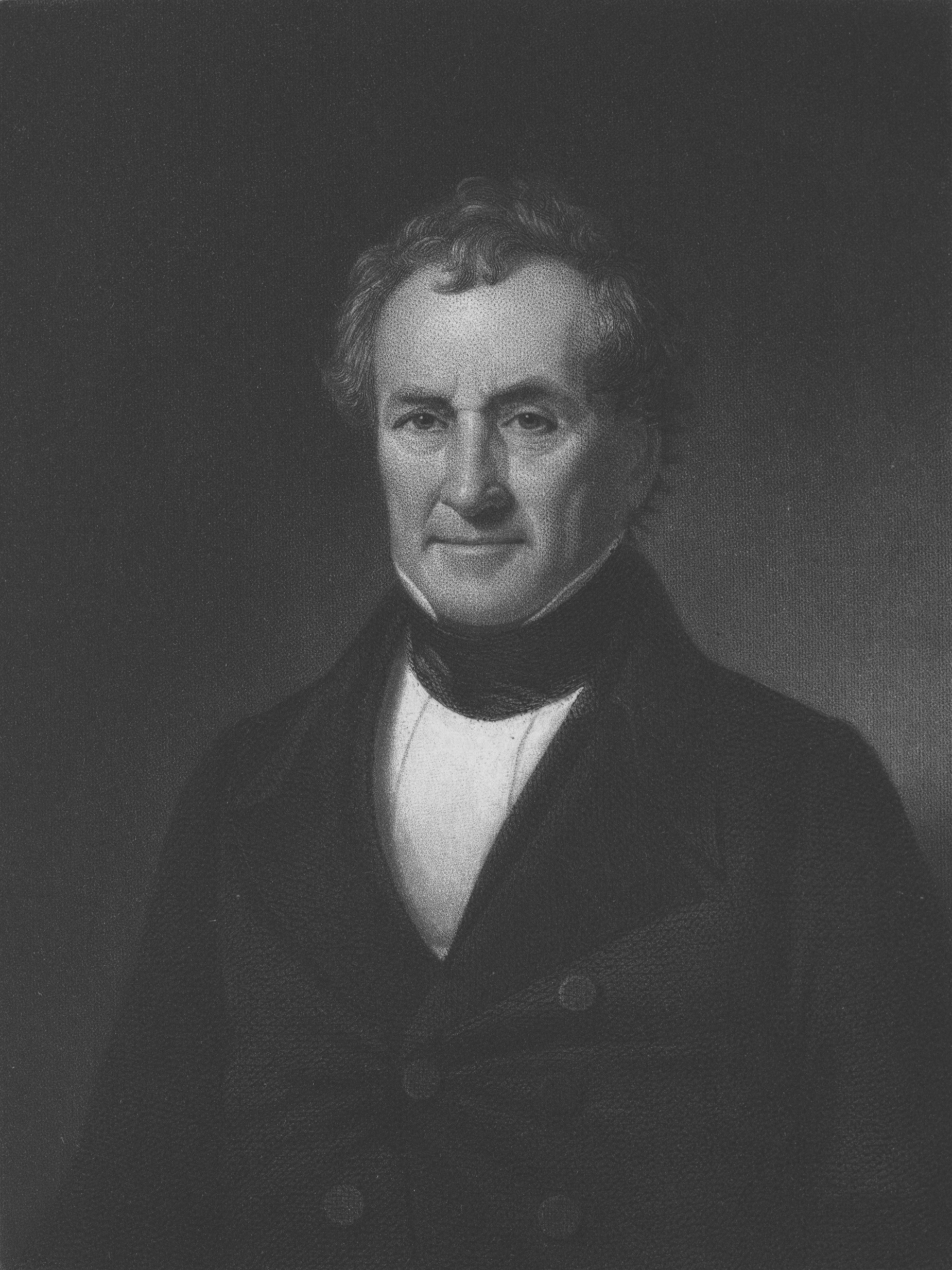
  James Tallmadge Jr. (1798)
- Eli Thayer (1845) – U.S. congressman, Massachusetts (1857–1861)
- Benjamin Thomas (1830) – U.S. congressman, Massachusetts (1861–1863)
- Charles R. Train (1837) – U.S. congressman, Massachusetts (1859–1863)
- Daniel Wardwell (1811) – U.S. congressman, New York (1831–1837)
- Ezekiel Whitman (1795) – U.S. congressman, Maine (1835–1837)
- David Rogerson Williams (1792–1795) – U.S. congressman, South Carolina (1811– 1813), governor of South Carolina (1814–1816)
- Henry Williams (1826) – U.S. congressman, Massachusetts (1839 –1831, 1843–1845)
- William D. Williamson (1804) – U.S. congressman, Massachusetts (1809–1811) and Maine (1821–1822)
- William Widnall (1926) – U.S. congressman, New Jersey (1950–1975)
- John W. Wydler (1947) – U.S. congressman, New York (1963–1981)

==== State legislators ====
- Michael Abbott (A.B. 1970) – member of New Hampshire House of Representatives (2014–present)
- Jonathon Acosta (A.B. 2011, A.M. 2016, A.M. 2019, Ph.D. 2025) – member of Rhode Island Senate (2021–present)
- William Ames – member of Rhode Island House of Representatives
- Robert Arnould (Class of 1976) – member of Iowa House of Representatives (1977–1995)
- Sullivan Ballou (Class of 1852) – member of Rhode Island House of Representatives; Major in Rhode Island militia; killed at First Battle of Bull Run
- Toby Barker (2015) – member of Mississippi House of Representatives (2008–2017)
- Wendell B. Barnes (1928) – member of Oklahoma House of Representatives (1950–1952), 2nd administrator of the Small Business Administration
- Philip Baruth (A.B. 1984) – 83rd president pro tempore of the Vermont Senate, majority leader of the Vermont Senate (2013–2017)
- Sam Bell (A.M. 2014, Ph.D. 2016) – member of Rhode Island Senate (2019–present)
- Brian Benjamin (A.B. 1998) – member of the New York State Senate (2017–2021), lieutenant governor of New York (2021–2022)
- Steve Bennett (1972) – member of California State Assembly (2020–present)
- Seth Berry (1991) – member of Maine House of Representatives (2006–2014, 2016–present)
- Nate Blouin (2020) – member of Utah State Senate (2023–present)
- Erastus Brooks (attended) – member of New York State Senate and New York State Assembly
- Elon R. Brown (1876) – majority leader of the New York State Senate (1915–1918)
- Nathaniel Bullock (1798) – speaker of Rhode Island House of Representatives
- Bridget Burkhardt (A.B. 1995) – member of Vermont House of Representatives (2025–present)
- Antonio F. D. Cabral (1997) – member of the Massachusetts House of Representatives (1990–present)
- Jack Cera (A.B. 1978) – member of Ohio House of Representatives
- Ela Chapin (Sc.B. 1998) – member of Vermont House of Representatives (2023–present)
- David Cicilline (A.B. 1983) – member of Rhode Island House of Representatives (2011–2023)
- Everett Colby (1897) – member of New Jersey General Assembly (1904–1906) and member of New Jersey Senate (1906–1909)
- Cherie Cruz (A.B. 2009, A.M. 2010) – member of Rhode Island House of Representatives (2023–present)
- Lauren Davis (A.B. 2009) – member of Washington House of Representatives (2019–present)
- Louis DiPalma (Sc.M. 1989) – member of the Rhode Island Senate (2009–present)
- Elisha Dyer Jr. (1856) – member of the Rhode Island Senate (1877–1904)
- Kirsten Engel (A.B. 1983) – member of Arizona House of Representatives (2017–2021) and Arizona Senate (2021)
- S. Thomas Gagliano (A.B. 1954) – member of New Jersey Senate (1978–1989)
- G. Ellsworth Gale, Jr. (A.B. 1922) – member of Rhode Island House of Representatives (1954–1956) and Rhode Island Senate (1956–1964)
- Kyle Evans Gay (A.B. 2008) – member of Delaware Senate (2021–2025), 27th Lieutenant Governor of Delaware (2025–present)
- Alfred A. Gemma (1960) – member of Rhode Island House of Representatives (2005–2011)
- Traci Gere (A.B. 1986) – member of Maine House of Representatives (2022–present)
- Solomon Goldstein-Rose (2016) – member of Massachusetts House of Representatives (2017–2019)
- Dan Greenberg (A.B. 1988) – member of the Arkansas General Assembly (2006–2011)
- Will Guzzardi (A.B. 2009) – member of Illinois House of Representatives (2015–present)
- Elijah Hamlin – member of the Maine House of Representatives (1830–1832) and Maine Senate
- Steve Harrison (1990) – member of the West Virginia State Senate (2003–2006) and the West Virginia House of Delegates (1993–2002)
- Wingate Hayes (1844) – speaker of the Rhode Island House of Representatives (1859-1860)
- Benjamin Hazard (1792) – speaker of the Rhode Island House of Representatives (1816–1818)
- Ratcliffe Hicks (1864) – member of the Connecticut House of Representatives (1866–1895), benefactor of the University of Connecticut
- Robert Benjamin Hilton (1843) – member of Florida House of Representatives
- Rebecca Holcombe (A.B. 1988) – member of Vermont House of Representatives
- Ezekiel Holmes (1821) – member of Maine House of Representatives and Maine Senate
- Carl Hosticka (BA 1965) -- member of Oregon House of Representatives (1983-1995) and Portland Metro Council (2001-2012)
- Emmons Johnson (attended) – member of Iowa Senate
- Meghan Kallman (Ph.D. 2016) – member of Rhode Island Senate
- Walter M. D. Kern – member of New Jersey General Assembly (1978–1990)
- Jeff King (A.B. 1997) – member of Kansas House of Representatives (2007–2011) and Kansas Senate (2011–2017)
- Rebecca Kislak (A.B. 1994) – member of Rhode Island House of Representatives (2019–present)
- Peter Kocot (A.B. 1978) – member of Massachusetts House of Representatives (2002–2018)
- J. Michael Lenihan (A.M. 1968) – member of Rhode Island Senate (1990–2010)
- Dana Levenberg (1986) – member of the New York State Assembly (2023–present), Town Supervisor of Ossining (2016–2022)
- Stefanie Mach (2011) – member of the Arizona House of Representatives (2013–2017)
- Tiara Mack (A.B. 2016) – member of the Rhode Island Senate (2021–present)
- Tom McCormick (1947) – member of the New Hampshire House of Representatives
- Mee Moua (1992) – Minnesota State Senator, first elected Hmong-American politician
- Donna Nesselbush (A.B. 1984) – member of the Rhode Island Senate (2011–2021)
- Michael C. Nichols (A.B. 1974) – member of the Georgia House of Representatives (1977–1980)
- William Norbert (A.B. 1990) – member of Maine House of Representatives (1998–2004)
- Manuel Rodríguez Orellana (A.M. 1972) – member of Senate of Puerto Rico (1999–2001)
- Steven Owens (A.B. 1999) – member of Massachusetts House of Representatives (2021–present)
- Louis Pastore (1954) – member of Rhode Island Senate (1971–1976)
- Cornelius W. Pendleton (1881) – speaker of the California State Assembly (1901)
- Bill Perkins (1972) – member of New York State Senate (2007–2017)
- Hannah Pingree (A.B. 1998) – speaker of the Maine House of Representatives (2008–2010)
- William Francis Ray – member of Massachusetts House of Representatives and Massachusetts Senate
- Aaron Regunberg (A.B. 2012) – member of the Rhode Island House of Representatives (2015–2019)
- Abbott Barnes Rice (A.B. 1884, A.M. 1889) – member of the Massachusetts House of Representatives (1919–1922) and Massachusetts Senate (1923–1926)
- José Javier Rodríguez (A.B. 2000) – member of Florida House of Representatives (2012–2016) and Florida Senate (2016–2020)
- Samuel Rotondi (A.B. 1969) – member of the Massachusetts Senate (1977–1983)
- Steve Sandell (A.B. 1962) – member of Minnesota House of Representatives (2019–2023)
- John Day Smith (1872) – member of the Minnesota House of Representatives (1889–1890) and Minnesota Senate (1891–1894)
- Chris Soto (2011) – member of Connecticut House of Representatives (2017–2019)
- Mark Strama (A.B. 1990) – member of the Texas House of Representatives
- Chipalo Street (Sc.B. 2006, Sc.M. 2007) – member of Washington House of Representatives
- Reena Szczepanski (A.B. 1998) – majority leader of the New Mexico House of Representatives
- Austin Volk (1941) – member of the New Jersey General Assembly and mayor of Englewood, New Jersey
- Joseph Walker (1887) – speaker of the Massachusetts House of Representatives
- Mark L. Walker (A.B. 1974, A.M. 1974) – member of Illinois House of Representatives and Illinois Senate
- Reuel Washburn (1815) – member of the Maine Senate and Maine House of Representatives
- David H. Watters (Ph.D. 1979) – member of the New Hampshire House of Representatives (2008–2012) and New Hampshire Senate (2012–present)
- Albert Benjamin West (A.B. 1904, A.M. 1904) – member of Rhode Island House of Representatives
- Lemuel Williams Jr. (1804) – member of Massachusetts House of Representatives and Massachusetts Senate
- George C. Wing Jr. (1900) – member of Maine House of Representatives
- Leslie Winner (A.B. 1972) – member of North Carolina Senate

=== Mayors ===
- Peter C. Bacon (1827) – 3rd mayor of Worcester, Massachusetts
- William C. Baker (A.B. 1881) – 20th mayor of Providence, Rhode Island
- Kostas Bakoyannis (A.B. 2000) – mayor of Athens, Greece (2019–2023)
- Toby Barker (2015) – 35th mayor of Hattiesburg, Mississippi
- Samuel W. Bridgham (1794) – 1st mayor of Providence, Rhode Island
- Albert D. Bosson (1875) – 17th mayor of Chelsea, Massachusetts
- Thomas M. Burgess (1822) – 2nd mayor of Providence, Rhode Island
- Henry Chapin (1835) – 2nd mayor of Worcester, Massachusetts
- David Cicilline (A.B. 1983) – first openly gay mayor of a state capital; 36th mayor of Providence, Rhode Island; U.S. congressman, Rhode Island (2011–)
- Walter R. Danforth (1805) – 4th mayor of Providence, Rhode Island
- Isaac Davis (1822) – 6th, 8th, and 11th mayor of Worcester, Massachusetts
- Buddy Dyer (Sc.B. 1980) – 32nd mayor of Orlando, Florida (2003–)
- Elisha Dyer Jr. (1856) – 23rd mayor of Providence, Rhode Island
- Daniel L. D. Granger (A.B. 1874, A.M. 1902) – 21st mayor of Providence, Rhode Island
- Benjamin F. Haines – 8th mayor of Medford, Massachusetts; Mayor of Altamonte Springs, Florida
- Henry Loeb (1943) – mayor of Memphis, Tennessee (1960–1963, 1968–1971)
- Edwin D. McGuinness (A.B. 1877) – 19th mayor of Providence, Rhode Island
- Augustus S. Miller (1871) – 22nd mayor of Providence, Rhode Island
- Alex Morse (A.B. 2011) – 44th mayor of Holyoke, Massachusetts (2012–2021); elected youngest mayor of Holyoke at age 22
- Oliver B. Munroe (A.M.) – mayor of Melrose, Massachusetts
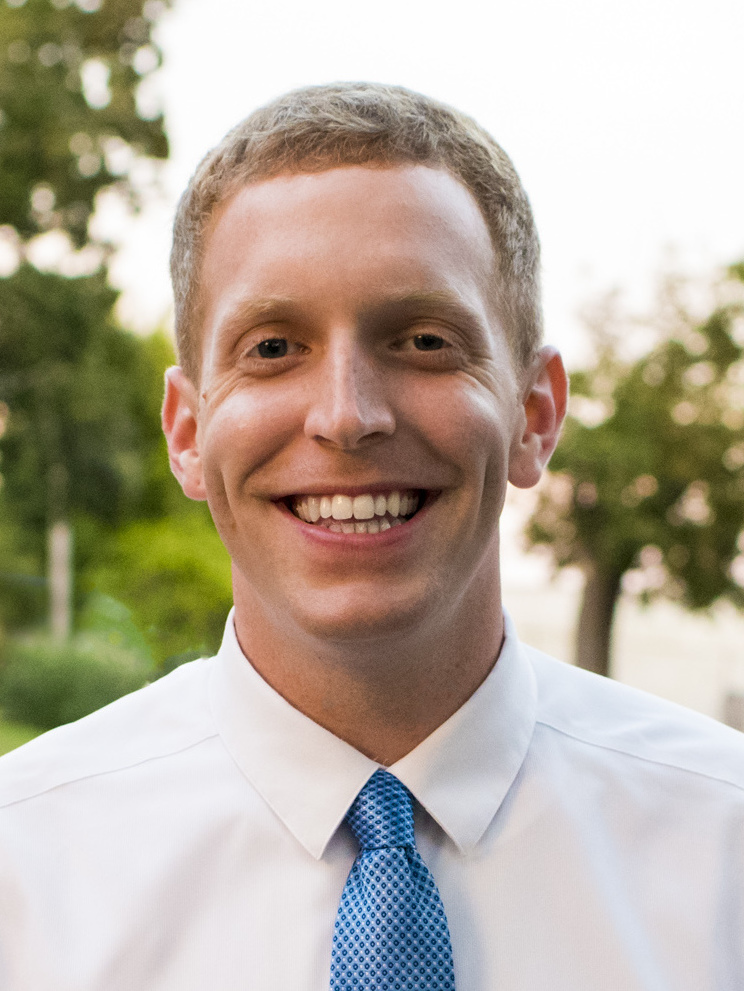
  Alex Morse (2011)
- Freddie O'Connell (A.B., Sc.B. 2000) – 10th mayor of Nashville, Tennessee
- Chelsie J. Senerchia – 26th mayor of Miami, Florida (1951–1953)
- Solomon Sibley (A.B. 1794) – 1st mayor of Detroit, Michigan (1806–1806)
- Sumbul Siddiqui (A.B. 2010) – Mayor of Cambridge, Massachusetts (2020–); first Muslim mayor in Massachusetts history
- Jerome V. C. Smith (M.D. 1818) – mayor of Boston, Massachusetts (1854–1856)
- Samuel Starkweather (1822) – 7th and 15th mayor of Cleveland, Ohio (1844–1845, 1857–1858)
- Elijah B. Stoddard (1847) – 23rd mayor of Worcester, Massachusetts
- Sam Sutter (A.B. 1976) – 43rd mayor of Fall River, Massachusetts
- Henry Traphagen – 19th mayor of Jersey City, New Jersey
- Konstantinos Zervas (Sc.M. 1989) – mayor of Thessaloniki, Greece (2019–2023)

=== Diplomats ===
- Willard L. Beaulac (1918) – U.S. ambassador to Paraguay (1944–1947), Colombia (1947–1951), Cuba (1951–1953), Chile (1953–1956) and Argentina (1956–1960)
- Taylor G. Belcher (1941) – U.S. ambassador to Cyprus (1964–1969) and Peru (1969–1974)
- W. Randolph Burgess (1912) – U.S. ambassador to NATO (1957–1961)
- Mercer Cook (A.M. 1931, Ph.D. 1936) – U.S. ambassador to Niger (1961–1964), Senegal (1964–1966), and the Gambia (1964–1966)
- William H. Courtney (Ph.D. 1972) – U.S. ambassador to Georgia (1995–1997) and Kazakhstan (1992–1994)
- Samuel S. Cox (1846) – U.S. ambassador to the Ottoman Empire (1885–1886)
- Nathaniel Davis (1944) – U.S. ambassador to Switzerland (1976–1977), Chile (1971–1973), Guatemala (1968–1971), and Bulgaria (1965–1966); director general of the Foreign Service (1973–1975)
- Roy T. Davis (A.B. 1910) – U.S. ambassador to Costa Rica (1922–1930), Panama (1930–1933), and Haiti (1953–1957)
- Rosemary DiCarlo (A.B. 1969, M.A. 1971, Ph.D. 1979) – acting U.S. ambassador to the United Nations (2013)
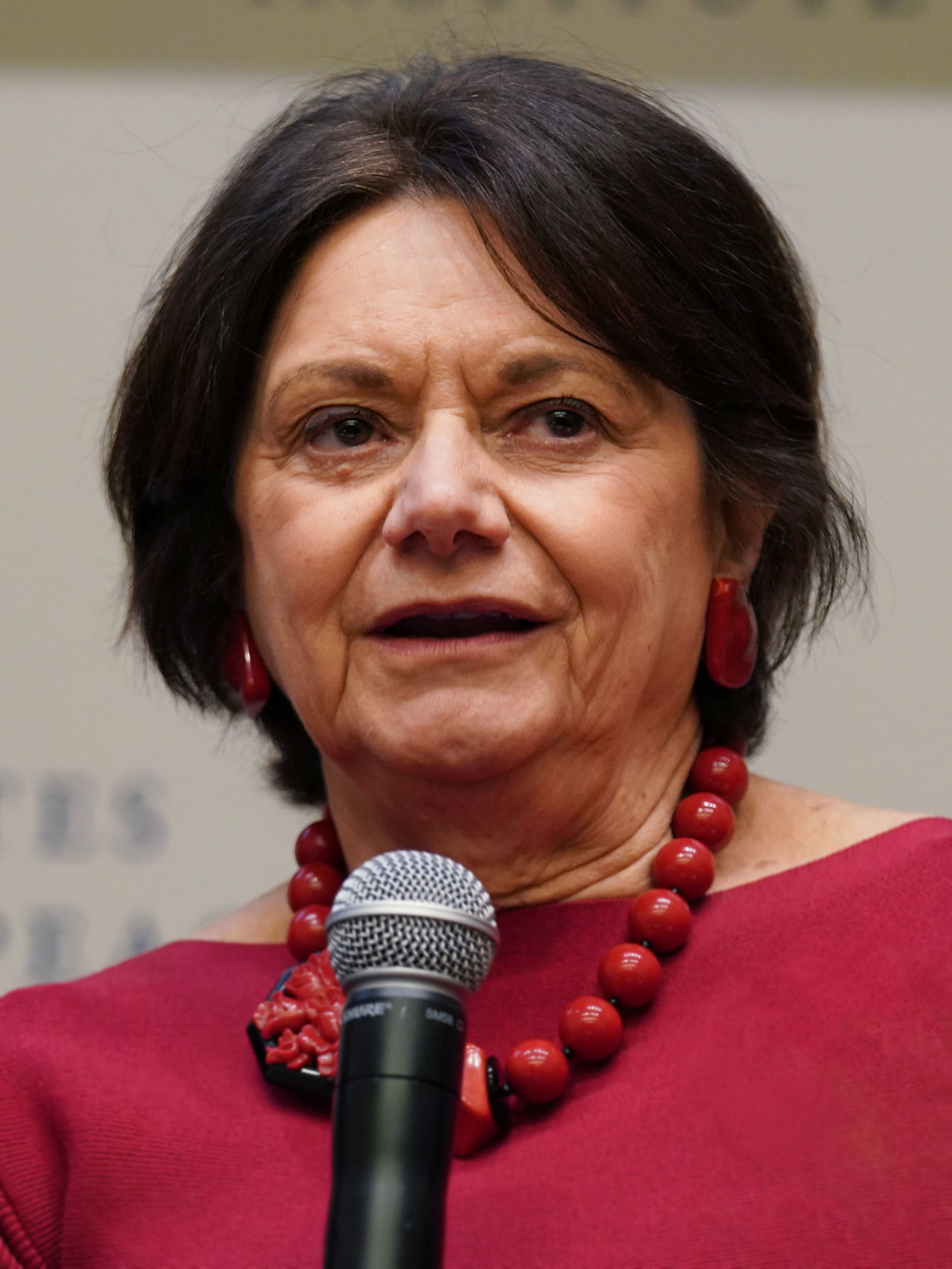
  Rosemary DiCarlo (1969)
- J. Thomas Dougherty – U.S. ambassador to Burkina Faso (2010–2013)
- Norm Eisen (A.B. 1985) – U.S. ambassador to the Czech Republic (2011–2014)
- Ana A. Escrogima (A.B. 2001) – U.S. smbassador to Oman (2023–present)
- Ronald Gidwitz (A.B. 1967) – acting U.S. ambassador to the European Union (2020–2021) and Belgium (2018–2021)
- Rufus Gifford (A.B. 1996) – U.S. ambassador to Denmark (2013–2017), Deputy Campaign Manager for Joe Biden's 2020 presidential campaign, chief of protocol of the United States
- John Hay (A.B. 1858) – 37th U.S. Secretary of State (1898–1905)
- Richard Holbrooke (A.B. 1962) – U.S. ambassador to the United Nations (1999–2001), U.S. assistant secretary of state, U.S. ambassador to Germany (1993–1994), former chairman of the Asia Society, member of the Atlantic Council of the United States, counselor to the Council on Foreign Relations, founding chairman of the American Academy in Berlin
- Franklin Huddle (A.B. 1965) – U.S. ambassador to Tajikistan (2001–2003)
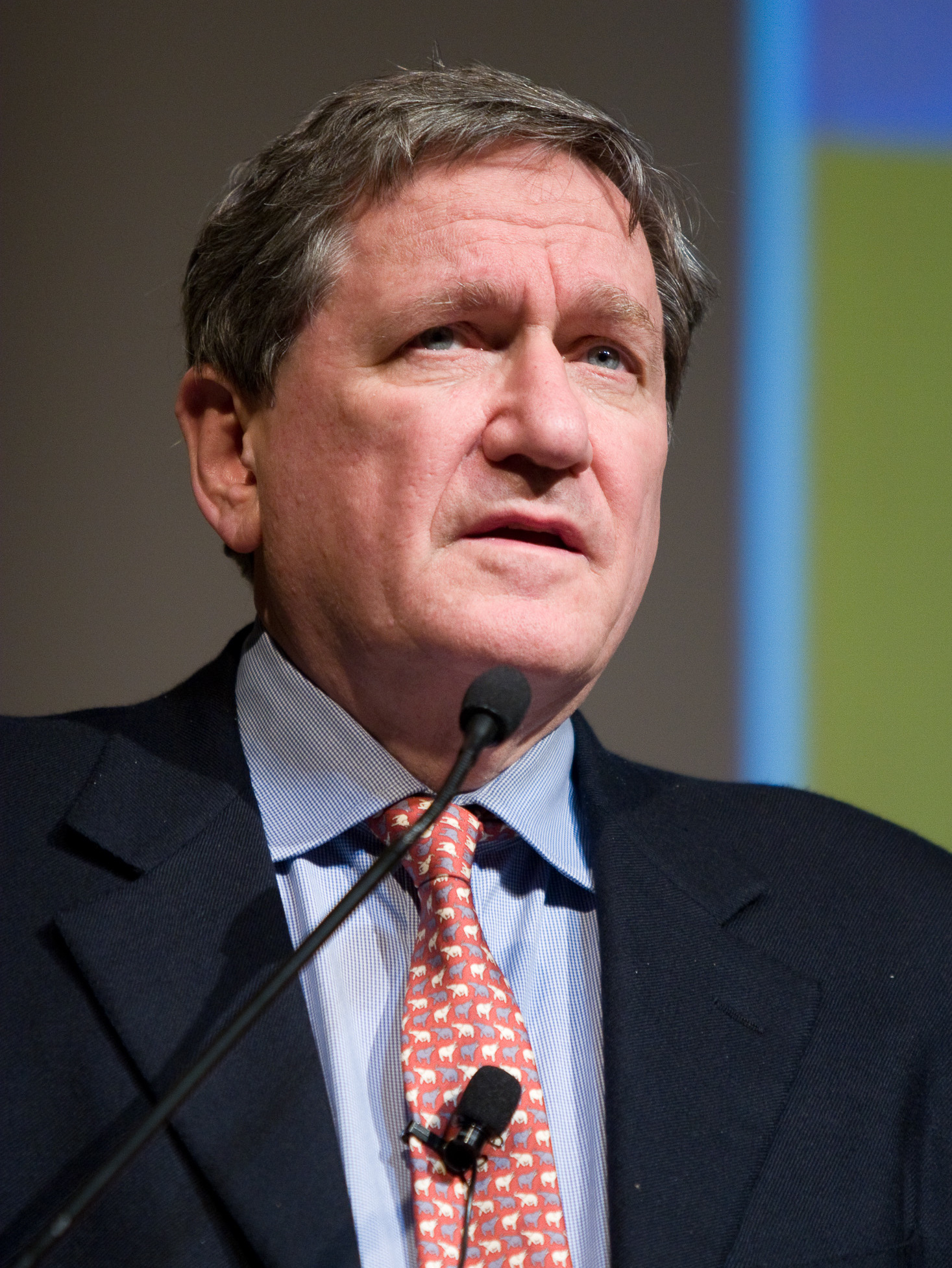
  Richard Holbrooke (1962)
- Charles Evans Hughes (A.B. 1881) – 44th U.S. secretary of state (1921–1925)
- Frederick Irving (A.B. 1943) – U.S. ambassador to Iceland (1972–1976) and Jamaica (1977–1978)
- Roberta S. Jacobson (A.B. 1982) – U.S. ambassador to Mexico (2016–2018)
- Noble Brandon Judah (1904) – U.S. ambassador to Cuba (1927–1929)
- Clinton E. Knox (A.M. 1931) – U.S. ambassador to Haiti (1969–1973)
- Edward G. Lanpher (A.B. 1965) – U.S. ambassador to Zimbabwe (1991–1995)
- Suzan G. LeVine (A.B. 1993) – U.S. ambassador to Switzerland and Lichtenstein (2014–2017)
- William L. Marcy (A.B. 1808) – 21st U.S. secretary of state (1853–1857), 20th United States secretary of war (1845–1849)
- Anthony Dryden Marshall (1950) – U.S. consul in Istanbul, 1958–59; U.S. ambassador to Malagasy Republic (1969–71), Trinidad and Tobago (1972–74), Kenya (1973–77), Seychelles (1976–77); theatrical producer; felon
- Virgil Maxcy (1804) – U.S. Chargé d'Affaires to Belgium (1837–1842)
- John M. McSweeney – U.S. ambassador to Bulgaria (1966–1970)
- Roderick W. Moore (A.B. 1986, A.M. 1987) – U.S. Ambassador to Montenegro (2007–2010) and acting U.S. ambassador to Bulgaria (2015)
- Adam Namm (A.B. 1985) – U.S. ambassador to Ecuador (2012–2015)
- James D. Nealon (A.B. 1980) – U.S. ambassador to Honduras (2014–2017)
- Victoria Nuland (A.B. 1983) – Under Secretary of State for Political Affairs (2021–2024), U.S. ambassador to NATO (2005–2008)

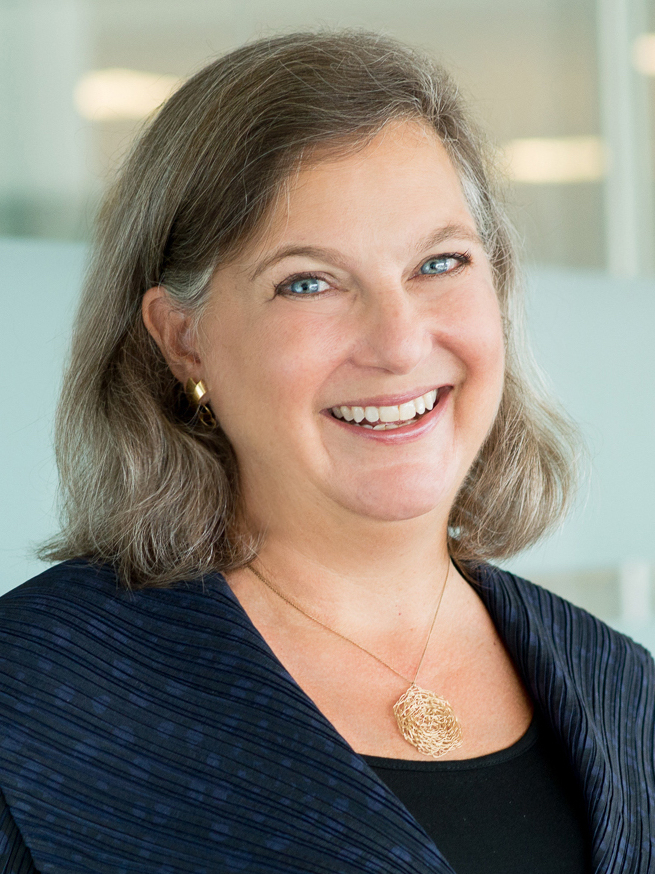
Victoria Nuland (1983)

- Richard Olson (A.B. 1981) – U.S. ambassador to the United Arab Emirates (2008–2011) and Pakistan (2012–2015)
- Richard Olney (A.B. 1856) – 34th U.S. Secretary of State (1895–1897), 40th United States Attorney General (1893–1895)
- Ely Palmer (A.B. 1907) – U.S. ambassador to Afghanistan (1948)
- Nit Phibunsongkhram (A.M. 1967) – Foreign Minister of Thailand (2006–2008), Thai Ambassador to the United States (1996–2000)
- David Pressman (A.B. 1999) – U.S. ambassador to the United Nations for Special Political Affairs (2014–2017), U.S. ambassador to Hungary (2022–2025), co-founder Not on Our Watch
- Jon Purnell (A.B. 1970) – U.S. ambassador to Uzbekistan (2003–2007)
- J. Meredith Read (A.M. 1866) – U.S. minister to Greece (1873–1879)
- L. Nicholas Ruwe (1955) – U.S. ambassador to Iceland (1985–1989)
- Frederic M. Sackett (A.B. 1890) – U.S. senator, Kentucky (1924–1930), U.S. ambassador to Germany (1930–1933)
- Richard Sneider – U.S. ambassador to South Korea (1974–1978)
- John J. Sullivan (A.B. 1981) – U.S. ambassador to Russia (2020–2022), U.S. Deputy Secretary of State (2017–2019), acting U.S. Secretary of State (2018)
- Stephanie S. Sullivan (A.B. 1980) – U.S. ambassador to Ghana (2019–2022), and Republic of the Congo (2013–2017)
- William H. Sullivan (A.B. 1943) – U.S. ambassador to Laos (1964–1969), the Philippines (1973–1977), and Iran (1977–1979)
- W. Stuart Symington (A.B. 1974) – U.S. ambassador to Nigeria (2016–2019) and Rwanda (2008–2011)
- William H. Twaddell (1963) – U.S. ambassador to Nigeria (1997–2000)
- Thomas J. Watson Jr. (A.B. 1937) – U.S. ambassador to the Soviet Union (1979–1981); 2nd president of IBM (1952–71); 11th national president of the Boy Scouts of America (1964–68); recipient of the 1964 Presidential Medal of Freedom
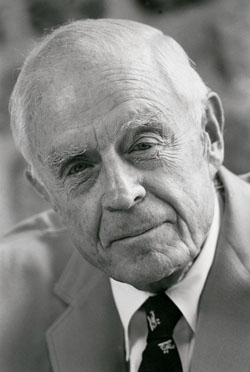
  Thomas J. Watson Jr. (1937)
- Henry Wheaton (A.B. 1802) – U.S. Minister to Denmark (1827–1835) and Prussia (1837–1846)
- Sharon P. Wilkinson (A.B. 1968) – U.S. ambassador to Burkina Faso (1996–1999) and Mozambique (2000–2003)
- Curtin Winsor Jr. (A.B. 1961) – U.S. ambassador to Costa Rica (1983–1985)

=== Advisors and officials ===
- John A. Bolles (A.B. 1829, A.M. 1832) – 8th secretary of the Commonwealth of Massachusetts
- Kate Brandt (A.B. 2007) – 1st American chief sustainability officer
- Nicholas Brown III (1811) – lieutenant governor of Rhode Island
- Nathaniel Bullock (1798) – lieutenant governor of Rhode Island
- Charles "Chuck" Colson (1953) – chief counsel to Richard Nixon (1969–1973); figured in the Watergate Scandal; founder of Prison Fellowship
- James G. Connolly (1909) – lieutenant governor of Rhode Island
- Kate R. Cook (A.B. 1998) – chief of staff to the governor of Massachusetts (2023–present); acting Massachusetts Attorney General (2023)
- Thomas Corcoran (1922) – member of President Franklin Roosevelt's "brain trust"; guided New Deal legislation; high-powered Washington lobbyist
- Tad Devine (A.B. 1978) – political consultant, senior adviser in Al Gore's 2000 and John Kerry's 2004 Presidential campaigns, chief strategist for Bernie Sanders' 2016 presidential campaign
- Thomas R. DiLuglio (1953) – lieutenant governor of Rhode Island
- David F. Duncan (1995) – domestic policy advisor to Bill Clinton and Hillary Clinton; co-originator of the self-medication hypothesis of drug addiction
- Rochelle Mercedes Garza (A.B. 2007) – chief, United States Commission on Civil Rights
- William Greene (1817) – lieutenant governor of Rhode Island
- Benjamin F. Hallett (1816) – 1st chair of the Democratic National Committee; United States attorney for the District of Massachusetts
- John Hay (1858) – U.S. secretary of state under presidents William McKinley and Theodore Roosevelt (1898–1905), private secretary and assistant to Abraham Lincoln

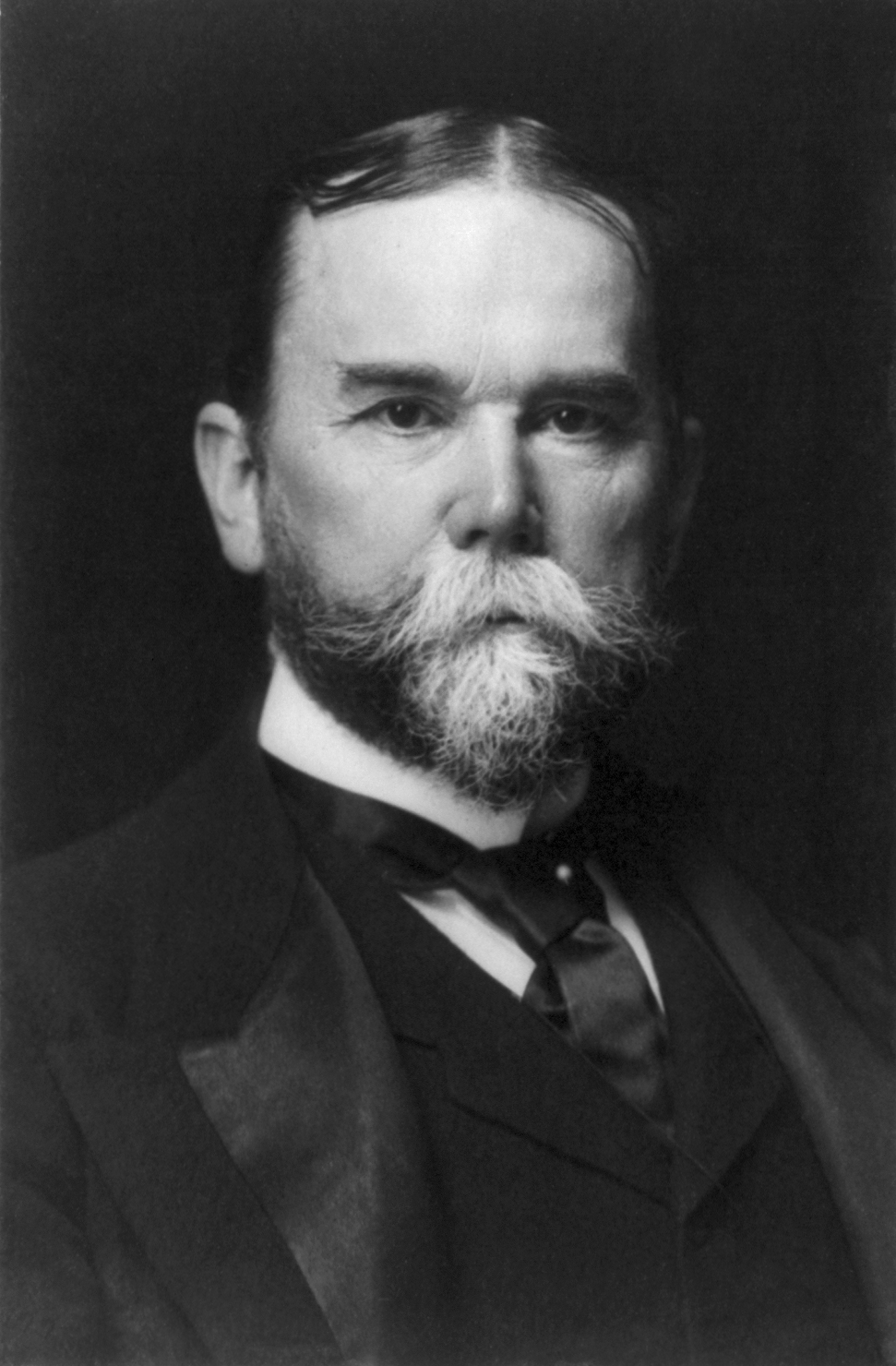
John Hay (1858)

- Charles Hill (A.B. 1957) – senior lecturer in the Humanities, Brady-Johnson Distinguished Fellow in Grand Strategy, Yale University; former executive aid to former U.S. Secretary of State George P. Shultz; research fellow, Hoover Institution
- E. Howard Hunt (1940) – author, OSS & CIA officer, worked under President Richard Nixon; figured in the Watergate scandal
- Randall Kroszner (A.B. 1984) – member of the Board of Governors of the Federal Reserve System
- Barbara Leonard (A.B. 1946) – 23rd Secretary of State of Rhode Island
- Emmy Liss (B.A. 2011) - Director of the New York City Office of Child Care
- Ira Magaziner (1969) – Clinton advisor, current chairman of Clinton AIDS Initiative; co-instigator of Brown's New Curriculum
- Seema Nanda (1992) – United States Solicitor of Labor, CEO of the Democratic National Convention
- Annette Nazareth (A.B. 1979) – former Securities and Exchange commissioner, partner at Davis Polk & Wardell
- Richard Olney (1856) – United States attorney general (1893–1895), United States secretary of state (1895–1897)
- Thomas Perez (A.B. 1983) – chair of the Democratic National Committee, former United States Secretary of Labor (2013–2017)

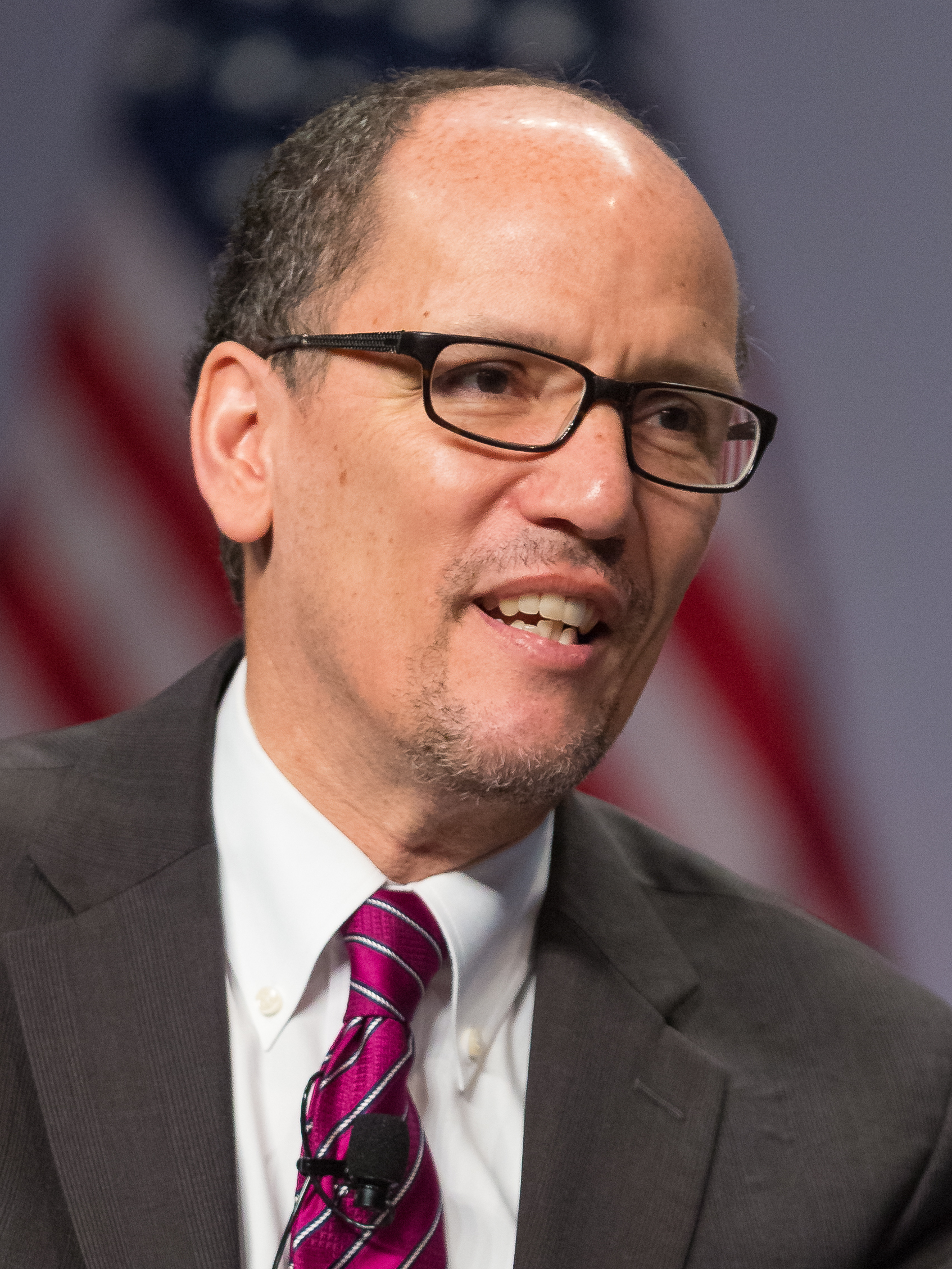
Thomas Perez (1983)

- Elizabeth H. Roberts (1978) – lieutenant governor of Rhode Island
- Elisse B. Walter (Class of 1971) – 30th chair of the Securities and Exchange Commission
- Joseph Ward (1865) – leader in the movement for South Dakota statehood
- Tahesha Way (A.B. 1993) – secretary of state of New Jersey (2018–2023), lieutenant governor of New Jersey (2023–)
- Janet Yellen (A.B. 1967) – United States secretary of the treasury, former chair of the Federal Reserve, former president of the Federal Reserve Bank of San Francisco; Trefethen Professor of Business Administration and professor of Economics, University of California, Berkeley

=== International politicians ===
- Junaid Ahmad (A.B.) – Bangladeshi economist, World Bank country director for India
- Silas Alward (A.M. 1871) – member of Legislative Assembly of New Brunswick (1887–1899)
- Pang Chien-kuo (A.M. 1984, Ph.D. 1988) – member of Legislative Yuan (2002–2005)
- Laura E. Flores (A.B. 1990) – permanent representative of Panama to the United Nations
- Ichirō Fujisaki – Japanese ambassador to the United States (2008–12), Japanese ambassador to the United Nations, chairman of the Executive Committee of the UN High Commissioner for Refugees (1995–99)
- James Gillies (A.M. 1949) – member of Parliament of Canada representing Don Valley (1972–1979)
- Shigeyuki Goto (A.M. 1984) – Minister of Health, Labour and Welfare of Japan (2021–present)
- Martín Guzmán (Ph.D. 2013) – Minister of Economy of Argentina (2019–2022)
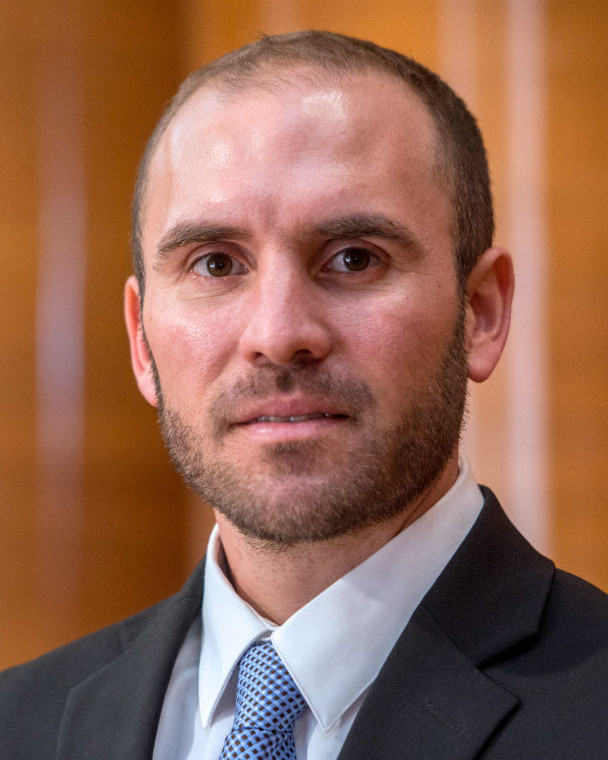
  Martín Guzmán (2013)
- Aeneas Mackay, 15th Lord Reay – Scottish lord, member of the House of Lords Excepted Hereditary (2019–present)
- Nadiem Makarim (2006) – Minister of Education and Culture of Indonesia (2021–present)
- Eduardo Montealegre (Sc.B. 1976) – Nicaraguan politician, deputy to the National Assembly, Minister of Foreign Affairs
- Nitya Pibulsonggram (A.M. 1967) – Minister of Foreign Affairs of Thailand (2006–2008)
- Uttama Savanayana (Sc.B. 1982) – former Minister of Finance (2019–2020), Industry (2016–2018), and Digital Economy and Society of Thailand (2015–2016)
- Tarek Shawki (MSc 1983, MSc 1985, Ph.D. 1985) – Minister of Education and Technical Education of Egypt
- Ijyaraj Singh (Sc.B. 1987) – Indian politician, Member of the Lok Sabha representing Kota (2009–2014)
- Kenneth Tiong (Sc.B. 2014) – member of Parliament of Singapore representing the Serangoon Division of Aljunied Group Representation Constituency
- Henry Tufnell (A.B. 2015) – Welsh politician, Member of Parliament for Mid and South Pembrokeshire

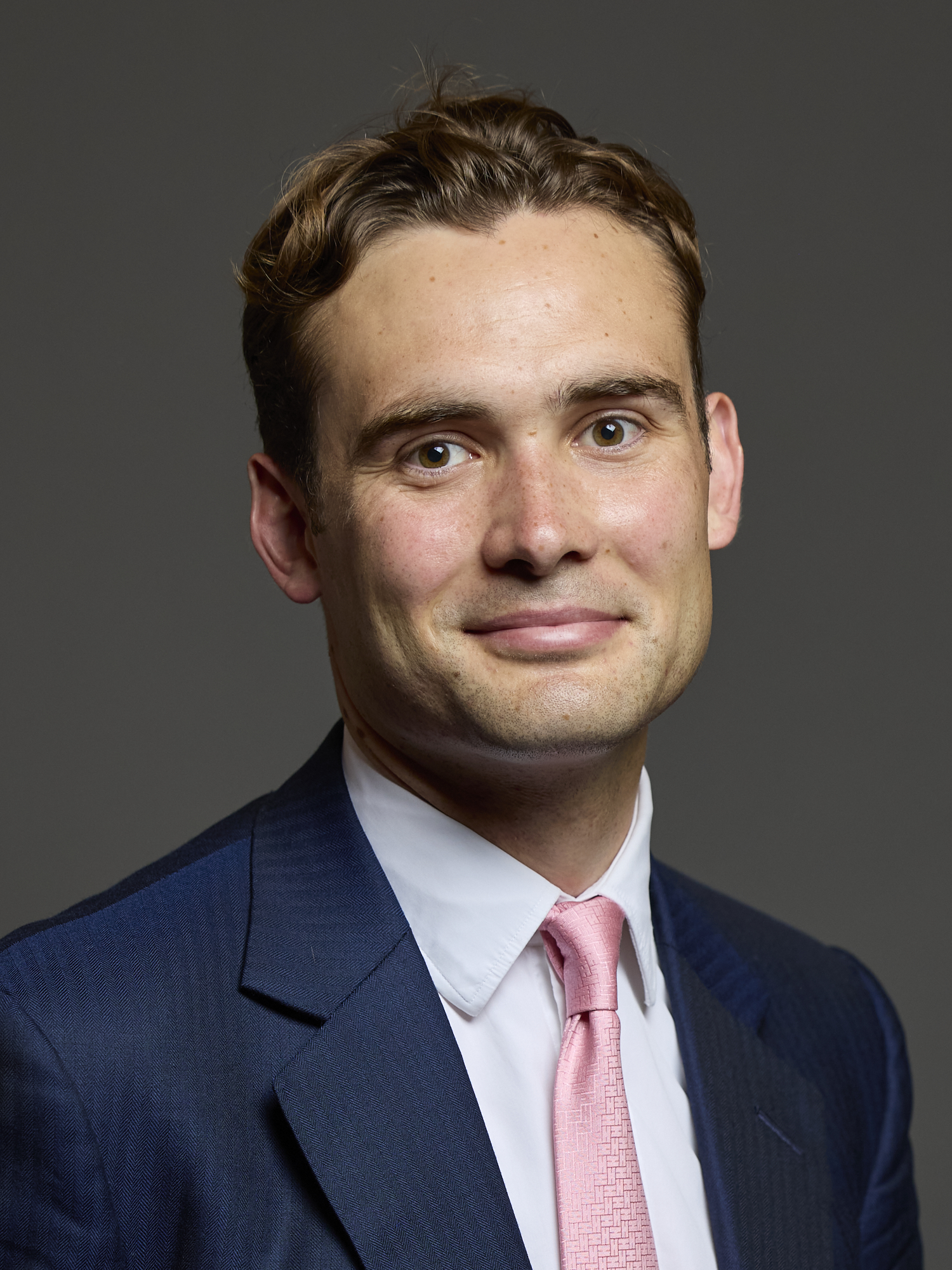
Henry Tufnell (2015)

- Julio Velarde (M.A. 1977, Ph.D. 1978) – chairman of the Central Reserve Bank of Peru (2006–present)

=== Activists, reformers, and thought leaders ===
- Junaid Ahmad (A.B. 1983) – economist; World Bank country director for India
- Benjamin Boas (A.B. 2007) – Cool Japan ambassador to the Cabinet Office of Japan and cultural consultant
- John Bonifaz (1987) – founder, National Voting Rights Institute, recipient of the MacArthur Fellowship
- Geoffrey Bowers – plaintiff an early HIV/AIDS discrimination case
- Katherine Chon (Sc.B. 2002) – co-founder and board president of anti-human trafficking non-profit Polaris Project
- Bhupendranath Datta (M.A. 1914) – Indian revolutionary, sociologist and anthropologist
- Sean Eldridge (A.B. 2009) – political activist and former congressional candidate
- Derek Ellerman (Sc.B. 2002) – co-founder and board chairman of anti-human trafficking non-profit Polaris Project, former Ashoka fellow and current Ashoka ambassador
- John Dix Fisher (1820) – founder of the Perkins Institution for the Blind, the first school for the blind established in the U.S.
- Kathryn S. Fuller (A.B. 1968) – chairman of the board, Ford Foundation; former president and CEO of non-governmental organization World Wildlife Fund – U.S. (1989–2005)
- Samuel Gridley Howe (1821) – prominent physician, abolitionist, advocate of education for the blind
- Gene Karpinski (1974) – president, League of Conservation Voters
- Kerry Kennedy (A.B. 1981) – activist, writer; president of Robert F. Kennedy Human Rights; former wife of New York Governor Andrew Cuomo; daughter of Robert F. Kennedy
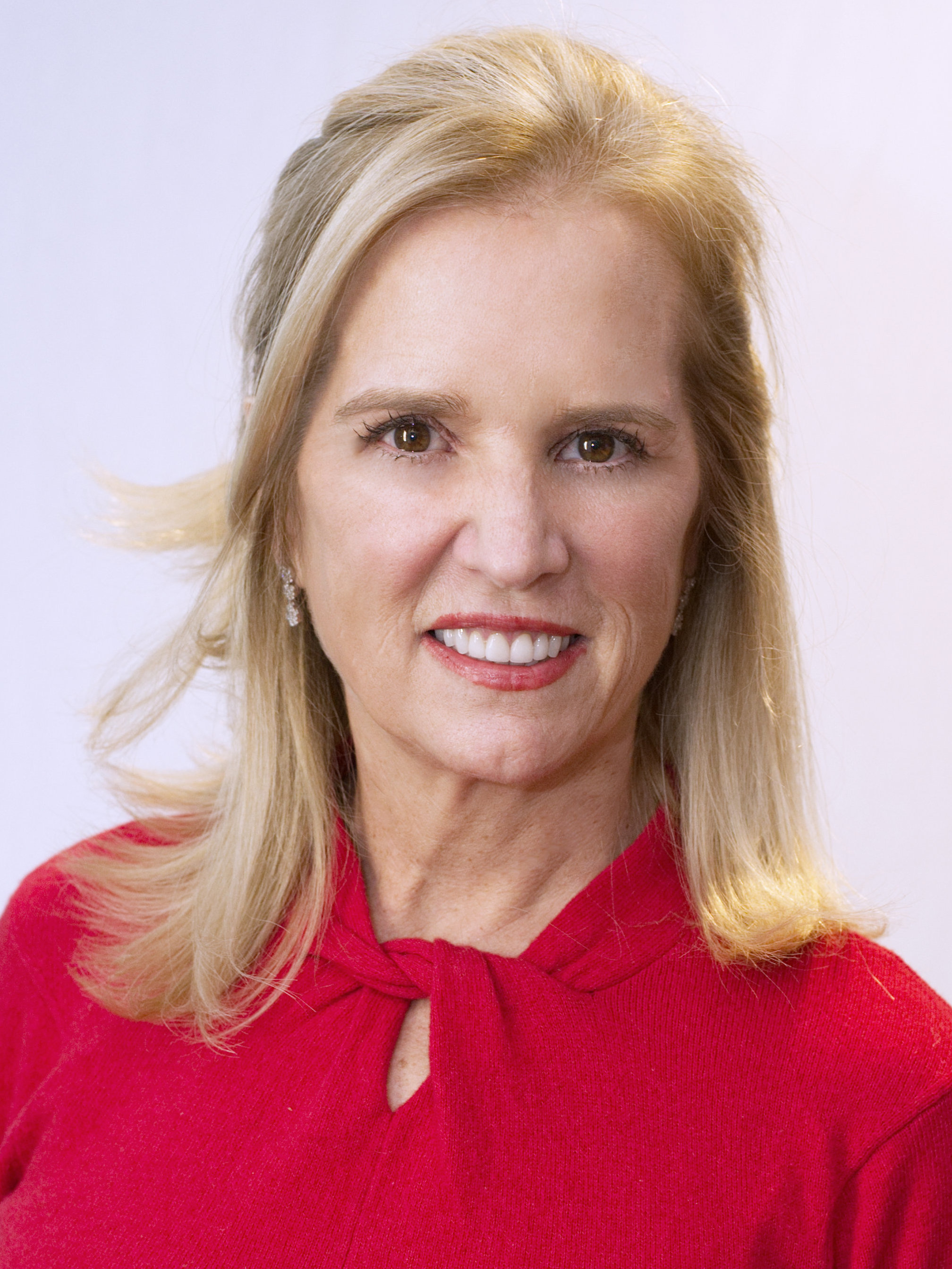
  Kerry Kennedy (1981)
- Maya Keyes – anarchist and gay rights activist
- Alfie Kohn (A.B. 1979) – proponent of progressive education
- Nancy Lublin (1993) – founder of Crisis Text Line
- Horace Mann (A.B. 1819) – educationist; father of American public school education
- Nancy Northup (A.B. 1981) – president, Center for Reproductive Rights
- Nawal M. Nour (A.B. 1988) – physician, founder of the first hospital center in the United States devoted to the medical needs of African women who have undergone FGM, recipient of the MacArthur Fellowship
- Michael Parenti (A.M. 1957) – political scientist, social critic, and author

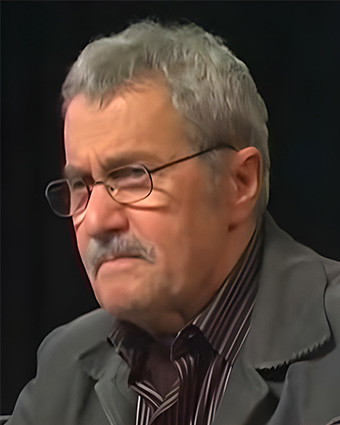
Michael Parenti

- Jesselyn Radack (A.B. 1992) – national security and human rights attorney
- Cecile Richards (1980) – president, Planned Parenthood Federation of America
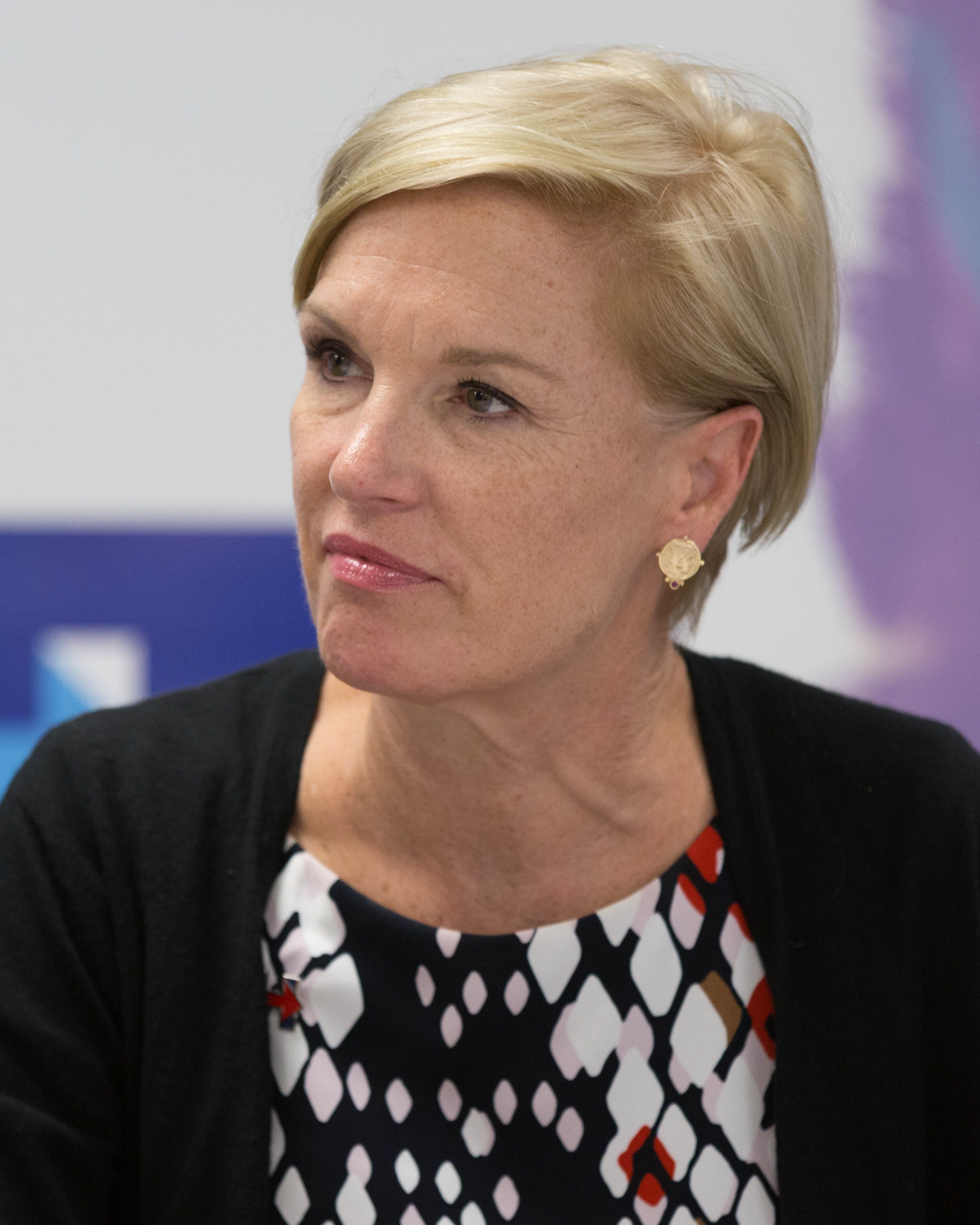
  Cecile Richards (1980)
- George Lincoln Rockwell (Class of 1942) – founder of the American Nazi Party; dropped out after second year to join the Navy
- Kenneth Roth (A.B. 1978) – executive director of Human Rights Watch (1993–2022)
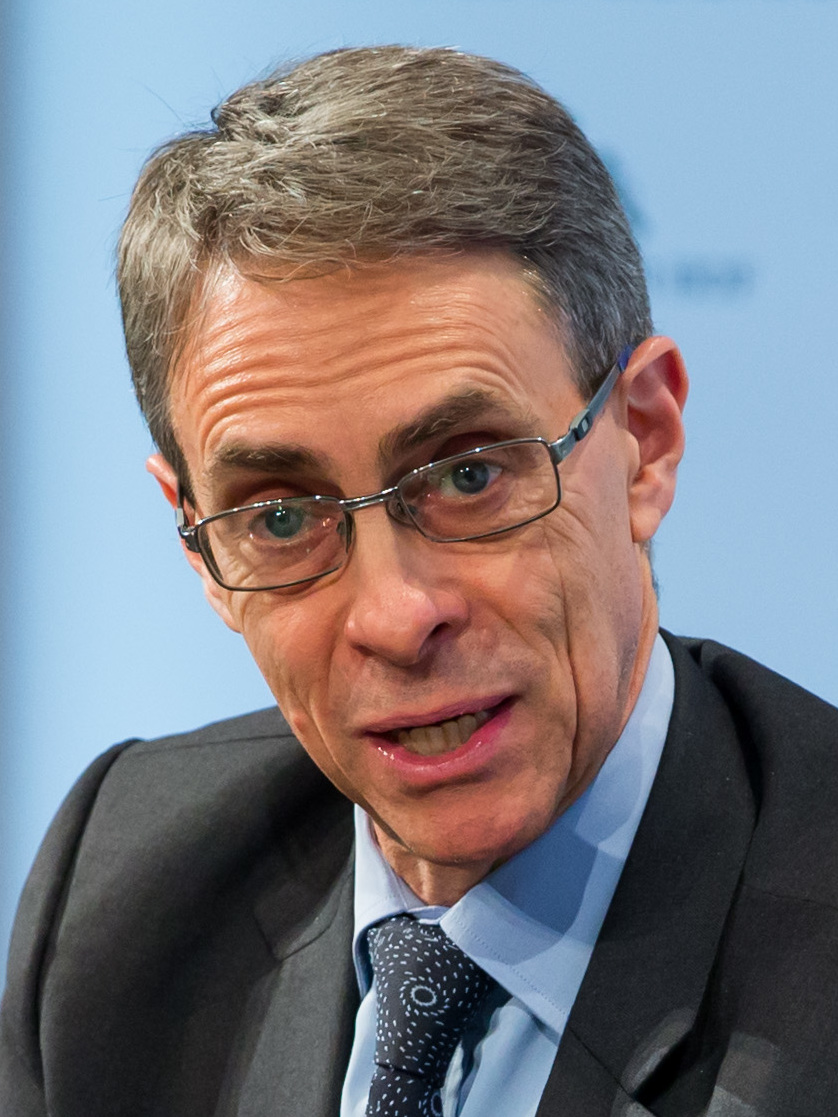
  Kenneth Roth (1978)
- Malika Saada Saar (A.B. 1992) – director of the Human Rights Project for Girls; co-founder of Rebecca Project for Human Rights
- Rinku Sen (A.B. 1988) – co-president of the Women's March board of directors, former executive director of Race Forward
- Martha Sharp (A.B. 1926) – Unitarian who aided hundreds of Jews in escaping the Holocaust
- Michael Soussan (A.B. 1996) – whistleblower and author
- Irving Stowe (A.B. 1936) – founder of Greenpeace
- Adam Werbach (A.B. 1995) – president, Sierra Club

=== Jurists and attorneys ===
==== State supreme court justices ====
- Asa Aldis (A.B. 1796) – chief justice of the Vermont Supreme Court
- Samuel Ames (1823) – chief justice of the Rhode Island Supreme Court (1856–1865)
- Peleg Arnold (A.B.) – chief justice of the Rhode Island Supreme Court from 1795 to 1812; represented Rhode Island as a delegate to the Continental Congress in the 1787–1788 session; incorporator of the Providence Society for the Abolition of Slavery in 1790
- Chester W. Barrows (1895) – justice, Rhode Island Supreme Court
- Theodore R. Boehm (A.B. 1960) – justice, Supreme Court of Indiana
- Alfred Bosworth (1835) – justice, Rhode Island Supreme Court (1854–1862)
- John P. Bourcier (1950) – justice, Rhode Island Supreme Court (1995–2002)
- Charles S. Bradley (A.B. 1838) – chief justice, Rhode Island Supreme Court (1866–1868)
- George A. Brayton (1824) – chief justice, Rhode Island Supreme Court (1868–1874)
- Allyn L. Brown (1905) – chief justice, Connecticut Supreme Court
- Franklin J. Dickman (1846) – judge, Supreme Court of Ohio
- Norman S. Dike (Ph.B. 1887) – judge, New York Supreme Court
- Luke Drury (1813) – judge, Rhode Island Supreme Court
- Job Durfee (A.B. 1813) – chief justice, Rhode Island Supreme Court
- Thomas Durfee (1846) – chief justice, Rhode Island Supreme Court
- Samuel Eddy (1787) – U.S. congressman, Rhode Island (1819–1825), chief justice, Rhode Island Supreme Court (1827–1835)
- Carmen E. Espinosa (A.M. 1973) – senior judge, Connecticut Supreme Court
- Charles E. Forbes (1815) – judge, Massachusetts Supreme Judicial Court
- C. G. W. French (1842) – chief justice, Arizona Territorial Supreme Court
- Richard Ward Greene (1812) – chief justice, Rhode Island Supreme Court; United States Attorney for the District of Rhode Island
- Levi Haile (1821) – judge, Rhode Island Supreme Court
- Clarke Howard Johnson (1877) – chief justice, Rhode Island Supreme Court
- Alfred H. Joslin (A.B. 1936) – justice, Rhode Island Supreme Court (1963–1979)
- Victoria Lederberg (Ph.D. 1966) – judge, Rhode Island Supreme Court (1993–2002)
- Charles Matteson (A.B. 1861) – chief justice, Rhode Island Supreme Court (1891–1900)
- Lewis Linn McArthur – justice, Oregon Supreme Court
- Theron Metcalf (A.B. 1805) – justice, Massachusetts Supreme Judicial Court
- Marcus Morton (1838) – chief justice, Massachusetts Supreme Judicial Court (1882–1890)
- James Madison Morton Sr. (1859) – judge, Massachusetts Supreme Judicial Court
- William W. Moss (1891) – judge, Rhode Island Supreme Court
- John S. Murdock (1896) – judge, Rhode Island Supreme Court
- Thomas J. Paolino – judge, Rhode Island Supreme Court
- Christopher F. Parkhurst (1876) – chief judge, Rhode Island Supreme Court
- Charles Ray (Class of 1852) – judge, Indiana Supreme Court
- Solomon Sibley (A.B. 1794) – chief justice, Michigan Supreme Court; first United States Attorney for the Michigan Territory; territorial delegate to Congress
- William R. Staples (1817) – chief judge, Rhode Island Supreme Court
- Julie J. Vargas (A.B. 1990) – judge, New Mexico Supreme Court
- Henry L. Warren – chief judge, Montana Territorial Supreme Court
- Joseph R. Weisberger (1947) – chief judge, Rhode Island Supreme Court

==== State attorneys general ====
- Margery Bronster (A.B. 1979) – 10th attorney general of Hawaii
- Robert W. Burbank (1878) – 49th attorney general of Rhode Island
- Kate R. Cook (A.B. 1998) – acting attorney general of Massachusetts (2023); chief of staff to the Governor of Massachusetts (2023–present)
- Herbert F. DeSimone (A.B. 1910) – 64th attorney general of Rhode Island and assistant secretary of transportation
- John Patrick Hartigan (A.B. 1951) – 59th attorney general of Rhode Island (1933–1939); judge, United States District Court for the District of Rhode Island (1940–1951); judge, United States Court of Appeals for the First Circuit (1951–1968)
- David Howell (A.M. 1769) – 41st attorney general of Rhode Island; judge, United States District Court for the District of Rhode Island (1812–1824)
- Richard J. Israel (A.B.) – 65th attorney general of Rhode Island
- George V. N. Lothrop (1838) – 7th attorney general of Michigan; U.S. Ambassador to Russia (1885–1888)
- Patrick C. Lynch (1987) – 72nd attorney general of Rhode Island
- Benjamin M. McLyman (1913) – 58th attorney general of Rhode Island
- Julius C. Michaelson (A.M. 1967) – 66th attorney general of Rhode Island
- Dennise Longo Quiñones (A.B. 1989) – secretary of justice of Puerto Rico
- William Tong (A.B. 1995) – 25th attorney general of Connecticut (2019–present)

==== United States district court judges ====
- Francisco Besosa (A.B. 1971) – senior judge, U.S. District Court for the District of Puerto Rico
- Terrence Boyle (A.B. 1967) – chief justice, United States District Court for the Eastern District of North Carolina
- Arthur Lewis Brown (A.B. 1876) – judge, United States District Court for the District of Rhode Island
- A. Richard Caputo (A.B. 1960) – senior judge, United States District Court for the Middle District of Pennsylvania
- George Moulton Carpenter (A.B. 1864) – judge, United States District Court for the District of Rhode Island
- Robert Chatigny (A.B. 1973) – chief judge, United States District Court for the District of Connecticut
- Edward William Day (A.B. 1922) – chief judge, United States District Court for the District of Rhode Island
- Leslie Abrams Gardner (A.B. 1997) – chief judge, United States District Court for the Middle District of Georgia
- John Power Knowles (A.B. 1836) – judge, United States District Court for the District of Rhode Island
- John Christopher Mahoney (A.B. 1905) – judge, United States District Court for the District of Rhode Island; Senior Judge, United States Court of Appeals for the First Circuit
- John J. McConnell Jr. (A.B. 1980) – chief judge, United States District Court for the District of Rhode Island
- Edmund A. Sargus Jr. (A.B. 1975) – chief judge, United States District Court for the Southern District of Ohio
- Robert N. Scola Jr. (A.B. 1977) – senior judge, United States District Court for the Southern District of Florida
- Matthias B. Tallmadge (A.M. 1798) – judge, United States District Court for the Northern District of New York
- Joseph L. Tauro (A.B. 1953) – chief judge, United States District Court for the District of Massachusetts
- Anne Rachel Traum (A.B. 1991) – judge, United States District Court for the District of Nevada

==== Other federal legal officials ====
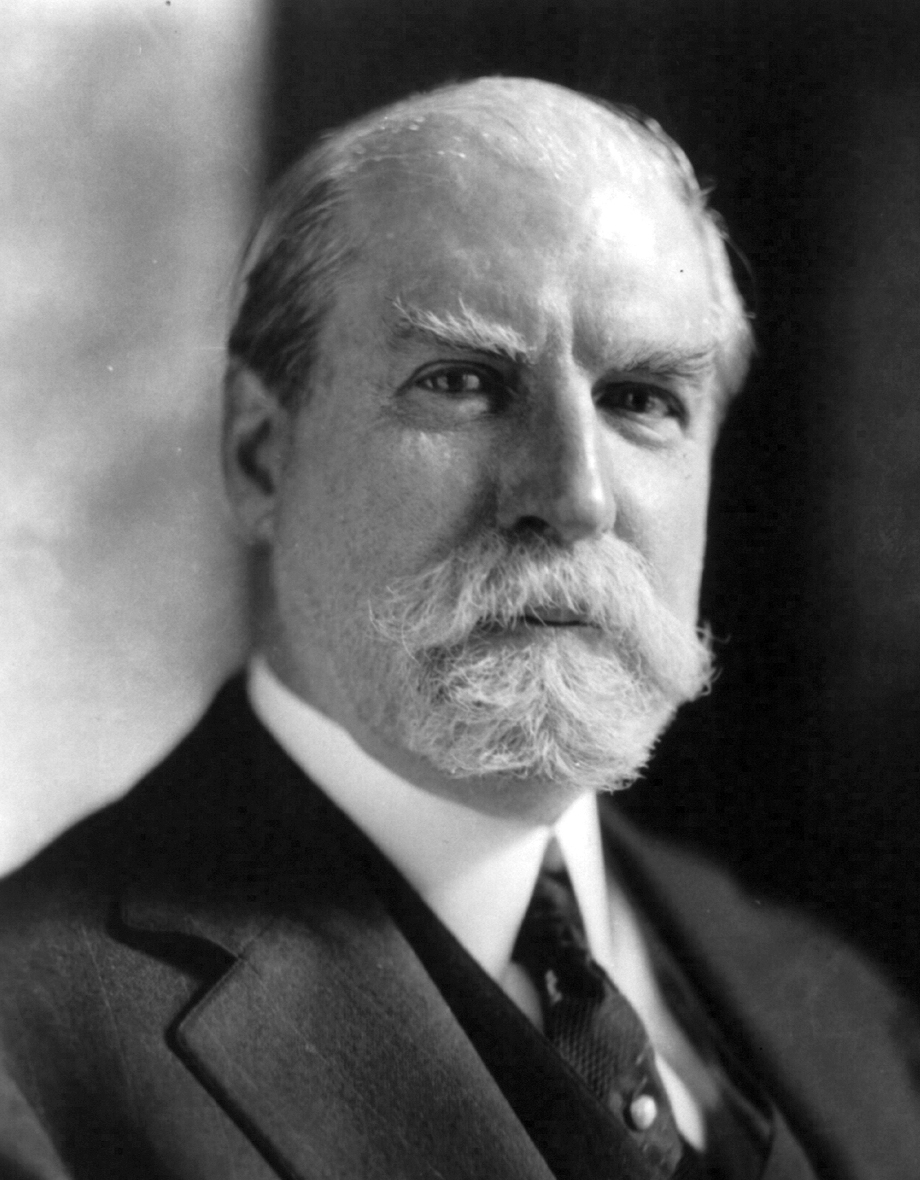
Charles Evans Hughes (1881)

- Jeffrey Arbeit (A.B. 2005) – judge, United States Tax Court
- Zachary A. Cunha (A.B. 1998) – United States attorney for the District of Rhode Island
- Israel Hamilton – United States attorney for the District of Ohio
- Richard Hertling (A.B. 1982) – judge, United States Court of Federal Claims
- Dwight Holton (A.B. 1987) – United States attorney for the District of Oregon
- Charles Evans Hughes (A.B. 1881) – 11th chief justice of the United States (1930–1941); governor of New York (1907–1910); U.S. secretary of state (1921–1925)
- Charles Evans Hughes Jr. (A.B. 1909) – 20th United States solicitor general; son of Charles Evans Hughes
- Charles F. Lettow (A.M. 2001) – senior judge, United States Court of Federal Claims
- Joshua S. Levy (A.B. 1987) – United States attorney for the District of Massachusetts
- Richard Olney (1856) – 40th United States attorney general (1893–1895), 34th United States Secretary of State (1895–1897)
- Thomas J. Perrelli (A.B. 1988) – United States associate attorney general
- John A. Rizzo (A.B. 1969) – acting general counsel of the Central Intelligence Agency; noted for his role in "laying the legal groundwork" for the war on terror

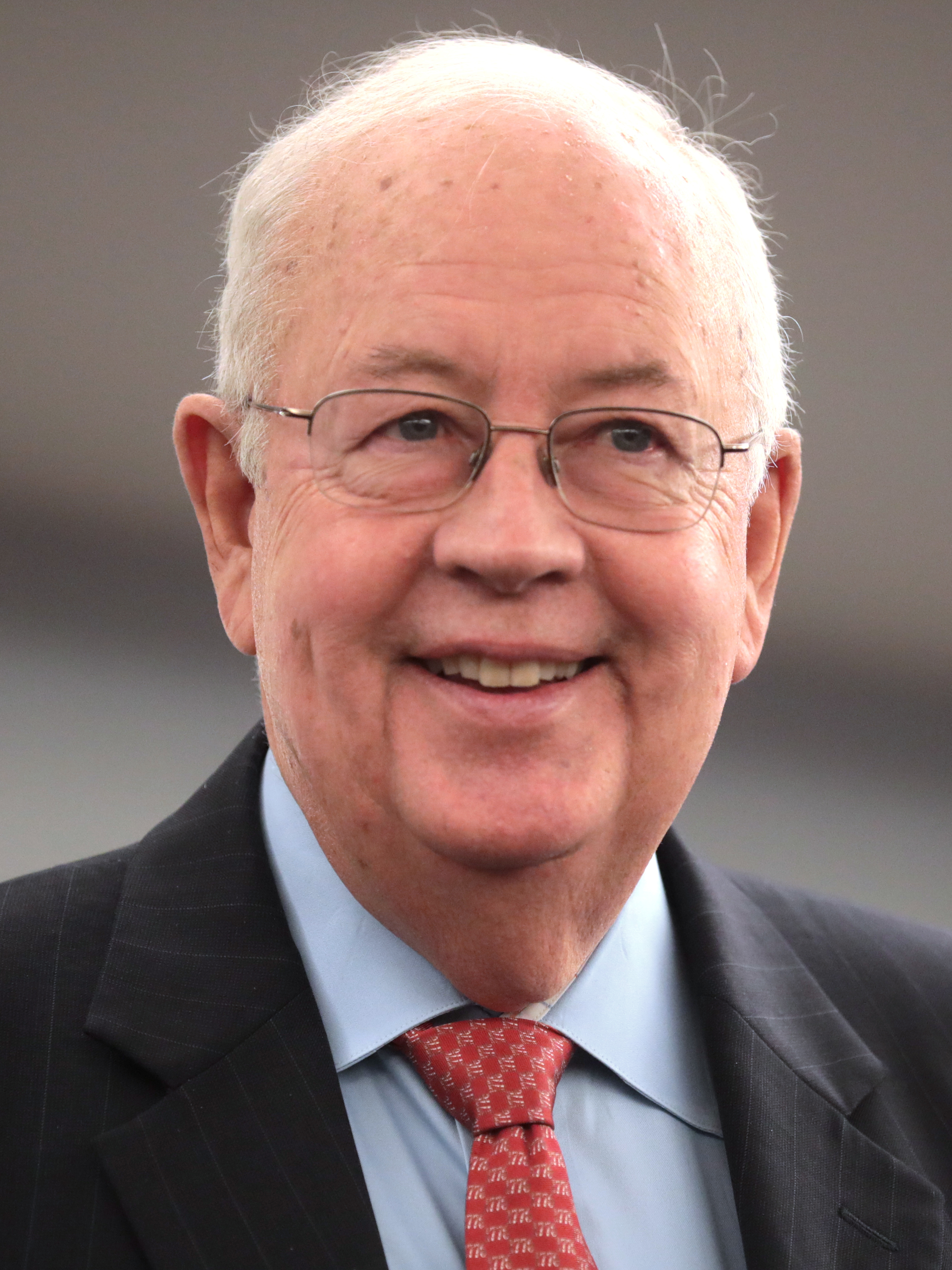
Kenneth Starr (1969)

- Lafe Solomon (A.B. 1970) – acting general counsel of the National Labor Relations Board
- Kenneth Starr (M.A. 1969) – 39th United States solicitor general; former U.S. appeals court judge; special counsel in Bill Clinton impeachment proceedings and namesake of the Starr Report; president of Baylor University
- Theodore Tannenwald Jr. (A.B. 1936) – judge, United States Tax Court
- Norman O. Tietjens (Ph.B. 1925, M.A. 1927) – judge, United States Tax Court
- Ojetta Rogeriee Thompson (A.B. 1973) – judge, United States Court of Appeals for the First Circuit; Judge, Rhode Island Superior Court
- Charles H. Turner (A.B. 1958) – United States attorney for the District of Oregon

==== Other legal officials ====
- Haiganush R. Bedrosian (A.B. 1965) – chief justice, Rhode Island Family Court
- Michael A. Cardozo (A.B. 1963) – 77th corporation counsel of New York City
- Jeremy Feigenbaum (A.B. 2011) – 1st solicitor general of New Jersey
- George Edward Chalmer Hayes (1915) – lead attorney in Bolling v. Sharpe, the companion case to Brown v. Board of Education
- Nathan Hochman (A.B. 1985) – attorney, district attorney of Los Angeles County (2024–), United States assistant attorney general for the Tax Division (2008–2009)
- William M. Jackson (A.B. 1975) – judge, Superior Court of the District of Columbia
- Joseph B. Keenan (1910) – chief prosecutor, International Military Tribunal for the Far East; United States Assistant Attorney General, Criminal Division
- Lynn Leibovitz (A.B. 1981) – judge, Superior Court of the District of Columbia
- Michael Newdow (Sc.B. 1974) – atheist doctor and lawyer who unsuccessfully argued Elk Grove Unified School District v. Newdow before the U.S. Supreme Court
- Theodore R. Newman Jr. (A.B. 1955) – chief judge, District of Columbia Court of Appeals
- Louis L. Redding (A.B. 1923) – first Black lawyer in Delaware, successfully litigated Gebhart v. Belton, which was upheld in Brown v. Board of Education
- Robert A. Salerno (A.B. 1983) – judge, Superior Court of the District of Columbia
- Michael A. Silverstein (A.B. 1956) – judge, Rhode Island Superior Court
- Craig Waters (A.B. 1979) – communications counsel to the Florida Supreme Court

== Business ==
- Lawrence D. Ackman (1960) – real estate entrepreneur, father of billionaire Bill Ackman
- Damola Adamolekun (A.B. 2011) – CEO of P. F. Chang's (2020–2023), CEO of Red Lobster (2024–present)
- Giovanni Alberto Agnelli (1986) – heir apparent and designated future chairman of the Fiat group
- Everett M. Arnold (A.B. 1921) – founder of Quality Comics
- George S. Barrett (A.B. 1977) – CEO of Cardinal Health (2009–2017)
- John Berylson (A.B. 1975) – investor
- Marvin Bower (Sc.B. 1925) – co-founder of McKinsey & Company
- Aneel Bhusri (Sc.B. 1988) – billionaire, co-founder and CEO of Workday
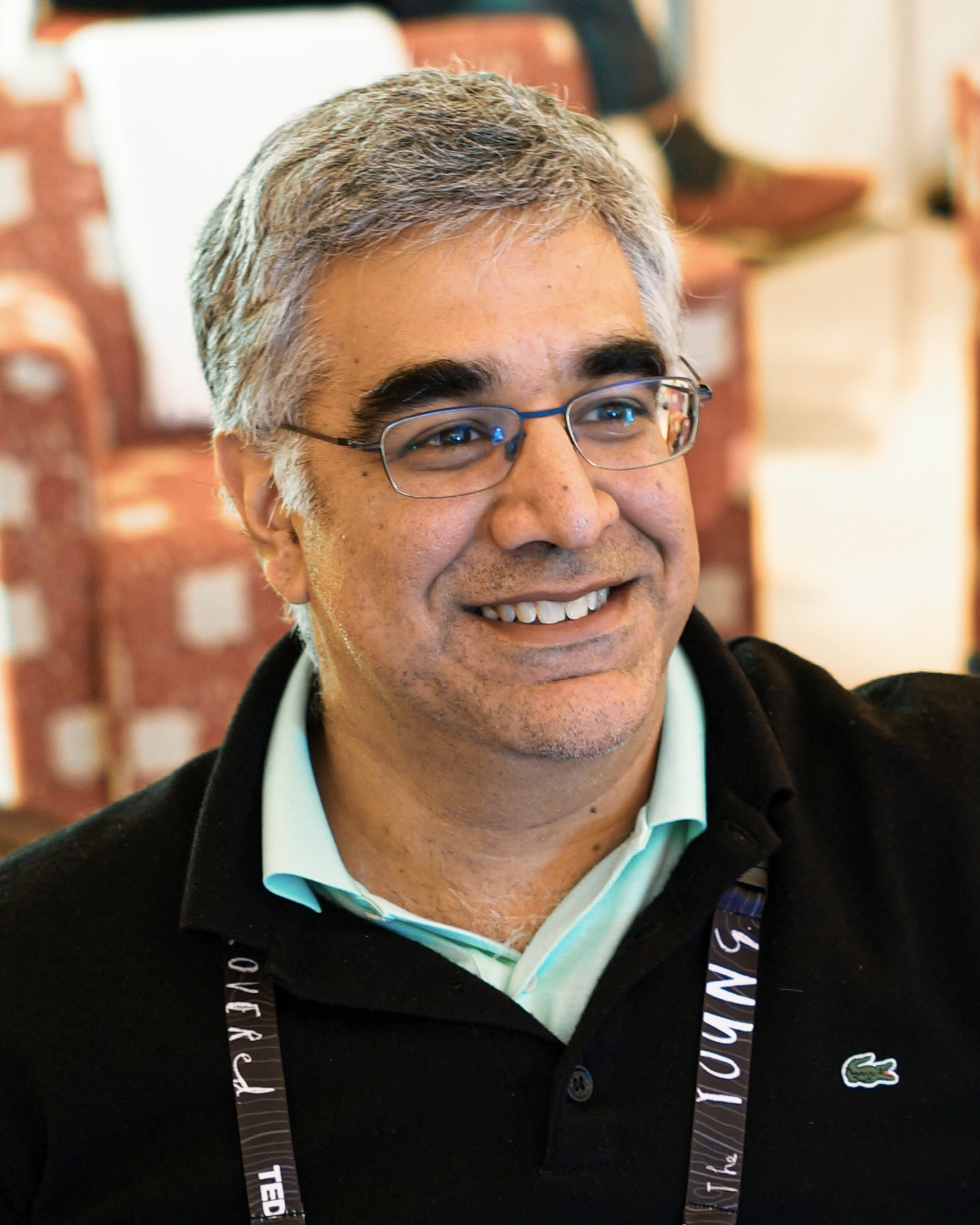
  Aneel Bhusri (1988)
- Alfred S. Bloomingdale (1938) – co-founder and President, Diners Club International
- Orlando Bravo (1970) – first Puerto Rican billionaire businessman
- Harry G. Broadman (A.B. 1977) – international investment executive
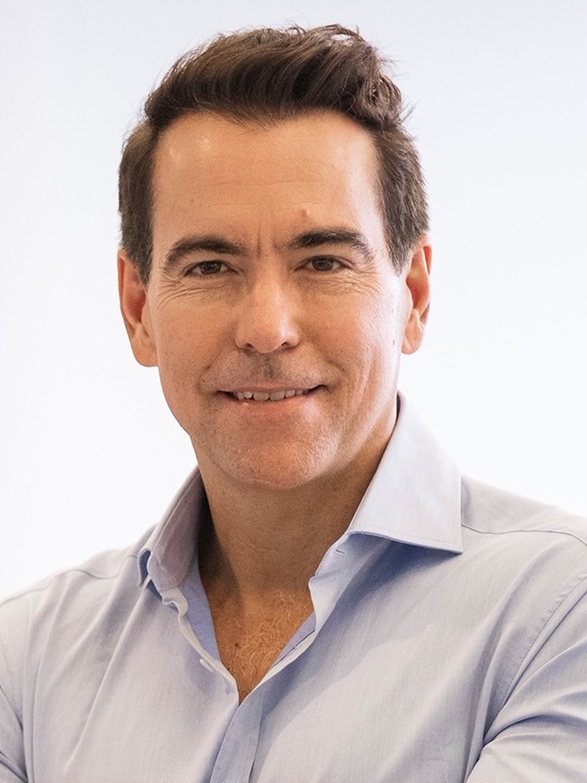
  Orlando Bravo (1970)
- Willard C. Butcher (1948) – former chairman and CEO, Chase Manhattan Bank
- Adam Cahan (A.B. 1993) – former senior vice president of Mobile and Emerging Products, Yahoo!
- Arthur L. Carter (1953) – investor, namesake of the Arthur L. Carter Journalism Institute at New York University
- Lisa Caputo (A.B. 1986) – chief marketing officer, Citigroup
- Finn M. W. Caspersen (A.B. 1963) – financier, chairman and chief executive of the Beneficial Corporation
- John S. Chen (Sc.B. 1978) – chairman and CEO of BlackBerry Limited
- Chung Yong-jin (A.B. 1994) – South Korean billionaire, vice chairman and CEO of Shinsegae Group
- Glenn Creamer (A.B. 1984) – billionaire, Senior managing director of Providence Equity Partners
- Dan DiMicco (BSc 1972) – CEO (2000–12) and chairman (2006–12) of Nucor
- Tanya Dubash (A.B. 1991) – Indian businesswoman
- David Ebersman (A.B. 1991) – former chief financial officer of Facebook, Inc.; founder, Lyra Health
- Donna M. Fernandes (Sc.B 1981) – president and CEO, Buffalo Zoo 2000–2017
- Dylan Field (Class of 2013½) – founder and CEO of Figma
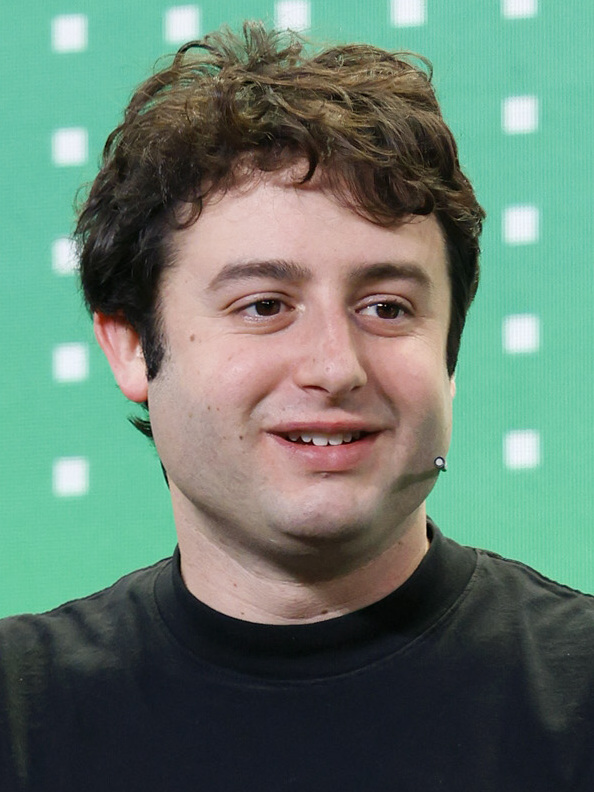
  Dylan Field
- Devin Finzer (BSc 2013) – billionaire, CEO and co-founder of OpenSea
- George M. C. Fisher (Sc. M. 1964, Ph.D. 1966) – former CEO of Motorola and Eastman Kodak Company
- Alan H. Fishman (A.B. 1967) – CEO of Washington Mutual
- Sidney Frank (Class of 1942) – billionaire founder of Grey Goose and Jägermeister
- Tom Gardner (A.B. 1990) – co-founder and co-chairman of the Motley Fool
- Kenneth Gaw (1992) – Hong Kong businessman
- Charles Giancarlo (BSc 1979) – chairman and CEO of Pure Storage, former chief technology officer at Cisco Systems
- Jeffrey W. Greenberg (A.B. 1973) – chairman and CEO of Marsh & McLennan Companies
- Theresia Gouw (Sc.B. 1990) – investor, wealthiest female venture capitalist in the United States
- Ross Greenburg (1977) – president of HBO Sports
- Oliver Haarmann (1990) – founding partner of Searchlight Capital Partners
- James Harmon (A.B. 1957) – investor; President and CEO, Export–Import Bank of the United States (1997–2001)
- Harry Henshel (1940) – CEO of Bulova
- Walter Hoving (Ph.B. 1920) – CEO of Tiffany & Co.
- Moses Brown Ives (1812) – president, Providence Bank
- Nina Jacobson (A.B. 1987) – former president, Walt Disney Studios Motion Pictures

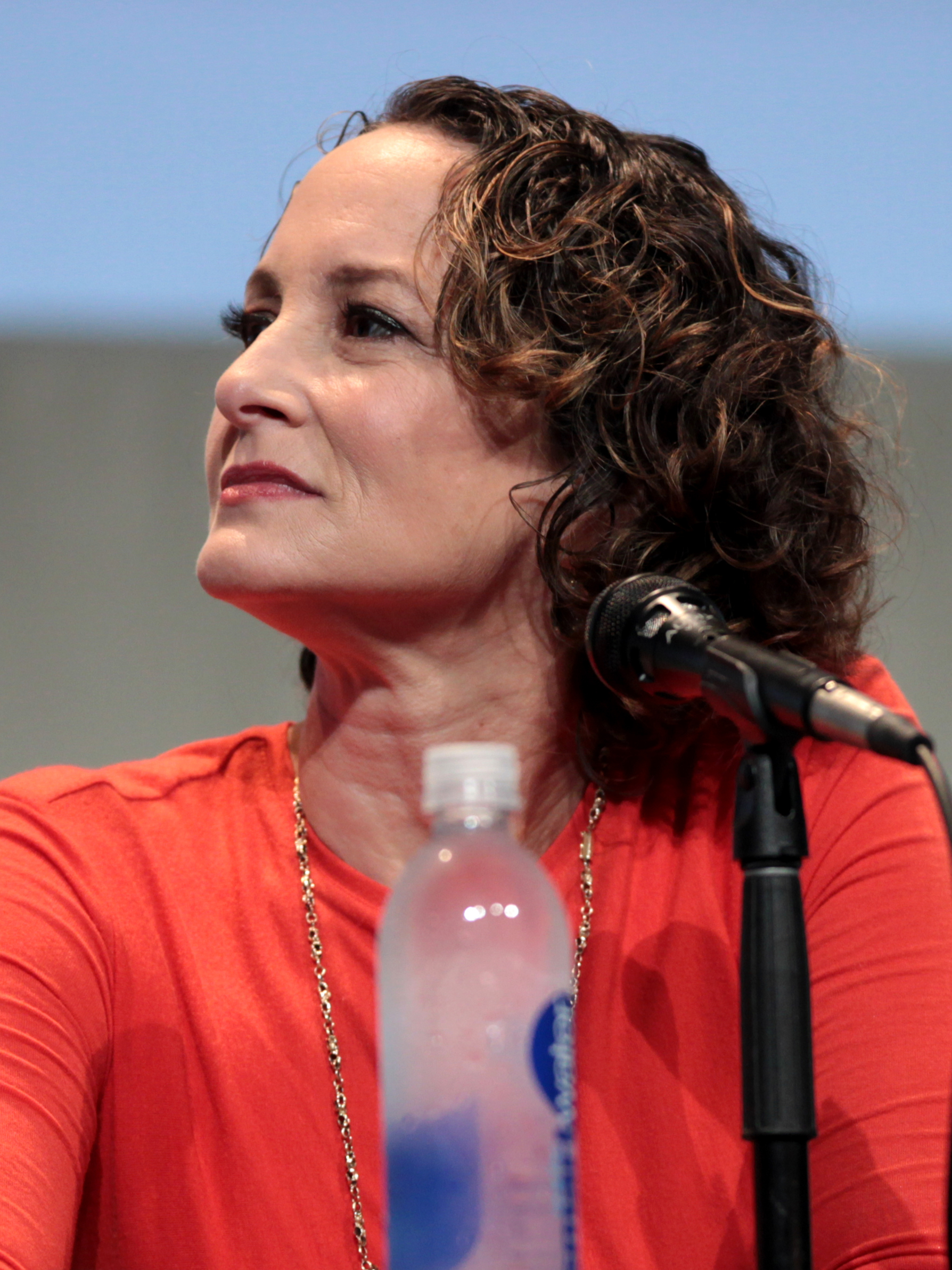
Nina Jacobson (1987)

- Parth Jindal (A.B. 2012) – managing director of JSW Cement, son of Sajjan Jindal
- Craig Kallman (A.B. 1987) – chairman and CEO of Atlantic Records Group
- Ray Kassar (1948) – former CEO of Atari
- Paul Kazarian (M.A. 1980) – billionaire investor
- Dara Khosrowshahi (Sc.B. 1991) – CEO of Uber, former CEO of Expedia Group
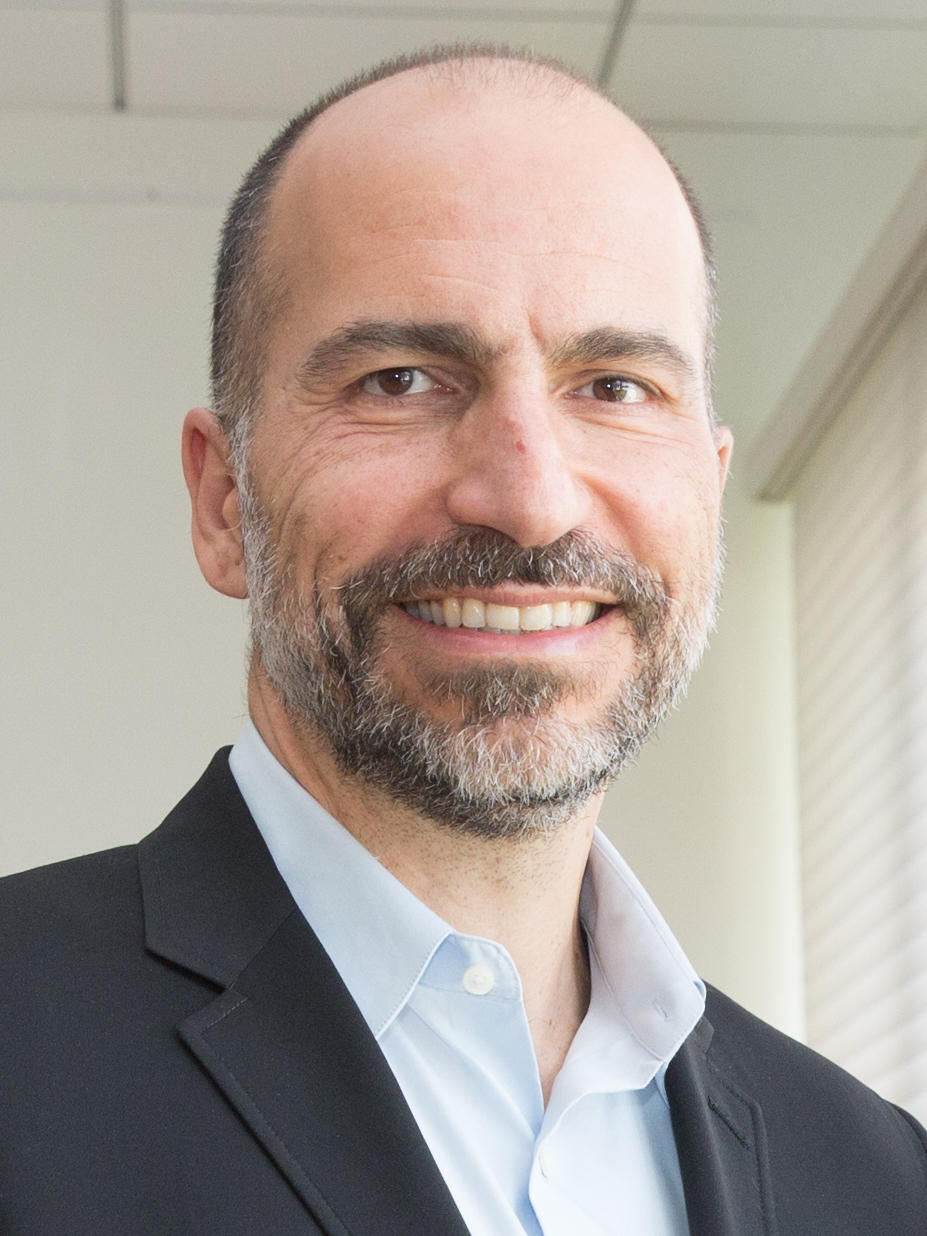
  Dara Khosrowshahi (1991)
- İpek Kıraç (2007, M.P.H. 2011) – Turkish billionaire heiress and businesswoman
- Beth Kobliner (A.B. 1986) – personal finance commentator
- Randy Komisar (A.B. 1976) – co-founder of Claris, former CEO of LucasArts
- Jonathan Klein (A.B. 1980) – former president of CNN/US
- Steph Korey (A.B. 2009) – founder of Away
- Liz Lange (A.B. 1988) – founder of Liz Lange Maternity
- Debra L. Lee (A.B. 1976) – chairman and CEO of Black Entertainment Television
- Gordon Macklin (A.B. 1950) – former president and CEO, NASDAQ
- Nadiem Makarim (A.B. 2006) – founder of Gojek, current Minister of Education and Culture of Indonesia
- Chloe Malle (A.B. 2008) – Head of Editorial Content, Vogue
- Brian Moynihan (A.B. 1981) – president and CEO, Bank of America

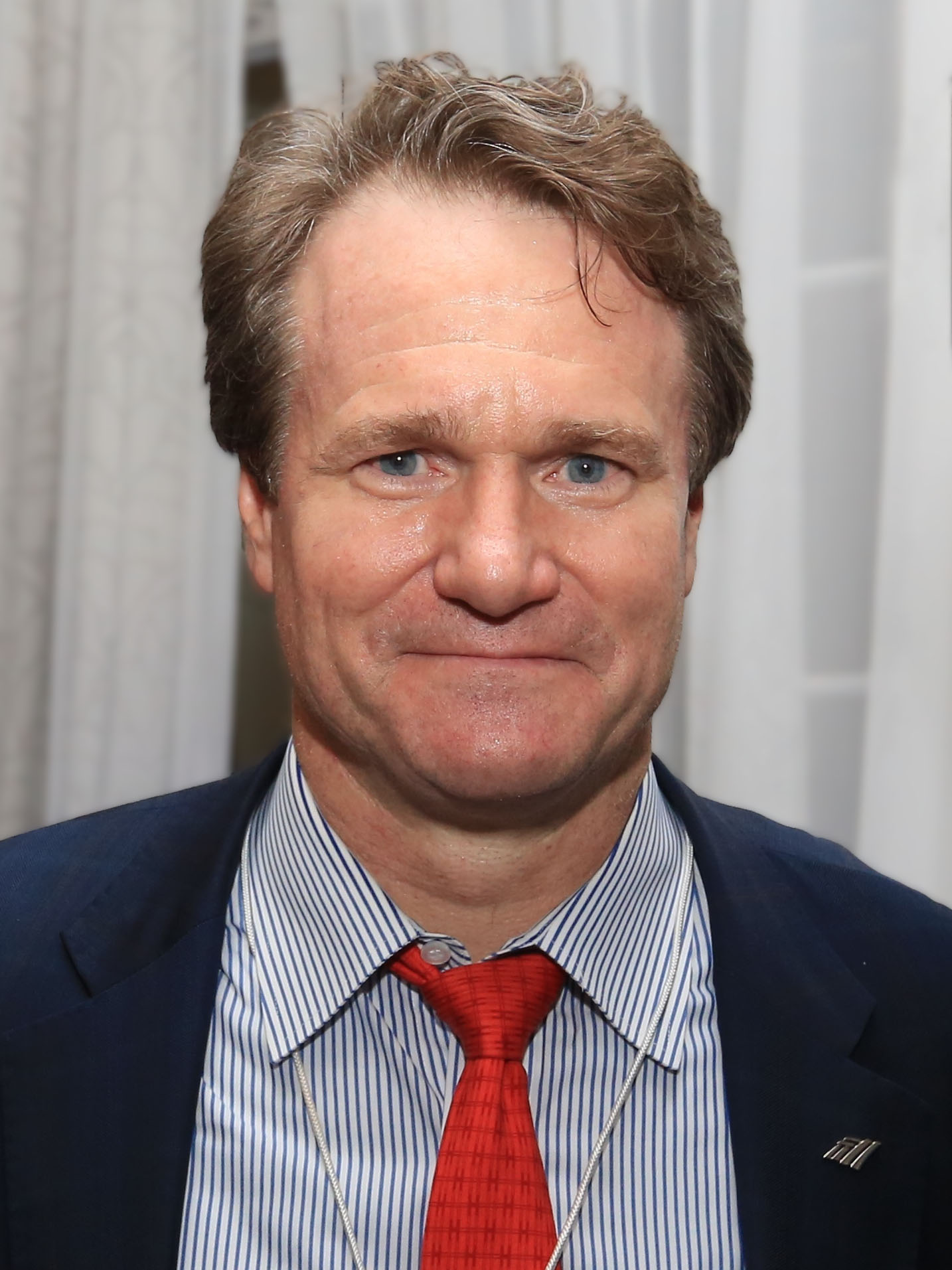
Brian Moynihan (1981)

- Jonathan M. Nelson (A.B. 1977) – billionaire, investor, founder of Providence Equity Partners
- Lucius Pond Ordway (1883) – president, 3M
- Karan Paul (1992) – chairman, Apeejay Surrendra Group
- Steven Price (Sc.B. 1984) – co-founder of Townsquare Media, and minority owner of the Atlanta Hawks
- George Pyne (1988) – founder and CEO of Bruin Sports Capital
- Sridhar Ramaswamy (Ph.D. 1995) – former senior vice president of Advertising and Commerce, Google
- Ajit Ranade (A.M., Ph.D. 1997) – chief economist with the Aditya Birla Group
- Steven Rattner (A.B. 1974) – deputy chairman and Deputy CEO, Lazard Frères & Co.
- William R. Rhodes (A.B. 1957) – senior vice-chairman, Citigroup
- Stephen Robert (A.B. 1962), chairman and CEO of Oppenheimer & Co. (1983–1997), Chancellor of Brown University (1998–2007)
- John D. Rockefeller Jr. (A.B. 1897) – financer, philanthropist, son of John D. Rockefeller, and builder of Rockefeller Center

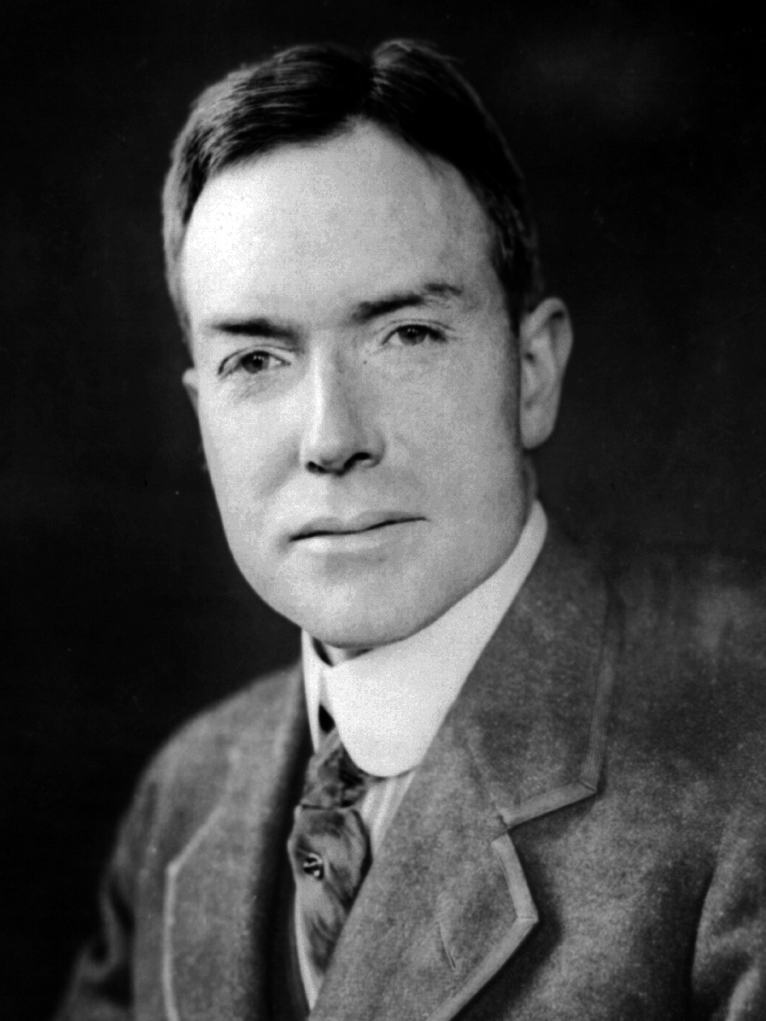
John D. Rockefeller Jr. (1897)

- Tom Rothman (A.B. 1976) – president, 20th Century Fox Film Group
- Tom Scott (A.B. 1989) – co-founder of Nantucket Nectars, with Tom First
- John Sculley (A.B. 1961) – president of PepsiCo (1977–1983); CEO of Apple Computer (1983–1993)
- Josh Silverman (A.B. 1991) – CEO of Etsy (2017–) and Skype (2008–10); founder of Evite
- Rashmi Sinha (Ph.D. 1998) – co-founder and CEO of SlideShare
- Lawrence M. Small (A.B. 1963) – president of Fannie Mae; secretary of the Smithsonian Institution
- Orin R. Smith (1957) – chairman and CEO, Engelhard (1999–2001)
- Barry Sternlicht (A.B. 1982) – co-founder and CEO of Starwood Capital Group, co-founder of Starwood
- Jeff Stibel (Sc.M. 1999) – entrepreneur, founder of Bryant Stibel
- Jeffrey Swartz (A.B. 1982) – former CEO of Timberland
- Melvin Swig (A.B. 1939) – real estate developer and philanthropist
- Ted Turner (Class of 1960) – billionaire founder of CNN and Turner Broadcasting
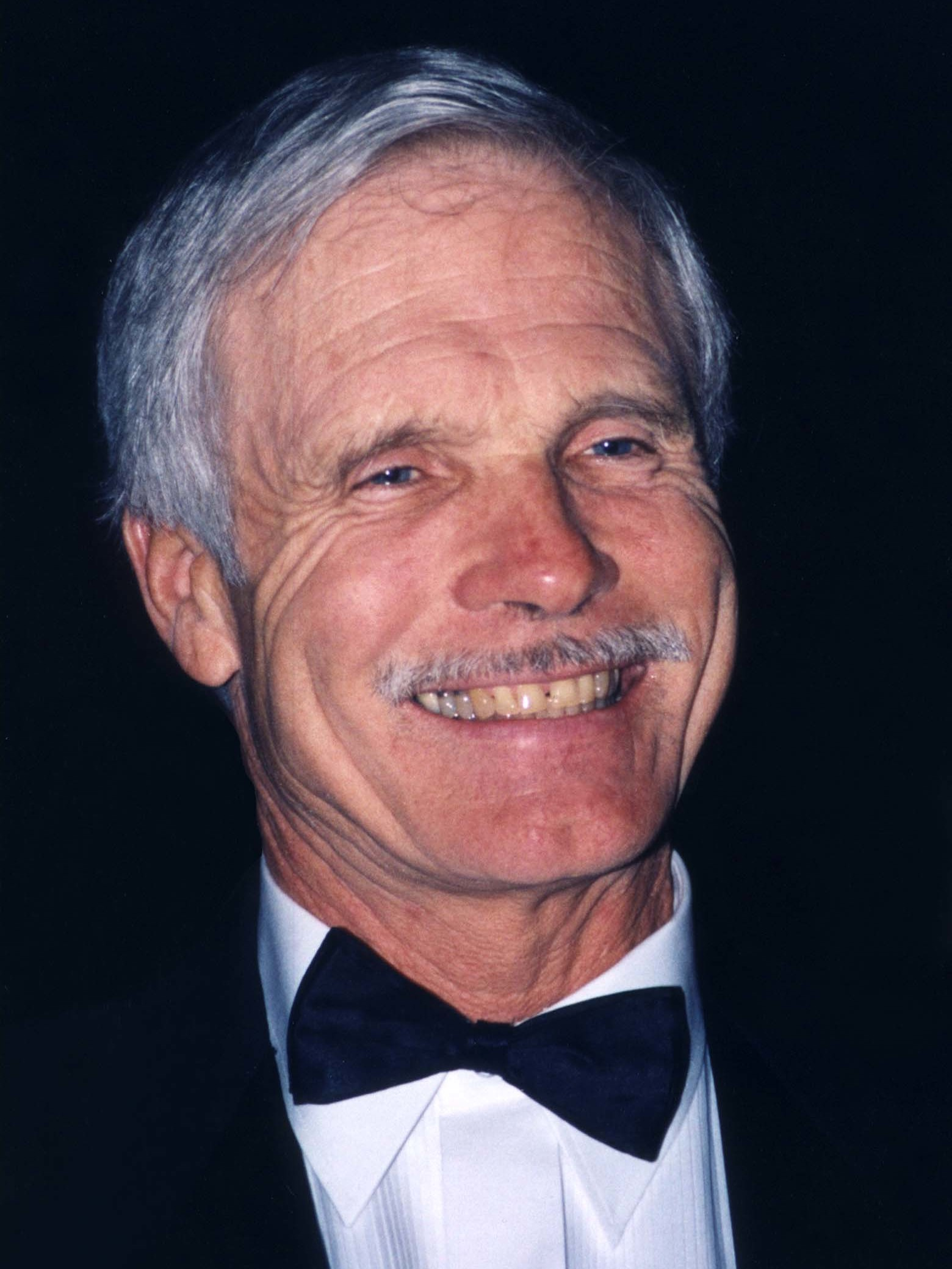
  Ted Turner
- Amelia Warren Tyagi (A.B. 1993) – businesswoman, author; daughter of Massachusetts senator Elizabeth Warren
- Thomas J. Watson Jr. (1937) – president and CEO of IBM (1956–1971); U.S. ambassador to the Soviet Union (1979–1981)
- Gus Wenner (2012) – CEO of Rolling Stone
- Jochen Wermuth (A.M. 1992) – German investor, founder and chief investment officer of Wermuth Asset Management
- Melanie Whelan (1999) – CEO of SoulCycle (2015–2019)
- Meredith Whitney (A.B. 1992) – equity research analyst notable for her prediction of the 2008 financial crisis
- Andrew Yang (A.B. 1996) – founder of Venture for America (VFA), 2020 U.S. Democratic presidential candidate
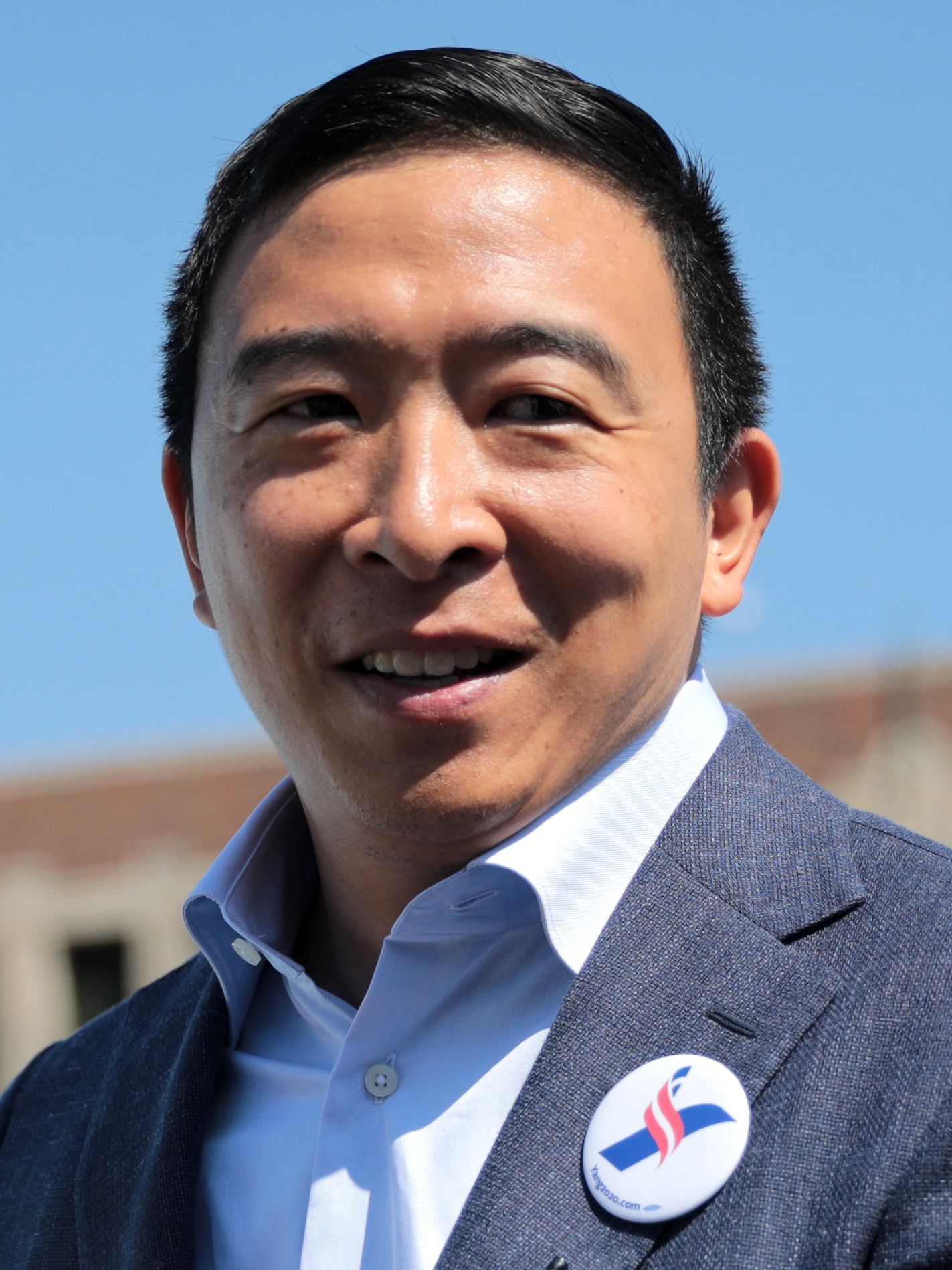
  Andrew Yang (1996)
- Nancy Zimmerman (A.B. 1985) – hedge fund manager, co-founder of Bracebridge Capital

== Journalism ==
- Leroy F. Aarons (A.B. 1955) – journalist; founder of the National Lesbian and Gay Journalists Association
- Rachel Aviv (A.B. 2004) – staff writer at The New Yorker
- Jim Axelrod (A.M. 1989) – chief White House correspondent, CBS News
- Joel Bach (A.B. 1991) – Emmy Award-winning journalist and television producer for 60 Minutes and Years of Living Dangerously
- Rebecca Ballhaus (A.B. 2013) – Pulitzer Prize–winning journalist
- Chris Berman (A.B. 1977) – ESPN host and anchor
- Amy DuBois Barnett (A.B. 1991) – Editer-in-chief, Ebony; editor-in-chief, Teen People; deputy editor, Harper's Bazaar
- Martin Bernheimer (1958) – Pulitzer Prize–winning music critic
- Duncan B. Black, aka Atrios (Ph.D. 1999) – political blogger
- Elizabeth Bruenig (2014–2015) – opinion writer at The New York Times and formerly The Washington Post

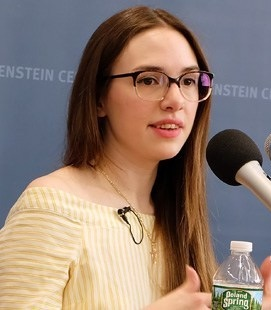
Elizabeth Bruenig

- Alex Cohen (A.B. 1993) – Emmy Award-winning journalist
- Robert Conley (1953) – founding member and former general manager of NPR; creator and original host of All Things Considered; former New York Times front-page correspondent; National Geographic writer; reporter and anchor for NBC and the Huntley-Brinkley Report
- Gareth Cook (A.B. 1991) – Pulitzer Prize for Explanatory Reporting, Boston Globe, for writing about stem cell research
- David Corn (1981) – Washington, D.C. bureau chief for Mother Jones
- Dana Cowin (A.B. 1982) – editor-in-chief of Food & Wine
- Lyn Crost (A.B. 1938) – World War II correspondent and author, Honor by Fire:Japanese Americans at War in Europe and the Pacific
- Sachi Cunningham (1994) – PBS Frontline/world producer and director of photography, Los Angeles Times video journalist
- Adrian Dearnell (A.B. 1994) – Franco-American financial journalist, CEO and founder of EuroBusiness Media
- Larry Elder (A.B. 1974) – columnist; radio personality; TV talk show host, The Larry Elder Show; author; unsuccessful Republican candidate in the 2021 California gubernatorial recall election
- Katherine Eban (A.B. 1989) – investigative journalist
- Chip Giller (A.B. 1993) – environmentalist, founder of Grist
- Ira Glass (A.B. 1982) – host and producer, National Public Radio, This American Life

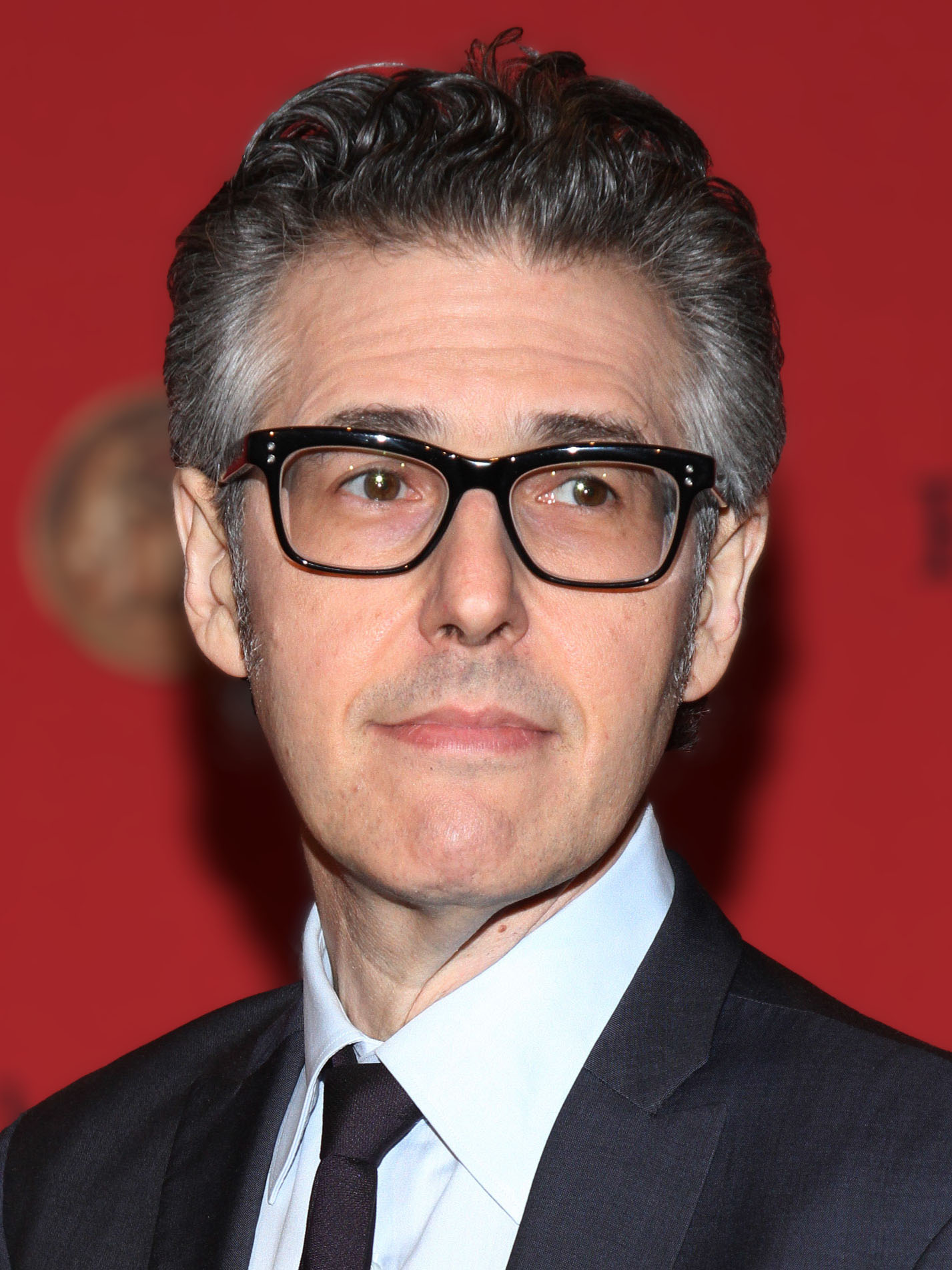
Ira Glass (1982)

- Jerry Green (A.B. 1950) – sports journalist, member of the Pro Football Hall of Fame.
- Catherine Gund (A.B. 1988) – documentary filmmaker; activist
- Chris Hayes (A.B. 2001) – editor of The Nation and host of All in with Chris Hayes on MSNBC

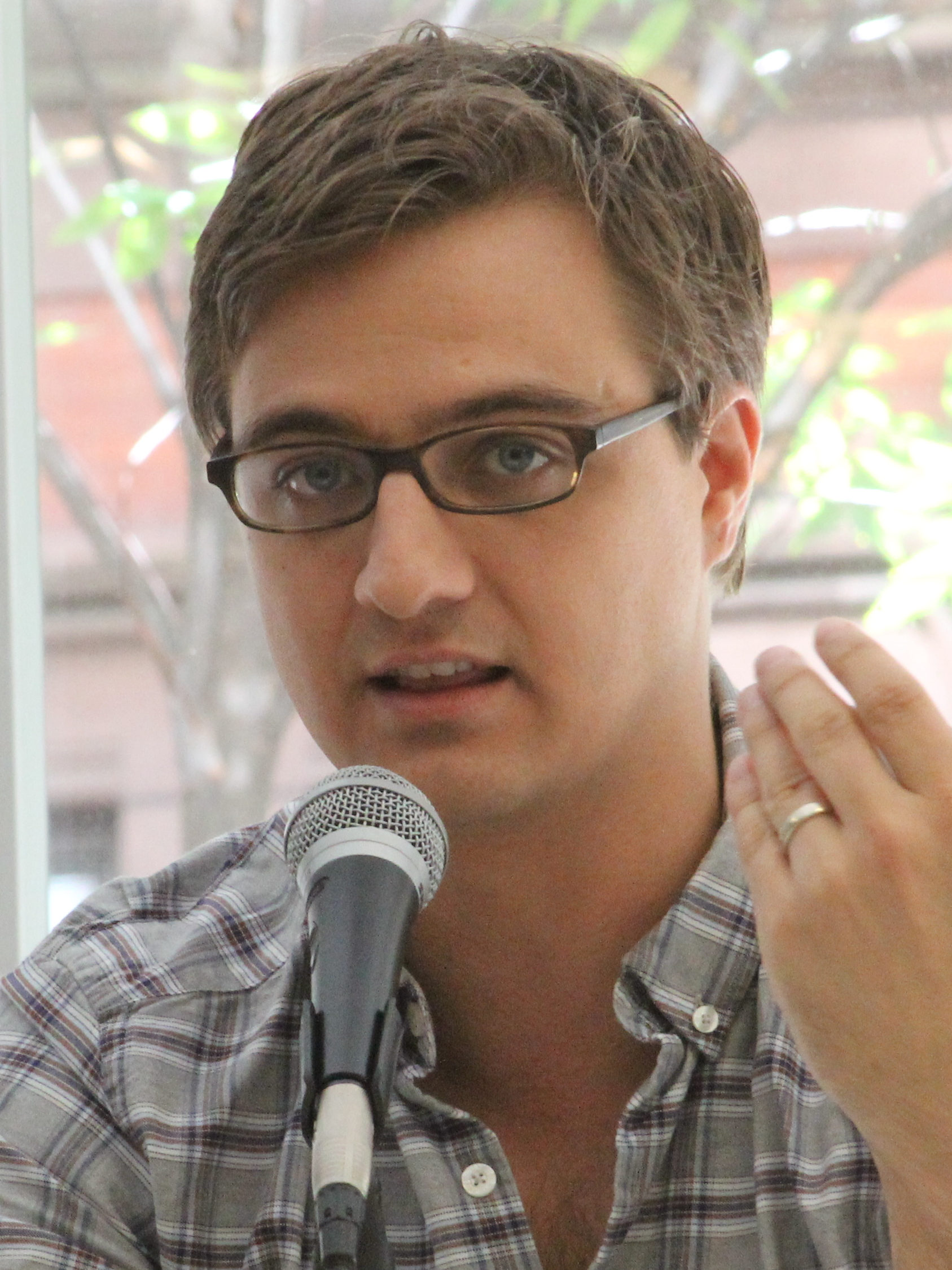
Chris Hayes (2001)

- Tony Horwitz (1980) – journalist, Wall Street Journal, winner of the Pulitzer Prize for National Reporting
- A. J. Jacobs (1990) – journalist and author, The Know-It-All: One Man's Humble Quest to Become the Smartest Person in the World, The Year of Living Biblically
- Edward Davis Jones (Class of 1877) – co-founder of The Wall Street Journal, namesake of the Dow Jones Industrial Average
- Sasha Frere-Jones (Class of 1988) – writer, music critic, and musician
- John F. Kennedy Jr. (A.B. 1983) – lawyer; journalist; publisher of George magazine; son of President John F. Kennedy; killed in an airplane crash on July 16, 1999

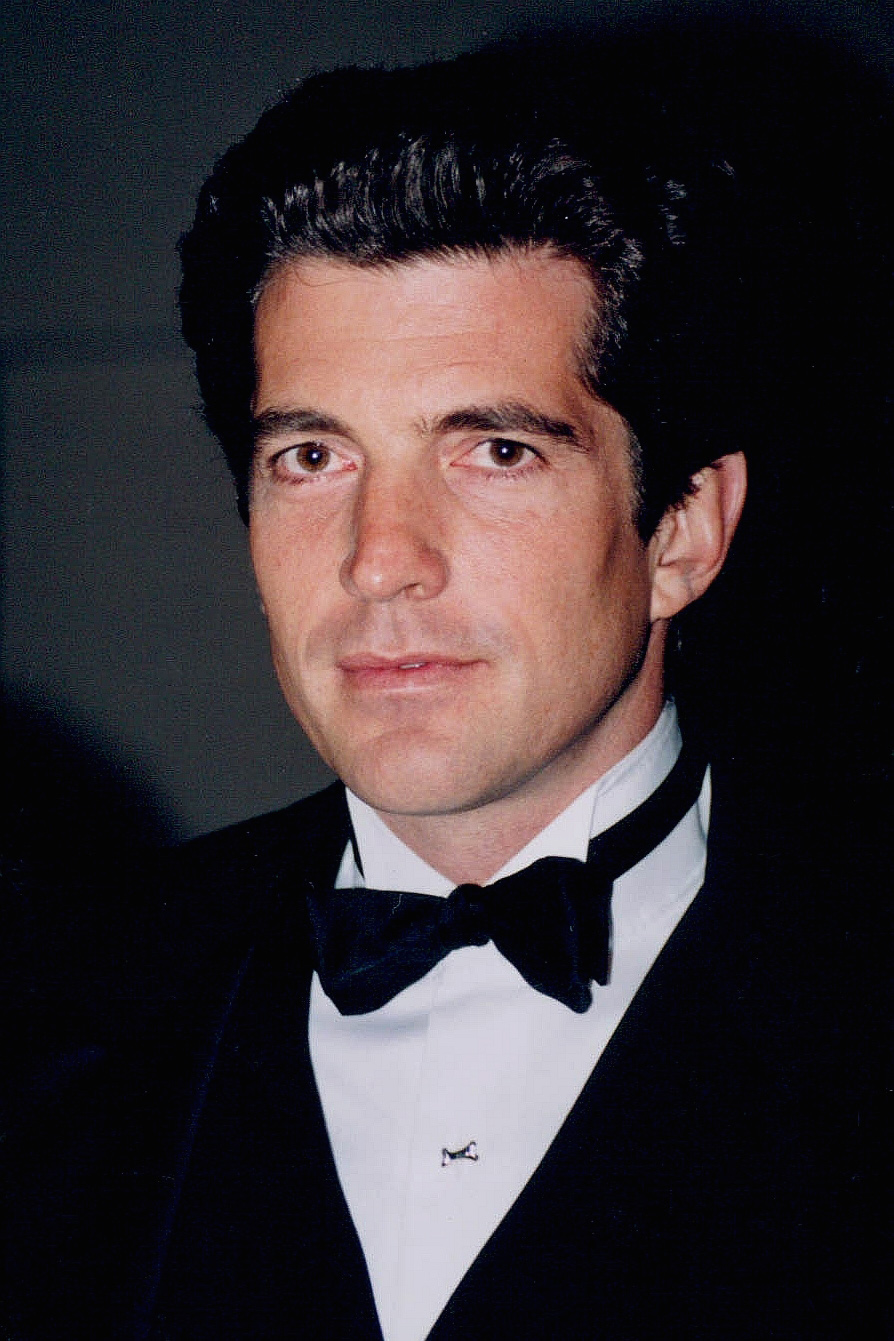
John F. Kennedy Jr. (1983)

- Glenn Kessler (A.B. 1981) – diplomatic correspondent for The Washington Post
- Noel King (A.B. 2004) – co-host of Morning Edition and Up First
- Hiroko Kuniya (A.B. 1979) – Japanese news anchor
- Erik Kuselias (1991) – host of Sportsline and CBS Sports
- Sharon LaFraniere (A.B. 1977) – Pulitzer Prize–winning journalist at The New York Times
- Sharon Lerner – investigative reporter and environmental journalist
- Josh Levin (2002) – national editor at Slate
- Irving R. Levine (1944) – former NBC News correspondent
- Mara Liasson (A.B. 1977) – NPR correspondent
- Bill Lichtenstein (1978) – journalist, documentary filmmaker, president of LCMedia, Inc.; recipient of Guggenheim Fellowship and Peabody Award
- Andrew Marantz (2006) – staff writer at The New Yorker
- Mark Maremont (1980) – senior special writer for the Wall Street Journal; two-time Pulitzer Prize winner
- Josh Marshall (Ph.D. 2003) – Polk Award-winning journalist; founder, Talking Points Memo
- Usha Lee McFarling (A.B. 1989) – director, Knight Science Journalism Fellowship program, MIT; recipient of the 2007 Pulitzer Prize for Explanatory Reporting
- Matthew Miller (A.B. 1983) – senior fellow, Center for American Progress; columnist for Fortune; regular contributor to The New York Times Magazine
- George Musser (Sc.B. 1988) – author and editor at Scientific American
- Pamela Paul (A.B. 1993) – opinion columnist, The New York Times, editor of The New York Times Book Review (2013–2022)

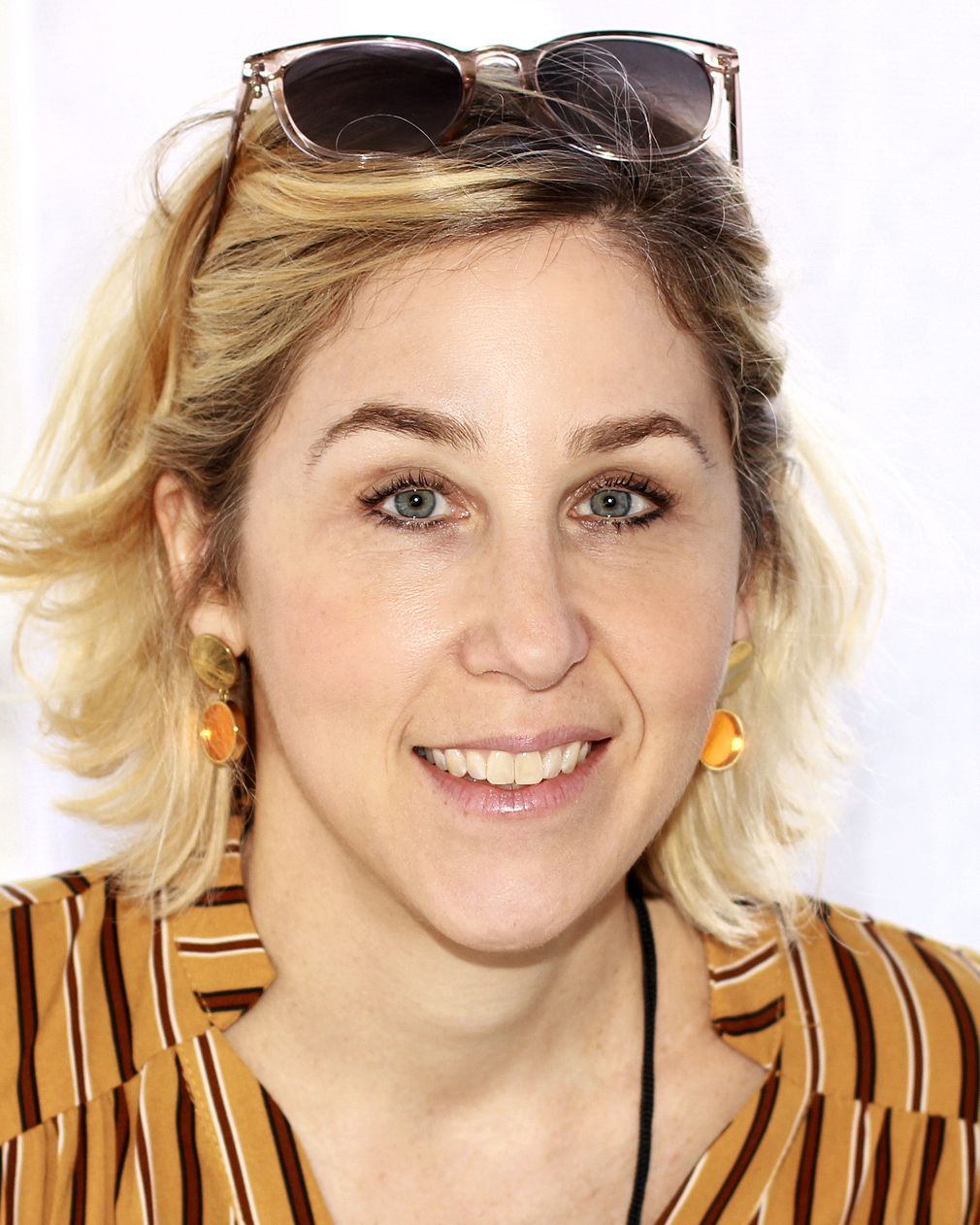
Pamela Paul (1993)

- Holly Peterson (A.B. 1987) – contributing editor for Newsweek magazine, editor-at-large for Talk magazine, producer for ABC News
- Sasha Polakow-Suransky (2001) – deputy editor at Foreign Policy, Rhodes Scholar
- Scott Poulson-Bryant (A.B. 2008, originally Class of 1989) – co-founding editor of VIBE Magazine
- Andrew Revkin (A.B. 1978) – environmental journalist, New York Times; recipient of 2008 Columbia University Journalism School John Chancellor Award
- Quentin Reynolds (1924) – World War II war correspondent
- James Risen (1977) – journalist for The Intercept; author of two books about the Central Intelligence Agency; broke the 2005 story of warrantless NSA wiretapping; winner of the 2006 Pulitzer Prize for National Reporting
- David S. Rohde (A.B. 1990) – Pulitzer Prize–winning journalist; escaped from 7-month Taliban captivity in 2009
- Kevin Roose (Class of 2009) – technology columnist for The New York Times
- Alissa J. Rubin (A.B. 1980) – Pulitzer Prize–winning journalist, Baghdad Bureau chief, The New York Times
- Margaret Russell (1980) – editor-in-chief, Elle Decor magazine; design judge, Top Design
- Laura Secor (A.B.) – journalist
- Aaron Schatz (1996) – ESPN NFL analyst, founder of Football Outsiders
- Kathryn Schulz (A.B. 1996) – Pulitzer Prize–winning journalist, staff writer at The New Yorker

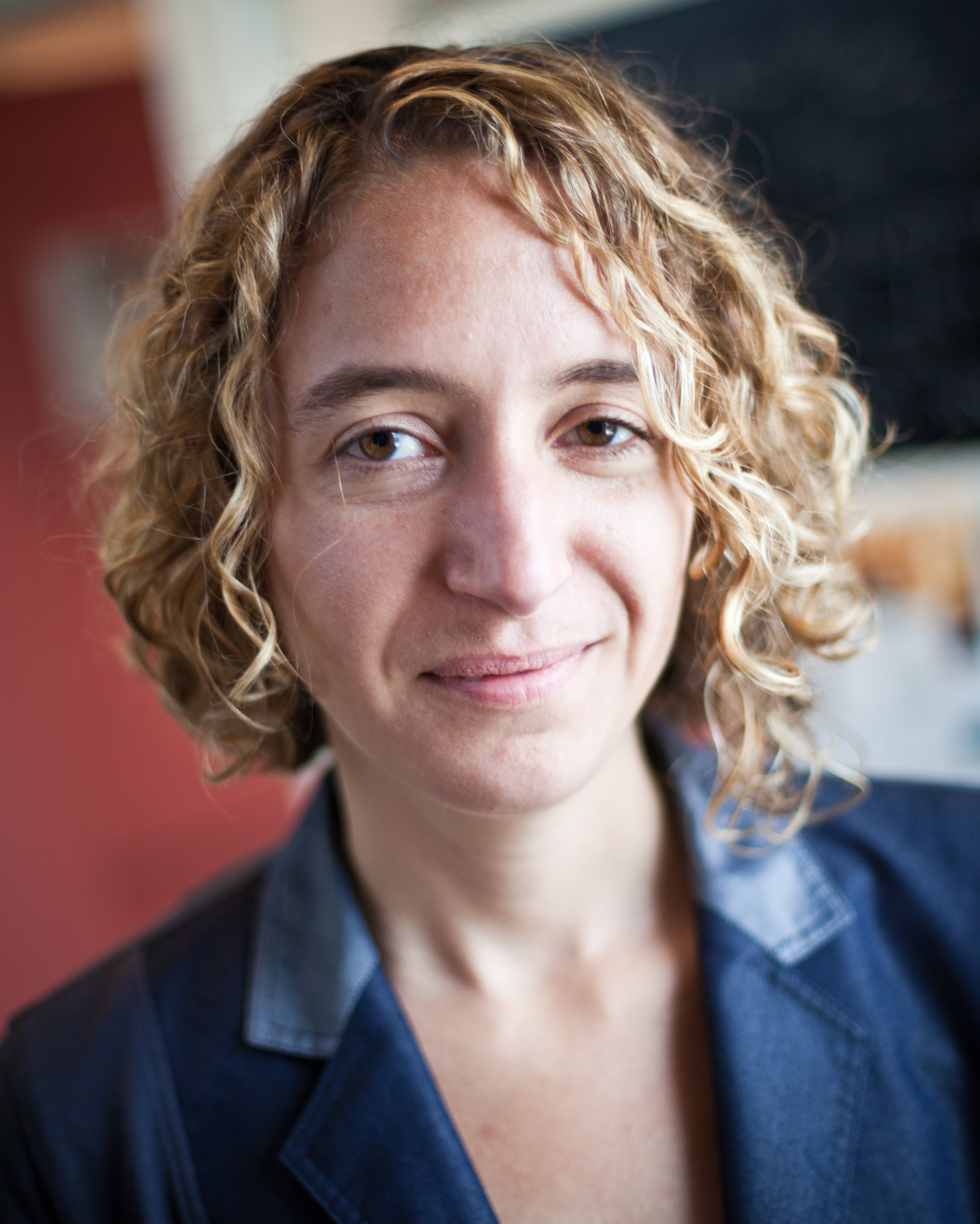
Kathryn Schulz (1996)

- Julia Flynn Siler (A.B. 1983) – journalist and nonfiction author
- Elissa Silverman (A.B. 1995) – journalist, member of the Council of the District of Columbia at-large (2015–2023)
- Amy Sohn (A.B. 1995) – columnist, New York magazine; novelist, Run Catch Kiss and Sex and the City: Kiss and Tell
- Doreen St. Félix (2014) – staff writer at The New Yorker
- Alison Stewart (A.B. 1988) – host, MSNBC's The Most with Alison Stewart
- A. G. Sulzberger (A.B. 2003) – publisher, The New York Times; chairman of The New York Times Company

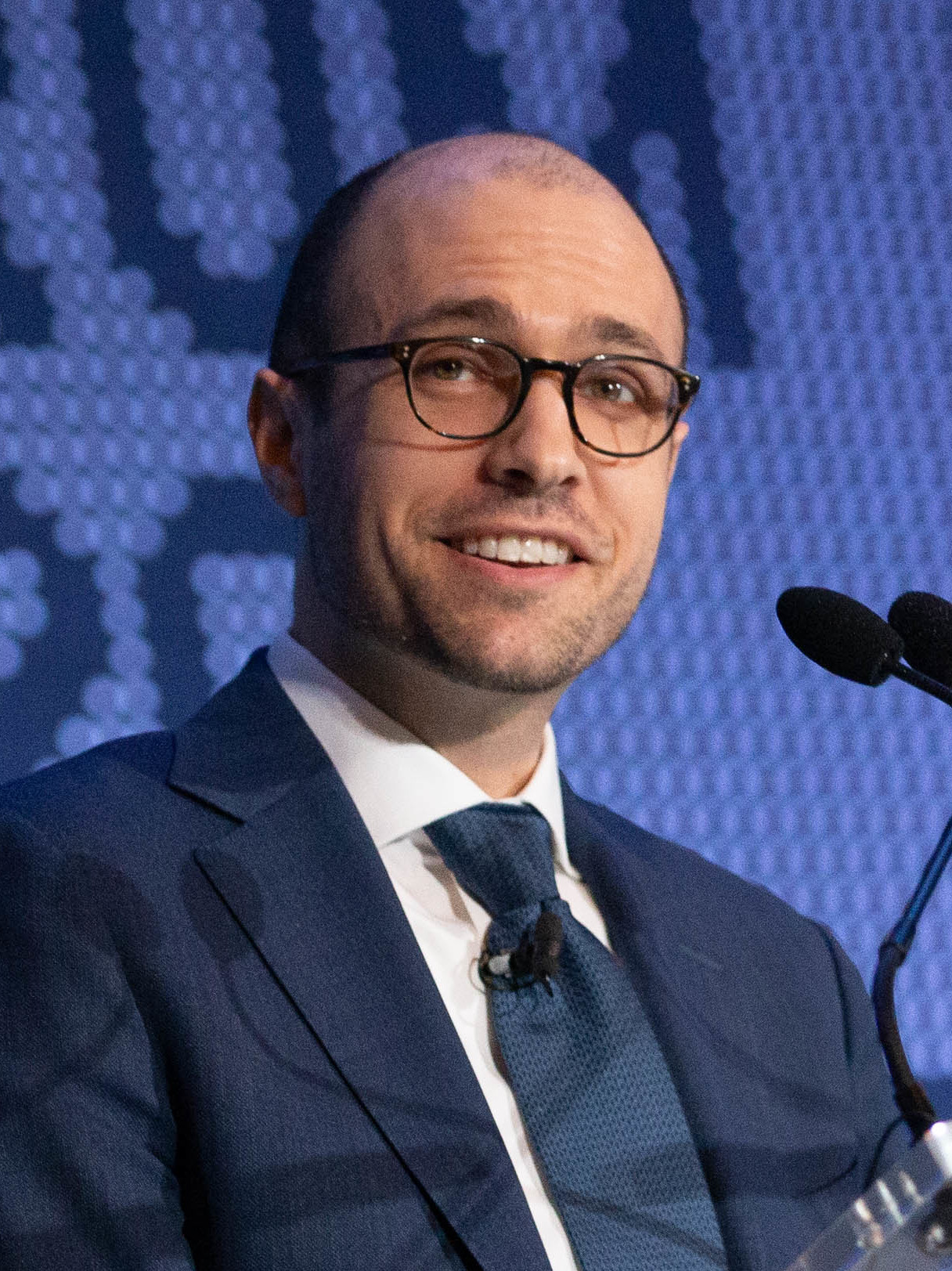
A. G. Sulzberger (2005)

- André Leon Talley (A.M. 1973) – Vogue magazine editor-at-large; first African-American male creative director of Vogue; regarded as "fashion icon"
- Wallace Terry (A.B. 1959) – African-American journalist, author, and oral historian known for his coverage of Black soldiers in the Vietnam War
- Salamishah Tillet (M.A.T. 1997) – Pulitzer Prize-winning essayist
- Krista Tippett (A.B. 1983) – host, NPR's Speaking of Faith, and creator and host of On Being
- Larry Tye (A.B. 1977) – journalist
- Alex Wagner (A.B. 1999) – host, Alex Wagner Tonight, MSNBC
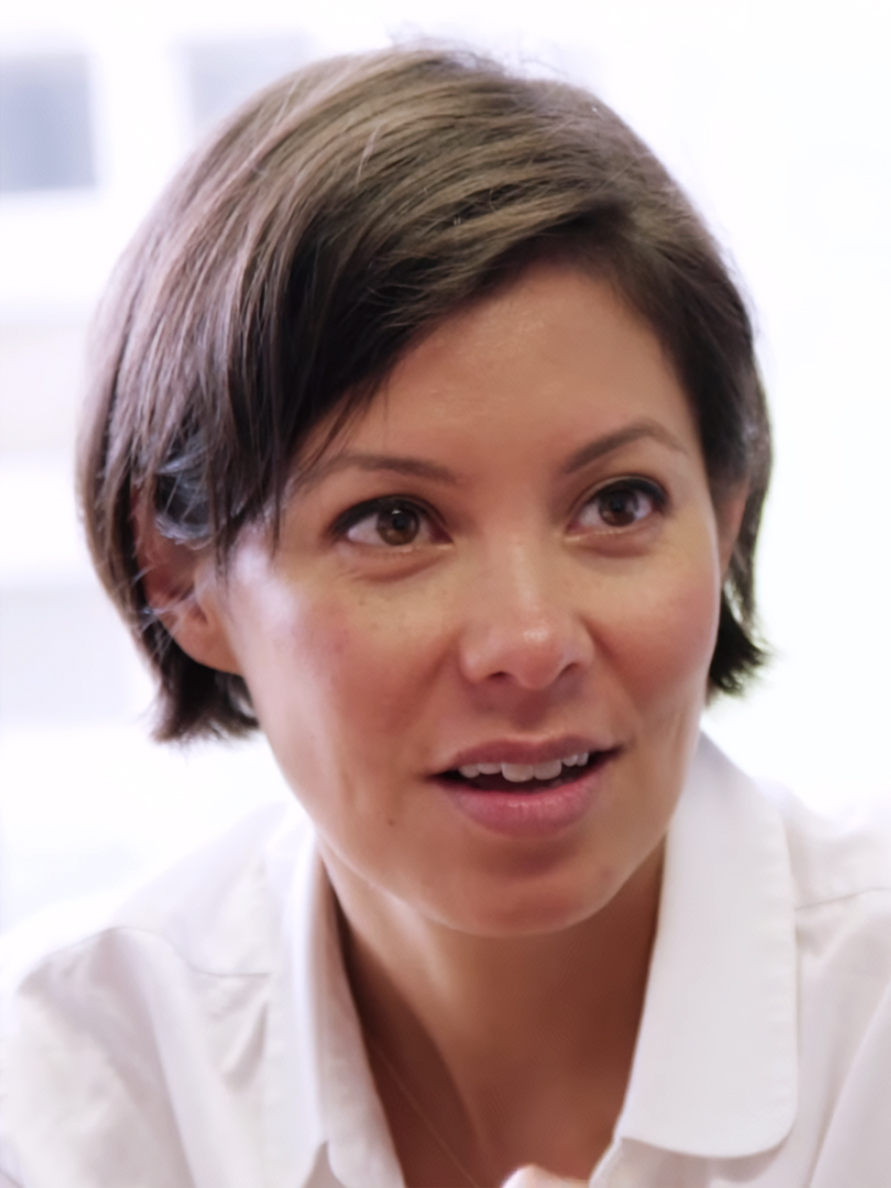
  Alex Wagner (1999)
- David Wallace-Wells (A.B. 2004) – opinion columnist, The New York Times; author of The Uninhabitable Earth
- Ivan Watson (A.B. 1997) – senior international correspondent, CNN
- Emily Witt (A.B. 2003) – staff writer, The New Yorker
- Curtis Yarvin (1992) – blogger, political theorist, software engineer, and internet entrepreneur associated with the Dark Enlightenment

== Literature ==
- Lauren Acampora (A.B. 1997) – author
- David Allyn (A.B. 1991) – author, Make Love, Not War, I Can't Believe I Just Did That, playwright, Baptizing Adam
- Donald Antrim (A.B. 1981) – author, Elect Mr. Robinson for a Better World, The Verificationist, The Hundred Brothers, recipient of the MacArthur fellowship
- Jacob M. Appel (A.B. 1995) – author, playwright, Arborophilia, Creve Coeur, The Mistress of Wholesome
- Mona Awad (M.F.A. 2014) – novelist and short story writer
- Peter Balakian (Ph.D. 1980) – Pulitzer Prize-winning poet, Ozone Journal
- Edward Ball (A.B. 1982) – National Book Award-winning nonfiction writer, Slaves in the Family, The Genetic Strand and Life of a Klansman: A Family History in White Supremacy
- Mark Baumer (M.F.A. 2011) – writer and environmental activist
- Josh Bazell (A.B. 1992) – novelist
- Bill Berkson (1957–1959) – poet and critic
- Lisa Birnbach (A.B. 1978) – author, The Official Preppy Handbook
- Kate Bornstein (née Albert Bornstein) (A.B. 1969) – transgender activist, performance artist, playwright, and gender studies writer
- Jeffrey Carver (A.B. 1971) – science fiction author, Nebula Award finalist
- Andrew Chaikin (A.B. 1978) – author, A Man on the Moon
- Jessamine Chan (2000) – author, The School for Good Mothers
- Susan Cheever (A.B. 1965) – author
- Frank Chipasula (A.M. 1980, Ph.D. 1987) – Malawian writer
- Franny Choi (A.B. 2011) – poet
- Mallika Chopra (A.B. 1993) – author and self-help entrepreneur
- Ted Chiang (Sc.B. 1989) – Nebula Award, Locus Award, and Hugo Award-winning science fiction writer; author of Story of Your Life, the basis for the film Arrival

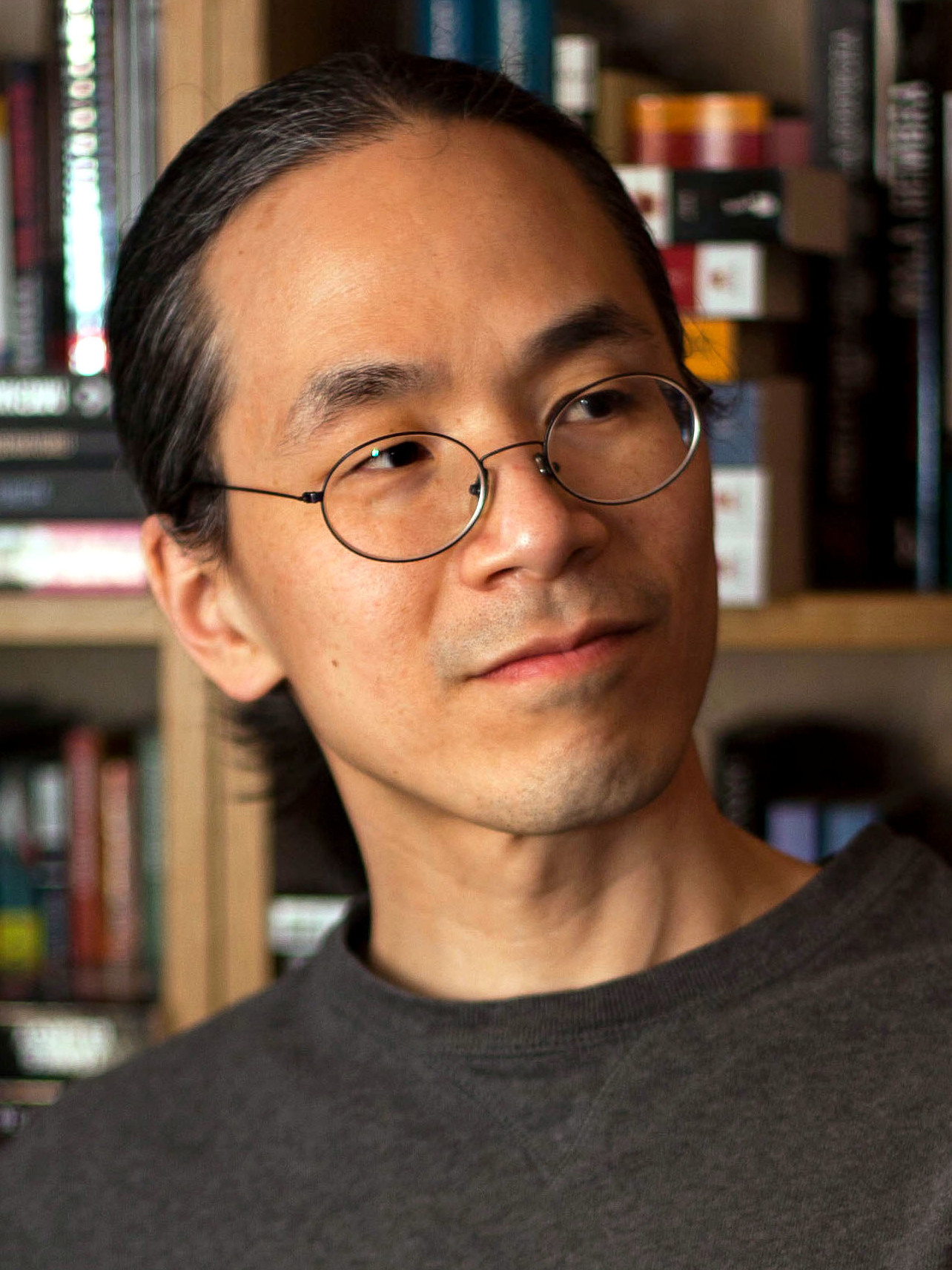
Ted Chiang (1989)

- Brian Christian (A.B. 2006) – author, The Most Human Human
- Zinzi Clemmons (A.B. 2007) – author
- Nicole Cooley (A.B. 1988) – poet, professor of English, Queens College, City University of New York
- Nilo Cruz (M.F.A. 1994) – Pulitzer Prize–winning playwright, Anna in the Tropics
- Edwidge Danticat (M.F.A. 1993) – American Book Award-winning author, Breath, Eyes, Memory, The Dew Breaker, recipient of the MacArthur fellowship
- Cyrus Grace Dunham (2014) – author, A Year Without A Name: A Memoir
- David Ebershoff (A.B. 1991) – Lambda Literary Award-winning author, The Danish Girl, editor-at-large at Random House, professor at Columbia University
- Jeffrey Eugenides (A.B. 1983) – Pulitzer Prize–winning author, Middlesex, The Virgin Suicides, The Marriage Plot
- Percival Everett (A.M. 1982) – novelist, poet; Distinguished Professor of English, University of Southern California; winner of the Pulitzer Prize, Kirkus Prize and the National Book Award for Fiction and finalist for the Booker Prize for his 2024 novel James

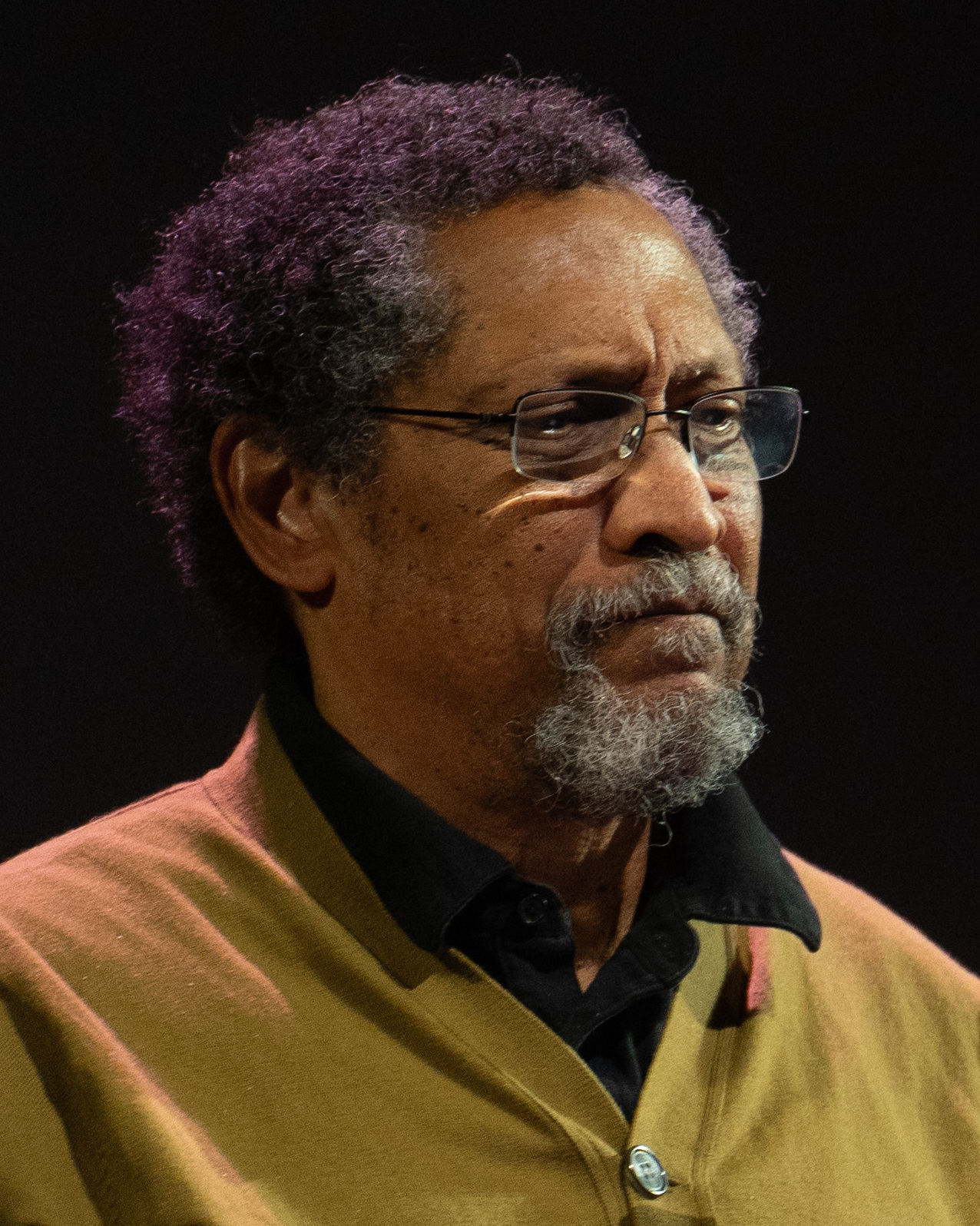
Percival Everett (1982)

- Rudolph Fisher (A.B. 1919, A.M. 1920) – author, musician, physician; a leader of the Harlem Renaissance
- Richard Foreman (A.B. 1959) – playwright/avant-garde theater pioneer; founder, Ontological-Hysteric Theater, recipient of the MacArthur fellowship
- Sam Walter Foss (A.B. 1882) – poet
- Sarah Gambito (M.F.A. 1999) – poet; director of Creative Writing, Fordham University
- Deborah Garrison (A.B. 1986) – poet
- Peter Gizzi (M.F.A. 1991) – poet, professor at the University of Massachusetts Amherst's MFA Program for Poets & Writers
- Xochitl Gonzalez (A.B. 1999) – author and screenwriter, Olga Dies Dreaming; staff writer at The Atlantic
- Jaimy Gordon (A.M. 1972, A.D. 1975) – National Book Award-winning author, Lord of Misrule
- Andrew Sean Greer (A.B. 1992) – Pulitzer Prize–winning author, Less
- Jennifer Haley (M.F.A. 2005) – playwright, winner of the 2012 Susan Smith Blackburn Prize
- Jordan Harrison (M.F.A. 2003) – playwright, finalist for the 2015 Pulitzer Prize for Drama
- Joan D. Hedrick (Ph.D. 1974) – Pulitzer Prize–winning historian and biographer
- Tony Horwitz (A.B. 1980) – Pulitzer Prize–winning journalist, author of Confederates in the Attic, Blue Latitudes
- Shelley Jackson (M.F.A. 1994) – hyperfiction writer, author of Patchwork Girl
- Steven Johnson (A.B. 1990) – writer and popular science author, including the 2005 best-seller Everything Bad is Good for You: How Today's Popular Culture Is Actually Making Us Smarter
- Winthrop Jordan (Ph.D. 1960) – American Civil War and racial history writer, winner of the National Book Award and Bancroft Prize
- Gayl Jones (M.A. 1973, Ph.D. 1975) – novelist, poet, and playwright; "literary legend" of Black literature
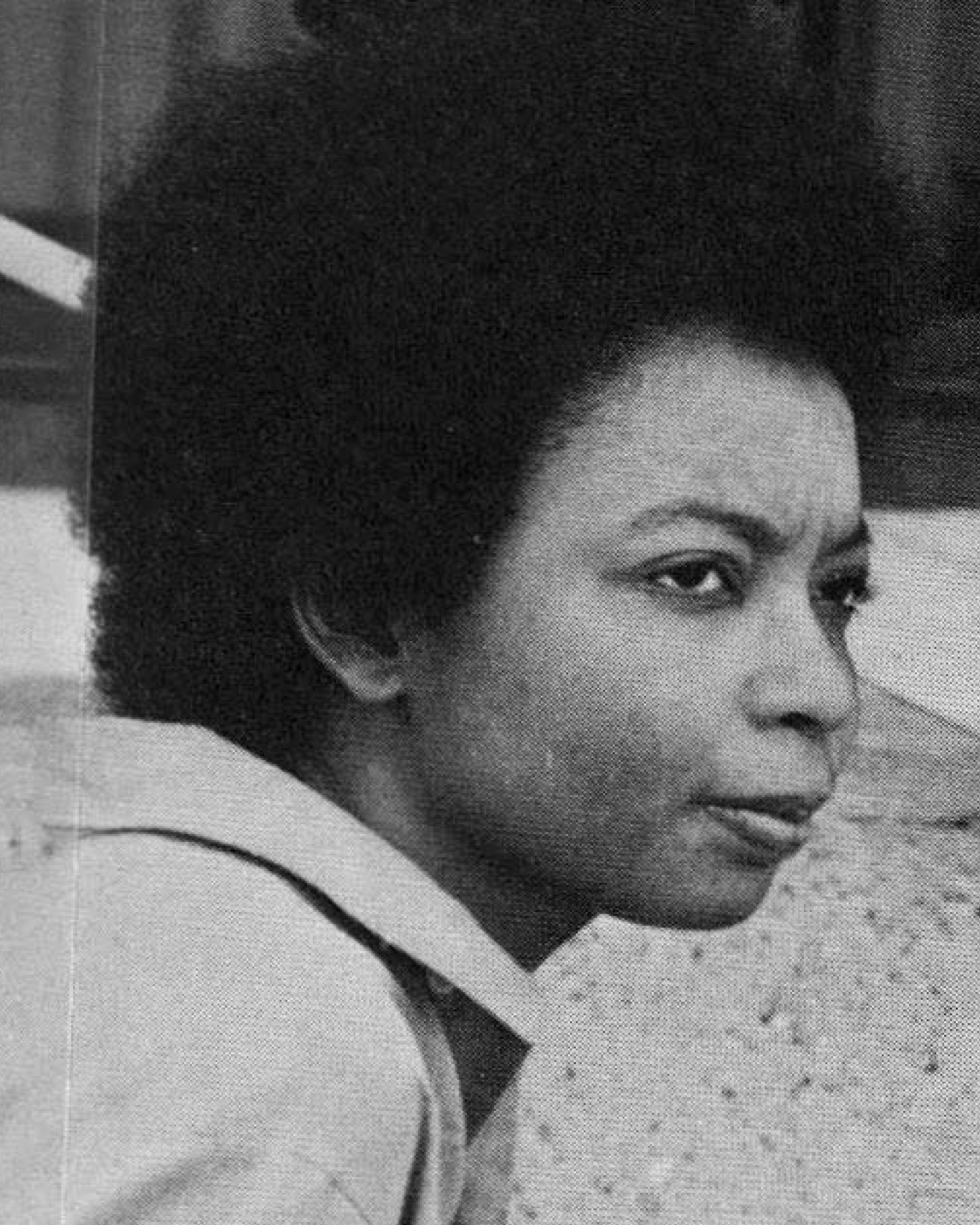
  Gayl Jones (1973, 1975)
- Zeyn Joukhadar (Ph.D. 2014) – novelist
- Bess Kalb (A.B. 2010) – author and television writer
- Phil Kaye (A.B. 2010) – poet and spoken word artist
- Sarah Kay (A.B. 2010, M.A.T. 2012) – poet and spoken word artist
- Jonathan Karp (A.B. 1986) – publisher, CEO of Simon & Schuster
- Caroline Kepnes (A.B. 1999) – author and screenwriter, You (adapted into a television series of the same name), Hidden Bodies, Providence
- Alexandra Kleeman (A.B. 2007) – writer
- T. E. D. Klein (A.B. 1969) – horror fiction writer and magazine editor
- Caroline Knapp (A.B. 1981) – essayist and author, Drinking: A Love Story
- Richard Kostelanetz (A.B.1962) – cultural historian, fictioner, poet, experimental writer, critic of avant-garde arts and artists, anthologist
- Geoffrey A. Landis (Ph.D. 1988) – Nebula Award and Hugo Award-winning scientist-writer and hard science fiction author
- Reif Larsen (A.B 2003) – professor at Columbia University; author, The Selected Works of T.S. Spivet
- Marie Myung-Ok Lee (A.B. 1986) – author and essayist
- Joanne Leedom-Ackerman (A.M. 1969) – author and journalist
- Ben Lerner (A.B. 2001, M.F.A. 2003) – poet, author of Angle of Yaw, Leaving the Atocha Station, 10:04, The Topeka School, and The Lichtenberg Figures, recipient of the MacArthur fellowship
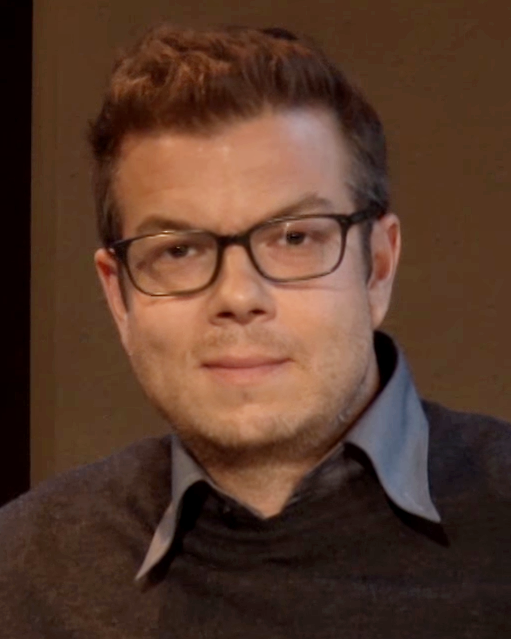
  Ben Lerner (2001, 2003)
- Steven Levenson (A.B. 2006) – author, Dear Evan Hansen, winner of the 2017 Tony Award for Best Book of a Musical
- David Levithan (A.B. 1993) – author, Boy Meets Boy, Will Grayson, Will Grayson, Nick and Norah's Infinite Playlist
- Alan Levy (A.B. 1952) – author
- Jim Lewis (A.B. 1980) - novelist.
- David Lipsky (A.B. 1987) – author, Three Thousand Dollars, The Art Fair, Absolutely American
- Sam Lipsyte (A.B. 1990) – author, Home Land, Venus Drive, The Fun Parts
- Lois Lowry (Class of 1958) – Newbery Medal-winning author, The Giver

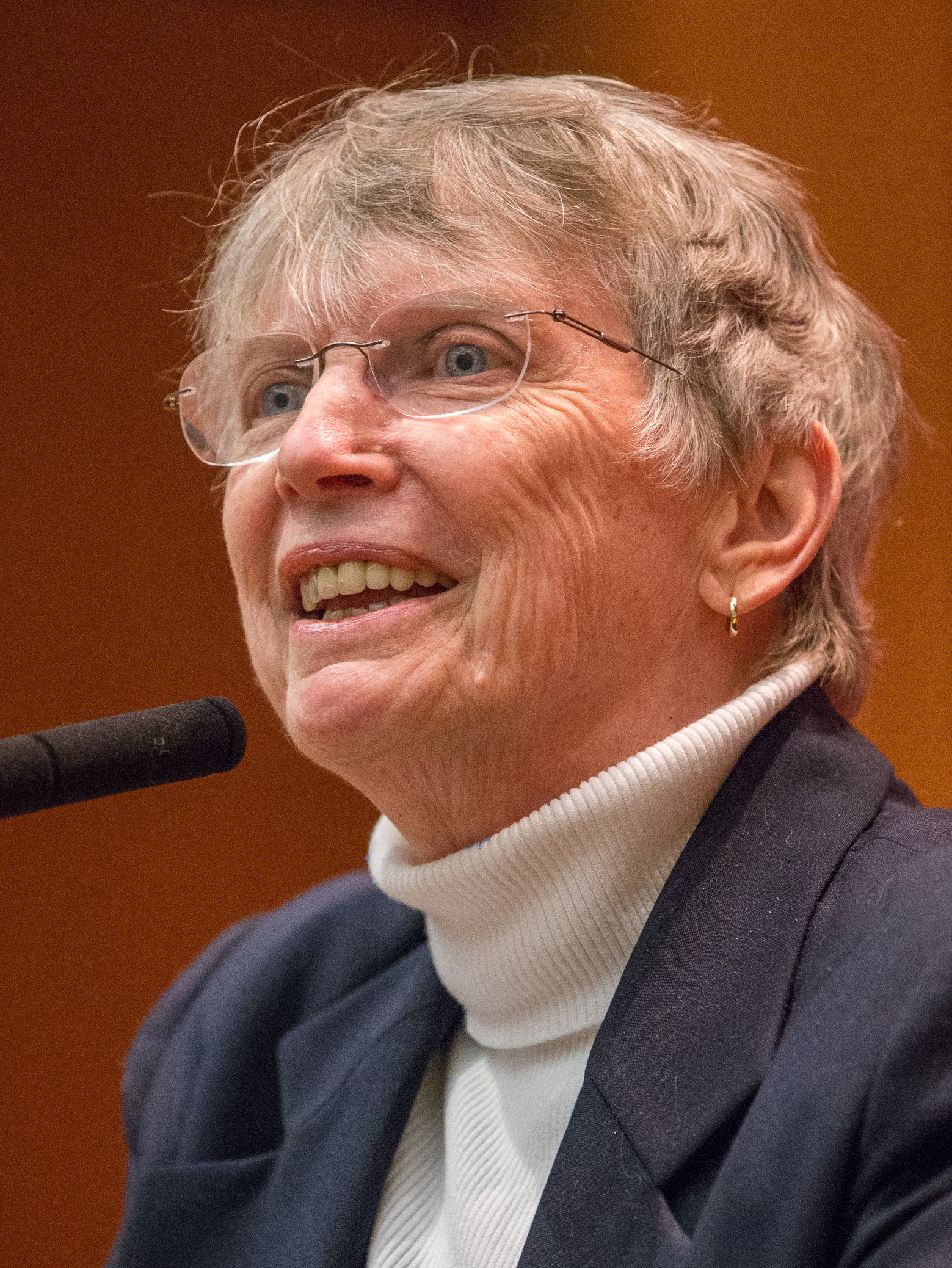
Lois Lowry

- Thomas Mallon (A.B. 1973) – author, Henry and Clara, Bandbox, Dewey Defeats Truman, Two Moons
- Ben Marcus (M.F.A. 1991) – author, The Age of Wire and String, Notable American Women
- Alex McAulay (A.B.) – author, Bad Girls, Lost Summer, Oblivion Road, Shelter Me
- Emily Arnold McCully (A.B. 1961) – Caldecott Award-winning children's author, Mirette on the High Wire
- Mark C. McGarrity (A.B. 1966) – wrote crime fiction under the name Bartholomew Gill
- Roland Merullo (A.B. 1975, A.M.) – author
- Madeline Miller (A.B. 2000, A.M. 2001) – Women's Prize for Fiction-winning author of The Song of Achilles and Circe

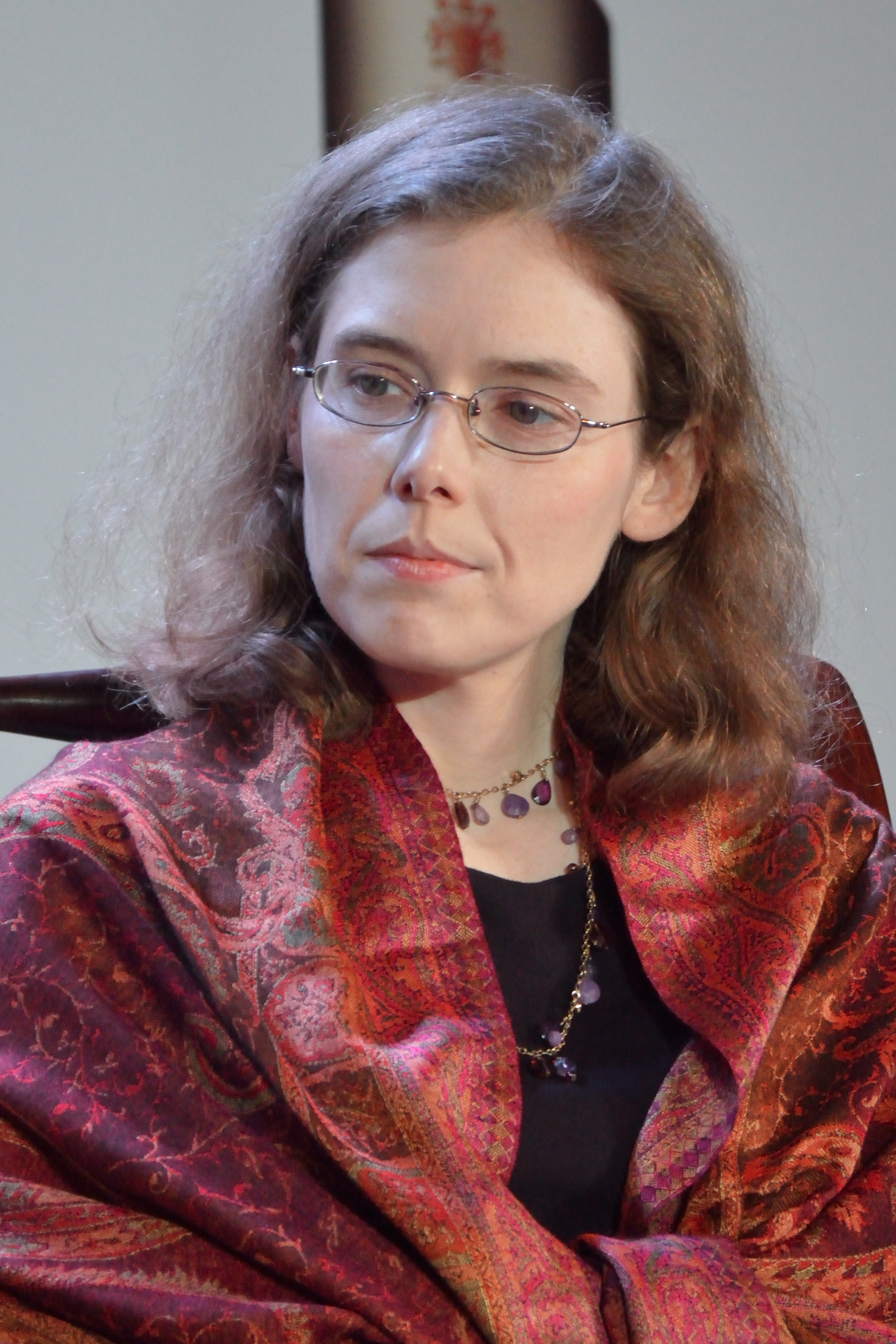
Madeline Miller (2000, 2001)

- Steven Millhauser (1968–71) – Pulitzer Prize–winning author, Martin Dressler
- Rick Moody (A.B. 1983) – author, The Ice Storm, Garden State, Purple America, The Diviners
- Kass Morgan (A.B.) – author, The 100
- Rebecca Morris (M.F.A. 1986) – nonfiction author, Ted and Ann, If I Can't Have You, A Killing in Amish Country
- Benjamin Moser (A.B. 1998) – Pulitzer Prize–winning author
- Ottessa Moshfegh (M.F.A. 2011) – writer, author of My Year of Rest and Relaxation

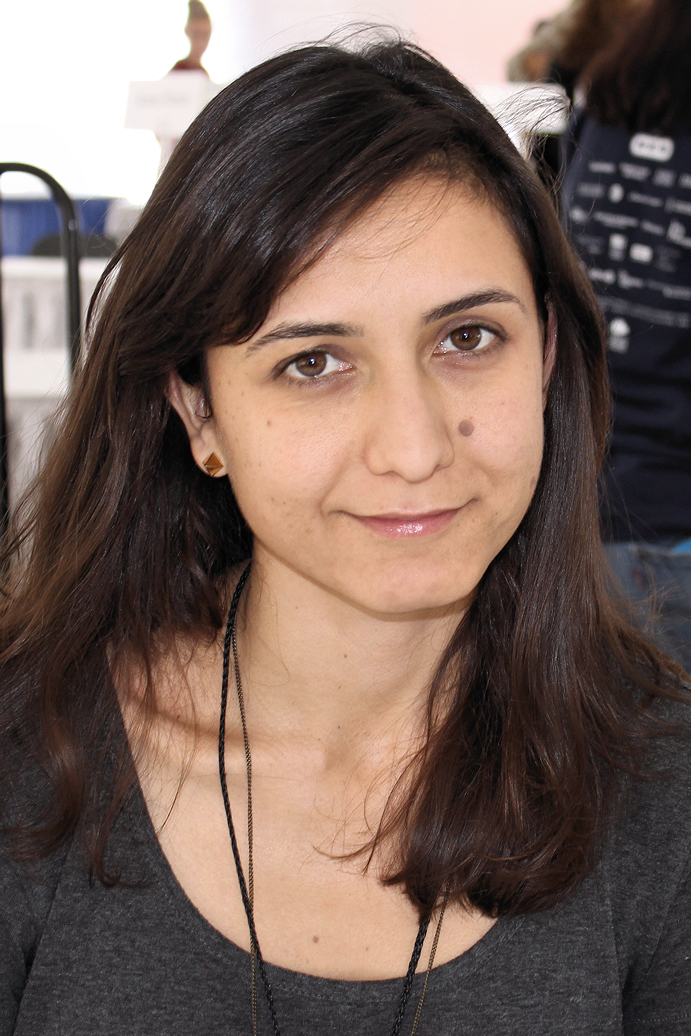
Ottessa Moshfegh (2011)

- Jandy Nelson (M.F.A. 1992) – author, I'll Give You the Sun
- Emily Nemens (A.B. 2005) – writer, editor, The Paris Review
- Naomi Novik (A.B. 1995) – fantasy author, His Majesty's Dragon
- Dan O'Brien (M.F.A. 1999) – playwright and poet, author of The Body of an American
- Nicanor Parra (1943–1945) – Chilean poet, author of Poemas y antipoemas, winner of the 2011 Miguel de Cervantes Prize
- S. J. Perelman (Class of 1925) – humorist, The New Yorker; author; Academy Award-winning screenwriter, Around the World in Eighty Days (1956) and the Marx Brothers films Monkey Business (1931) and Horse Feathers (1932)
- Nathaniel Philbrick (A.B. 1978) – nonfiction writer; National Book Award winner, author of In the Heart of the Sea
- Marilynne Robinson (A.B. 1966) – Pulitzer Prize and Orange Prize-winning author, Gilead, Housekeeping, Home

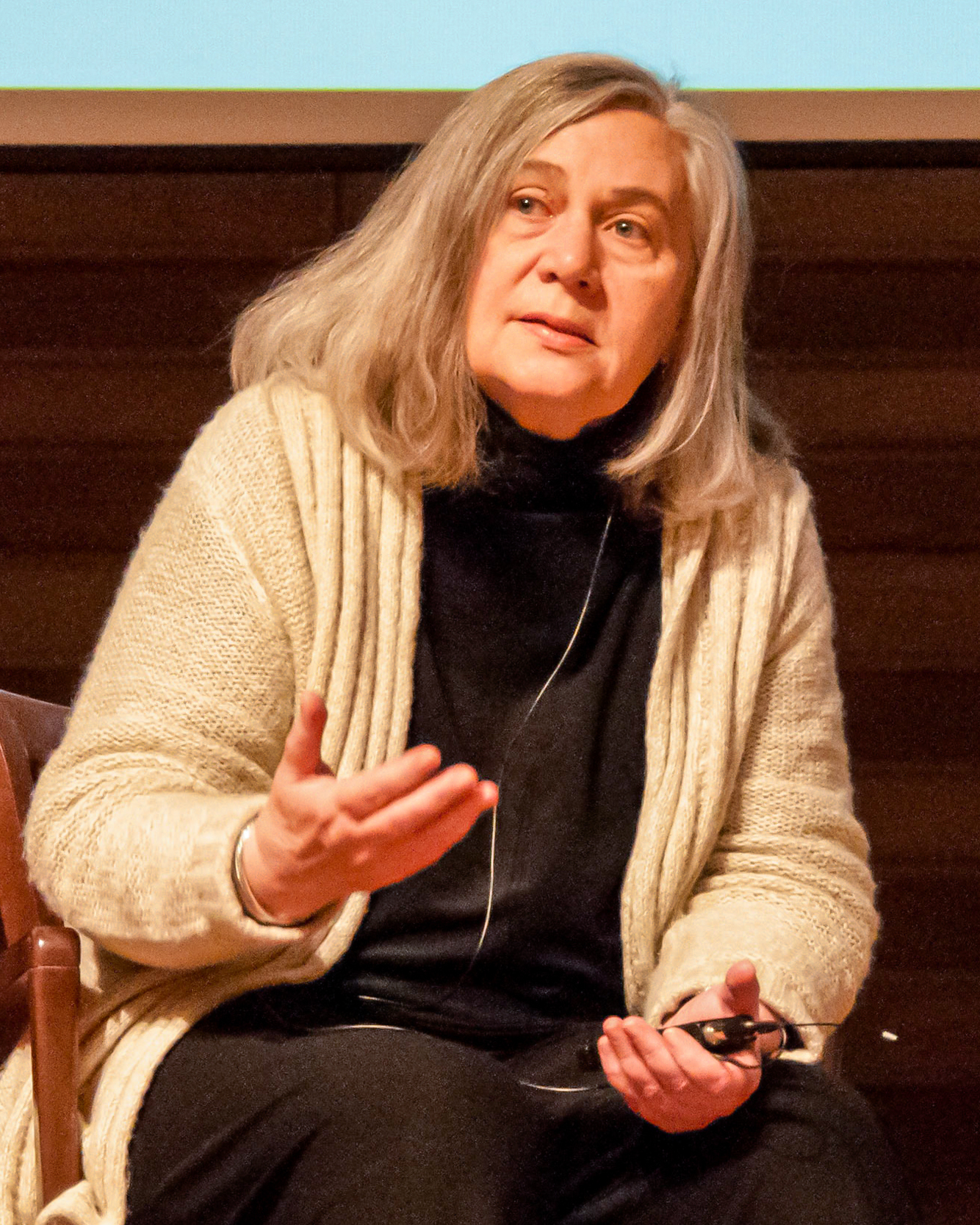
Marilynne Robinson (1966)

- Ariel Sabar (A.B. 1993) – author, National Book Critics Circle Award 2009 for My Father's Paradise
- Joanna Scott (M.A. 1985) – author, recipient of the MacArthur Foundation Fellowship and the Lannan Literary Award for Fiction
- Dana Schwartz (A.B. 2015) – author
- David Shenk (A.B. 1988) – author, The Forgetting, Data Smog, The Immortal Game
- Reginald Shepherd (M.F.A. 1988) – poet and author
- Daniel Sherrell (A.B. 2013) – author and climate organizer
- David Shields (A.B. 1978) – author, Reality Hunger
- Scott Snyder (A.B. 1998) – author of the story collection Voodoo Heart and writer of Vertigo Comics's ongoing original series American Vampire
- Gustaf Sobin (A.B. 1957) – poet, expatriate
- Brian Kim Stefans (M.F.A. 2006) – poet; professor of English, UCLA
- Nathanael West (Ph.B. 1924) – author, Miss Lonelyhearts, The Day of the Locust
- Meg Wolitzer (A.B. 1981) – author, The Wife, The Interestings, The Position
- Adelle Waldman (A.B. 1988) – author, The Love Affairs of Nathaniel P.
- Afaa M. Weaver (M.F.A. 1987) – poet, author, and editor
- Sherley Anne Williams (A.M. 1972) – poet and novelist
- Kevin Young (M.F.A. 1996) – poetry editor, New Yorker; director of the National Museum of African American History and Culture
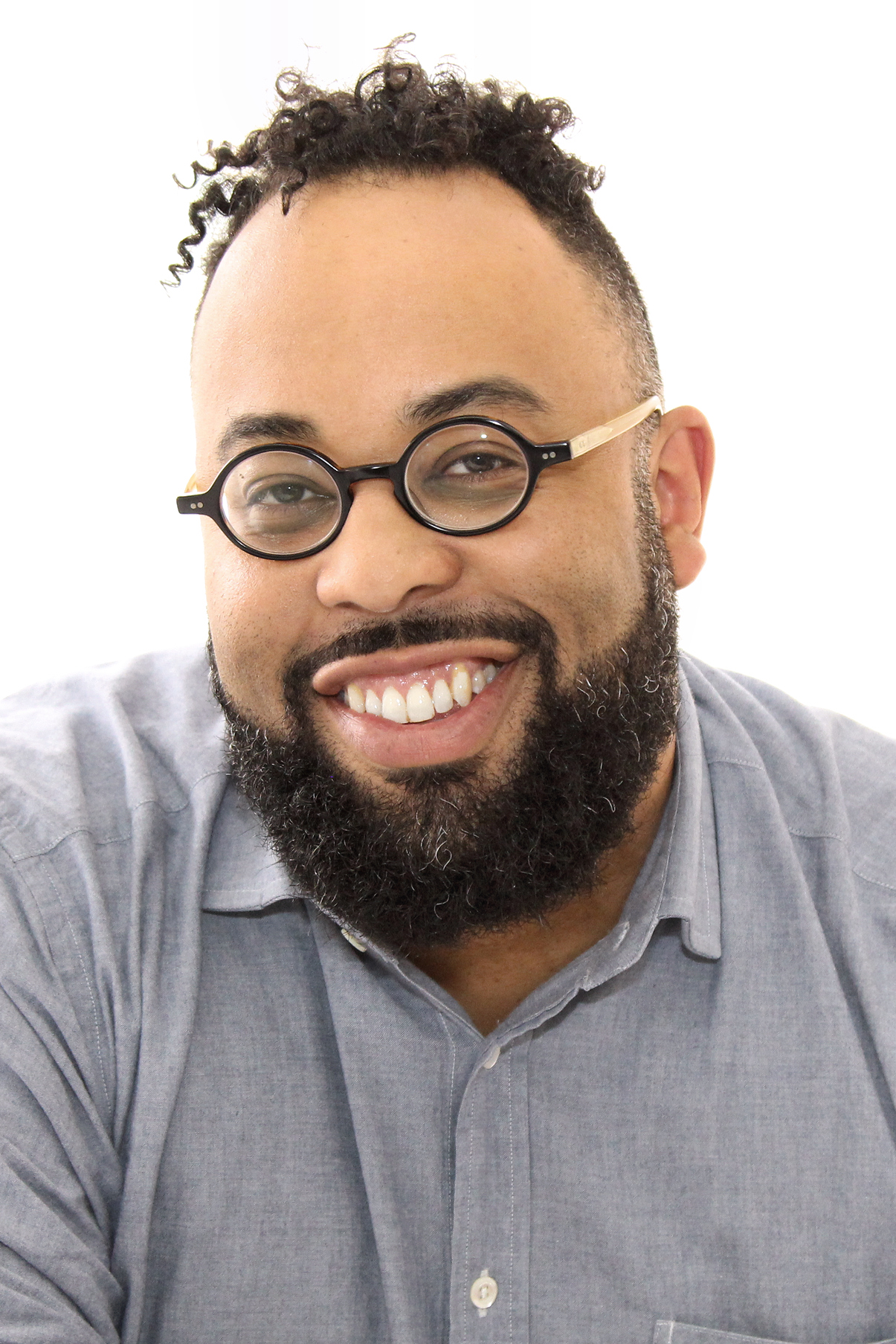
  Kevin Young (1996)
- Joshua Zeitz (A.M. 1998, Ph.D. 2002) – historian and commentator
- C Pam Zhang (2011) – author, How Much of These Hills Is Gold

== Medicine and public health ==
- Samuel Warren Abbott (A.M. 1858) – first medical examiner and first secretary of Massachusetts's first state board of health from 1886 to 1904
- Justin M. Andrews (Ph.B. 1923) – director of the Centers for Disease Control and Prevention, 2nd Director of the National Institute of Allergy and Infectious Diseases
- Aaron T. Beck (A.B. 1942) – "father of cognitive behavioral therapy"; founder of the Beck Institute for Cognitive Behavior Therapy at the University of Pennsylvania; winner of the Lasker Award
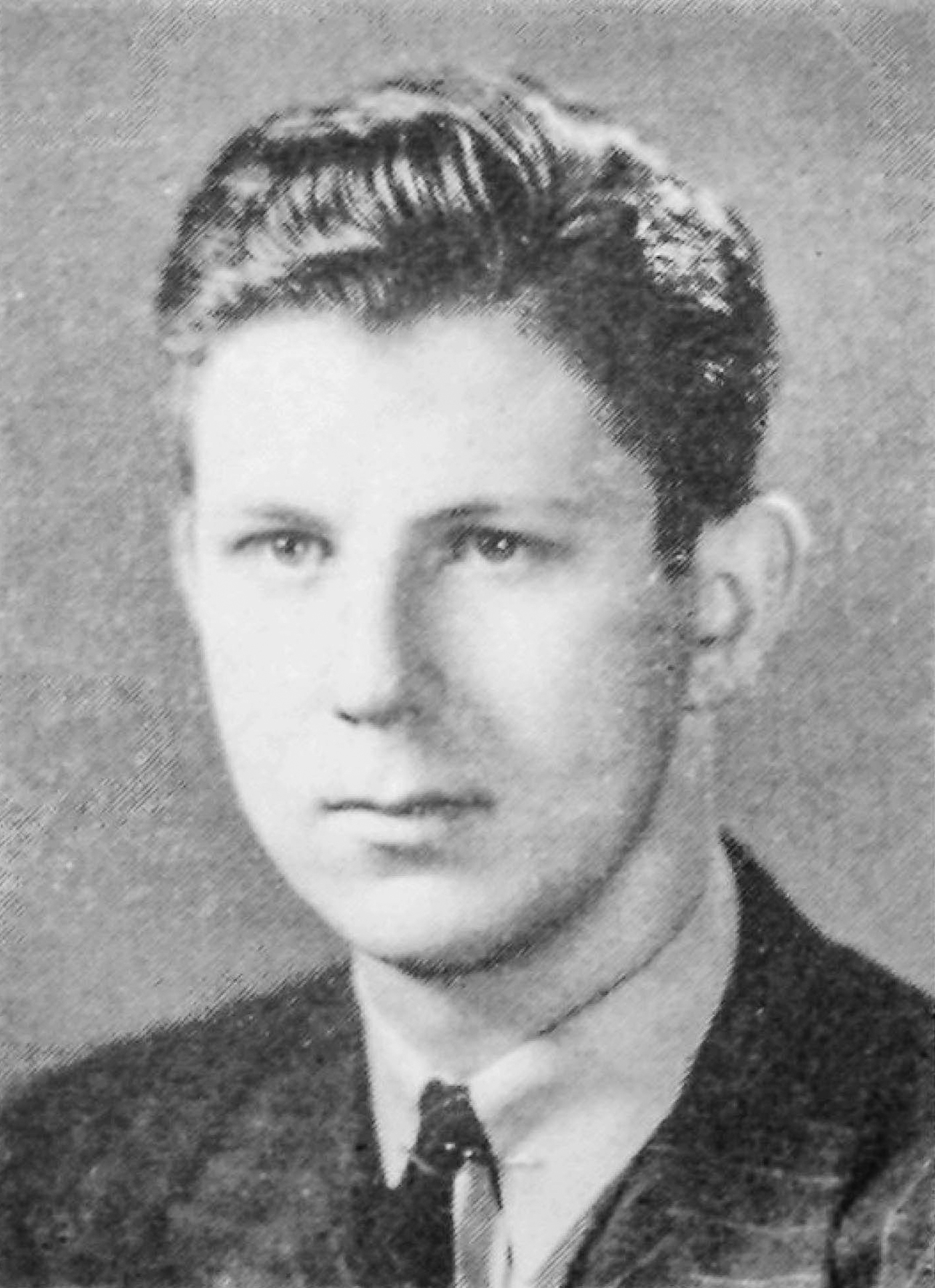
  Aaron T. Beck (1942)
- Deborah Benzil (1981) – vice chair and professor of Neurosurgery, Cleveland Clinic
- Seth Berkley (Sc.B. 1978, M.D. 1981) – CEO of GAVI, founder and former president and CEO of the International AIDS Vaccine Initiative
- Tom Catena (A.B. 1986) – Catholic medical missionary working in central Sudan

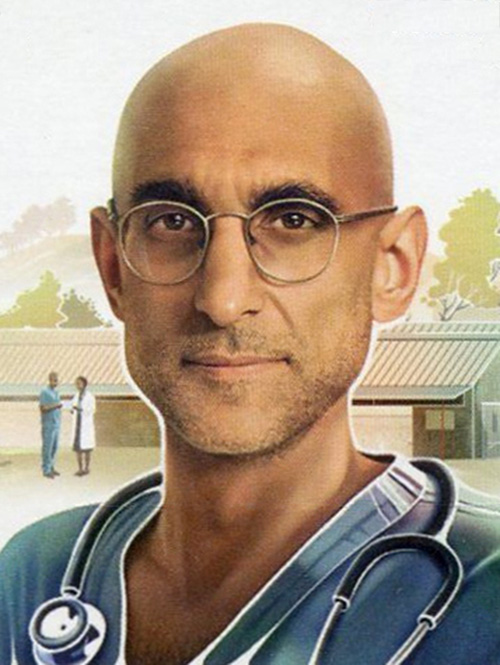
Tom Catena (1986)

- William A. Catterall (A.B. 1968) – chair and professor of Pharmacology, University of Washington School of Medicine, ForMemRS
- Charles V. Chapin (A.B. 1876) – Providence superintendent of health (1884–1932), pioneer in public health research and practice, first president of the American Epidemiological Society, professor of physiology at Brown
- Tina L. Cheng (A.B., M.D.) – chair of Pediatrics at Cincinnati Children's Hospital Medical Center
- Lynda Chin (A.B. 1988) – department chair and professor of genomic medicine, University of Texas MD Anderson Cancer Center; Scientific Director, MD Anderson Institute for Applied Cancer Science
- James J. Cimino (BSc 1977) – professor of Medicine and director, Informatics Institute, University of Alabama at Birmingham School of Medicine
- George E. Coghill (A.B. 1896, Ph.D. 1902) – anatomist
- Solomon Drowne (A.B. 1773) – physician, academic, and surgeon during the American Revolution
- Jacqueline A. French (M.D. 1982) – neurologist, professor, NYU Langone Health, and Chief Scientific Officer of the Epilepsy Foundation
- Nora Groce (Ph.D.) – Leonard Cheshire Chair of Disability and Inclusive Development, Institute of Epidemiology & Health, University College London
- Tina Hartert – Lulu H. Owen Endowed Chair in Medicine at Vanderbilt University
- Andrew C. Hecht (1989) – chief of Spine Surgery, Mount Sinai Hospital; associate professor of Orthopaedic Surgery and of Neurologic Surgery, Icahn School of Medicine
- Insoo Hyun (Ph.D. 1998) – professor of Bioethics, Case Western Reserve University School of Medicine; Senior Lecturer, Harvard Medical School
- Judith V. Jordan (1965) – co-director, Jean Baker Miller Institute; assistant professor of Psychology, Harvard Medical School
- Mark L. Kahn (A.B. 1984, M.D. 1987) – Edward S. Cooper, M.D./Norman Roosevelt and Elizabeth Meriwether McLure Professor of Medicine, Perelman School of Medicine at the University of Pennsylvania
- Ravi Kalhan (A.B. 1996) – director of the Asthma and COPD Program at Northwestern University Feinberg School of Medicine
- Philip Kantoff (1976, M.D. 1979) – former chairman of Medicine at Memorial Sloan Kettering Cancer Center, Jerome and Nancy Kohlberg Professor of Medicine Emeritus at Harvard Medical School
- William Williams Keen (A.B. 1859) – first American brain surgeon; president, Philadelphia School of Anatomy; president, American Surgical Association; president, American Medical Association; president, American Philosophical Society
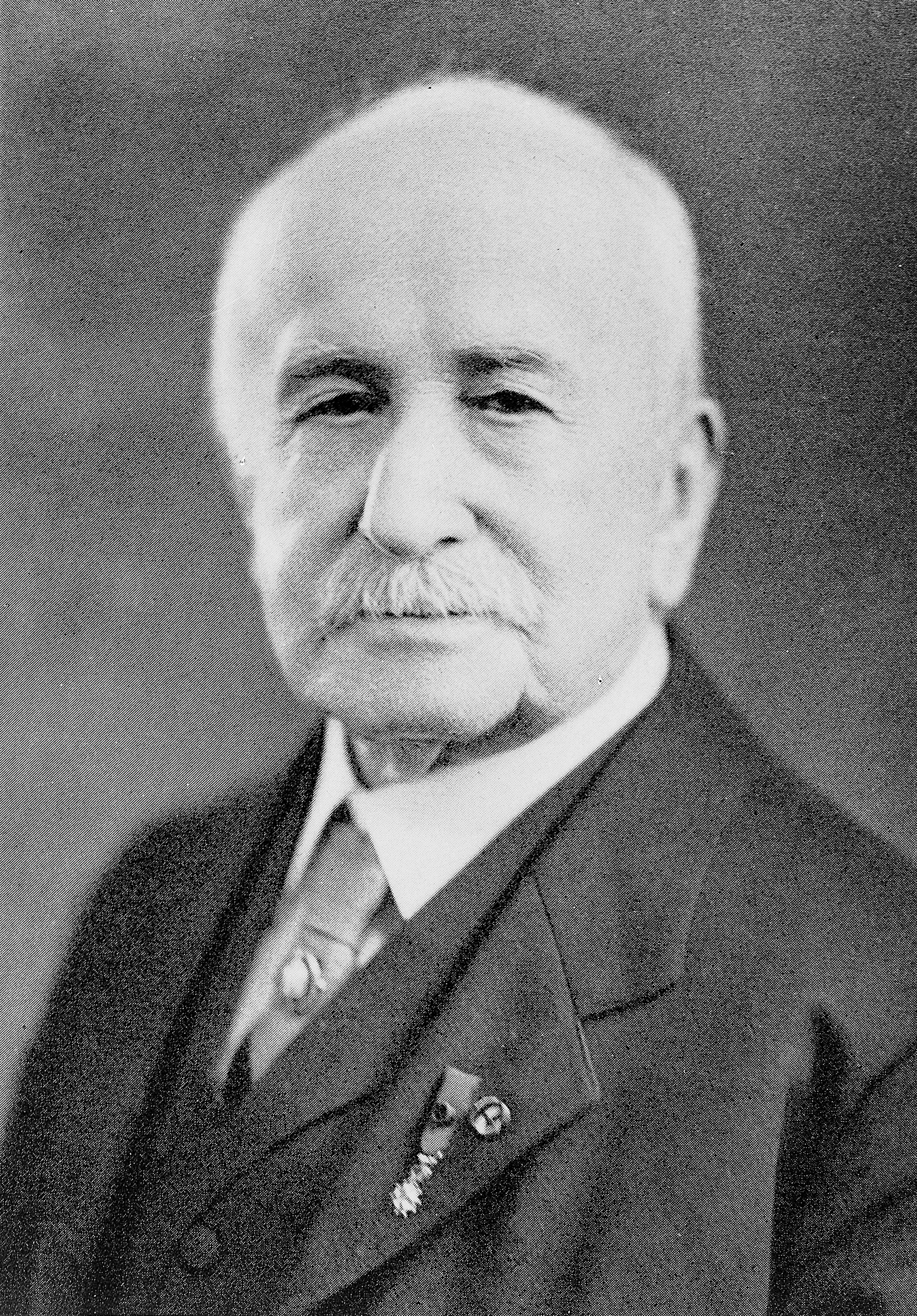
  William Williams Keen (1859)
- Linda Liau (A.B. 1987, Sc.B. 1987) – W. Eugene Stern Chair of the Department of Neurosurgery, David Geffen School of Medicine at UCLA
- Lloyd B. Minor (Sc.B. 1979, M.D. 1982) – Carl and Elizabeth Naumann Dean, Stanford University School of Medicine; former provost, Johns Hopkins University
- Christine Montross (M.D. 2006, M.MSc 2007) – associate professor of Psychiatry and Human Behavior, Alpert Medical School, Brown University
- Nawal M. Nour (A.B. 1984) – chair of the Department of Obstetrics and Gynecology, Brigham and Women's Hospital; Kate Macy Ladd Endowed Professor, Harvard Medical School
- Michael Polydefkis (B.Sc. 1988) – professor of Neurology and director, Cutaneous Nerve Lab, Johns Hopkins University School of Medicine; Howard Hughes Medical Institute Investigator
- Megan Ranney (M.P.H. 2010) – dean and C.-E. A. Winslow Professor of Public Health, Yale School of Public Health

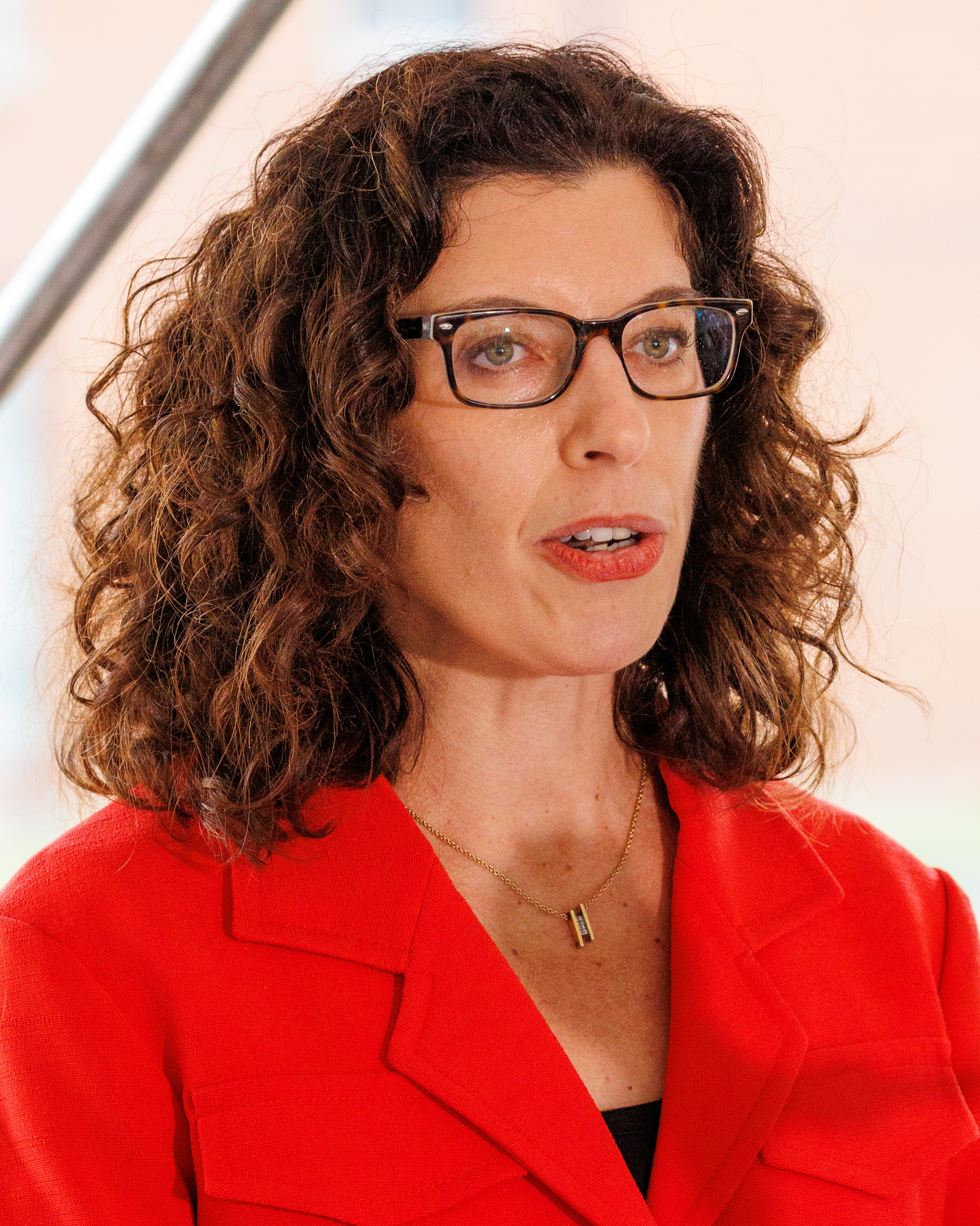
Megan Ranney (2010)

- Joan Reede (Sc.B. 1976) – physician, dean for Diversity and Community Partnership, Harvard Medical School
- Griffin P. Rodgers (Sc.B. 1976, M.MSc & M.D. 1979) – director of the National Institute of Diabetes and Digestive and Kidney Diseases
- Matthew Sacchet (A.B. 2010) – assistant professor, Department of Psychiatry, Harvard Medical School
- Sally Satel (M.D. 1984) – lecturer in Psychiatry, Yale School of Medicine
- Erica Schwartz (Sc.B. 1994, M.D. 1998) – deputy surgeon general of the United States (2019–2021)
- Harry Selker (M.D. 1978) – dean, Clinical and Translational Science Institute, Tufts University School of Medicine
- Manny Sethi (A.B. 2000) – physician, president and founder, Healthy Tennessee
- Meena Seshamani (A.B. 1997) – Maryland Secretary of Health (2025–)
- Neel Shah (Sc.B. 2004, M.D. 2009) – executive director of Costs of Care, assistant professor at Harvard Medical School
- Jerome K. Sherman (Sc.B. 1947) – professor of Biology, University of Arkansas

== Military ==
- Charles Wheaton Abbot Jr. (A.M. 1922) – adjutant general of Rhode Island, commander of the 1st Rhode Island Infantry Regiment during Spanish–American War
- John F. Aiso (1931) – highest-ranking Japanese American in the U.S. Army during World War II, first Japanese American judge in the contiguous U.S.
- Charles Henry Alden (A.M. 1856) – 1st president, Army Medical School
- David A. Burchinal (A.B. 1938) – United States Air Force four-star general and deputy commander in chief, United States European Command
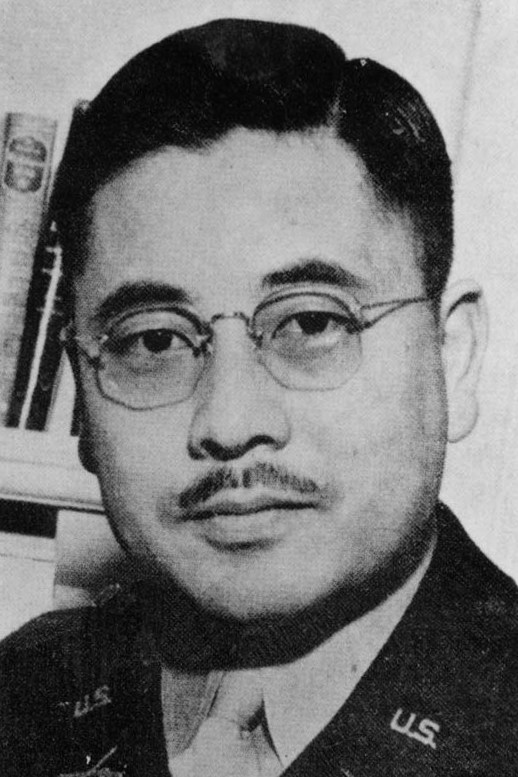
  John F. Aiso (1931)
- G. Edward Buxton (Ph.B. 1902) – commanding officer of Sergeant Alvin C. York; first assistant director of the OSS
- William C. Chase (A.B. 1916) – major general during World War II
- James M. Cutts (A.M. 1856) – Soldier during the American Civil War; recipient of the Medal of Honor
- Thomas Ewing Jr. (Class of 1856) – Union Army general during the American Civil War, first chief justice of Kansas
- Ployer Peter Hill (Sc.B. 1916) – test pilot, namesake of Hill Air Force Base in Utah
- Miles Imlay (Class of 1925) – rear admiral, United States Coast Guard
- James M. Keck (Class of 1943) – lieutenant general, United States Air Force
- Royal B. Lord (Sc.B. 1919) – major general, United States Army
- William R. Maloney (A.B. 1951) – lieutenant general, United States Marine Corps
- John Eaton Tourtellotte – brevet brigadier general, United States Army during the American Civil War
- Adin Ballou Underwood (1849) – brevet major general, United States Army during the American Civil War
- James Mitchell Varnum (A.B. 1769) – general in the Continental Army during the American Revolutionary War and justice of the Supreme Court of the Northwest Territory
- Frank Wheaton (Class of 1853) – major general during the American Civil War

== Performing arts ==
=== Music ===
- Sean Altman (A.B. 1983) – founding tenor member of Rockapella, known for the theme song of Where in the World is Carmen Sandiego?
- Charles Ansbacher (1965) – founder and conductor of the Boston Landmarks Orchestra
- MC Paul Barman (A.B. 1997) – cult rapper
- Marco Beltrami (Sc.B. 1988) – two-time Academy Award-nominated film score composer, Scream (1996), Resident Evil (2002), Terminator 3: Rise of the Machines (2003), Hellboy (2004), Live Free or Die Hard (2007), 3:10 to Yuma (2007), Max Payne (2008), Mesrine (2008), The Hurt Locker (2009), The Wolverine (2013), Warm Bodies (2013), World War Z (2013), Free Solo (2018), Ford v Ferrari (2019), and the video game Fortnite
- Clare Burson (1997) – singer-songwriter
- David Buskin (A.B 1965) – singer-songwriter (Modern Man), jingle composer, Clio Award winner (1983)
- Julia Cafritz – musician, known for Pussy Galore
- Wendy Carlos (A.B. 1962) – composer and electronic musician, Switched-On Bach (1968); film score composer, A Clockwork Orange (1971), Tron (1982)

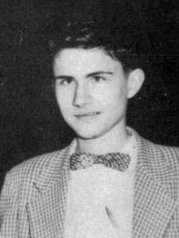
Wendy Carlos (1962)

- Mary Chapin Carpenter (A.B. 1981) – country singer-songwriter
- Chubb Rock – rapper and radio host
- Joel Cohen (A.B. 1963) – director of the Boston Camerata
- Alvin Curran (A.B. 1960) – avant-garde composer
- Catie Curtis (1987) – contemporary folk singer-songwriter
- Dave Dederer (A.B.) – guitarist, singer, and founding member of rock band The presidents of the United States of America
- Thomas DeLio (Ph.D. 1979) – Professor of Music Theory and Composition, University of Maryland, College Park
- Shelby Gaines (1991) – musician and artist
- Tucker Halpern (2013) – musician and DJ, one half of electronic pop group Sofi Tukker
- Dhani Harrison (2001) – son of George Harrison, composer, guitarist
- Sophie Hawley-Weld (2014) – musician, one half of electronic pop group Sofi Tukker
- Lili Haydn (1992) – singer-songwriter, violinist
- Dave Harrington (2009) – multi-instrumentalist and producer
- Lingua Ignota (M.F.A. 2016) – multidisciplinary artist and instrumentalist
- Nicolás Jaar (A.B. 2012) – avant-garde electronic music producer, owner and founder of record label and art house Clown & Sunset

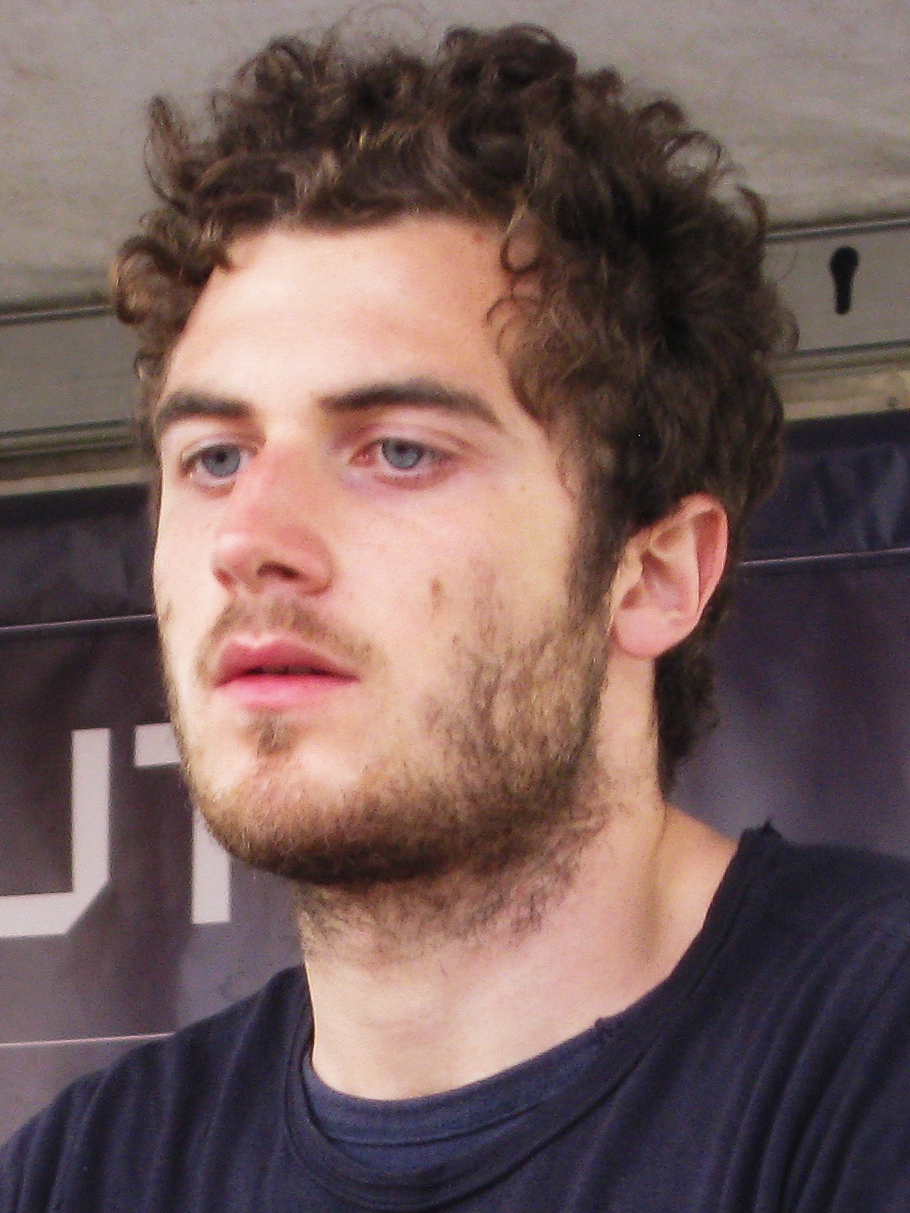
Nicolás Jaar (2012)

- Gabriel Kahane (2003) – singer-songwriter
- Elliott Kerman (Sc.B. 1981) – founding baritone member of Rockapella
- Tad Kinchla (1995) – bassist for jam band Blues Traveler
- Richard Kostelanetz (A.B. 1962) – electro-acoustic composer (New York City Oratorio, America's Game), writer on innovative musics and musicians
- Damian Kulash (A.B. 1998) – lead singer and founding member of indie rock band OK Go
- Erich Kunzel (1964) – conductor, Cincinnati Pops Orchestra
- Lawrence – soul-pop group founded by Clyde Lawrence '15 and Gracie Lawrence (Class of 2020)
- Lisa Loeb (A.B. 1990) – Grammy Award-winning alternative singer-songwriter; first unsigned artist to score a #1 hit song on the American charts, with "Stay (I Missed You)" from the film Reality Bites

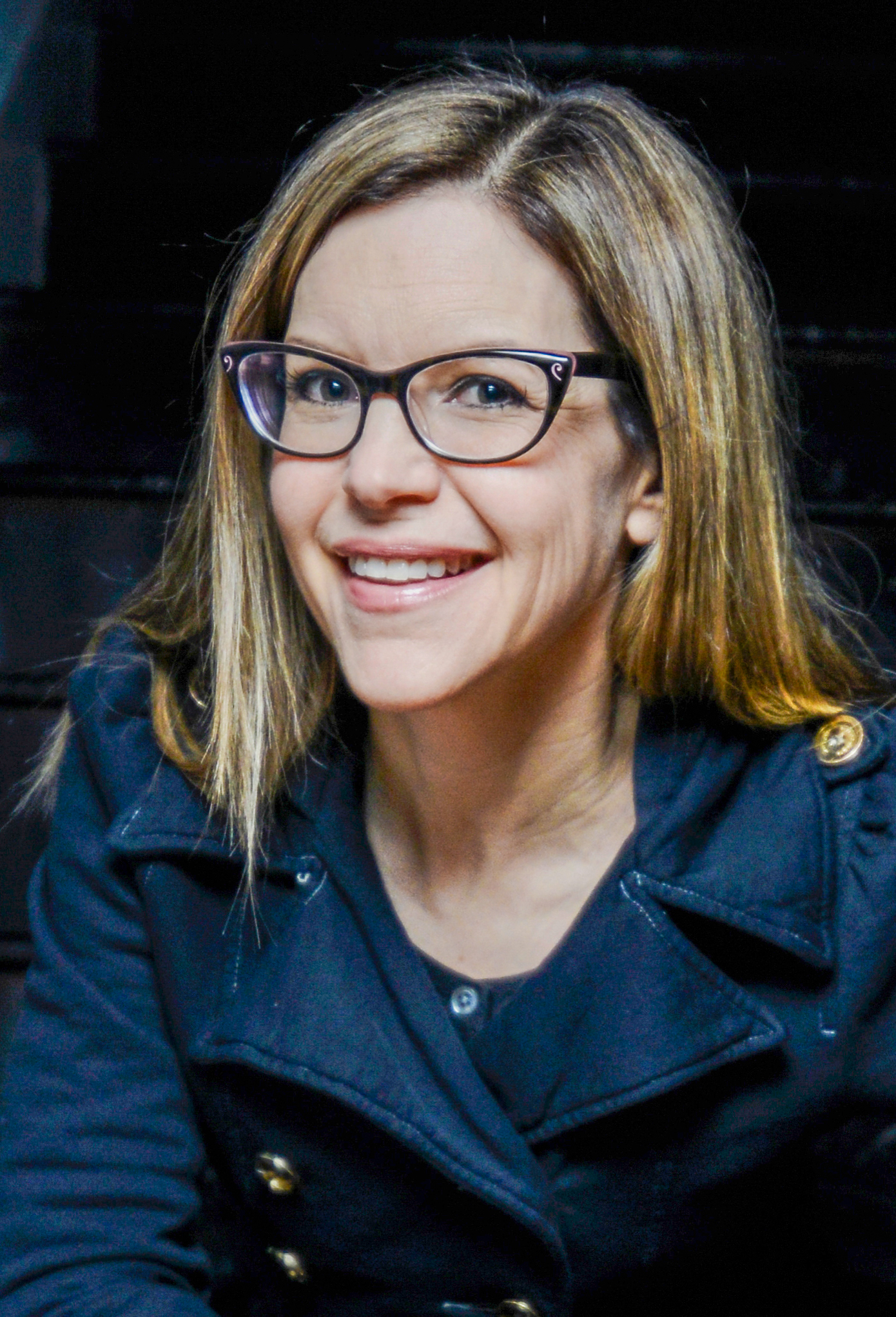
Lisa Loeb (1990)

- The Low Anthem – indie folk band that includes alums Ben Knox Miller (2006), Jeff Prystowsky (2006) and Jocie Adams
- Erin McKeown (2000) – folk singer-songwriter
- Elizabeth Mitchell (1990) – musician, member of indie folk–pop band Ida; played in a band with Lisa Loeb and Duncan Sheik while at Brown
- Will Oldham (Class of 1992) – indie rock/alternative country singer-songwriter who also performs under the names Bonnie "Prince" Billy and Palace
- Elvis Perkins (1995) – singer-songwriter
- Navah Perlman (A.B. 1992) – concert pianist; daughter of Itzhak Perlman
- Dan Prothero – producer / engineer and owner of Fog City Records
- The Range – DJ and electronic musician
- Sebastian Ruth (A.B. 1997) – violinist, 2010 MacArthur Fellow and faculty member of the Yale School of Music
- Susan Salms-Moss (A.B. 1967) – soprano
- Theodore Shapiro (A.B. 1993) – film score composer, State and Main (2000), Old School (2003), Starsky & Hutch (2004), The Devil Wears Prada (2006), Marley & Me (2008), Tropic Thunder (2008), I Love You, Man (2008), We're the Millers (2013), The Secret Life of Walter Mitty (2013), Ghostbusters (2016), The Eyes of Tammy Faye (2021), Severance (2022)
- Duncan Sheik (A.B. 1992) – alternative rock singer-songwriter; top 10 hit for the song "Barely Breathing"; Grammy and two-time Tony Award-winning composer, Spring Awakening
- Sasha Spielberg (2012) – musician, Wardell; daughter of Steven Spielberg and Kate Capshaw

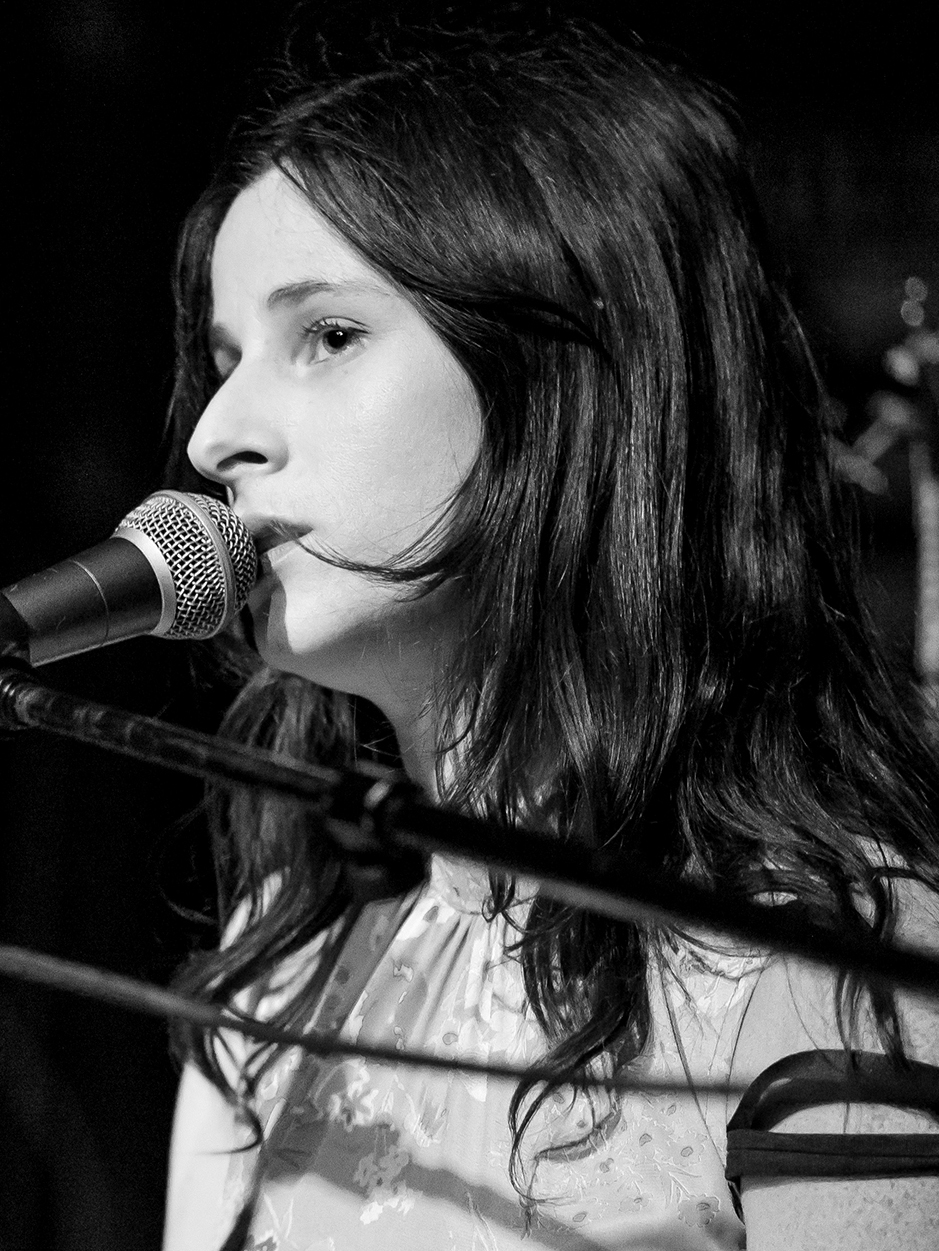
Sasha Spielberg (2012)

- Susie Suh (A.B. 2002) – alternative rock singer-songwriter
- Saleka (A.B. 2018) – R&B singer-songwriter; daughter of M. Night Shyamalan
- Jon Spencer – singer and composer, known for Pussy Galore, The Jon Spencer Blues Explosion, and Boss Hog
- Sally Taylor (1996) – musician, daughter of Carly Simon and James Taylor
- Gwyneth Walker (A.B. 1967) – composer
- J. Mayo Williams (1920) – first African-American producer at a major record label
- Jamila Woods (A.B. 2011) – singer, songwriter and poet signed to Jagajaguwar
- ZOX – SideOneDummy recording artist, composed of John Zox '02, Eli Miller '02, Daniel Edinberg '02, and Spencer Swain

=== Film ===
- Andrew Ahn (2008) – director, Spa Night, Driveways, Fire Island
- Eva Amurri (2007) – actress, Loving Annabelle, Saved!, The Banger Sisters; daughter of Susan Sarandon
- Scott E. Anderson (Sc.B. 1986) – Academy Award-winning visual effects supervisor, Babe, and nominee Starship Troopers, Hollow Man
- Bess Armstrong (1975) – actress, The Four Seasons (1981), High Road to China
- Raymond J. Barry (A.B) – actor, Born on the Fourth of July, Steel City
- David Bartis (A.B. 1988) – producer, The Wall, Edge of Tomorrow, Fair Game
- Randall Batinkoff (1990) – actor, For Keeps, School Ties
- Steve Bloom (A.B. 1978) – screenwriter, James and the Giant Peach, The Sure Thing, Tall Tale, Jack Frost
- Joseph Bologna – actor, My Favorite Year, Blame It on Rio
- Sara Colangelo (A.B. 2001) – writer and director, Little Accidents, Worth
- David Conrad (A.B. 1990) – actor, Wedding Crashers, Ghost Whisperer
- Michael Costigan (1990) – producer, Brokeback Mountain, American Gangster, Under the Banner of Heaven
- Louis Ozawa Changchien (M.F.A. 2006) – actor, Predators, The Bourne Legacy, Bosch
- Yaya Da Costa (A.B. 2004) – actress, Take the Lead, Honeydripper, The Kids Are All Right, The Butler; fashion model

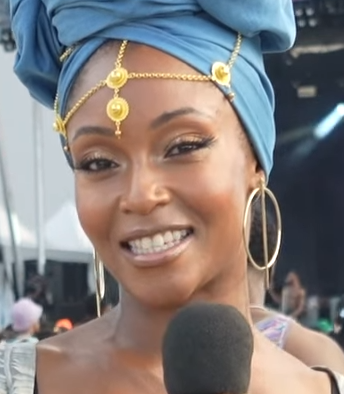
Yaya Da Costa (2004)

- Lucy DeVito (A.B. 2005) – actress, Melissa and Joey, Leaves of Grass
- Tom Dey (A.B. 1987) – director, Shanghai Noon, Showtime, Failure to Launch, Marmaduke, Wedding Season
- Alice Drummond (A.B. 1950) – actress, Awakenings, Nobody's Fool (1994), Doubt (2008)
- Tanaz Eshaghian (born 1974), Iranian-born American documentary filmmaker – Be Like Others, Love Crimes of Kabul
- Richard Fleischer (A.B. 1939) – director, 20,000 Leagues Under the Sea (1954), The Narrow Margin, Fantastic Voyage, Tora! Tora! Tora!, The Boston Strangler, Doctor Dolittle, Mandingo, Soylent Green; Academy Award-winning documentary producer, Design for Death
- Jomo Fray (A.B.) – cinematographer, Nickel Boys
- Sarah Friedland (A.B. 2014) – director, Familiar Touch
- Josh Friedman (1989) – screenwriter, War of the Worlds, The Black Dahlia; executive producer, Terminator: The Sarah Connor Chronicles; developer, Snowpiercer
- Liz Garbus (A.B. 1992) – 2-time Academy Award-nominated documentary filmmaker, What Happened, Miss Simone?, The Farm: Angola, USA, Killing in the Name, All In: The Fight for Democracy, Ghosts of Abu Ghraib
- Francesca Gregorini (A.B. 1990) – Italian-American writer and film director
- Davis Guggenheim (1986) – Academy Award-winning documentary film director, An Inconvenient Truth, It Might Get Loud, and Waiting for "Superman"; film director for Gracie, Gossip (2000), and episodes of 24, Alias, The Shield, ER, NYPD Blue

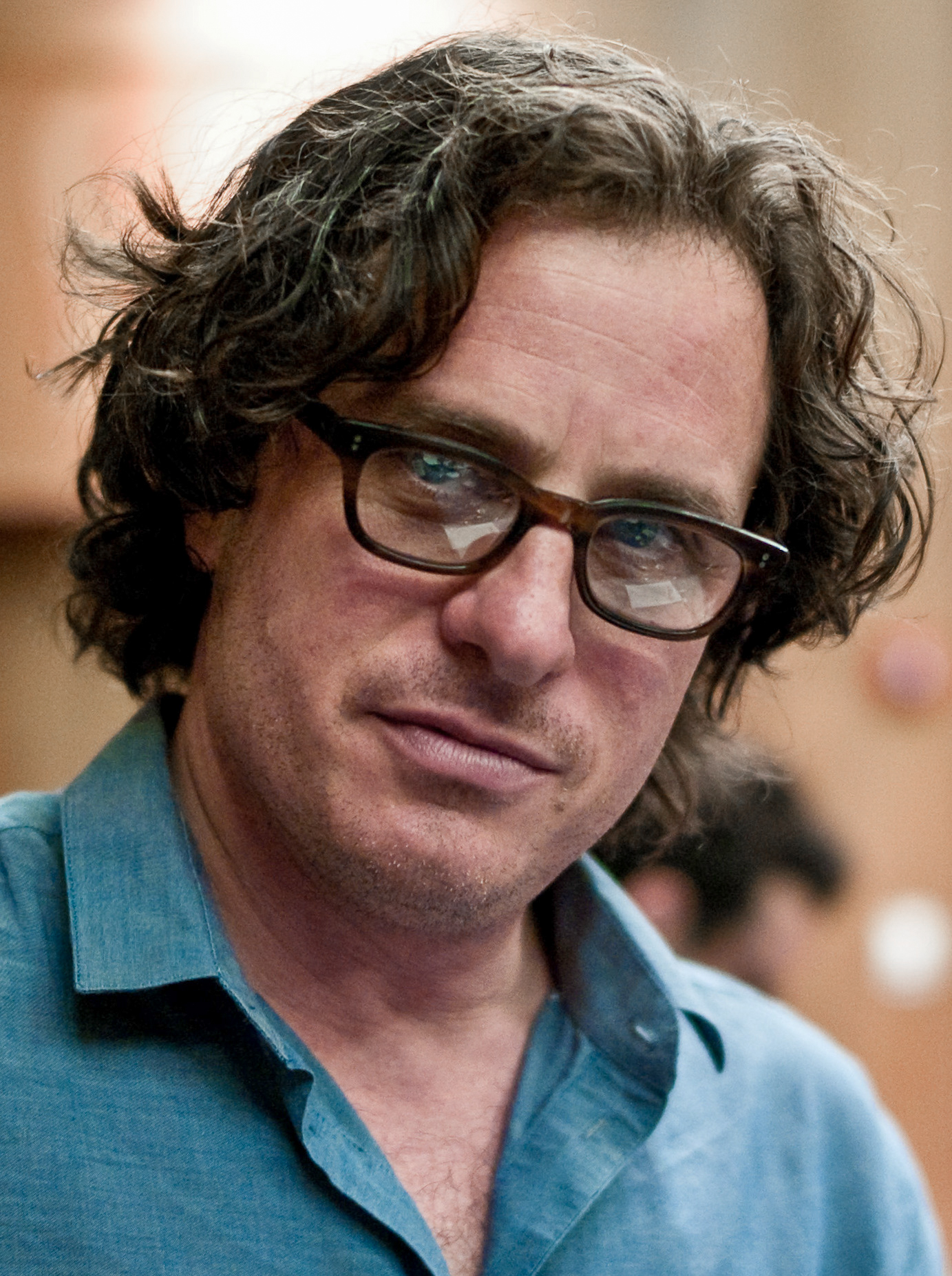
Davis Guggenheim (1986)

- John Hamburg (A.B. 1992) – director, I Love You, Man, Along Came Polly; screenwriter, Zoolander, Meet the Parents, Meet the Fockers
- Josh Hamilton (1991) – actor, Eighth Grade, 13 Reasons Why
- Hill Harper (A.B. 1988) – actor, Constellation, Lackawanna Blues, CSI: NY
- Phil Hay – screenwriter, Destroyer, The Invitation, Ride Along
- Todd Haynes (A.B. 1983) – Academy Award-nominated writer/director, Mildred Pierce, I'm Not There, Far from Heaven, Velvet Goldmine, Safe (1995), Poison, Dark Waters, The Velvet Underground

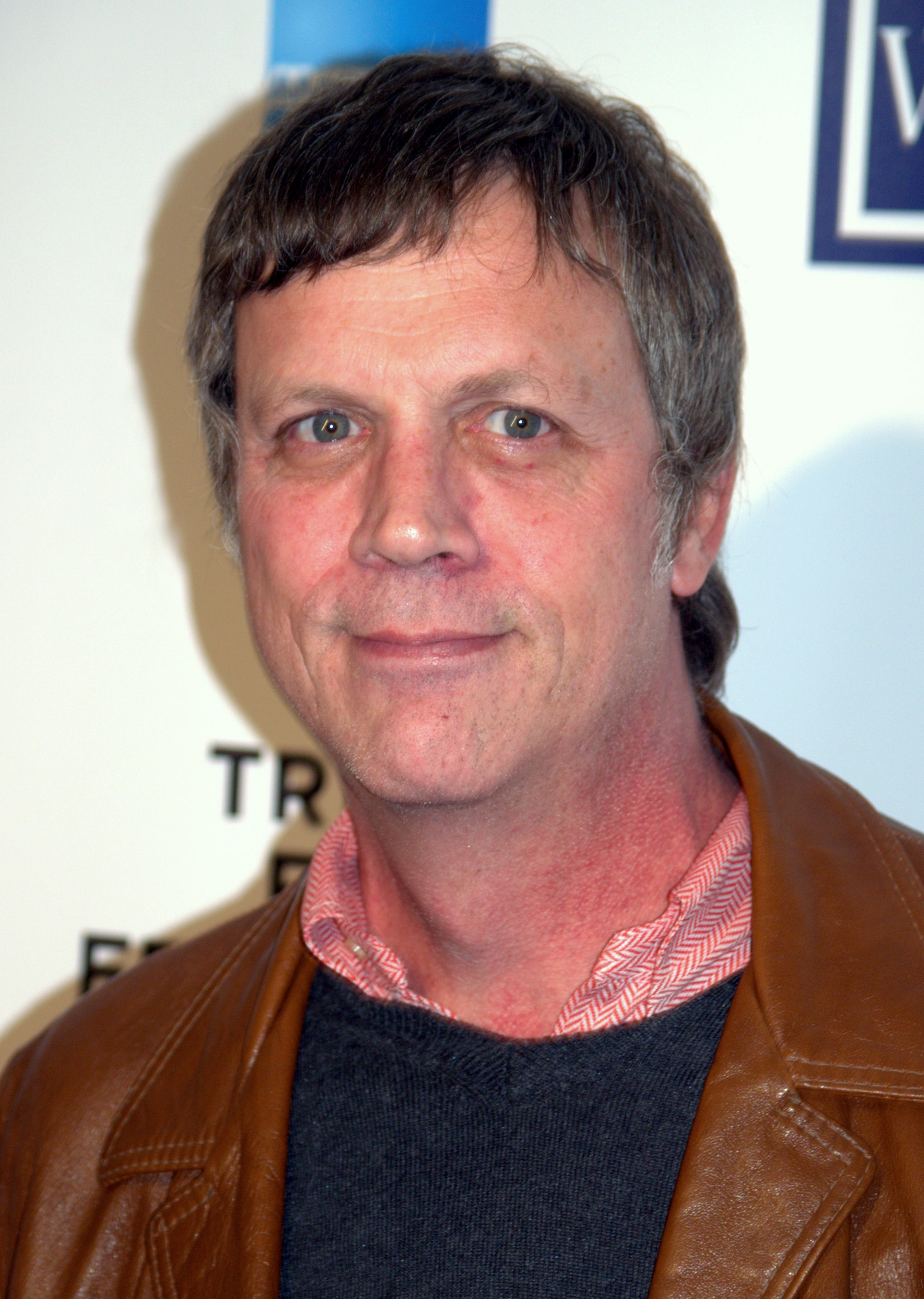
Todd Haynes (1983)

- David Hedison (Class of 1949) – film, television, and stage actor
- Sean Hood (1988) – screenwriter, Conan the Barbarian, Halloween: Resurrection, Cursed, Cube 2: Hypercube
- Ruth Hussey (A.B. 1933) – Academy Award-nominated actress, The Philadelphia Story
- Oren Jacoby (1977) – Academy Award-nominated documentarian, Constantine's Sword
- Kirsten Johnson (1987) – documentarian, director, and cinematographer, Dick Johnson Is Dead, Cameraperson
- Rory Kennedy (A.B. 1991) – independent filmmaker, Moxie Firecracker Films, Inc.; Ghosts of Abu Ghraib
- Simon Kinberg (A.B. 1995) – screenwriter and producer, X-Men: Days of Future Past, Sherlock Holmes, Jumper (2008), X-Men: The Last Stand, Mr. & Mrs. Smith (2005)
- Alison Klayman (A.B. 2006) – documentary filmmaker and journalist, Ai Weiwei: Never Sorry
- Paul Kowalski (A.B. 2004) – film director and screenwriter, Paper Tiger (2020)
- John Krasinski (A.B. 2001) – playwright, actor, director, and producer, The Office, Jack Ryan, A Quiet Place, A Quiet Place Part II, Brief Interviews with Hideous Men, License to Wed, 13 Hours: The Secret Soldiers of Benghazi, IF; selected as People magazine's 2024 Sexiest Man Alive

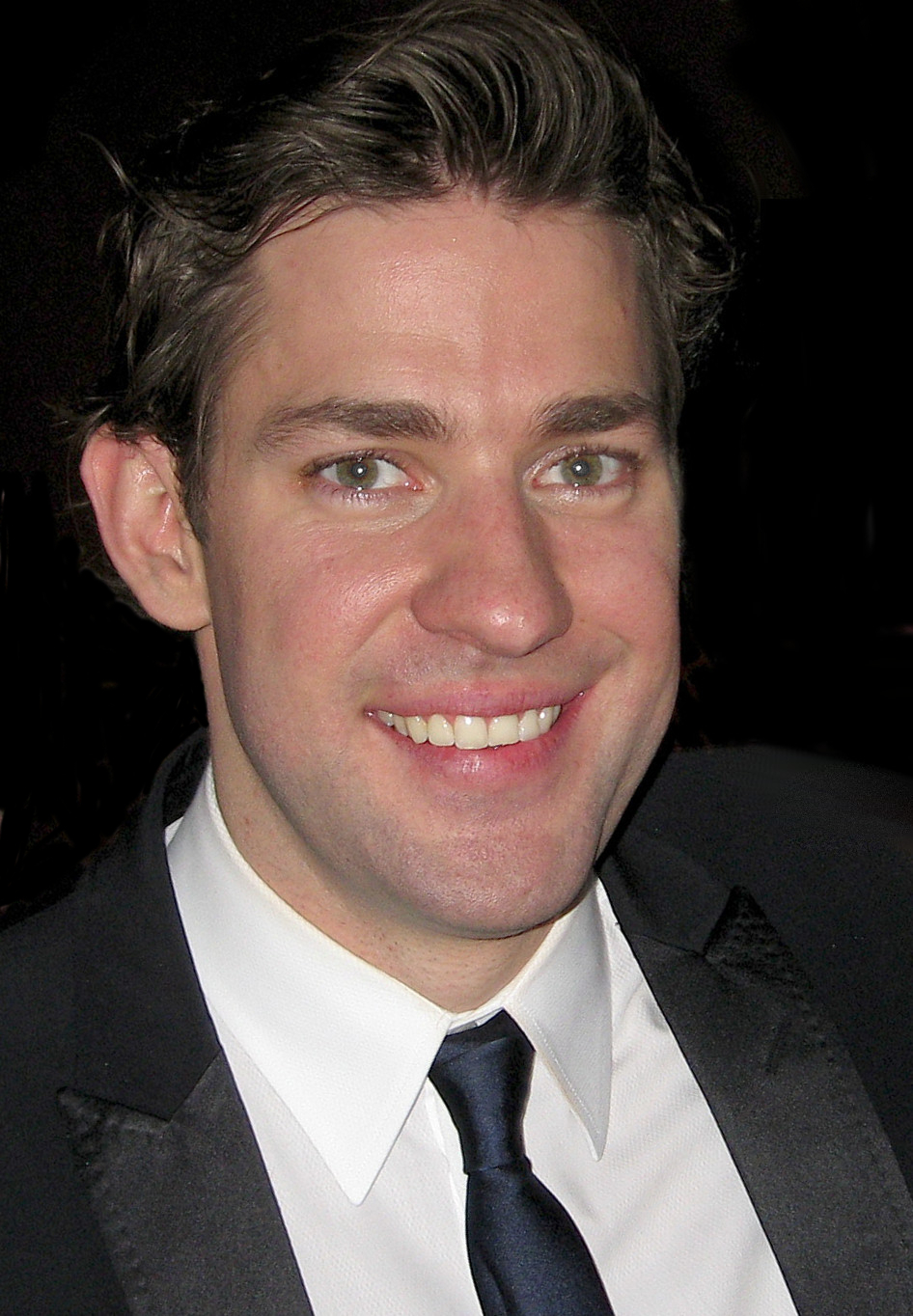
John Krasinski (2001)

- Ellen Kuras (1981) – cinematographer, Eternal Sunshine of the Spotless Mind, Blow, He Got Game, Summer of Sam, Be Kind Rewind
- Justin Kuritzkes (2012) – playwright and screenwriter, Challengers
- Jonathan Levine (A.B. 2000) – writer/director, Warm Bodies, 50/50 (2011), The Wackness, All The Boys Love Mandy Lane
- Doug Liman (A.B. 1988) – director and producer, The O.C., Edge of Tomorrow, Fair Game (2010),Jumper (2008), Mr. & Mrs. Smith (2005), The Bourne Identity (2002), The Bourne Supremacy, Go (1999), Swingers (1996)
- Laura Linney (A.B. 1986) – three-time Academy Award and two-time Tony Award-nominated actress, The Big C, The Savages, The Nanny Diaries, The Squid and the Whale, The Exorcism of Emily Rose, Kinsey, Mystic River, Love Actually, You Can Count on Me, The Truman Show, Absolute Power, Primal Fear, Ozark

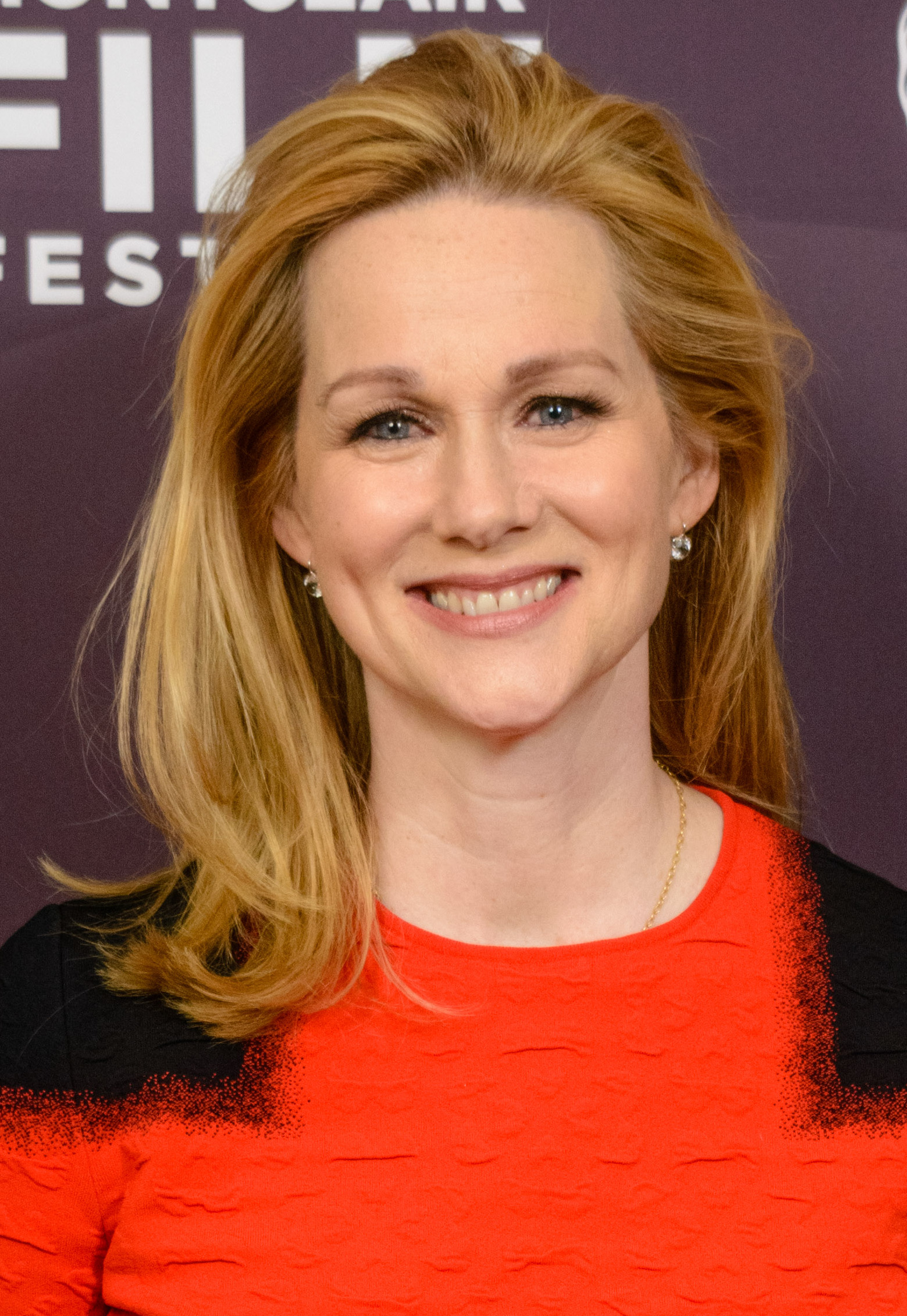
Laura Linney (1986)

- Kurt Luedtke (A.B. 1961) – Academy Award-winning screenwriter, Out of Africa
- Kátia Lund (A.B. 1989) – co-director, Cidade de Deus (City of God) (2002)
- George Macready (A.B. 1921) – actor of film, stage, and television, Tora! Tora! Tora!, Paths of Glory
- Eli Marienthal (Class of 2008) – actor, Confessions of a Teenage Drama Queen, The Iron Giant, Jack Frost (1998)
- Matt Manfredi – screenwriter, Crazy/Beautiful, Ride Along, The Mysterious Benedict Society
- Ross McElwee (A.B. 1970) – documentary filmmaker, Sherman's March (1986) and Bright Leaves
- Leah Meyerhoff (A.B. 2001) – Student Academy Award-nominated writer/director, Twitch
- Tim Blake Nelson (A.B. 1986) – actor, Lincoln (2012), The Incredible Hulk, Syriana, Minority Report, O Brother, Where Art Thou?, The Thin Red Line (1998); director, Leaves of Grass, O, The Grey Zone

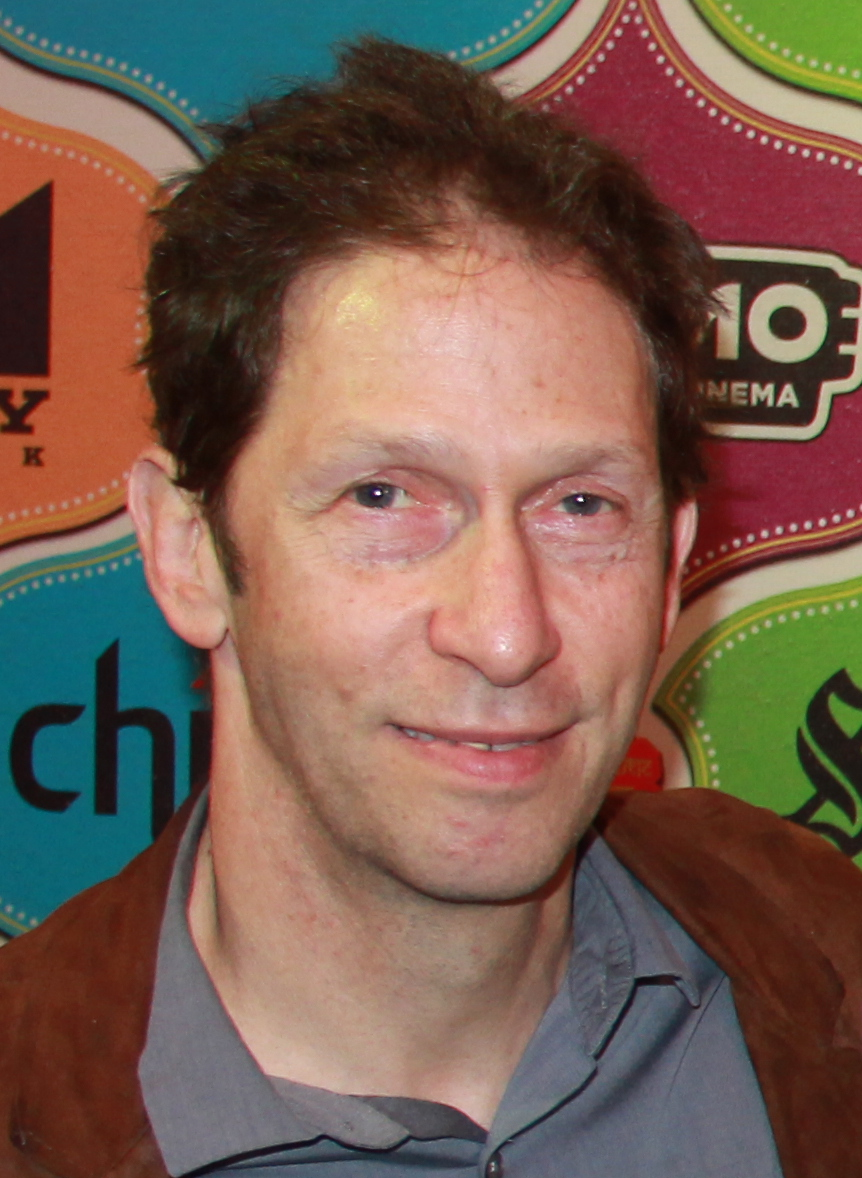
Tim Blake Nelson (1986)

- Lorraine Nicholson (2012) – actress, Soul Surfer, daughter of Jack Nicholson
- Matthew Reeve (2002) – producer and director, son of Christopher Reeve
- Yoruba Richen (A.B. 1994) – film director, screenwriter, and producer
- Angela Robinson (A.B. 1992) – director, Herbie: Fully Loaded, D.E.B.S. (2003), D.E.B.S. (2004)
- Jane Rosenthal – founder of the Tribeca Film Festival
- Danny Rubin (A.B. 1979) – screenwriter, Groundhog Day
- Michael Showalter (A.B. 1992) – actor/writer/director, Wet Hot American Summer, The Baxter and the series The State, Stella and Michael & Michael Have Issues
- Leelee Sobieski (Class of 2005) – actress, Eyes Wide Shut, Never Been Kissed, Here on Earth, Joy Ride (2001), The Glass House (2001), Wicker Man (2006), 88 Minutes, Public Enemies (2009); nominated for an Emmy for Joan of Arc

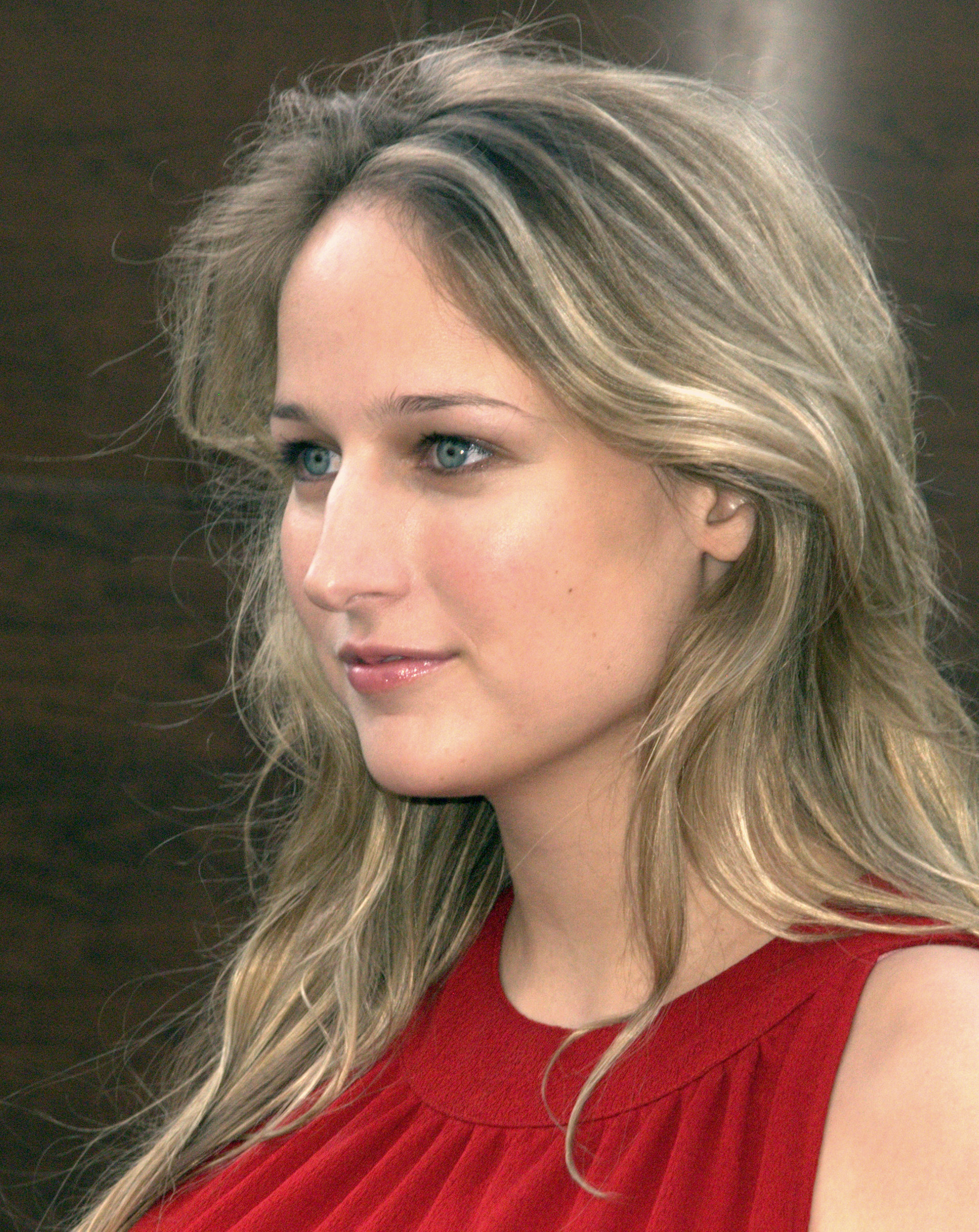
Leelee Sobieski

- Alison Stewart (A.B. 1988) – radio and television journalist; filmmaker
- Matthew Sussman – actor, documentary filmmaker
- Sara Tanaka (A.B. 2000) – actress, Rushmore, Old School, Imaginary Heroes
- Astra Taylor (Class of 2001) – activist and filmmaker, Zizek!, Examined Life, What Is Democracy?
- Christine Vachon (A.B. 1983) – acclaimed independent film producer, I'm Not There, Infamous (2006), The Notorious Bettie Page, Far From Heaven, Hedwig and the Angry Inch, Boys Don't Cry (1999); executive producer, This American Life
- Andrew Wagner (A.B. 1985) – writer, director, Starting Out in the Evening, The Talent Given Us
- Earl Wallace (A.B. 1955) – Academy Award-winning screenwriter, Witness
- Julie Warner (A.B. 1987) – actress, Doc Hollywood, Tommy Boy
- Emma Watson (A.B. 2014) – actress, model, and activist, Harry Potter, The Perks of Being a Wallflower, Beauty and the Beast (2017), Little Women (2019)
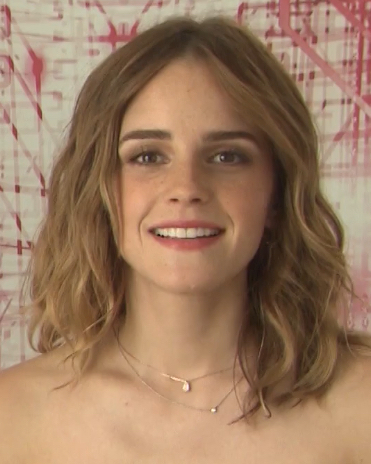
  Emma Watson (2014)
- Betsy West (1973) – filmmaker and director, RBG, My Name Is Pauli Murray; Fred W. Friendly Professor of Professional Practice in Media Society Emeritus, Columbia University Graduate School of Journalism
- JoBeth Williams (A.B. 1970) – actress, The Big Chill, Poltergeist
- Elizabeth Woodward – producer, The Great Hack, The Vow, You Resemble Me
- Janet Yang (A.B. 1978) – first Asian-American president, Academy of Motion Picture Arts and Sciences (2022–); producer, The Joy Luck Club, The People vs. Larry Flynt, South Central
- Jeff Zimbalist (2000) – filmmaker, Favela Rising

=== Television ===
- Sosie Bacon (Class of 2014) – actress, 13 Reasons Why, Loverboy, Smile; daughter of Kevin Bacon and Kyra Sedgwick
- Iris Bahr (1998) – actress, Larry the Cable Guy: Health Inspector, Curb Your Enthusiasm
- Kenneth Biller (1986) – television producer, writer, and director
- Julie Bowen (A.B. 1991) – actress, Modern Family, Boston Legal, Ed, Happy Gilmore

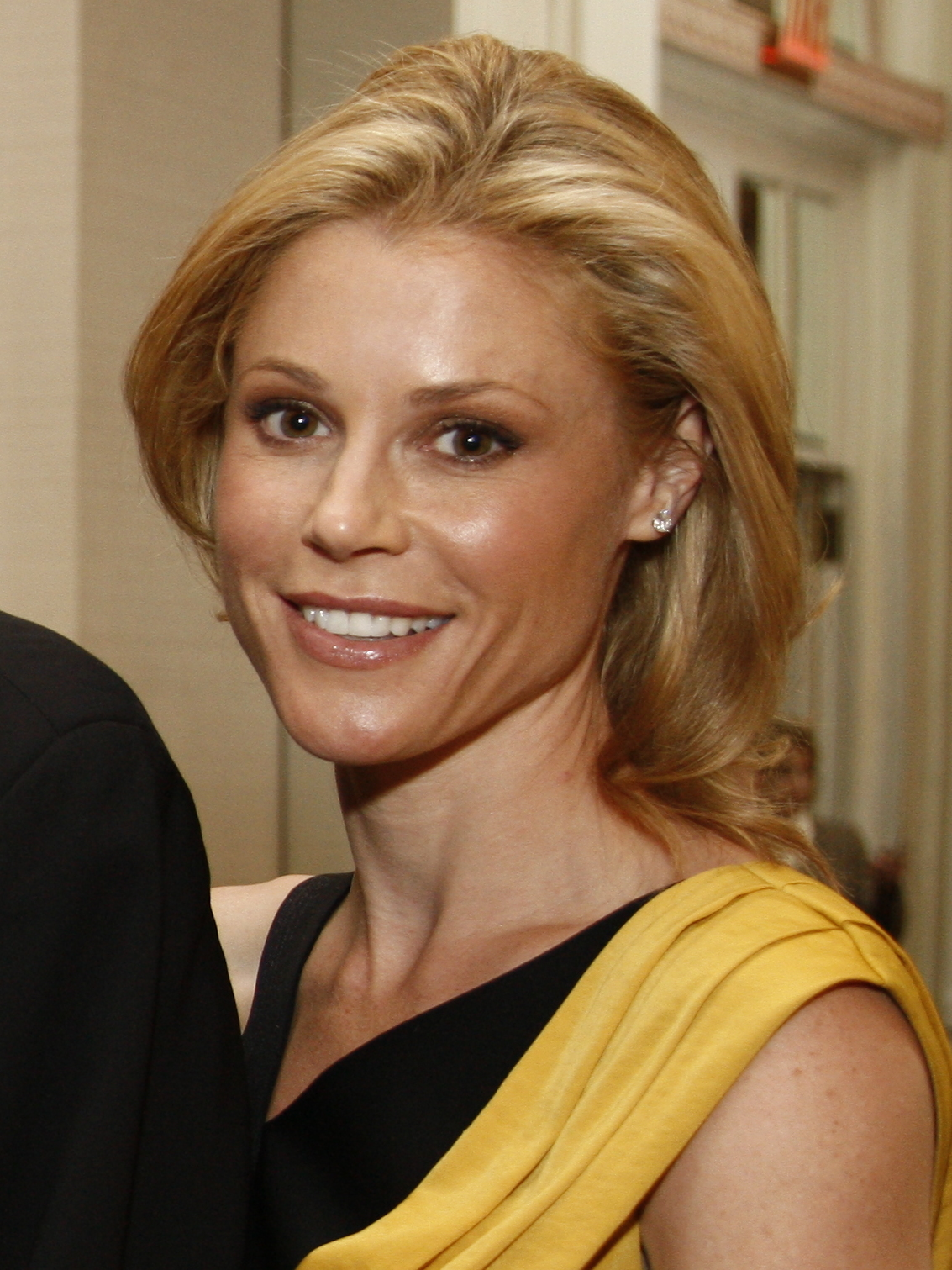
Julie Bowen (1991)

- Roger Bowen (A.B.) – comedic actor, M*A*S*H; novelist
- Warren Brown – host, Sugar Rush
- Jessica Capshaw (A.B. 1998) – actress, Grey's Anatomy, The Practice, Minority Report
- Jordan Carlos (A.B. 2001) – comedian, Stephen Colbert's "black friend"
- Charise Castro Smith (A.B. 2005) – actress, writer, playwright, producer, The Exorcist, The Haunting of Hill House, Encanto
- Kitty Chen (A.B. 1966) – actress, Law & Order, writer
- Nick Chinlund – actor, The X-Files
- Jude Ciccolella (A.B. 1969) – actor, best known for his role as Mike Novick in 24
- Julian Cihi (A.B. 2009) – Japanese and American actor
- Joel de la Fuente (A.B. 1991) – actor, best known for his role as Dr. Johann Pryce in Hemlock Grove
- Aunjanue Ellis (A.B. 1993) – actress, The Mentalist, Academy Award nominee for King Richard

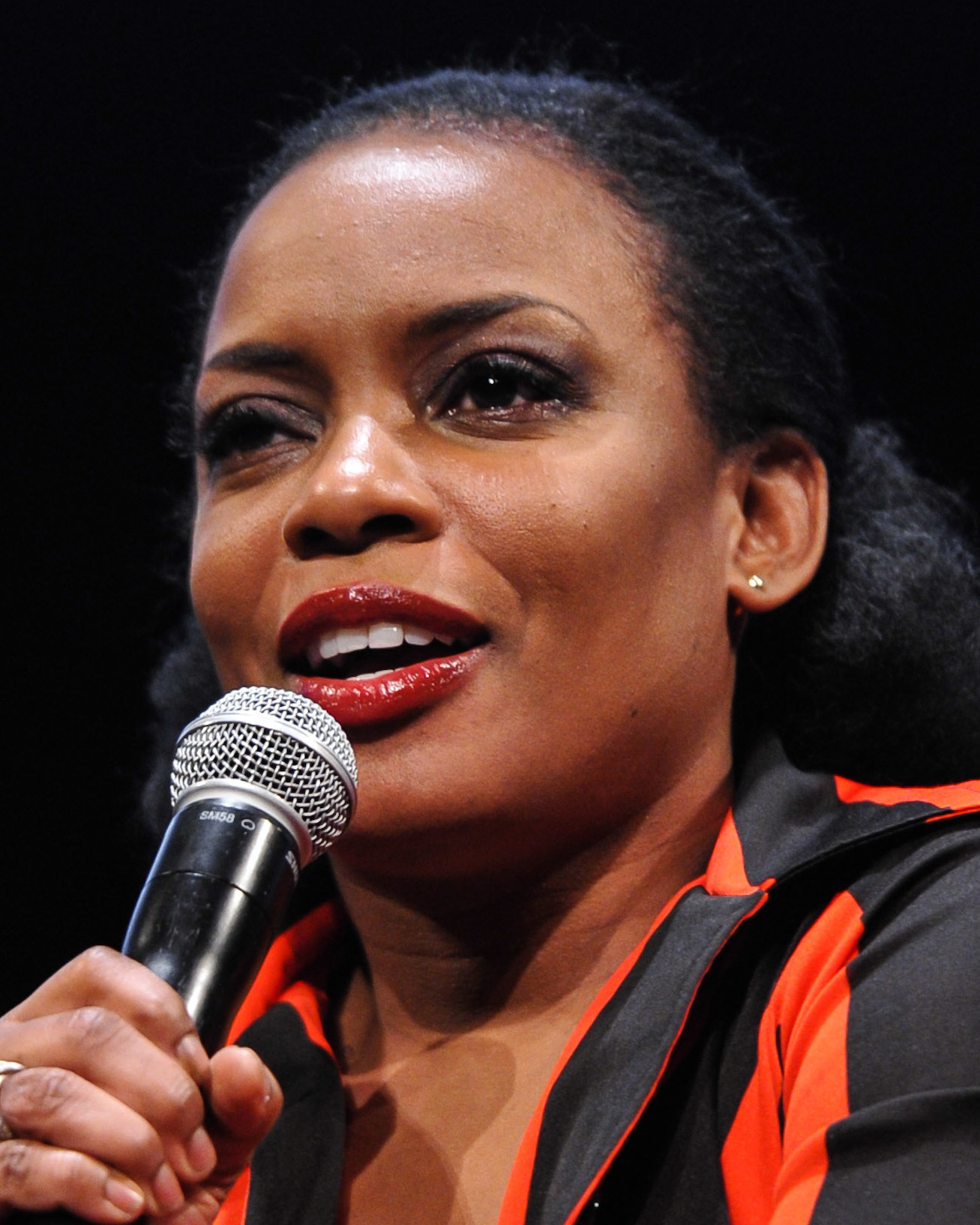
Aunjanue Ellis (1993)

- India Ennenga (A.B.) – actress, Treme, The Returned
- Eve Gordon (A.B. 1978) – actress, Recount, Honey, We Shrunk Ourselves, Felicity, American Horror Story, Don't Trust the B— in Apartment 23, Supernatural
- Robin Green (1967) – Emmy Award-winning writer and producer, The Sopranos, Northern Exposure
- Andy Greenwald (1999) – writer, podcaster, and producer
- Jonathan Groff (A.B. 1983) – actor, BlackAF; producer, Black-ish; writer, The Jon Stewart Show and Late Night with Conan O'Brien
- David Groh (1961) – actor, Rhoda
- Levon Hawke – actor, son of Ethan Hawke and Uma Thurman
- Marin Hinkle (1988) – actress, The Marvelous Mrs. Maisel, Once and Again, Two and a Half Men
- Takehiro Hira (1997) – Japanese-born actor, Giri/Haji, Sekigahara
- Tina Holmes (1995) – actress, Six Feet Under
- Peter Jacobson (1987) – actor, House M.D.
- Max Joseph (2004) – host, Catfish: The TV Show
- Rafe Judkins (2005) – contestant on Survivor: Guatemala, television writer
- Rhonda Ross Kendrick (A.B. 1993) – Daytime Emmy-nominated actress, Another World, daughter of Diana Ross
- Rory Kennedy (A.B. 1990) – Emmy Award-winning documentary producer, director, and writer, American Hollow, Ghosts of Abu Ghraib

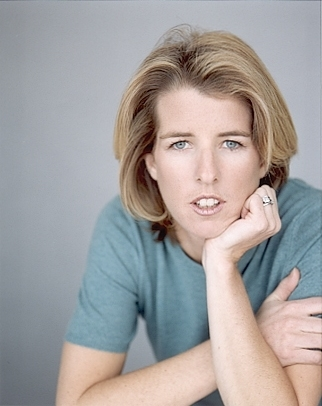
Rory Kennedy (1990)

- John Krasinski (A.B. 2002) – actor, The Office, Leatherheads, License to Wed; director, A Quiet Place
- Nicole Leach (A.B. 2000) – actress
- Clea Lewis (A.B. 1987) – actress, Ellen, Andy Barker, P.I.
- Tom Lipinski (A.B. 2004) – actor, Suits
- Florencia Lozano (A.B. 1992) – actress, One Life to Live
- Ian Maxtone-Graham (A.B. 1982.5) – writer, producer, The Simpsons, Saturday Night Live
- Silas Weir Mitchell (A.B. 1991) – actor, Grimm
- Alexandra Metz (A.B. 2008) – actress, The Pitt
- Peter Nowalk (A.B. 2000) – creator, How to Get Away with Murder; producer, Scandal, Grey's Anatomy
- Masi Oka (Sc.B. 1997) – actor, Heroes, Scrubs, Will and Grace, Gilmore Girls, Get Smart

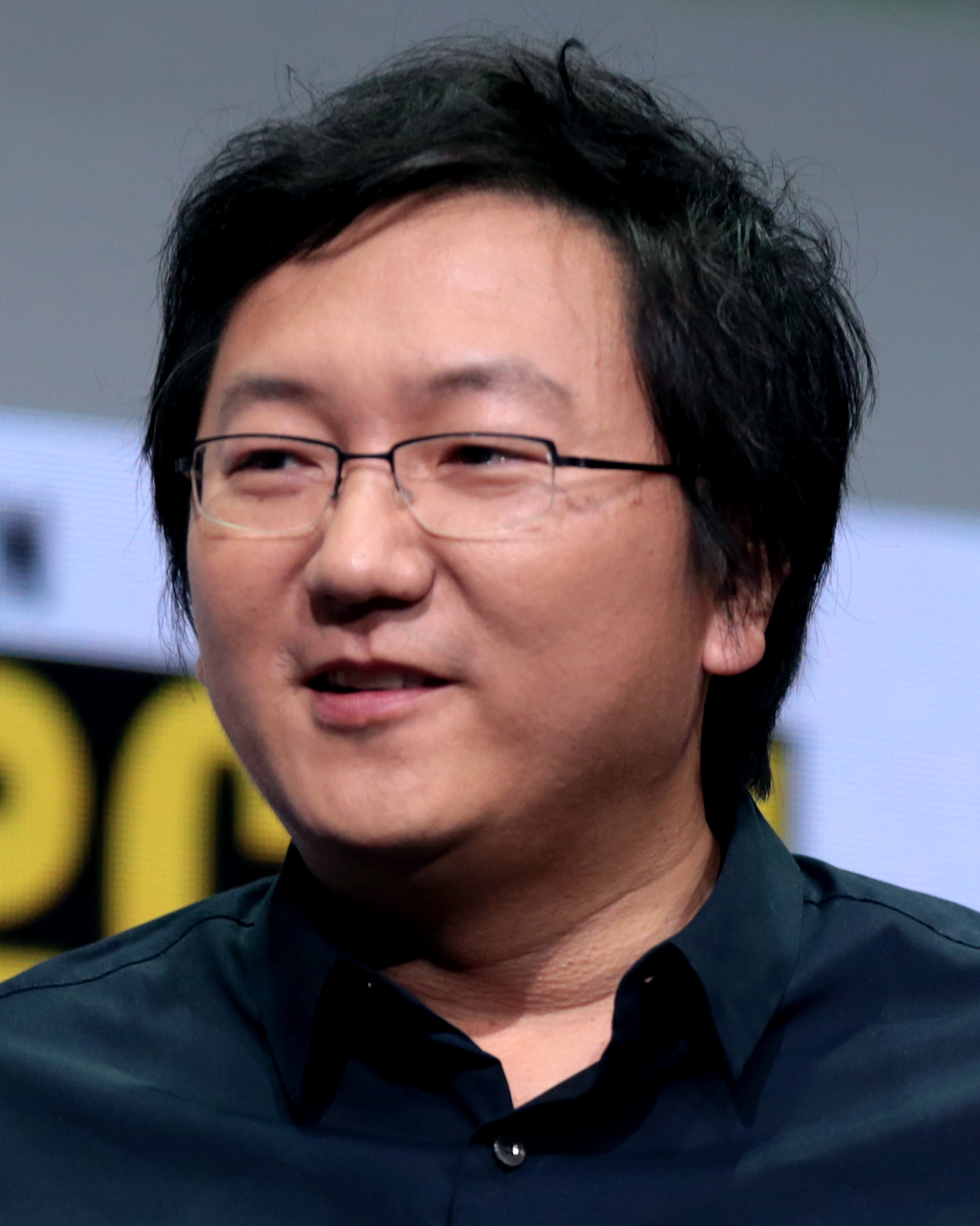
Masi Oka (1997)

- Monica Owusu-Breen (1990) – writer, Alias, Lost; executive producer, Brothers & Sisters, Midnight, Texas
- John Pleshette (1964) – actor, Knots Landing, The Trial of Lee Harvey Oswald
- Tracee Ellis Ross (A.B. 1995) – actress, Girlfriends, Black-ish, daughter of Diana Ross

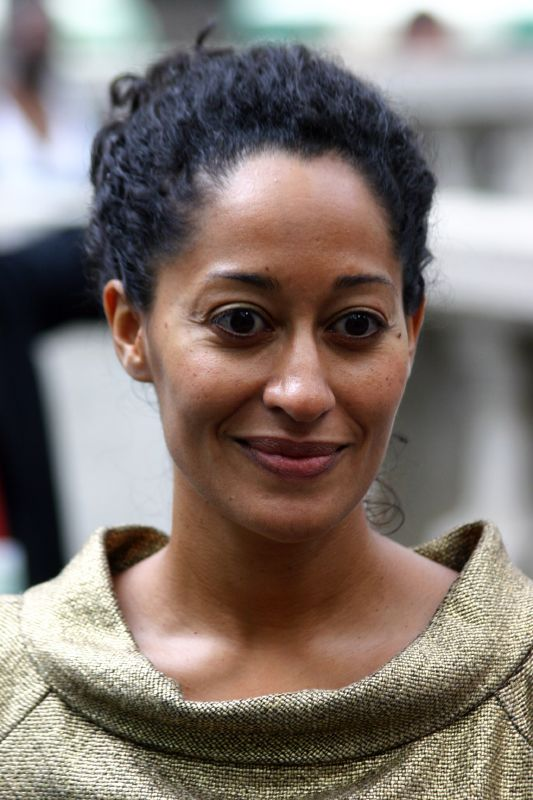
Tracee Ellis Ross (1995)

- Ben Shenkman (A.B. 1990) – actor, Royal Pains and Angels in America
- Sam Trammell (A.B. 1991) – actor, True Blood
- Bee Vang (2015) – actor, Gran Torino, writer
- Julie Warner (A.B. 1987) – actress, Nip/Tuck, Family Law, The Guiding Light
- Suzanne Whang (Sc. M. 1986) – General Hospital, Las Vegas; host HGTV's House Hunters
- David Walton (2001) – actor, About a Boy
- Moisés Zamora (A.B. 2000) – creator, Selena: The Series

=== Theater ===
- Ayad Akhtar (A.B. 1993) – Pulitzer Prize–winning playwright, Disgraced
- John Lee Beatty (A.B. 1970) – Tony Award-winning set designer
- Adam Bock (M.F.A. 1989) – Obie Award-winning playwright, The Thugs
- Kate Burton (A.B. 1979) – actress; nominated for three Tony Awards; on Grey's Anatomy as Dr. Ellis Grey
- Zoë Chao (A.B. 2008) – actress in theatre and star of her own television show The God Particles; currently starring as Isobel in Facebook Watch drama Strangers
- Nilo Cruz (M.F.A. 1994) – Pulitzer Prize–winning playwright, Anna in the Tropics

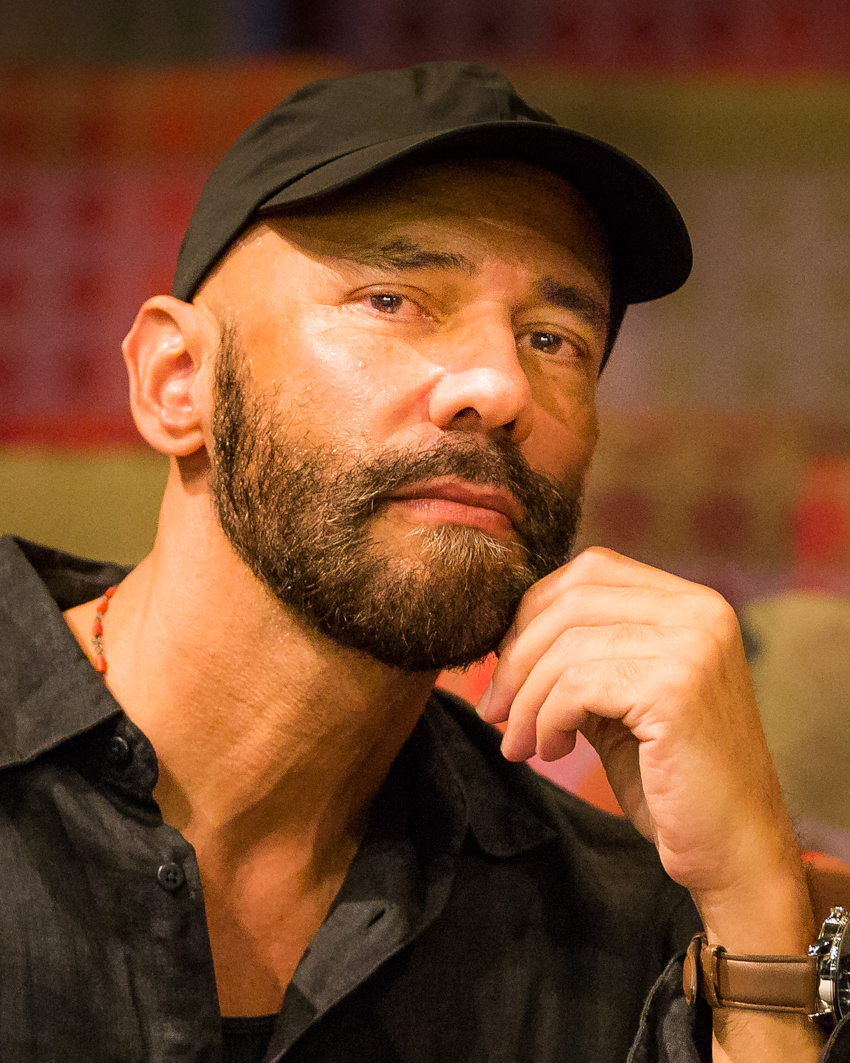
Nilo Cruz (1994)

- Daveed Diggs (A.B. 2004) – actor, Tony Award-winning originator of the roles of Thomas Jefferson and Marquis de Lafayette in the Pulitzer-Prize-winning 2015 musical Hamilton

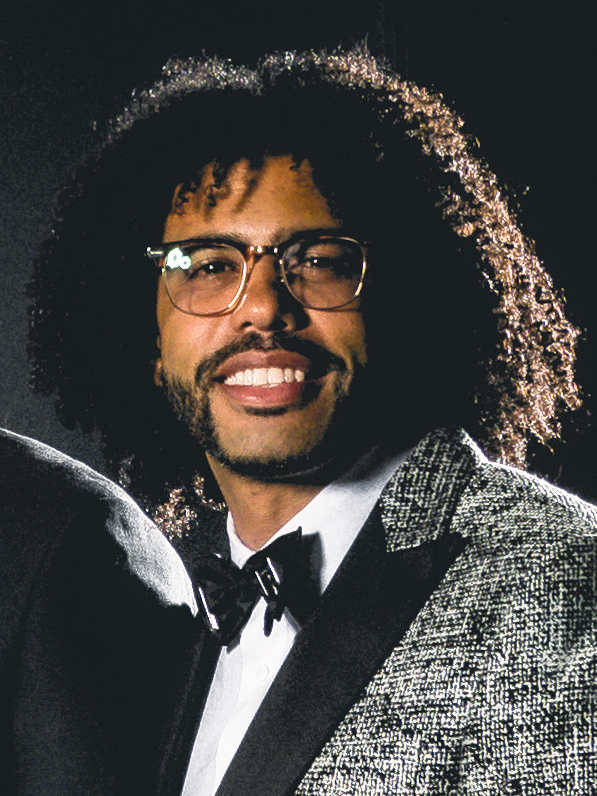
Daveed Diggs (2004)

- Jackie Sibblies Drury (M.F.A.) – Pulitzer Prize–winning playwright, Fairview
- Katherine G. Farley (A.B. 1971) – chair, Lincoln Center
- Gina Gionfriddo (M.F.A. 1997) – playwright, two-time Pulitzer Prize finalist, Becky Shaw (2009) and Rapture, Blister, Burn (2013); producer, Law and Order
- Ann Harada (A.B. 1985) – actress in the original Broadway casts of Avenue Q and Cinderella
- Quiara Alegría Hudes (M.F.A. 2004) – Pulitzer Prize–winning playwright, Water by the Spoonful, In the Heights (Tony Award winner for Best Musical), Elliot, a Soldier's Fugue
- Stephen Karam (A.B. 2002) – playwright, Speech & Debate (2006); Tony Award winner, The Humans (2016); two-time Pulitzer Prize finalist, Sons of the Prophet (2012) and The Humans
- Danny Mefford (M.F.A. 2007) – choreographer, Dear Evan Hansen, Fun Home, Kimberly Akimbo
- Honor Molloy (M.F.A. 1993) – award–winning playwright, Crackskull Row, Smarty Girl: Dublin Savage
- Rachel Moore (A.B. 1992) – CEO, Performing Arts Center of Los Angeles County (The Music Center); CEO, American Ballet Theatre
- James Naughton (A.B. 1967) – actor, two-time Tony Award winner for City of Angels (1992) and Chicago (1996); also featured in films such as The Paper Chase (1973), The Glass Menagerie (1987) and The Devil Wears Prada (2006)
- John Ford Noonan (A.B. 1964) – actor and playwright best known for A Coupla White Chicks Sitting Around Talking
- Lynn Nottage (A.B. 1986) – first female playwright to win the Pulitzer Prize twice, Macarthur fellowship recipient, Ruined, Sweat
- Sarah Ruhl (A.B. 1997, M.F.A 2001) – playwright and two-time Pulitzer Prize finalist, recipient of the Macarthur fellowship, The Clean House, Eurydice, |Passion Play, In the Next Room (or The Vibrator Play)
- Burt Shevelove (1937) – Tony Award-winning playwright, A Funny Thing Happened on the Way to the Forum
- Miriam Silverman (A.B. 2001, M.F.A. 2005) – Tony Award-winning actress, The Sign in Sidney Brustein's Window, The Marvelous Mrs. Maisel

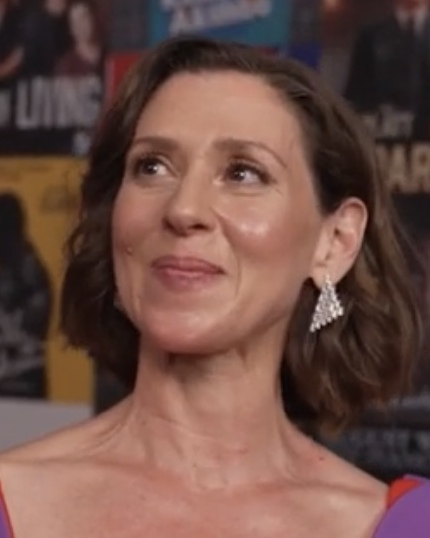
Miriam Silverman (2001, 2005)

- Alfred Uhry (1958) – playwright; Pulitzer Prize, Academy Award and Tony Award winner, Driving Miss Daisy, The Last Night of Ballyhoo
- Amy Van Nostrand – actress, The Hothouse
- David Yazbek (1982) – Tony and Emmy Award-winning writer, musician, composer, and lyricist, The Band's Visit (2017), The Full Monty (2000), Dirty Rotten Scoundrels (2005) and Women on the Verge of a Nervous Breakdown (2010)
- John Lloyd Young (A.B. 1998) – actor; Tony Award winner for Jersey Boys (2006); lead vocalist, 2007 Grammy-winning Jersey Boys album for Clint Eastwood's 2014 Jersey Boys; member of President's Committee on the Arts and Humanities

== Religion and theology ==
- Alfred W. Anthony (A.B. 1883) – professor at Bates College and Cobb Divinity School, author, Free Will Baptist minister
- Mark E. Brennan (A.B. 1969) – Catholic auxiliary bishop of Baltimore
- Alexander Burgess (1838) – 1st bishop of the Episcopal Diocese of Quincy
- Frederick Burgess (1873) – bishop of the Episcopal Diocese of Long Island
- George Burgess (1826) – first bishop of the Episcopal Diocese of Maine
- S. Kent Brown (Ph.D. 1972) – Professor Emeritus of Ancient Scripture, Brigham Young University
- Elizabeth Castelli (A.B. 1979) – Professor of Religion, Barnard College
- Thornton Chase (Class of 1870) – first western convert to the Baháʼí Faith
- Edward Winter Clark (1857) – Baptist missionary active in Nagaland, India
- Paula Clark (A.B. 1984) – 13th bishop of the Episcopal Diocese of Chicago
- L. F. P. Curry – presiding bishop and member of the First Presidency, Community of Christ
- James Cooley Fletcher (1846) – Presbyterian missionary active in Brazil
- Josiah Goddard (1835) – Baptist missionary active in China
- Adoniram Judson Gordon (1860) – Baptist preacher; founder of Gordon College and Gordon–Conwell Theological Seminary
- Ronald Michael Green (A.B. 1964) – Eunice and Julian Cohen Professor for the Study of Ethics and Human Values in Religion, Dartmouth College
- Alexander Viets Griswold (A.B. 1810) – 5th presiding bishop of the Episcopal Church; Episcopal bishop of the Eastern Diocese, which included all of New England with the exception of the Episcopal Diocese of Connecticut
- Stephen P. Hill (1829) – chaplain of the United States Senate
- Mark Antony DeWolfe Howe (A.B. 1828) – first bishop of the Episcopal Diocese of Central Pennsylvania (now Diocese of Bethlehem)
- James Huckins – first Southern Baptist missionary of Texas
- Jayapataka Swami – religious leader for the International Society for Krishna Consciousness
- Lyman Jewett (1848) – Baptist missionary active in India
- William Bullein Johnson (A.M. 1814) – South Carolina Baptist leader; first president of the Southern Baptist Convention; instrumental figure in the founding of Furman University, out of which emerged Southern Baptist Theological Seminary
- Adoniram Judson (A.B. 1807) – Baptist missionary; due in part to his efforts, Myanmar has the third largest number of Baptists worldwide

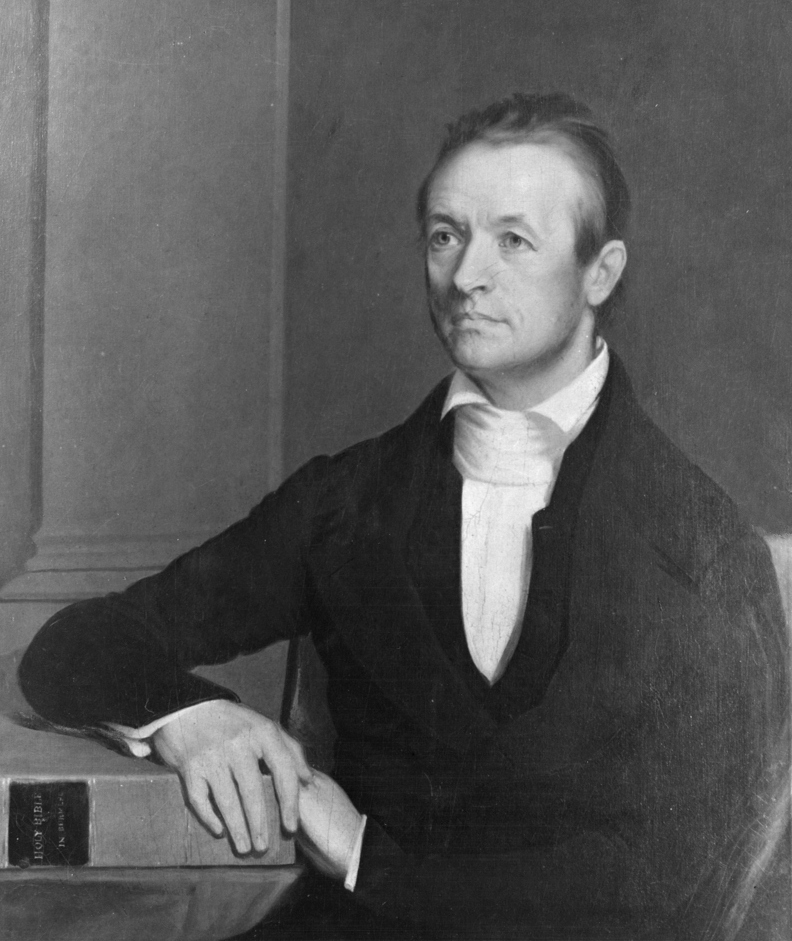
Adoniram Judson (1807)

- Matthew Kapstein (Ph.D. 1987) – Numata Visiting Professor of Buddhist Studies, University of Chicago Divinity School
- Cyrus Kingsbury (1812) – Christian missionary active among several Native American communities
- Swami Kriyananda (1945–47) – founder of the Ananda movement
- Yehuda Kurtzer (A.M. 2001) – president of the Shalom Hartman Institute of North America
- Edward Lewis Lee Jr. (A.B. 1956) – 7th bishop of the Episcopal Diocese of Western Michigan
- Ronald H. Nash (A.M. 1960) – Evangelical Baptist philosopher and apologist; professor, Reformed Theological Seminary
- Gail R. O'Day (A.B. 1976) – dean and professor of New Testament and Preaching, Wake Forest University School of Divinity
- Edwards Amasa Park (1826) – Abbot Professor of Christian theology, Andover Theological Seminary
- William Stevens Perry (Class of 1854) – 2nd bishop of the Episcopal Diocese of Iowa
- Henry Niles Pierce (1842) – bishop of the Episcopal Diocese of Arkansas
- George Maxwell Randall (A.B. 1835) – bishop of the Episcopal Diocese of Colorado and Parts Adjacent
- Hays Hamilton Rockwell (A.B. 1958) – 9th bishop of the Episcopal Diocese of Missouri
- Robert A. Seiple (1965) – president, Eastern University; president, Palmer Theological Seminary; 1st United States Ambassador-at-Large for International Religious Freedom
- Benjamin B. Smith (1816) – 9th Presiding Bishop of the Episcopal Church
- Katherine Sonderegger (Ph.D. 1990) – William Meade Chair in Systematic Theology, Virginia Theological Seminary
- Jeffrey Stout (A.B. 1972) – professor emeritus of Religion, Princeton University
- Gray Temple (A.B. 1935) – 11th bishop of the Episcopal Diocese of South Carolina
- Joshua Toulmin (A.M. 1769) – English dissenting minister with U.S. sympathies
- Thomas Joseph White (A.B. 1993) – rector, Pontifical University of Saint Thomas Aquinas
- George Frederick Wright (D.D. 1887) – professor of the Harmony of Science and Revelation, Oberlin Theological Seminary
- Wubong (A.B. 1973) – Zen master and head teacher of the European Kwan Um School of Zen

== Royalty and nobility ==
- Aga Khan V (A.B. 1995) – 50th imam of Nizari Ismailism, eldest son of Prince Karim Aga Khan IV
- Prince Alexander-Georg von Auersperg (1983) – son of Sunny von Bülow
- Countess Cosima von Bülow Pavoncelli (1989) – daughter of Claus von Bülow and Sunny von Bülow
- Prince Jaime Bernardo of Bourbon-Parma, Count of Bardi – member of the House of Bourbon-Parma and relative of the Dutch royal family; Dutch Ambassador to the Holy See
- Prince Alexander von Fürstenberg (A.B. 1993) – businessman, son of Diane von Fürstenberg and Prince Egon von Fürstenberg
- Princess Tatiana von Fürstenberg (A.B. 1991) –singer-songwriter, daughter of Diane von Fürstenberg and Prince Egon von Fürstenberg
- Prince Faisal bin Al Hussein (Sc.B. 1985) – son of the late King Hussein of Jordan; Commander of the Jordan Royal Air Force
- Prince Nikolaos of Greece and Denmark (A.B. 1993) – member of the titular royal family of Greece
- Princess Nissa Raad (A.B. 2002) – member of the Jordanian royal family
- Princess Lila Pahlavi (A.B. 1992) – Princess of Iran; youngest daughter of Mohammad Reza Pahlavi, deposed Shah of Iran
- Princess Theodora of Greece and Denmark (A.B. 2006) – member of the titular royal family of Greece
- Prince Nikita Romanov – member of the Romanov family
- Lady Gabriella Windsor (A.B. 2004) – member of the British royal family

== Fine and applied arts ==
=== Architecture ===
- Stan Allen (A.B. 1978) – architect; George Dutton '27 Professor of Architecture and former Dean (2002–2012), Princeton University School of Architecture
- Edwin T. Banning (1885) – architect active in Rhode Island
- Prescott O. Clarke (1880) – architect active in Rhode Island
- Henry Atherton Frost – architect
- Sarah Williams Goldhagen (A.B. 1982) – architectural critic
- John G. Haskell – architect of Kansas public buildings, including the Kansas State Capitol
- Raymond Hood (1898–99) – architect of the Tribune Tower in Chicago and Rockefeller Center in New York

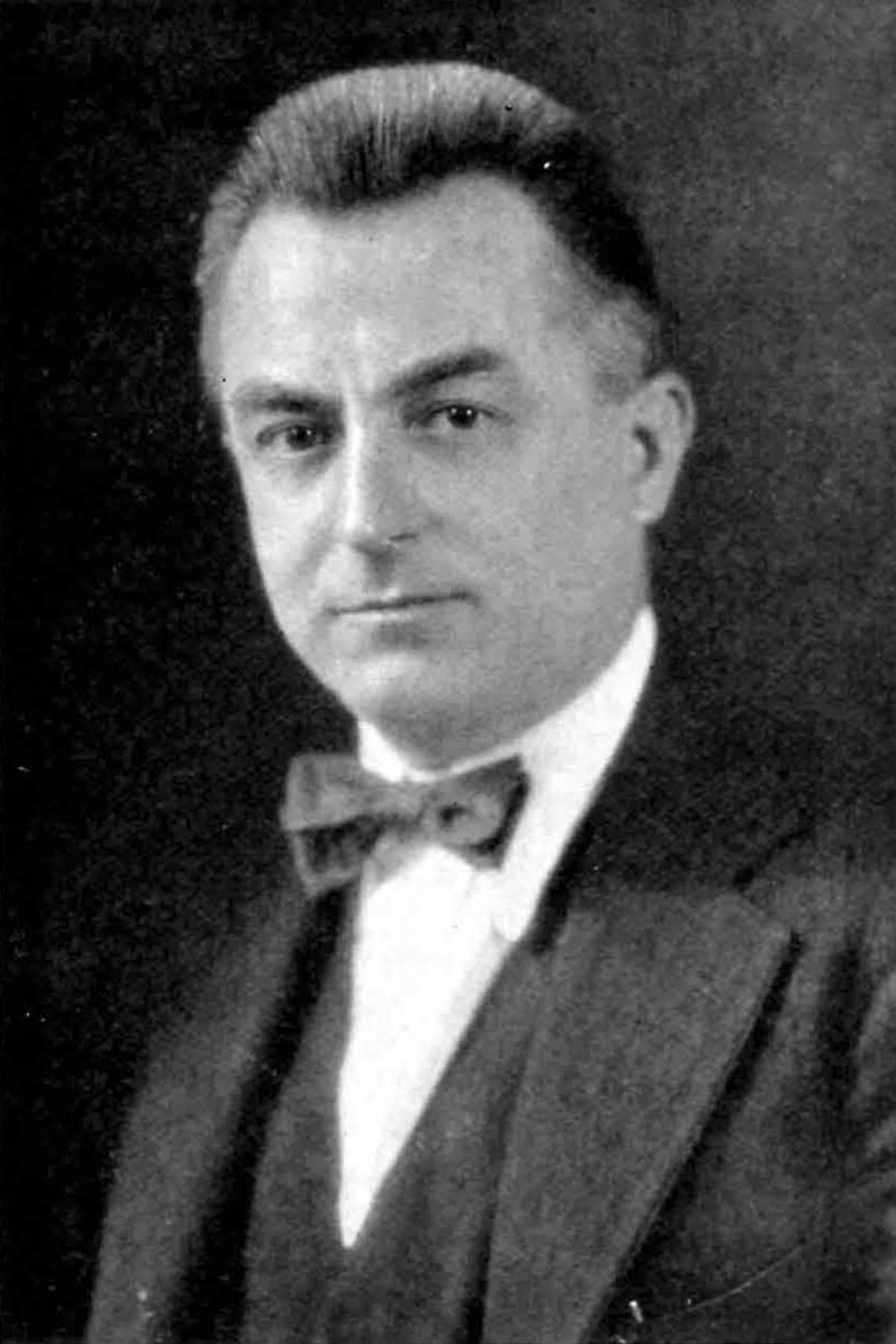
Raymond Hood (1902)

- Charles Evans Hughes III (A.B.) – architect, grandson of Charles Evans Hughes
- Francis L. V. Hoppin (A.B.) – architect
- Norman Isham (A.B. 1886, A.M. 1890) – Rhode Island historical architect
- Harry Wild Jones – architect
- John Black Lee – mid-century modern architect
- Robert Somol (A.B. 1982) – architectural theorist
- Laurinda Hope Spear (B.F.A. 1972) – architect, co-founder of Arquitectonica
- Thomas Alexander Tefft (1851) – pioneer American architect

=== Design ===
- Jonathan Adler (A.B. 1988) – potter, designer and author
- Nikolas Bentel (A.B. 2017) – designer
- Julie Carlson (A.B. 1983) – co-founder of Remodelista
- Tom Geismar (A.B. 1953) – graphic designer, designer of the PBS and Mobil logos
- Chuck Hoberman (1974–1976) – designer, inventor of the Hoberman sphere

=== Fashion ===
- Montana Levi Blanco (A.M.) – costume designer, recipient of the 2022 Tony Award for Best Costume Design in a Play
- Dana Buchman (A.B. 1973) – fashion designer
- Pierre-Alexis Dumas (A.B. 1991) – artistic director, Hermès (2011–present)
- Juman Malouf (1997) – Lebanese costume designer, partner of Wes Anderson
- Kimberly Ovitz (A.B. 2005) – fashion designer
- Michael Rider (A.B. 2002) – creative director, Celine
- André Leon Talley (A.M. 1973) – Vogue magazine editor-at-large; first African-American male creative director of Vogue
- Allegra Versace (Class of 2008) – heiress to Gianni Versace's fortune and daughter of Donatella Versace

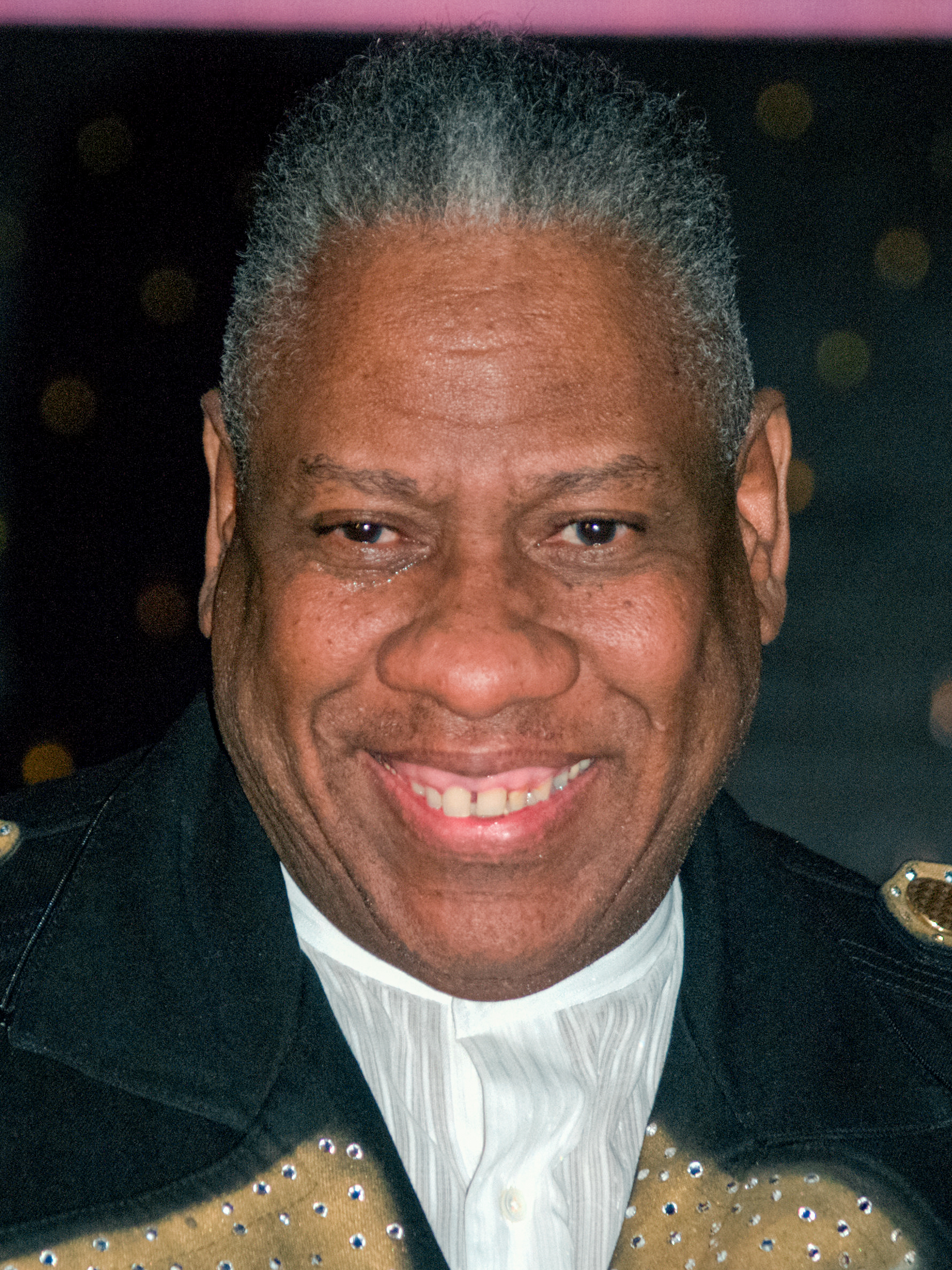
Andre Leon Talley (1973)

=== Visual arts ===
- David Aldrich (A.B. 1929) – watercolor painter
- Deborah Aschheim (A.B. 1986) – new media artist
- Marc Erwin Babej (A.B. 1992) – photographic artist, writer
- Éric Baudelaire (A.B. 1994) – artist
- Richard Benson (1961) – photographer, Dean of the Yale School of Art (1996–2006), recipient of the MacArthur Fellowship
- Bill Bollinger (1961) – minimalist sculptor and installation artist
- Susan Chen (A.B. 2015) – painter
- Dawn Clements (A.B. 1986) – contemporary artist known for her panoramas
- Dave Cole (A.B. 2000) – sculptor, visual artist
- John Connell (Class of 1962) – sculptor and painter
- Devon Dikeou (A.B. 1986) – artist and curator
- Barnaby Evans (1975) – creator of the environmental art installation WaterFire
- Ayana Evans (A.B. 1998) – performance artist
- Brian Floca (A.B. 1991) – author and book illustrator
- Coco Fusco (A.B. 1982) – interdisciplinary artist and feminist

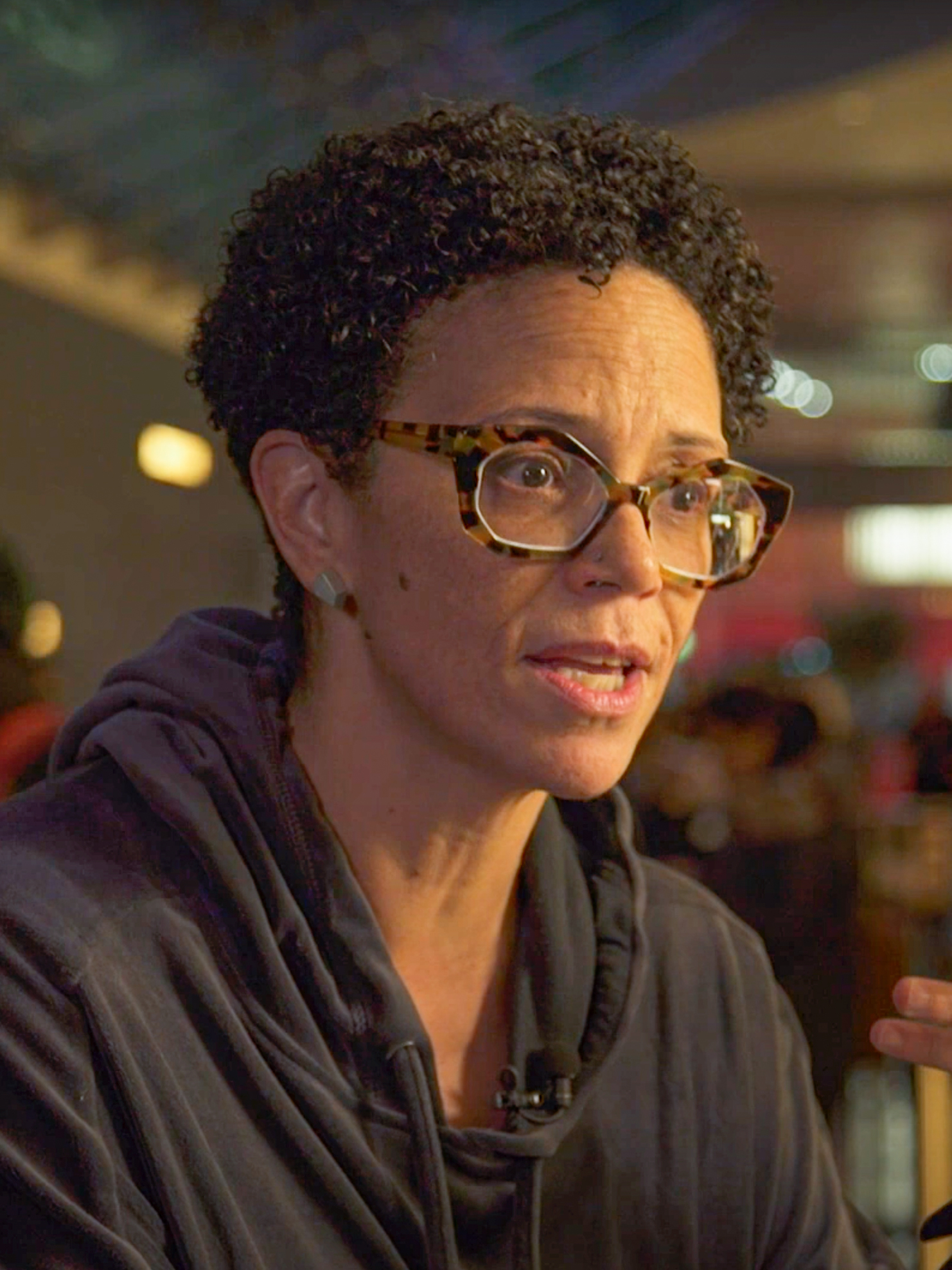
Coco Fusco (1982)

- Susan Freedman (A.B. 1982) – president of the Public Art Fund
- Chitra Ganesh (A.B. 1996) – artist
- Orly Genger (A.B. 2001) – contemporary sculptor and installation artist
- Sanford Robinson Gifford (A.B. 1844) – landscape painter of the Hudson River School
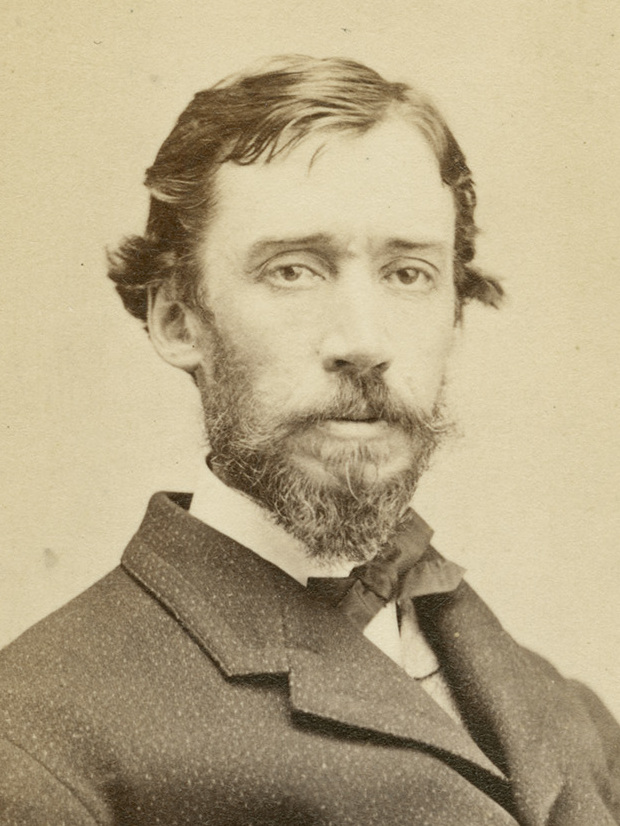
  Sanford Robinson Gifford (1844)
- Isca Greenfield-Sanders (A.B. 2000) – artist
- Karl Haendel (A.B. 1998) – artist known for his pencil drawings
- Ilana Halperin (A.B. 1995) – artist
- George Hitchcock (A.B. 1872) – impressionist painter
- Akiko Ichikawa (A.B. 1994) – interdisciplinary visual artist and writer
- Bill Jacobson (A.B. 1977) – photographer
- Ken Johnson (A.B. 1976) – art critic for the New York Times
- Paul Ramirez Jonas (A.B. 1987) – contemporary artist; chair of the Department of Art, Cornell University College of Architecture, Art, and Planning
- Nina Katchadourian (A.B. 1989) – multimedia artist
- Richard Kostelanetz (A.B. 1962) – book-art, audio, video, photography, film, holography
- Paul Laffoley (A.B. 1962) – artist and architect
- Walter Liedtke (A.M. 1969) – curator of European paintings Metropolitan Museum of Art
- Candice Lin (A.B 2001) – artist
- Cameron Martin (A.B. 1994) – F.H. Sellers Professor in Painting, School of the Art Institute of Chicago
- Sarah Morris (A.B. 1988) – contemporary painter and filmmaker
- Elizabeth Neel (A.B. 1997) – contemporary painter
- Lisa Oppenheim (A.B. 1998) – multimedia artist
- Sarah Oppenheimer (A.B. 1995) – sculptor and installation artist
- Maureen Paley (A.B. 1975) – established the first East End gallery in London, represents the work of important contemporary artists
- Bern Porter (Sc.M. 1933) – visual artist and scientist involved in the development of the cathode-ray tube and the Manhattan Project
- Seth Price (A.B. 1997) – post-conceptual artist
- Lauren Redniss (A.B. 1996) – artist and writer, recipient of Guggenheim Fellowship and Macarthur fellowship
- Ralph Rugoff (A.B. 1980) – director, Hayward Gallery; artistic director for the 58th Venice Biennale
- Willoughby Sharp (A.B. 1957) – pioneer in conceptual and performance art
- Jeff Shesol (A.B. 1991) – cartoonist, Thatch; scriptwriter for Bill Clinton
- Taryn Simon (A.B. 1997) – multidisciplinary artist
- Scott Snibbe (A.B. 1991, MSc 1994) – interactive media artist
- Anne Morgan Spalter (A.B. 1987) – digital mixed media artist and pioneering computer art academic; founder of Brown's and RISD's original digital fine arts courses
- Martha Tedeschi (A.B. 1980) – Elizabeth and John Moors Cabot Director of the Harvard Art Museums
- Kerry Tribe (A.B. 1997) – installation artist
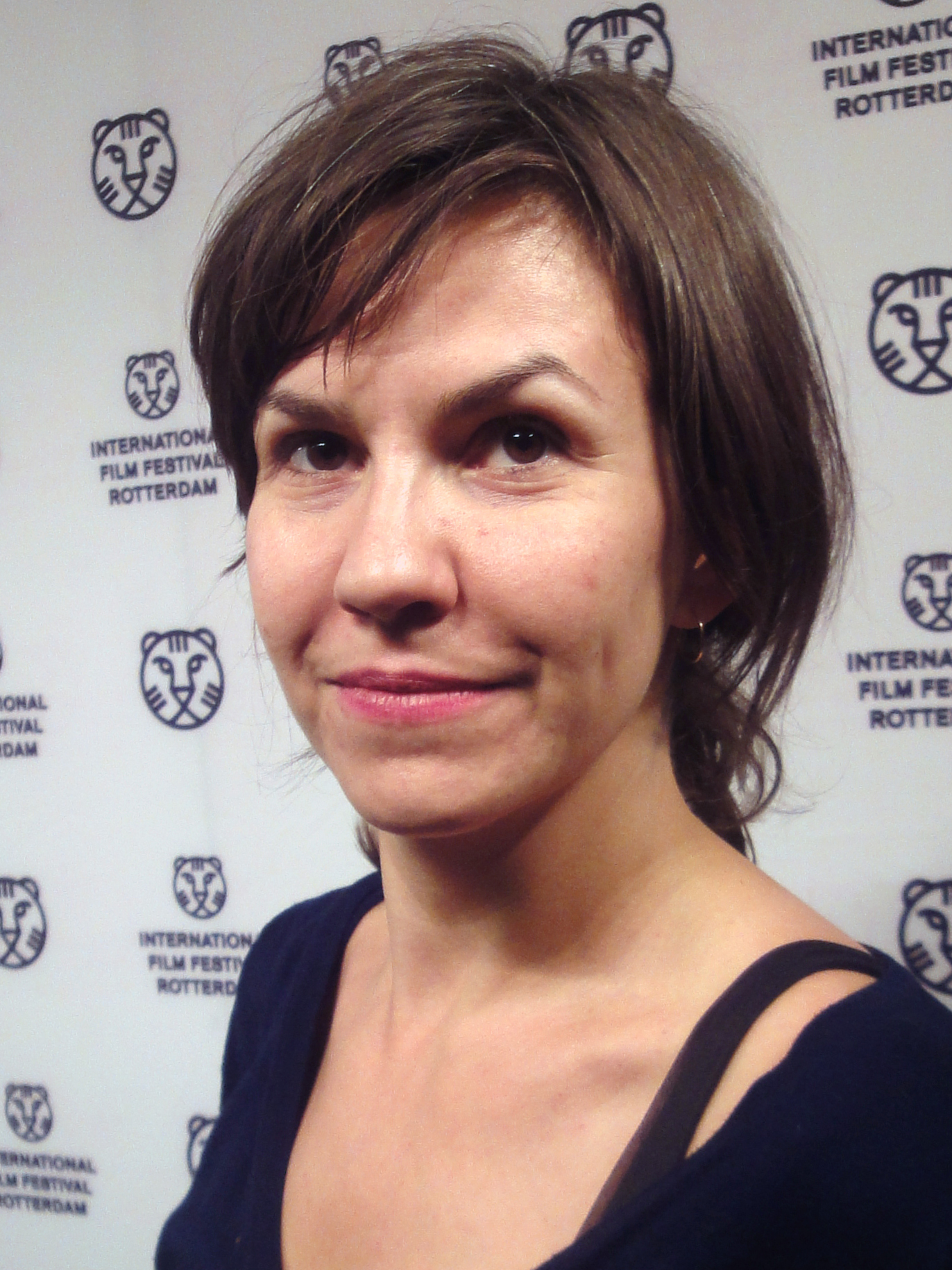
  Kerry Tribe (1997)
- Mark Tribe (A.B. 1990) – artist; chair of the School of Visual Arts' MFA program
- Ian Wardropper (A.B. 1973) – director, Frick Collection
- Marcus Waterman (1857) – Orientalist painter
- Nikolas Weinstein (born 1968), American glass artist
- Virgil Macey Williams (1847–1850) – painter, co-founder of the San Francisco Art Association
- Saya Woolfalk (A.B. 2001) – multimedia artist

=== Other ===
- Elizabeth Hargrave (1994) – board game designer

== Athletics ==
=== Baseball ===
- Bill Almon (1975) – professional baseball player for the San Diego Padres, New York Mets, Chicago White Sox, Oakland Athletics and Pittsburgh Pirates; No. 1 pick in the 1974 draft
- Mark Attanasio (A.B. 1979) – financier and owner of the Milwaukee Brewers
- Charley Bassett – professional baseball player
- Tommy Dowd – professional baseball player
- Dave Fultz – professional baseball player
- Irving "Bump" Hadley (Class of 1928) – professional baseball player, pitcher for the Washington Senators and New York Yankees
- Mike Lynch – professional baseball player
- Frank Philbrick – professional baseball player
- Lee Richmond – professional baseball player, pitched the first perfect game in major league baseball history
- Fred Tenney – professional baseball player
- William Edward White – possibly the first African-American to play major league baseball

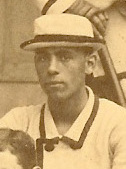
William Edward White

=== Basketball ===
- Lindsay Gottlieb (1999) – head coach, USC Trojans women's basketball
- DeAndre Jordan – 3-time All-NBA center for the New Orleans Pelicans
- Bernard Muir (1990) – athletic director at Stanford University
- Stephen Silas (1996) – head coach for the Houston Rockets

=== Football ===
- Don Colo (1950) – professional football player, three-time Pro Bowl selection; played for the Cleveland Browns
- Zak DeOssie (2007) – linebacker and long snapper for the New York Giants, two-time Pro Bowl selection (2008, 2010)
- James Develin (2010) – fullback for the New England Patriots; 2014 and 2016 Super Bowl Champion; 2017 Pro Bowl selection
- Mark Donovan (1988) – President of the Kansas City Chiefs
- John W. Heisman (Class of 1891) – college football player and coach; namesake of the Heisman Trophy

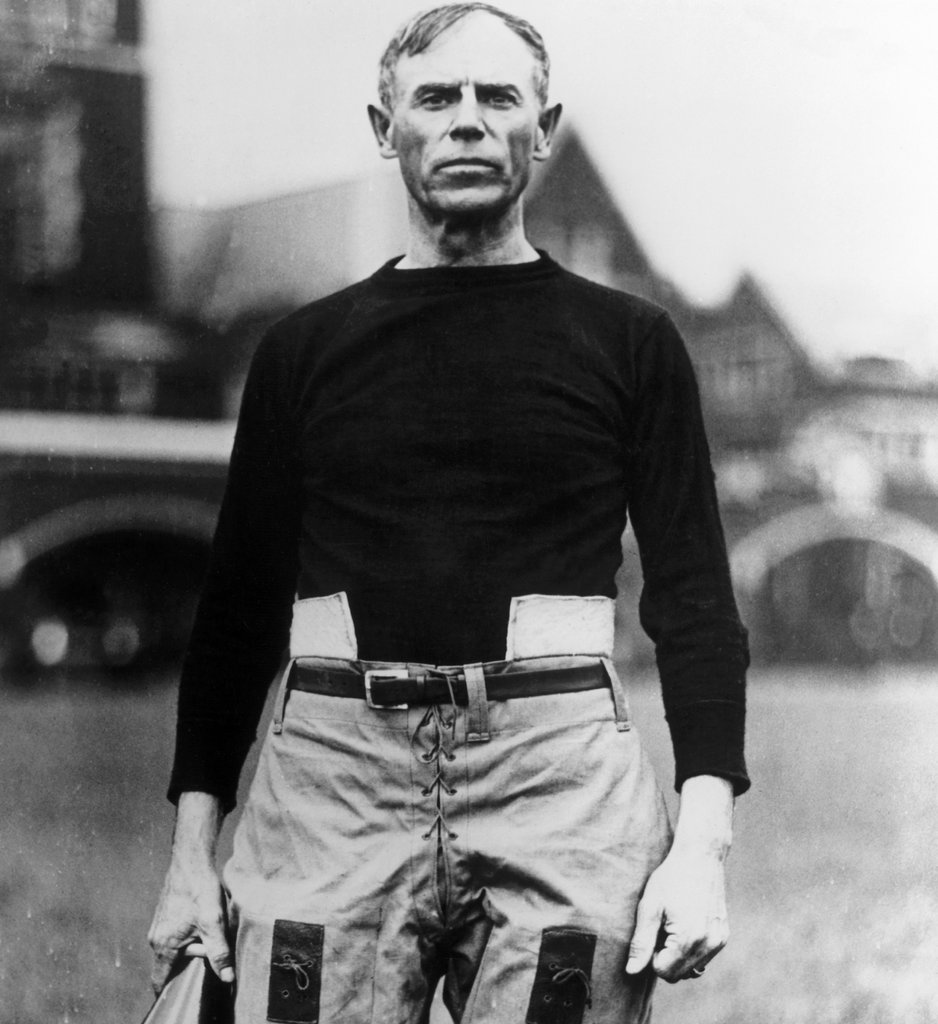
John Heisman (1891)

- Steve Jordan (Sc.B. 1982) – professional football player, six-time All-Pro tight end who played for the Minnesota Vikings
- Sean Morey (1999) – Special Teams Captain of 2005 Super Bowl XL Champion Pittsburgh Steelers
- Bill O'Brien (A.B. 1992) – Offensive coordinator and quarterbacks coach at the University of Alabama, former head Coach at Penn State, former NFL head coach of the Houston Texans
- Curly Oden (1921) – National Football League running back and member of 1928 league champion Providence Steam Roller
- Joe Paterno (A.B. 1950) – Head Coach for Penn State (1966–2011), all-time winningest Division I football coach
- E. J. Perry (A.B. 2021) – quarterback for the Michigan Panthers

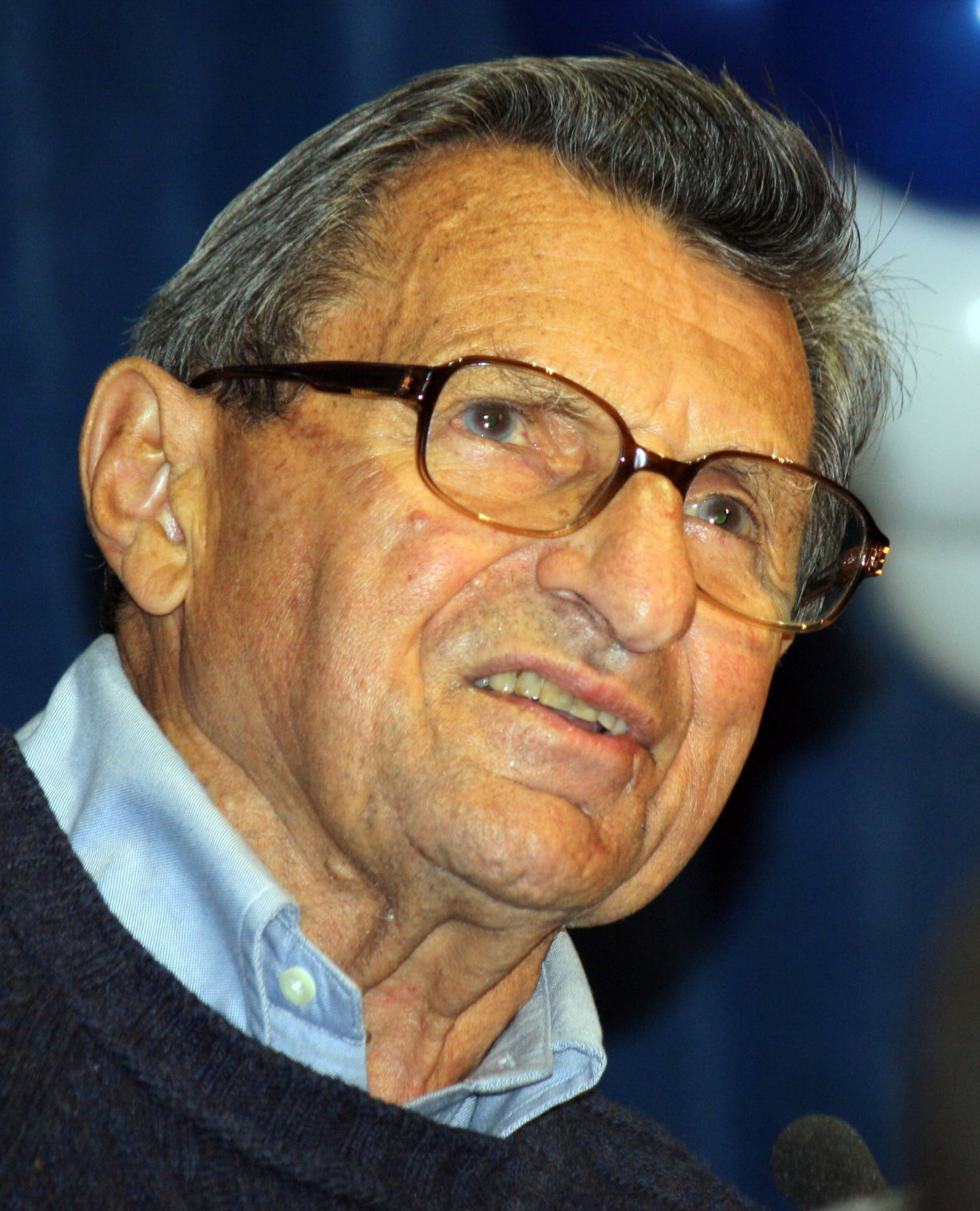
Joe Paterno (1950)

- Fritz Pollard (A.B. 1919) – first black All-American halfback; first black National Football League head coach; as a player, led the Akron Pros to the NFL's first-ever championship in 1920; inducted into the Pro Football Hall of Fame

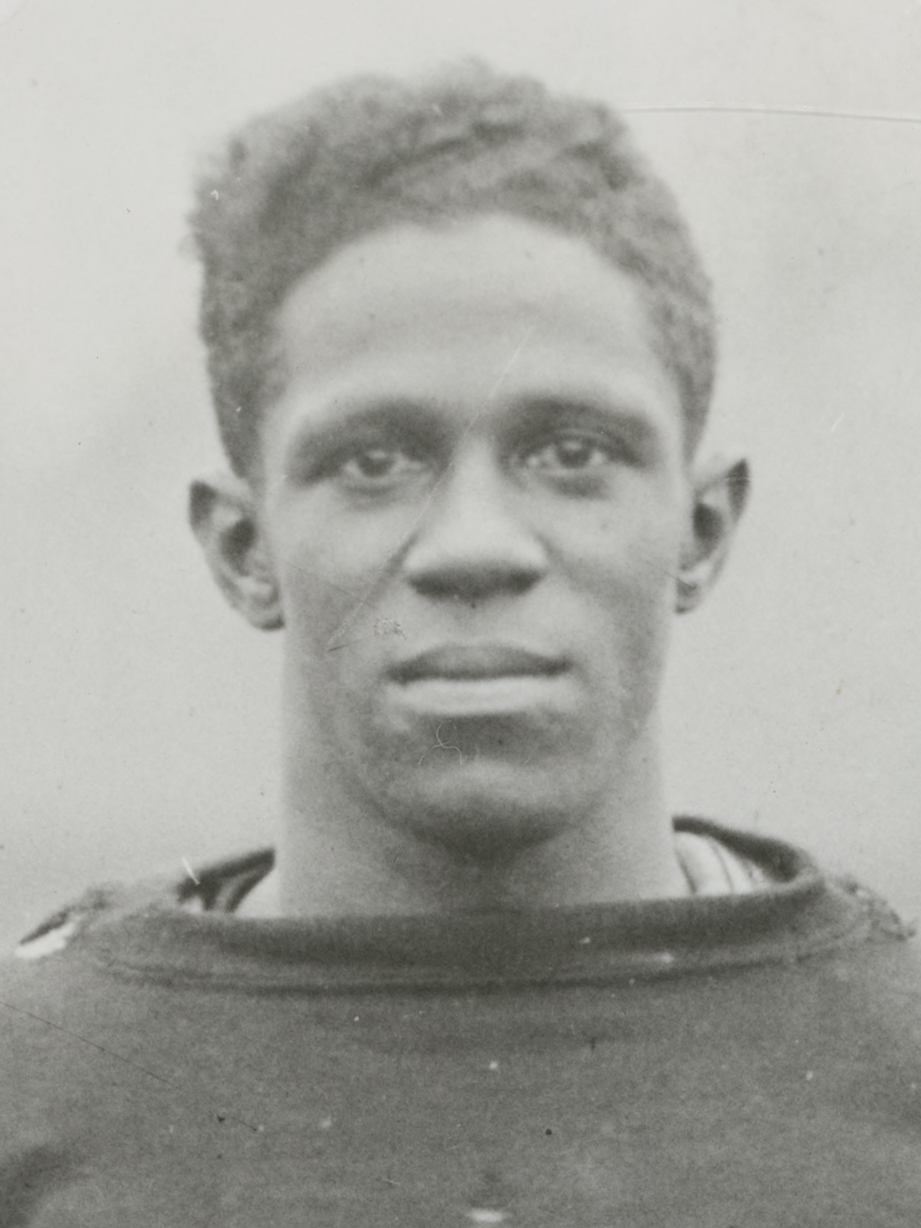
Fritz Pollard (1919)

- Edward North Robinson (1896) – football coach at University of Nebraska–Lincoln, Brown, Tufts, Boston University, and for the Providence Steam Roller; member of the College Football Hall of Fame
- Wallace Wade (1917) – football coach at the University of Alabama and then Duke, member of the College Football Hall of Fame; namesake of Duke's football stadium

=== Ice hockey ===
- Curt Bennett (1970) – professional ice hockey player, St. Louis Blues and Atlanta Flames
- Yann Danis (A.B. 2004) – professional ice hockey goaltender for the New York Islanders
- Brian Eklund (A.B. 2002) – professional ice hockey goaltender for the Tampa Bay Lightning
- Garnet Hathaway (2014) – professional ice hockey forward for the Washington Capitals
- Brian Ihnacak (1985) – professional ice hockey forward for HC '05 Banská Bystrica
- Sam Lafferty (2018) – professional ice hockey forward for the Vancouver Canucks

=== Lacrosse ===
- Timothy Kelly (2002) – general manager of the New York Titans of the National Lacrosse League
- Dylan Molloy (2017) – player for the Chrome Lacrosse Club
- Lars Tiffany (1990) – head coach of the Virginia Cavaliers men's lacrosse program at the University of Virginia
- Dom Starsia (1974) – former head coach of the Virginia Cavaliers men's lacrosse program at the University of Virginia

=== Olympics ===
==== Gold ====
- Tessa Gobbo (2013) – rower, Olympic gold (2016) medalist in women's coxed eight rowing
- Helen Johns Carroll (A.B. 1936) – freestyle swimmer, Olympic gold (1932) medalist
- Becky Kellar-Duke (1997) – Canadian ice hockey player, Olympic gold (2002, 2006, 2010) and silver (1998) medalist
- Katie King (1997) – ice hockey player, Olympic gold (1998), silver (2002), and bronze (2006) medalist
- Tara Mounsey (Sc.B. 2001) – ice hockey player, Olympic gold (1998) and silver (2002) medalist
- Xeno Müller (2002) – Swiss rower, Olympic gold (1996) and silver (2000) medalist in the single scull
- Albina Osipowich (A.B. 1933) – freestyle swimmer, Olympic gold (1928) medals in the 100-meter freestyle and 4×100-meter freestyle
- Alicia Sacramone (2010) – gymnast, Olympic silver (2008) medal in the women's artistic team all-around
- Jack Spellman (1924) – wrestler, Olympic gold (1924) medal in the men's freestyle light heavyweight
- Norman Taber (1913) – runner, Olympic gold (1912) medal in the 3000m relay
- Vincent Zhou (2023) – figure skater, Olympic silver in the team event (2022)
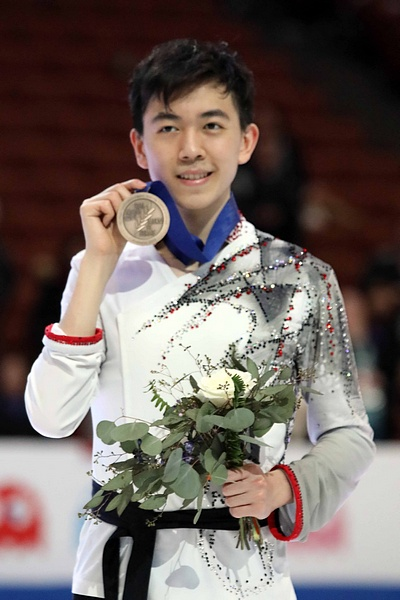
  Vincent Zhou (2023)

==== Silver ====
- Lauren Gibbs (2006) – bobsledder, Olympic silver (2018) medalist in women's doubles bobsled
- Jonathan Smith (1983) – rower, Olympic silver (1984) and bronze (1988) medalist in the coxless four and men's eight
- Sarah Herndon (1983) – sailor, Olympic silver (2000) medalist in Women's 470 (crew) team
- John Welchli (1950) – rower, Olympic silver (1956)

==== Bronze ====
- Igor Boraska (1995) – Croatian rower, Olympic bronze (2000) medal in the eights competition
- Robert Bennett (1949) – athlete, Olympic bronze (1948) medal in the men's hammer throw
- Charles Thomas Butler (1955) – bobsledder, Olympic bronze (1956) medal in the four-man
- Emilie Bydwell (2008) – rugby 7s coach, coached the United States women's national rugby sevens team to an Olympic bronze in the 2024 Summer Olympics
- John Collier (1929) – athlete, Olympic bronze (1928) medal in the 110-metre hurdles
- Pam Dreyer (2003) – ice hockey player, Olympic bronze (2006) medal in the women's tournament
- Glen Foster (1952) – sailor, Olympic bronze (1972) medal in the Tempest class
- David Hall (1901) – runner, Olympic bronze (1900) medalist in the 800-meter race
- Henry Hollingsworth (2022) – rower, Olympic bronze (2024) medal in the men's eight
- Kim Insalaco (2003) – ice hockey player, Olympic bronze (2006) medal in the women's tournament
- Kathleen Kauth (2001) – ice hockey player, Olympic bronze (2006) medalist in the women's tournament
- Janet Leung (2016) – Canadian softball player, Olympic bronze (2020)
- Ted Patton (1988) – rower, Olympic bronze (1988)
- Jimmy Pedro (A.B. 1994) – most decorated American male judo athlete; Judo World Champion (1999); two-time Olympic bronze medalist (1996, 2004)
- Donald Whiston (1951) – ice hockey player, Olympic bronze (1952) medal in the men's tournament

==== Competitors ====
- Hanna Barakat (2022) – Palestinian–American runner, competed at the 2020 Summer Olympics
- Porter Collins (A.B. 1998) – rower and financial analyst, competitor in the 1996 Summer Olympics and 2000 Summer Olympics, involved in betting against the collateralized debt obligation bubble as depicted in The Big Short
- Dick Dreissigacker (1969) – rower, competed in the 1972 Summer Olympics
- Cicely Madden (2018) – rower, competed at the 2020 Summer Olympics
- Rajanya Shah (1996) – rower, competed at the 2000 Summer Olympics
- Jagger Stephens (2020) – Guamanian swimmer, competed at the 2020 Summer Olympics
- Nikola Stojić (1997) – Serbian rower, competed in four consecutive Summer Olympics (2000, 2004, 2008, 2012)
- Evan Weinstock (1914) – bobsledder, competed at the 2018 Winter Olympics
- Anders Weiss (2016) – rower, competed at the 2020 Summer Olympics
- Anna Willard (2006) – 2008 Olympic qualifier in 3000m steeplechase, American record holder in 3000m steeplechase
- Joanna Zeiger (1992) – fourth in inaugural Olympic Women's Triathlon, 2000 Summer Olympics, Sydney; Olympic trial qualifier in marathon, triathlon and swimming; world champion in triathlon

=== Other sports ===
- Rhett Bernstein (2009) – professional soccer player
- Mark Donohue (1959) – professional race car driver; 1972 Indianapolis 500 winner; fatally injured in a crash in practice for the Formula One 1975 Austrian Grand Prix; inducted into the Motorsports Hall of Fame of America and the International Motorsports Hall of Fame (1991)
- Charlie Enright (2008) – sailor, winning skipper of 2023 The Ocean Race
- Cory Gibbs (2001) – professional soccer player, Charlton Athletic, FA Premier League
- Fred Hovey (1890) – professional tennis player, US Open Men's Doubles Champion (1893) and Men's Singles Champion (1895)
- Jeff Larentowicz (2005) – professional soccer player, New England Revolution, Major League Soccer
- Bill Wirtz (1950) – owner of the Chicago Blackhawks

== Colonial era graduates (1769–1783) ==
- Burgiss Allison (D.D. 1777) – chaplain of the United States House of Representatives (1816–1820)
- Barnabus Binney (1774) – physician
- Solomon Drowne (A.B. 1773) – physician

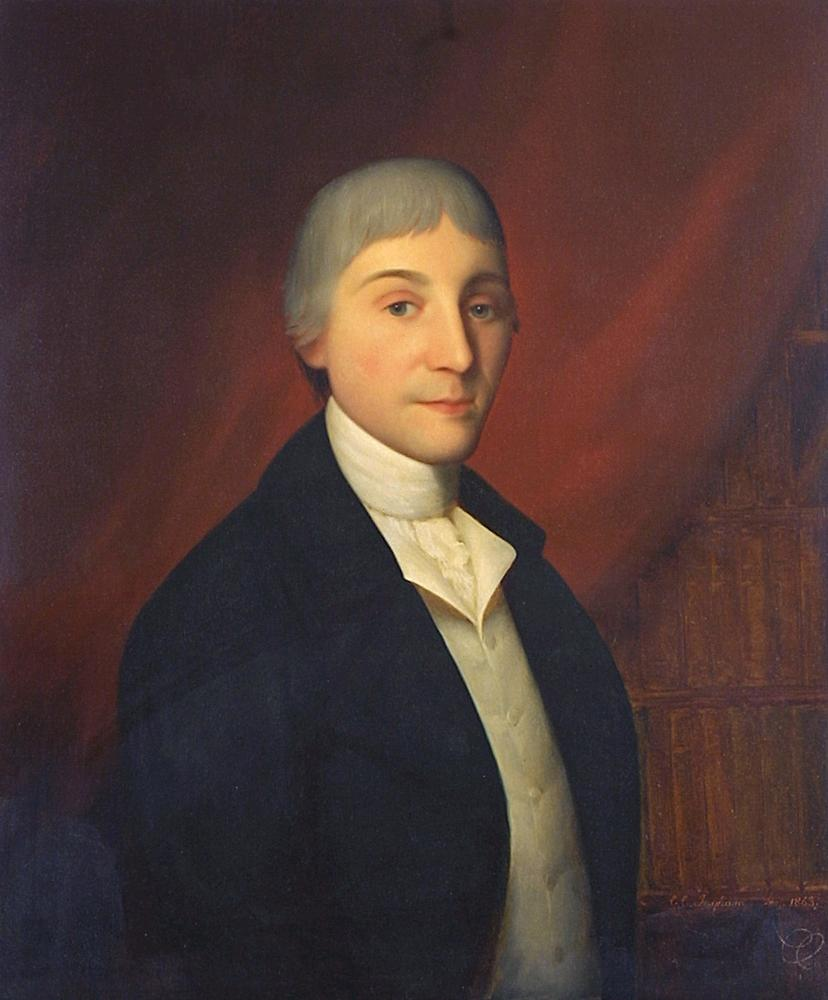
Solomon Drowne

- Dwight Foster (A.B. 1770) – United States Senator from Massachusetts, Member of the U.S. House of Representatives from Massachusetts
- Theodore Foster (A.B. 1770) – United States senator from Rhode Island
- David Howell (A.M. 1769) – delegate to the Congress of the Confederation
- Joshua Toulmin (A.M. 1769) – English dissenting minister
- James Mitchell Varnum (A.B. 1769) – leader of 1st Rhode Island Regiment, widely regarded as the first Black battalion in U.S. history
- Samuel Ward Jr. (A.B. 1771) – delegate to the Hartford Convention

== Unclassified ==
- Susan Bennett (1971) – voice actress, original voice of Apple's Siri
- Michael V. Bhatia (A.B. 1999) – Secretary of Defense Medal for the Defense of Freedom recipient
- Nathan Bishop (1837) – first superintendent of schools in Providence and Boston; led the creation of Bishop College
- Florencio Campomanes (A.M. 1951) – former president of the World Chess Federation
- Amy Carter (Class of 1989) – daughter of former president Jimmy Carter; political activist
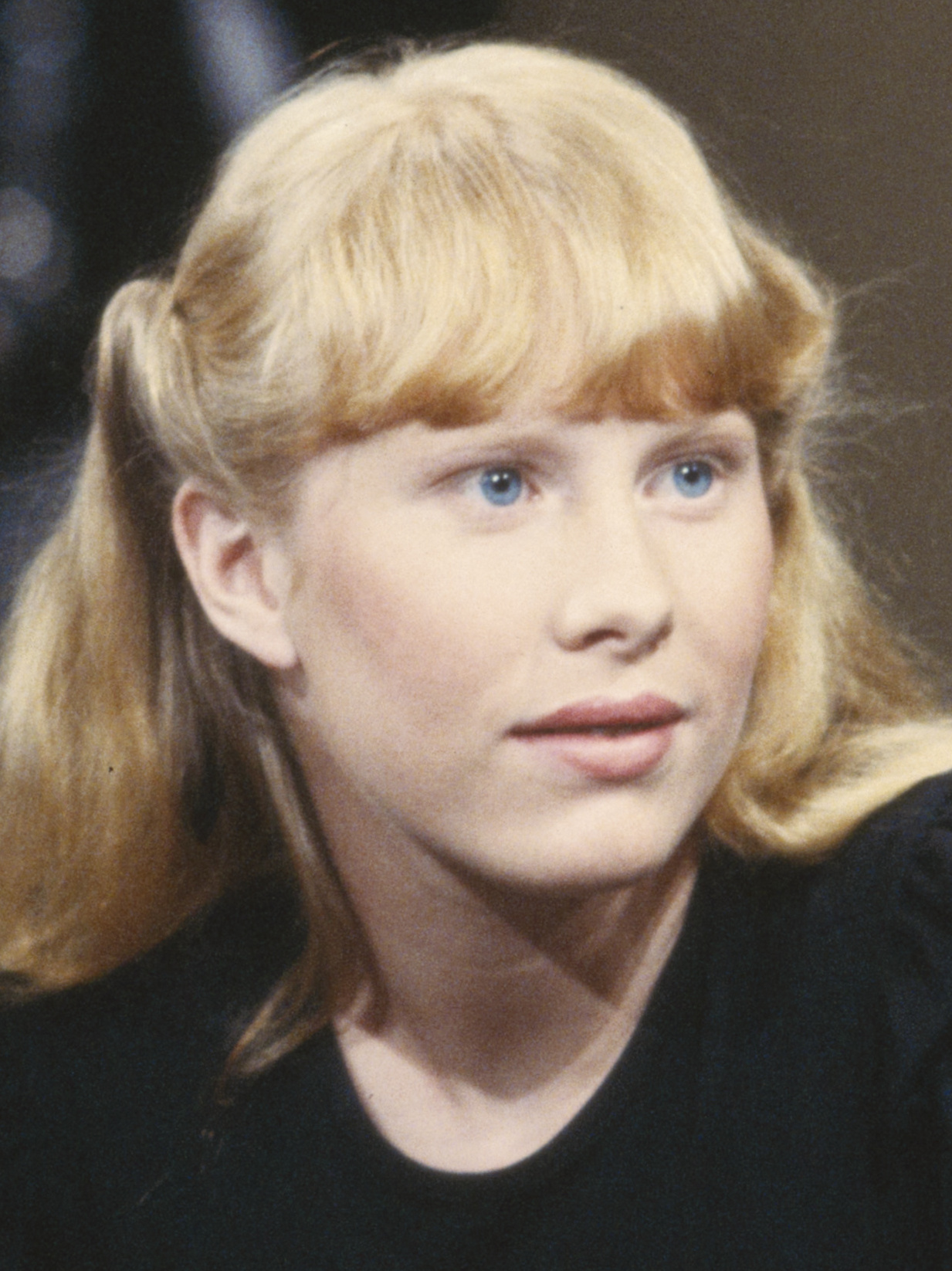
  Amy Carter
- Andrew Dexter Jr. (A.B. 1798) – founder of Montgomery, Alabama
- Ze Frank (B.Sc. 1995) – online content creator
- Isaac Haxton (2008) – professional poker player
- Douglas Harriman Kennedy (A.B.) – tenth child of Robert F. Kennedy and Ethel Kennedy
- Jaime Green (A.B. 1999) – first lady of Hawaii, wife of governor Josh Green
- Casey Johnson (2001) – socialite, heiress of Johnson & Johnson, daughter of Nancy Sale & Woody Johnson
- Alexandra Kerry (A.B. 1997) – daughter of presidential candidate and U.S. Senator John Kerry
- Sadad Ibrahim Al Husseini (M.S. 1970, Ph.D. 1973) – oil and gas industry expert
- Theodore Morde (1935–36) – famed explorer and adventurer who claimed to have discovered the "Lost City of the Monkey God" in Honduras
- Cara Mund (A.B. 2016) – Miss America 2018
- John Davis Pierce (1822) – founder of the Michigan public school system
- Sonja Santelises (A.B. 1989) – CEO, Baltimore City Public Schools
- Thomas B. Stockwell (A.B. 1862, A.M. 1865) – 8th commissioner of public schools of Rhode Island
