= List of United States federal courthouses in Rhode Island =

Following is a list of current and former courthouses of the United States federal court system located in Rhode Island. Each entry indicates the name of the building along with an image, if available, its location and the jurisdiction it covers, the dates during which it was used for each such jurisdiction, and, if applicable the person for whom it was named, and the date of renaming. Dates of use will not necessarily correspond with the dates of construction or demolition of a building, as pre-existing structures may be adapted or court use, and former court buildings may later be put to other uses. Also, the official name of the building may be changed at some point after its use as a federal court building has been initiated.

== Courthouses ==
Courthouse	City	Image	Street address	Jurisdiction	Dates of use	Named for
John E. Fogarty Judicial Annex	Providence†		24 Weybosset Street	D.R.I.	1857–1908; Now in use by Rhode Island state courts.	U.S. Rep. John E. Fogarty (renamed after federal usage ceased)
Federal Building^{†}	Providence		1 Exchange Terrace	D.R.I.	1908–present	n/a
John O. Pastore Federal Building	Providence		2 Exchange Terrace	D.R.I.	1940–present	Governor John O. Pastore (1977)

== Key ==
^{†}	Listed on the National Register of Historic Places (NRHP)
^{††}	NRHP-listed and also designated as a National Historic Landmark
