= Attorney General Hartigan =

Attorney General Hartigan may refer to:

- John Patrick Hartigan (1887–1968), Attorney General of Rhode Island
- Neil Hartigan (born 1938), Attorney General of Illinois
