= Melissa R. DuBose =

American judge (born 1968)

Melissa DuBose
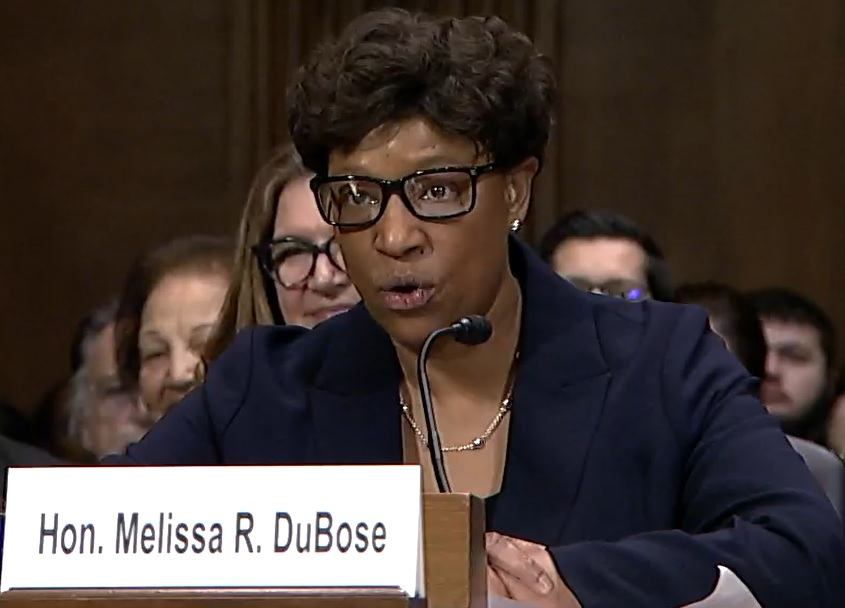

Judge of the United States District Court for the District of Rhode Island
- Incumbent
- Assumed office January 2, 2025
- Appointed by: Joe Biden
- Preceded by: William Smith

Personal details
- Born: Melissa Raye DuBose; 1968 (age 57–58) Providence, Rhode Island, U.S.
- Party: Democratic
- Education: Providence College (BA); Roger Williams University (JD)

Melissa Raye DuBose (born 1968) is an American lawyer who has served as a United States district judge of the United States District Court for the District of Rhode Island since 2025. She previously served as an associate judge of the Rhode Island District Court from 2019 to 2025.

== Education ==
DeBose graduated from Providence College with a degree in political science in 1990 and became a public school social studies teacher in Providence. She graduated from the Roger Williams University School of Law in 2004.

== Career ==
She was a special assistant attorney of the Rhode Island Attorney General’s Office from 2005 to 2008. From 2008 to 2019, DuBose was recruited to be the U.S. legal counsel for Schneider Electric, where she worked in corporate compliance, ethics, and fair trade. In 2019, she was appointed by Rhode Island Governor Gina Raimondo to the Rhode Island District Court.

=== Federal judicial service ===
On January 10, 2024, President Joe Biden announced his intent to nominate DuBose to serve as a United States district judge of the United States District Court for the District of Rhode Island. On February 1, 2024, President Biden nominated DuBose to a seat being vacated by Judge William E. Smith, who subsequently assumed senior status on January 1, 2025. On February 8, 2024, a hearing on her nomination before the Senate Judiciary Committee. During her confirmation hearing, she was questioned by Senator John Kennedy over an article from 2000 in which DuBose was quoted as saying, “I was in my Marxist phase.” On March 7, 2024, her nomination was reported out of committee by a 12–9 vote. On March 12, 2024, the United States Senate invoked cloture on her nomination by a 51–48 vote, with Senator Joe Manchin voting against the motion. Later that day, her nomination was confirmed by a 51–47 vote, with Senator Manchin voting against her confirmation. She received her judicial commission on January 2, 2025, and was sworn in on January 3, 2025. DuBose became the first person of color and first openly LGBTQ judge to serve on the U.S. District Court for the District of Rhode Island.

After the second Trump administration intentionally did not disclose to the court that someone DuBose ordered released ("pending a bond hearing before an immigration judge") was wanted by the Dominican Republic in connection to a murder investigation, in a hearing on a Department of Homeland Security press release which said DuBose released a "Violent Criminal Illegal Alien Wanted for Murder", DuBose ordered the administration "to show cause why they should not be held in contempt for failure to notify the Court of facts relevant to Petitioner's dangerousness and/or criminal history." The Department's general counsel, James H. Percival subsequently wrote that DuBose "caused the problem".

== See also ==
- List of African American federal judges
- List of African American jurists
- List of LGBT jurists in the United States

Legal offices
Preceded by William Smith	Judge of the United States District Court for the District of Rhode Island; 2025–present	Incumbent
