= Judge Torres =

Judge Torres may refer to:

- Analisa Torres (born 1959), judge of the United States District Court for the Southern District of New York
- Ernest C. Torres (born 1941, judge of the United States District Court for the District of Rhode Island
- Florentino Torres (1844–1927), judge of the Court of First Instance of Ilocos Sur, and later associate justice of the Supreme Court of the Philippines
