= Bruce M. Selya =

American judge (1934–2025)

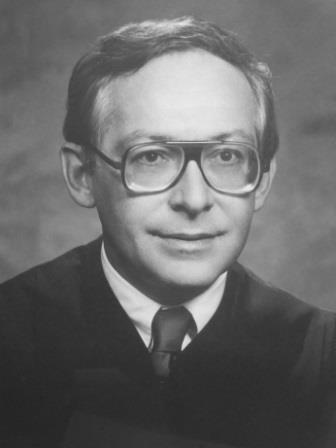

Presiding Judge of the United States Foreign Intelligence Surveillance Court of Review
- In office May 19, 2008 – May 19, 2012
- Appointed by: John Roberts
- Preceded by: Edward Leavy
- Succeeded by: Morris S. Arnold

Judge of the United States Foreign Intelligence Surveillance Court of Review
- In office October 8, 2005 – May 19, 2012
- Appointed by: John Roberts
- Preceded by: Edward Leavy
- Succeeded by: José A. Cabranes

Senior Judge of the United States Court of Appeals for the First Circuit
- In office December 31, 2006 – February 22, 2025

Judge of the United States Court of Appeals for the First Circuit
- In office October 14, 1986 – December 31, 2006
- Appointed by: Ronald Reagan
- Preceded by: Seat established
- Succeeded by: O. Rogeriee Thompson

Judge of the United States District Court for the District of Rhode Island
- In office August 18, 1982 – November 24, 1986
- Appointed by: Ronald Reagan
- Preceded by: Raymond James Pettine
- Succeeded by: Ernest C. Torres

Personal details
- Born: Bruce Marshall Selya; May 27, 1934 Providence, Rhode Island, U.S.
- Died: February 22, 2025 (aged 90) Providence, Rhode Island, U.S.
- Party: Republican
- Education: Harvard University (AB, LLB)

Bruce Marshall Selya (May 27, 1934 – February 22, 2025) was an American judge who was a United States circuit judge of the United States Court of Appeals for the First Circuit. Born in Rhode Island, he practiced law and participated in Republican politics before his appointment to the U.S. District Court for the District of Rhode Island in 1982. Elevated to the First Circuit four years later, he gained a reputation for his distinctive writing style, which often involved peppering opinions with figures of speech, puns, and extremely uncommon words.

== Education and career ==
Bruce Marshall Selya was born on May 27, 1934, in Providence, Rhode Island, to a Jewish family. He attended Nathan Bishop Middle School and Classical High School in Providence. Selya received an Artium Baccalaureus degree from Harvard University in 1955 and a Bachelor of Laws from Harvard Law School in 1958. He was a law clerk for Judge Edward William Day of the United States District Court for the District of Rhode Island from 1958 to 1960. Selya was in private practice of law in Providence from 1960 to 1982. He was a Judge of Probate in Lincoln, Rhode Island, from 1965 to 1972.

Selya was the Republican candidate for Rhode Island Attorney General in the 1964 election, losing to incumbent J. Joseph Nugent. He was an informal adviser to Governor John Chafee and chaired both his gubernatorial reelection campaign and his successful 1976 U.S. Senate bid. From 1969 to 1974, Selya was vice-chairman of Rhode Island's Republican State Central Committee.

== District judge ==
Selya was nominated by President Ronald Reagan on July 27, 1982, to a seat on the United States District Court for the District of Rhode Island vacated by Judge Raymond James Pettine. He was confirmed by the United States Senate on August 18, 1982, and received his commission the same day. He was the first Jewish person to serve as a federal judge for the District of Rhode Island.

== Court of appeals ==
Selya was nominated by President Reagan on September 26, 1986, to the United States Court of Appeals for the First Circuit, to a new seat created by 98 Stat. 333. He was confirmed by the Senate on October 8, 1986, and received his commission on October 14, 1986. A 1985 Newsweek article claimed that the White House had promised to elevate Selya in order to secure Senator John Chafee's vote on the MX missile; the article stated that Selya was an ideological "renegade" who was otherwise "out of favor" with the conservative Justice Department because he had represented abortion clinics while in private practice.

When the en banc First Circuit in 2005 upheld a voluntary desegregation plan in Lynn, Massachusetts, that considered race when evaluating student transfer decisions, Selya dissented, writing that the program "flies in the teeth of the Supreme Court's stalwart opposition to the use of inflexible, race-determinative methods". A 2008 decision by Selya in IMS Health Inc. v. Ayotte upheld a New Hampshire law that prohibited the sale of information about doctors' prescribing practices; the Supreme Court struck down a similar law in Sorrell v. IMS Health Inc. Selya wrote for a unanimous panel ruling in favor of Boston when it refused to fly a Christian flag on a city flagpole, arguing that the government was free to choose which messages it endorsed. The Supreme Court unanimously held in Shurtleff v. City of Boston (2022) that the city had violated the First Amendment.

In 1996, Selya hired future Supreme Court Justice Ketanji Brown Jackson as one of his law clerks for the year. He praised her as a "terrific addition" when President Biden nominated her to the Supreme Court in 2022, and she described him as "a brilliant, meticulous, and scholarly practitioner of the law" in her memoir Lovely One.

In 2000, Chief Justice William Rehnquist appointed Selya to the Judicial Panel on Multidistrict Litigation, a position he held until 2004. In 2005, Chief Justice John Roberts appointed Selya to the Foreign Intelligence Surveillance Court of Review, and in 2008 he became its chief judge. He wrote a 2008 decision upholding the Protect America Act of 2007, which permitted warrantless wiretapping of the international communications of Americans suspected of espionage or terrorism.

Judge Selya assumed senior status at the end of 2006. President George W. Bush nominated District Judge William E. Smith to succeed him in 2007, but the nomination was not acted upon. On October 6, 2009, President Barack Obama formally nominated O. Rogeriee Thompson to Selya's seat on the First Circuit. She was confirmed by the Senate in a 98–0 vote on March 17, 2010.

== Writing style ==
Selya was known for the distinctive and playful quality of his prose. Selya said that because he had often found judicial decisions sleep-inducing as a lawyer, he had committed himself as a judge to demonstrating that "sound jurisprudence and interesting prose are not mutually exclusive". The most noteworthy feature of his opinions was their frequent use of very uncommon words, from "philotheoparoptesism" and "rodomontade" to "salmagundi" and "sockdolager". In a 2006 interview, he said: "There are no such things as obscure words; there are just words that are temporarily abandoned. It's part of my responsibility to resuscitate them." But he disclaimed "lexiphanicism for its own sake" and said that if a word "does not fit, I won't submit".

He deployed unusual figures of speech. One opinion included the line: "We find this to be a ketchup-bottle type of argument: it looks quite full, but it is remarkably difficult to get anything useful out of it." In another, he wrote that "the appellant’s asseverational array is all meringue and no pie." Although he did so less frequently in his later years, Selya's earlier decisions often used puns: in one opinion involving the International Ladies Garment Workers Union, he wrote that "a lingerie manufacturer made a slip", that "plaintiffs' own filings place them in the tightest of corsets", and that the union had "played pantywaist". A 1987 case concerning a company called Brad Foote Gear Works included the phrases "does not toe the mark", "sidesteps the established principle", and "the shoe, fitting, must be worn".

Selya's opinions were heavily cited by fellow judges, but his style sometimes came under criticism from scholars and jurists. Bryan Garner, a noted scholar of legal writing, described his vocabulary choices as "pompous" and his puns as "mean-spirited"; he wrote about Selya in an article entitled "Cruel and Unusual English: When Judges Play with Words". According to federal district judge Nancy Gertner: "Sometimes Judge Selya crosses the line. We're not gods on high. We need to be as clear as possible." Selya's First Circuit colleague Juan Torruella, meanwhile, enjoyed borrowing words such as "struthious" from him, saying: "If people have to look it up, that's OK. It makes people think about his decisions."

== Death and legacy ==
Selya died in Providence on February 22, 2025, at the age of 90. Upon his death, US Senator Jack Reed described Selya as "a legal legend" and "a man of great wisdom, integrity, modesty, wit, and high ethical standards". Professor Michael J. Yelnosky, former dean of the Roger Williams University School of Law, described him as "the greatest jurist in Rhode Island history".

== See also ==
- List of Jewish American jurists

== Sources ==
Party political offices
Preceded by Arthur Votolato	Republican nominee for Attorney General of Rhode Island; 1964	Succeeded by Herbert F. DeSimone
Legal offices
Preceded by Raymond James Pettine	Judge of the United States District Court for the District of Rhode Island; 1982–1986	Succeeded by Ernest C. Torres
New seat	Judge of the United States Court of Appeals for the First Circuit; 1986–2006	Succeeded by O. Rogeriee Thompson
Preceded by Ralph B. Guy Jr.	Judge of the United States Foreign Intelligence Surveillance Court of Review; 2005–2012	Succeeded by José A. Cabranes
Preceded by Edward Leavy	Presiding Judge of the United States Foreign Intelligence Surveillance Court of Review; 2008–2012	Succeeded by Morris S. Arnold
