= Judge Mahoney =

Judge Mahoney may refer to:

- J. Daniel Mahoney (1931–1996), judge of the United States Court of Appeals for the Second Circuit
- John Christopher Mahoney (1882–1952), judge of the United States Court of Appeals for the First Circuit
- Pat Mahoney (1929–2012), Canadian judge of the Federal Court of Appeal
- Paul Mahoney (English judge) (born 1946), British judge of the European Court of Human Rights
