= Aaron L. Weisman =

American lawyer (born 1965)

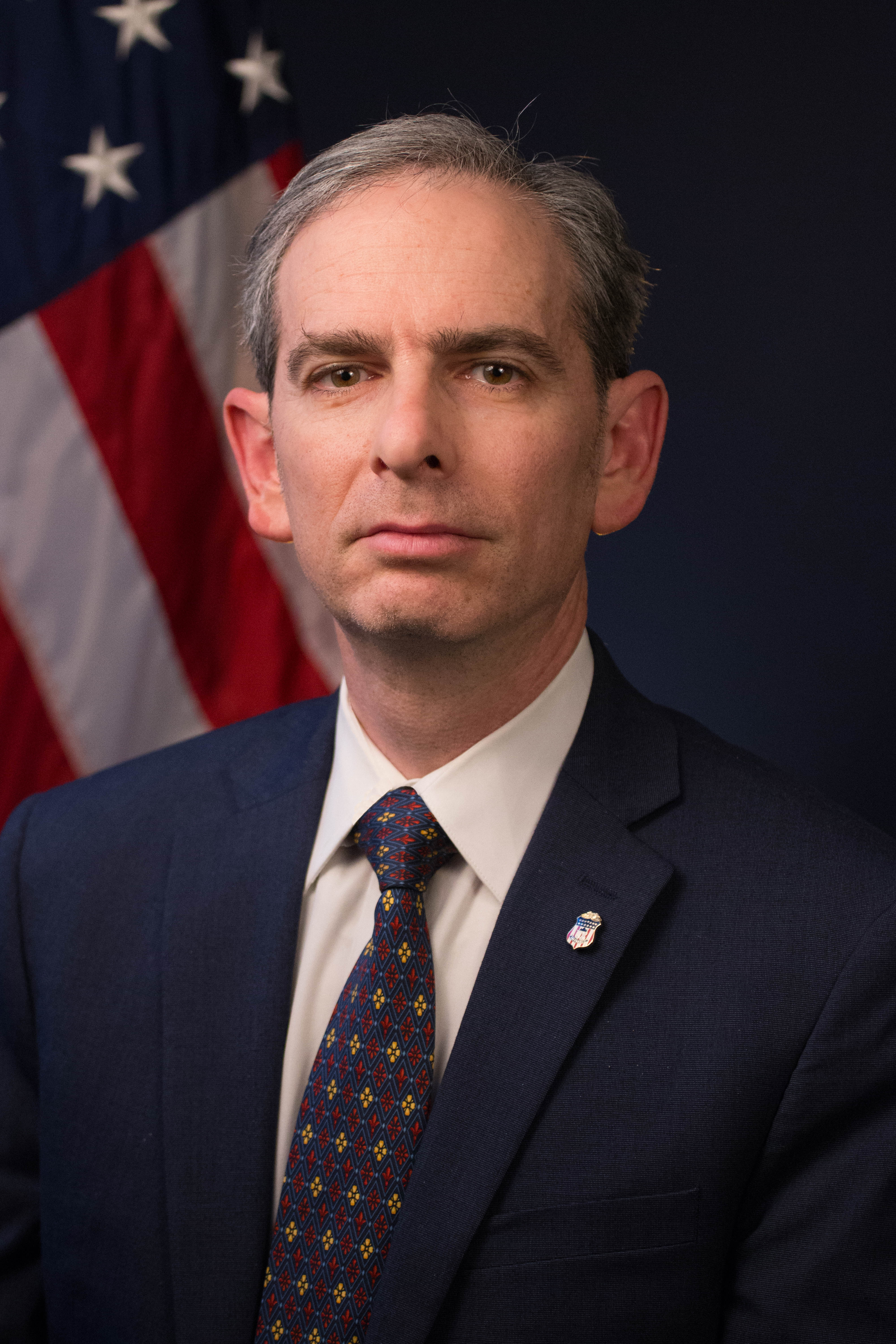

United States Attorney for the District of Rhode Island
- In office January 14, 2019 – February 28, 2021
- President: Donald Trump; Joe Biden
- Preceded by: Peter Neronha
- Succeeded by: Zachary A. Cunha

Personal details
- Born: May 1965 (age 61)
- Education: Brandeis University (B.A.); Benjamin N. Cardozo School of Law (J.D.)

Aaron L. Weisman (born 1965) is an American attorney who served as the United States Attorney for the District of Rhode Island from 2019 to 2021.

== Education ==
Weisman received his Bachelor of Arts from Brandeis University and his Juris Doctor from Benjamin N. Cardozo School of Law.

== Legal career ==
Prior to joining the office of the Rhode Island Attorney General, Weisman worked for Jones Associates, a Providence, Rhode Island law firm specializing in appellate practice. He previously served as a special assistant attorney general in the criminal appeals unit. During his tenure at the Rhode Island Attorney General's Office, he represented Rhode Island's criminal justice interests before the Supreme Court of Rhode Island in hundreds of felony cases, including the appellate litigation of many of Rhode Island's most consequential criminal justice matters. He also oversaw the Rhode Island Attorney General's post-conviction relief unit, responsible for ensuring the just and orderly processing of collateral attacks on felony judgments of conviction, and has appeared in federal court, including an appearance before the Supreme Court of the United States, to defend Rhode Island's interest in the finality of its criminal convictions.

He previously served as an Assistant Attorney General and the Chief of the Rhode Island Attorney General's criminal appeals unit. Weisman held that position from January 1993 to January 2019 and under four attorneys general.

== United States Attorney ==
On October 10, 2018, President Donald Trump nominated Weisman to be the U.S. Attorney for the District of Rhode Island. On November 13, 2018, his nomination was sent to the United States Senate. On January 2, 2019, his nomination was confirmed by voice vote. He was sworn into office on January 14, 2019.

On February 8, 2021, he along with 55 other Trump-era attorneys were asked to resign. He resigned on February 28, 2021.
