= Edward L. Leahy =

American judge and attorney

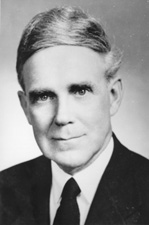

Judge of the United States District Court for the District of Rhode Island
- In office January 3, 1951 – July 22, 1953
- Appointed by: Harry S. Truman
- Preceded by: John Patrick Hartigan
- Succeeded by: Edward William Day

United States Senator from Rhode Island
- In office August 24, 1949 – December 18, 1950
- Appointed by: John Pastore
- Preceded by: J. Howard McGrath
- Succeeded by: John Pastore

Personal details
- Born: Edward Lawrence Leahy; February 9, 1886 Bristol, Rhode Island
- Died: July 22, 1953 (aged 67) Bristol, Rhode Island
- Resting place: North Cemetery
- Party: Democratic
- Education: Georgetown Law (LL.B.)

Edward Lawrence Leahy (February 9, 1886 – July 22, 1953) was an American attorney serving as United States Senator from Rhode Island and a United States district judge of the United States District Court for the District of Rhode Island.

== Education and career ==
Born in Bristol, Rhode Island, Leahy attended the public schools and attended Brown University in 1904 and 1905. He received a Bachelor of Laws from Georgetown Law in 1908 and was admitted to the Rhode Island bar the same year. He was in private practice of law in Bristol starting in 1908. He was a judge of the Probate Court in Bristol from 1910 to 1939. He was elected to the Bristol school committee in 1913. He was a member of the Rhode Island House of Representatives from 1911 to 1913. He served as a master of chancery for the Rhode Island Superior Court. He served in the United States Army as a lieutenant in the Judge Advocate General's Department during World War I. He was administrator of state taxes for Rhode Island from 1919 to 1948. He was director of the State Department of Revenue and Regulation for Rhode Island in 1939. He was a member and director of finance for the Rhode Island State Sinking Fund Commission from 1942 to 1946. He was a member of the Rhode Island State Retirement Board from 1942 to 1946. He was an adviser for the Rhode Island State Department of Finance from 1948 to 1949.

== Congressional service ==
Leahy was appointed on August 24, 1949, as a Democrat to the United States Senate to fill the vacancy caused by the resignation of United States Senator J. Howard McGrath and served from August 24, 1949, to December 18, 1950, a successor having been elected and qualified. He was not a candidate for election to the vacancy.

== Federal judicial service ==
Leahy was nominated by President Harry S. Truman on December 21, 1950, to a seat on the United States District Court for the District of Rhode Island vacated by Judge John Patrick Hartigan. He was confirmed by the United States Senate on January 2, 1951, and received his commission on January 3, 1951. His service was terminated on July 22, 1953, due to his death in Bristol. He was interred in North Cemetery.

== Sources ==
- "Edward Lawrence Leahy". Biographical Directory of the United States Congress.

U.S. Senate
Preceded by J. Howard McGrath	U.S. senator (Class 1) from Rhode Island; 1949–1950; Served alongside: Theodore F. Green	Succeeded by John Pastore
Legal offices
Preceded by John Patrick Hartigan	Judge of the United States District Court for the District of Rhode Island; 1951–1953	Succeeded by Edward William Day
