= William E. Smith (judge) =

American judge (born 1959)

William Edward Smith
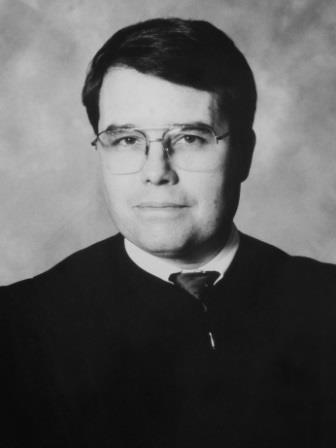

Senior Judge of the United States District Court for the District of Rhode Island
- In office January 1, 2025 – January 21, 2026

Chief Judge of the United States District Court for the District of Rhode Island
- In office November 30, 2013 – November 30, 2019
- Preceded by: Mary M. Lisi
- Succeeded by: John J. McConnell Jr.

Judge of the United States District Court for the District of Rhode Island
- In office November 15, 2002 – January 1, 2025
- Appointed by: George W. Bush
- Preceded by: Ronald Rene Lagueux
- Succeeded by: Melissa R. DuBose

Personal details
- Born: William Edward Smith; December 31, 1959 (age 66) Boise, Idaho, U.S.
- Education: Georgetown University (BA, JD)

William Edward Smith (born December 31, 1959) is a retired United States district judge of the United States District Court for the District of Rhode Island and a former federal judicial nominee to the United States Court of Appeals for the First Circuit.

== Background ==
Smith received his Bachelor of Arts degree from Georgetown University in 1982 and his Juris Doctor cum laude from Georgetown University Law Center in 1987.

He was in private practice in Providence, Rhode Island, from 1987 until 2000. From 1993 until 1998, he was also a part-time judge in the town of West Warwick. Smith was the staff director of the Rhode Island office of United States Senator Lincoln Chafee from 2000 until 2001. From 2001 to 2002, he returned to private practice in Providence.

From 2001 to 2002, Smith was an adjunct professor at Providence College. He currently teaches as an adjunct professor at Roger Williams University School of Law.

=== Federal judicial service ===
Smith was nominated by President George W. Bush on July 18, 2002, to a seat on the United States District Court for the District of Rhode Island vacated by Ronald R. Lagueux. He was confirmed by the United States Senate on November 14, 2002, and received his commission on November 15, 2002. He was the chief judge from November 30, 2013 to November 30, 2019. Smith assumed senior status on January 1, 2025, and retired on January 21, 2026.

=== Expired court of appeals nomination under Bush ===
Smith was nominated on December 6, 2007, by President George W. Bush to a seat on the United States Court of Appeals for the First Circuit vacated by Judge Bruce M. Selya, who assumed senior status on December 31, 2006. Rhode Island's two Democratic senators, Jack Reed and Sheldon Whitehouse, both of whom had been cut out of Smith's selection by the White House, issued a lukewarm joint response to the nomination: "Before giving someone a lifetime appointment to the federal bench we need to carefully review their record. We will be sure to give Judge Smith’s nomination thorough and independent review." Previously, Whitehouse had suggested in September 2007 that the Senate should not consider any Bush appointment for the First Circuit that late in the president’s term. On January 2, 2009, his nomination was returned to the president under Rule XXXI, Paragraph 6 of the United States Senate.

== Sources ==
Legal offices
Preceded by Ronald Rene Lagueux	Judge of the United States District Court for the District of Rhode Island; 2002–2025	Succeeded by Melissa R. DuBose
Preceded by Mary M. Lisi	Chief Judge of the United States District Court for the District of Rhode Island; 2013–2019	Succeeded by John J. McConnell Jr.
