= Ira Lloyd Letts =

American judge

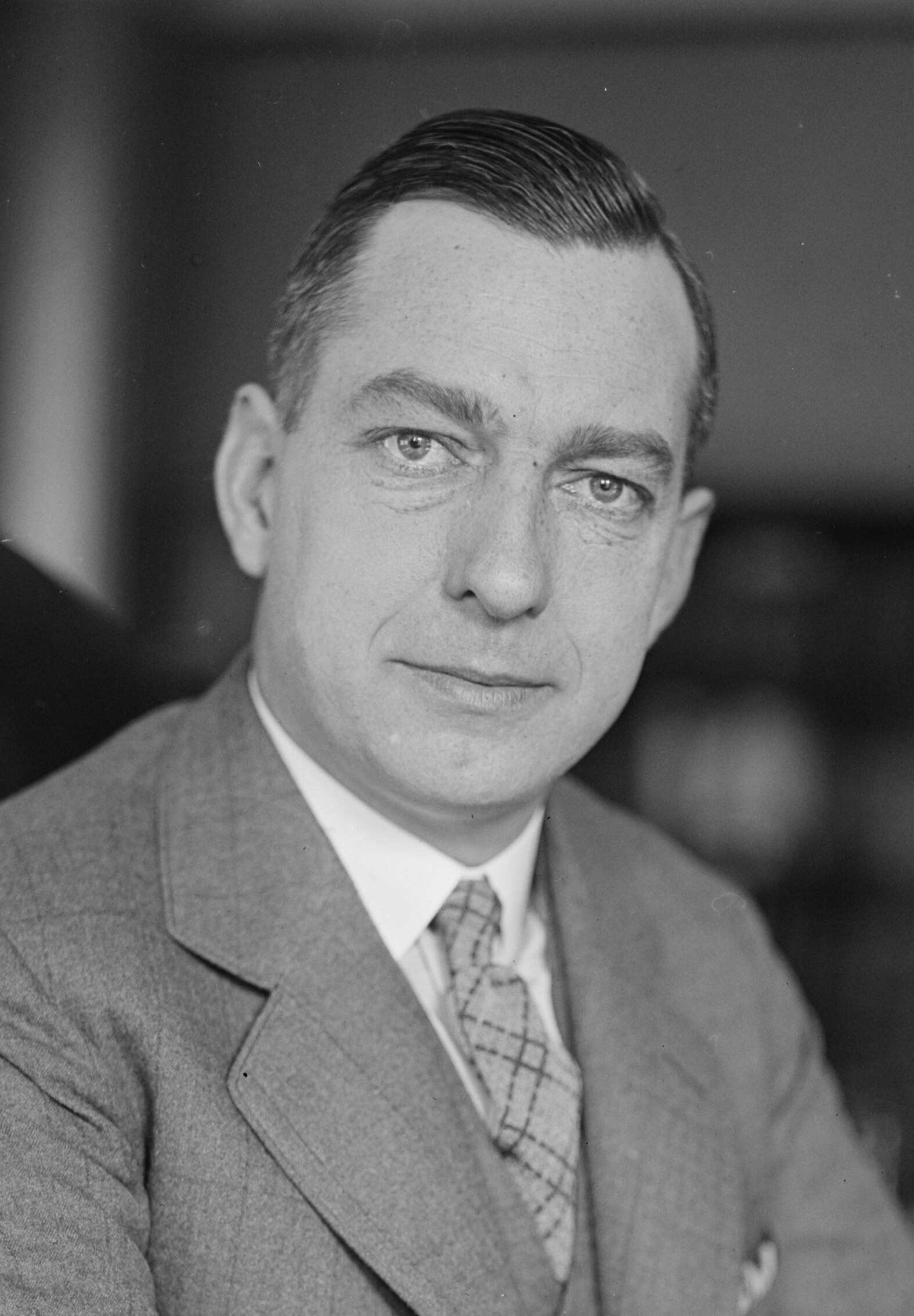

Judge of the United States District Court for the District of Rhode Island
- In office June 9, 1927 – June 24, 1935
- Appointed by: Calvin Coolidge
- Preceded by: Arthur Lewis Brown
- Succeeded by: John Christopher Mahoney

Personal details
- Born: Ira Lloyd Letts; May 29, 1889 Cortland County, New York, U.S.
- Died: November 24, 1947 (aged 58) Boston, Massachusetts, U.S.
- Education: Brown University (Ph.B., M.A.); Columbia Law School (LL.B.)

Ira Lloyd Letts (May 29, 1889 – November 24, 1947) was a United States district judge of the United States District Court for the District of Rhode Island.

== Education and career ==
Born in Cortland County, New York, Letts received a Bachelor of Philosophy degree from Brown University in 1913, a Master of Arts degree from the same institution in 1914, and a Bachelor of Laws from Columbia Law School in 1917. He was in private practice in Providence, Rhode Island from 1917 to 1925. He was an Assistant United States Attorney General in the United States Department of Justice from 1925 to 1927.

== Federal judicial service ==
Letts received a recess appointment from President Calvin Coolidge on June 9, 1927, to a seat on the United States District Court for the District of Rhode Island vacated by Judge Arthur Lewis Brown. He was nominated to the same position by President Coolidge on December 6, 1927. He was confirmed by the United States Senate on January 4, 1928, and received his commission the same day. His service terminated on June 24, 1935, due to his resignation.

== Later career and death ==
After his resignation from the federal bench, Letts returned to private practice in Providence from 1935 to 1947. He died on November 24, 1947, in Boston, Massachusetts.

== Sources ==
Party political offices
Preceded by Jesse H. Metcalf	Republican nominee for U.S. Senator from Rhode Island (Class 2); 1942	Succeeded by Thomas P. Hazard
Legal offices
Preceded by Arthur Lewis Brown	Judge of the United States District Court for the District of Rhode Island; 1927–1935	Succeeded by John Christopher Mahoney
