= George Moulton Carpenter Jr. =

American judge

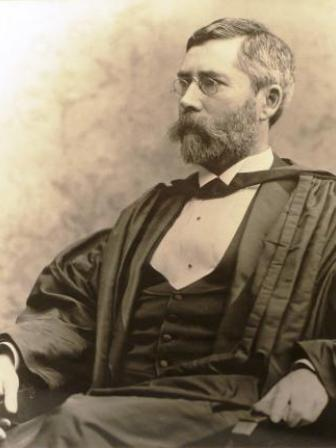

Judge of the United States District Court for the District of Rhode Island
- In office December 18, 1884 – July 31, 1896
- Appointed by: Chester A. Arthur
- Preceded by: LeBaron Bradford Colt
- Succeeded by: Arthur Lewis Brown

Personal details
- Born: George Moulton Carpenter Jr. April 22, 1844 Portsmouth, Rhode Island, U.S.
- Died: July 31, 1896 (aged 52) Katwijk, Netherlands
- Resting place: Swan Point Cemetery; Providence, Rhode Island
- Education: Brown University

George Moulton Carpenter Jr. (April 22, 1844 – July 31, 1896) was a United States district judge of the United States District Court for the District of Rhode Island.

== Education and career ==
Born on April 22, 1844, in Portsmouth, Rhode Island, Carpenter moved to New Bedford, Massachusetts and attend the public schools of that city, then completed his basic education in the grammar schools of Providence, Rhode Island. For some time he engaged in various employment. He graduated from Brown University with honors in 1864, and was elected to Phi Beta Kappa. He was a reporter for the Providence Evening Press and Providence Daily Journal from 1864 to 1867. He entered private practice in Providence from 1867 to 1882. On July 1, 1880, he was appointed by the Governor of Rhode Island as one of the commissioners to revise the laws of Rhode Island. He was an Associate Justice of the Supreme Court of Rhode Island from 1882 to 1885.

== Federal judicial service ==
Carpenter was nominated by President Chester A. Arthur on December 16, 1884, to a seat on the United States District Court for the District of Rhode Island vacated by Judge LeBaron Bradford Colt. He was confirmed by the United States Senate on December 18, 1884, and received his commission the same day. His service terminated on July 31, 1896, due to his death in Katwijk, South Holland, Netherlands. Carpenter died suddenly while on a European tour for his health. He was interred at Swan Point Cemetery in Providence on September 30, 1896.

== Mason ==
The Masonic Square and Compasses. (Found with or without the letter G)

In Masonry, Carpenter had received the highest honors, having been a 33rd degree Mason for 14 years. He was raised to the degree of Master Mason in St. John's Lodge No. 1 of this city June 18. 1873, and exalted to the degree of Holy Royal Arch in Providence Chapter April 2, 1874. He received the degrees in Providence Council of Royal and Select Masters in June.

== Family ==
Carpenter was a descendant of the Rehoboth Carpenter family who came to America in the mid-1630s.

== Sources ==
Legal offices
Preceded by LeBaron Bradford Colt	Judge of the United States District Court for the District of Rhode Island; 1884–1896	Succeeded by Arthur Lewis Brown
