= Francis J. Boyle =

American judge

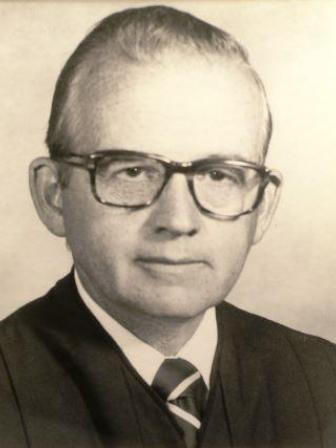

Senior Judge of the United States District Court for the District of Rhode Island
- In office December 1, 1992 – September 11, 2006

Chief Judge of the United States District Court for the District of Rhode Island
- In office 1982–1992
- Preceded by: Raymond James Pettine
- Succeeded by: Ronald Rene Lagueux

Judge of the United States District Court for the District of Rhode Island
- In office July 1, 1977 – December 1, 1992
- Appointed by: Jimmy Carter
- Preceded by: Edward William Day
- Succeeded by: Mary M. Lisi

Personal details
- Born: Francis Joseph Boyle; June 14, 1927 Providence, Rhode Island
- Died: September 11, 2006 (aged 79) Newport, Rhode Island
- Spouse: M. Delores Roderick
- Children: 7
- Education: Boston College (JD)

Military service
- Branch/service: United States Navy
- Years of service: 1945–1946
- Rank: Seaman First Class
- Battles/wars: World War II

Francis Joseph Boyle (June 14, 1927 – September 11, 2006) was a United States district judge of the United States District Court for the District of Rhode Island.

== Education and career ==
Born in Providence, Rhode Island, Boyle was in the United States Navy from 1945 to 1946. He attended Providence College and the University of Michigan-Ann Arbor. He received a Juris Doctor from Boston College Law School in 1952 and was in private practice in Pawtucket, Rhode Island in 1953, and then in Newport, Rhode Island until 1977.

== Federal judicial service ==
On May 2, 1977, Boyle was nominated by President Jimmy Carter to a seat on the United States District Court for the District of Rhode Island vacated by Judge Edward William Day. Boyle was confirmed by the United States Senate on June 30, 1977, and received his commission on July 1, 1977. He served as Chief Judge from 1982 to 1992, assuming senior status on December 1, 1992, and inactive senior status in 1997. He died on September 11, 2006, in Newport.

== Sources ==
- Judges of the United States (1983)

Legal offices
Preceded by Edward William Day	Judge of the United States District Court for the District of Rhode Island; 1977–1992	Succeeded by Mary M. Lisi
Preceded by Raymond James Pettine	Chief Judge of the United States District Court for the District of Rhode Island; 1982–1992	Succeeded by Ronald Rene Lagueux
