= John J. McConnell Jr. =

American judge (born 1958)

John McConnell
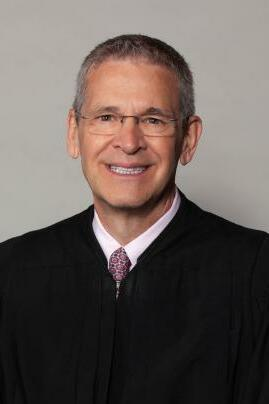

Chief Judge of the United States District Court for the District of Rhode Island
- Incumbent
- Assumed office December 1, 2019
- Preceded by: William Smith

Judge of the United States District Court for the District of Rhode Island
- Incumbent
- Assumed office May 6, 2011
- Appointed by: Barack Obama
- Preceded by: Ernest C. Torres

Personal details
- Born: John James McConnell Jr. 1958 (age 67–68) Providence, Rhode Island, U.S.
- Education: Brown University (BA); Case Western Reserve University (JD)

John James McConnell Jr. (born 1958) is the chief judge of the United States District Court for the District of Rhode Island.

== Early life and education ==
Born in Providence, Rhode Island, McConnell was educated at the Bishop Hendricken High School. He earned a Bachelor of Arts in 1980 from Brown University and a Juris Doctor in 1983 from the Case Western Reserve University School of Law.

== Career ==
From 1983 to 1984, McConnell worked as a law clerk to Rhode Island Supreme Court Associate Justice Donald F. Shea. From 1984 to 1986, he worked as an attorney with Mandell, Goodman, Famiglietti & Schwartz in Providence. From 1986 to 1991, he served as an associate at what now is the law firm Motley Rice. From 1991 to 2011, he was a partner and director of Motley Rice's environmental practice group, where he worked with state and local governments, groups, and individuals in cases of personal injury, property damage, and economic loss as a result of negligent environmental practices.

McConnell may be best known for helping draft and negotiate a $264 billion, 46-state settlement in the states' lawsuit against the tobacco industry. From 1997 to 2000, he helped investigate the case, file the complaints, and conduct discovery and motions practice while representing many states through their attorneys general. Upon his nomination to federal district court, McConnell disclosed in his questionnaire that he anticipated receiving deferred compensation of $2.5–3.1 million per year for every year through 2024 for his work in the tobacco settlement.

McConnell was active in politics, serving 14 years as treasurer of the Rhode Island Democratic State Committee. Before he became a judge, he and his wife were major donors to Democratic political candidates. McConnell chaired David Cicilline's mayoral campaign from 2003 to 2009, and served four years on Rhode Island's Planned Parenthood branch's board of directors.

=== Federal judicial service ===
On November 17, 2008, McConnell sent U.S. Senators Jack Reed and Sheldon Whitehouse a letter expressing his interest in being nominated for the vacancy on the U.S. District Court for the District of Rhode Island that had been created when Judge Ernest C. Torres assumed senior status. McConnell had previously donated $15,530 to Reed and $12,600 to Whitehouse. Reed and Whitehouse interviewed McConnell in February 2009. In April 2009, McConnell learned that Reed would recommend him to the White House for the nomination.

President Barack Obama nominated McConnell to the seat on March 10, 2010. On June 17, the U.S. Senate Judiciary Committee reported his nomination out of committee by a 13–6 vote. On May 4, 2011, the United States Senate invoked cloture on his nomination by a 63–33 vote and confirmed it by a 50–44 vote. On May 6, he received his commission. McConnell became chief judge on December 1, 2019.

=== Federal spending freeze ===
On January 31, 2025, McConnell issued an injunction against the Donald Trump administration's federal government grant pause. His ruling relied on an opinion by U.S. Supreme Court Justice Brett Kavanaugh from Kavanaugh's time as an appeals court judge. In an additional court order on February 10, McConnell wrote that the Trump administration had "continued to improperly freeze federal funds and refused to resume disbursement of appropriated federal funds". In retaliation, Laura Loomer allegedly doxxed McConnell's daughter Catherine by tweeting screenshots of her LinkedIn profile and highlighting her job in the Department of Education and related financial disclosures. Loomer asserted that the judge's daughter's employment constituted a conflict of interest for him. Elon Musk quote-tweeted Loomer's tweet.

== Personal life ==
McConnell is married to Sara, the daughter of former Rhode Island Supreme Court Justice Donald F. Shea, for whom he had clerked. Their daughter Catherine previously worked for the U.S. Department of Education.

== See also ==
- Barack Obama judicial appointment controversies

Legal offices
Preceded by Ernest C. Torres	Judge of the United States District Court for the District of Rhode Island; 2011–present	Incumbent
Preceded by William E. Smith	Chief Judge of the United States District Court for the District of Rhode Island; 2019–present	Incumbent
