= Margaret E. Curran =

American lawyer

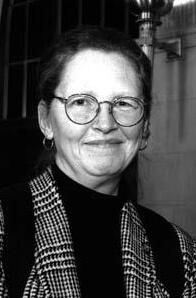
- Curran in 2003

United States Attorney for the District of Rhode Island
- In office 1998–2003
- President: Bill Clinton; George W. Bush
- Preceded by: Sheldon Whitehouse
- Succeeded by: Robert Clark Corrente

Margaret E. "Meg" Curran served as United States Attorney for Rhode Island from 1998 to 2003.

The most notable case during Curran's tenure was the prosecution of the Operation Plunder Dome, which led to the conviction of Providence mayor Buddy Cianci on conspiracy charges. Curran, who was one of only 12 U.S. Attorneys appointed by President Bill Clinton to keep their posts after the election of George W. Bush, stepped down in 2003 because she has multiple sclerosis.

She currently serves as the chair of Rhode Island's Health Benefits Exchange Advisory Board.

== Education ==
Curran earned a bachelor's degree from the University of Pennsylvania, a master's degree in anthropology from Purdue University, and a law degree form the University of Connecticut School of Law in 1983. Curran was an editor of the Connecticut Law Review while earning her degree.

== Affiliations ==
In 1995, Curran became an adjunct professor at the Roger Williams University School of Law. She is a member of the Rhode Island Bar Association.

== Political activities ==
During the 2006 Rhode Island U.S. Senate race, Curran endorsed incumbent Senator Lincoln Chafee over his Democratic challenger and eventual victor Sheldon Whitehouse. While Curran had worked for Whitehouse during his tenure as U.S. Attorney, Chafee fought for Curran to keep her job after Bush's election in 2000. Despite the fact that Curran endorsed Chafee, she refused to criticize Whitehouse.

Curran endorsed Chafee in the 2010 Rhode Island gubernatorial election.

Preceded by Sheldon Whitehouse	U.S. Attorney for Rhode Island; 1998 – 2003	Succeeded by Robert Clark Corrente
