= 1964 United States Senate election in Rhode Island =

- November 3, 1964
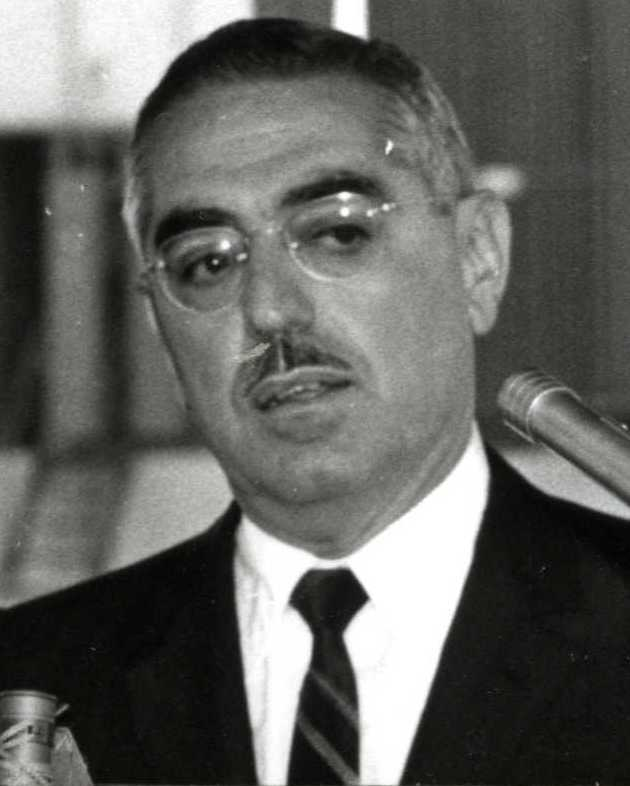

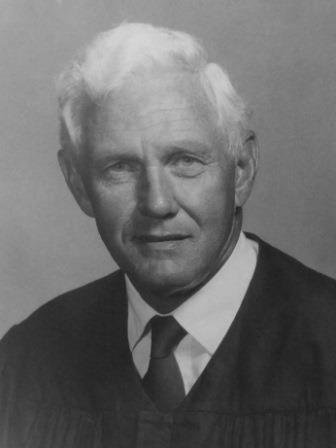
Nominee	John Pastore	Ronald Lagueux
Party	Democratic	Republican
Popular vote	319,607	66,715
Percentage	82.73%	17.27%
- Pastore: 50–60% 60–70% 70–80% 80–90% >90%
U.S. senator before election
John Pastore
Democratic
Elected U.S. Senator
John Pastore
Democratic

The 1964 United States Senate election in Rhode Island took place on November 3, 1964. Incumbent Democratic U.S. Senator John Pastore successfully sought re-election, defeating Republican Ronald Lagueux with 82.73% of the vote.

== Primary elections ==
Primary elections were held on September 17, 1964.

== Democratic primary ==
=== Candidates ===
- John Pastore, incumbent U.S. Senator

=== Results ===
Democratic primary results
Party	Candidate	Votes	%
Democratic	John Pastore (Incumbent)		unopposed

== Republican primary ==
=== Candidates ===
- Ronald Lagueux, attorney

=== Results ===
Republican primary results
Party	Candidate	Votes	%
Republican	Ronald Lagueux		unopposed

== General election ==
=== Results ===
General election results
Party	Candidate	Votes	%
Democratic	John Pastore (Incumbent)	319,607	82.72
Republican	Ronald Lagueux	66,715	17.27
Majority		252,892	65.45
Turnout		386,322	
Democratic hold			

== Bibliography ==
- Congressional Elections, 1946-1996. Washington, D.C.: Congressional Quarterly Inc. 1998. ISBN 1-56802-248-4.
- Scammon, Richard M., ed. (1966). America Votes 6: a handbook of contemporary American election statistics, 1964. Washington, D.C.: Governmental Affairs Institute.
