= United States District Court for the District of Rhode Island =

United States district court

Coordinates: 41.825811°N 71.410454°W

- (D.R.I.)
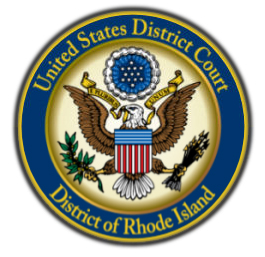

- Location: Federal Building (Providence)
- Appeals to: First Circuit
- Established: June 23, 1790
- Judges: 3
- Chief Judge: John J. McConnell Jr.

Officers of the court
- U.S. Attorney: Sarah M. Bloom (acting)
- U.S. Marshal: Wing Chau
- Official website

The courthouse for the United States District Court for the District of Rhode Island is located in the Federal Building in Providence.

The United States District Court for the District of Rhode Island (in case citations, D.R.I.) is the federal district court whose jurisdiction is the state of Rhode Island. The District Court was created in 1790 when Rhode Island ratified the Constitution. The Federal Courthouse was built in 1908.

Appeals from the District of Rhode Island are taken to the United States Court of Appeals for the First Circuit (except for patent claims and claims against the U.S. government under the Tucker Act, which are appealed to the Federal Circuit).

The United States attorney for the District of Rhode Island represents the United States in civil and criminal litigation in the court. As of December 13, 2021 the United States attorney is Zachary A. Cunha.

== Legislative history ==
The United States District Court for the District of Rhode Island was established on June 23, 1790, by 1 Stat. 128. Congress authorized one judgeship for the Court, and assigned the district to the Eastern Circuit. On February 13, 1801, the outgoing lame duck Federalist-controlled Congress passed the controversial Judiciary Act of 1801 which reassigned the District of Rhode Island to the First Circuit.

The incoming Congress repealed the Judiciary Act of 1801, but in the Judiciary Act of 1802, Congress again assigned the District of Rhode Island to the First Circuit.

A second seat on the Court was created on March 18, 1966, by 80 Stat. 75. A third seat was added on July 10, 1984, by 98 Stat. 333.

== Current judges ==
As of January 21, 2026:

#	Title	Judge	Duty station	Born	Term of service			Appointed by
#	Title	Judge	Duty station	Born	Active	Chief	Senior	Appointed by
23	Chief Judge	John J. McConnell Jr.	Providence	1958	2011–present	2019–present	—	Obama
24	District Judge	Mary S. McElroy	Providence	1965	2019–present	—	—	Trump
25	District Judge	Melissa R. DuBose	Providence	1968	2025–present	—	—	Biden
21	Senior Judge	Mary M. Lisi	inactive	1950	1994–2015	2006–2013	2015–present	Clinton

== Former judges ==
#	Judge	Born–died	Active service	Chief Judge	Senior status	Appointed by	Reason for termination
1	Henry Marchant	1741–1796	1790–1796	—	—	Washington	death
2	Benjamin Bourne	1755–1808	1796–1801 (Note: Recess appointment; formally nominated on December 21, 1796, confirmed by the United States Senate on December 22, 1796, and received commission the same day.)	—	—	Washington	elevation
3	David L. Barnes	1760–1812	1801–1812 (Note: Recess appointment; formally nominated on January 6, 1802, confirmed by the Senate on January 26, 1802, and received commission the same day.)	—	—	Jefferson	death
4	David Howell	1747–1824	1812–1824	—	—	Madison	death
5	John Pitman	1785–1864	1824–1864 (Note: Recess appointment; formally nominated on December 16, 1824, confirmed by the Senate on January 3, 1825, and received commission the same day.)	—	—	Monroe	death
6	J. Russell Bullock	1815–1899	1865–1869	—	—	Lincoln	resignation
7	John Power Knowles	1808–1887	1869–1881 (Note: Recess appointment; formally nominated on December 6, 1869, confirmed by the Senate on January 24, 1870, and received commission the same day.)	—	—	Grant	retirement
8	LeBaron B. Colt	1846–1924	1881–1884	—	—	Garfield	elevation
9	George Carpenter Jr.	1844–1896	1884–1896	—	—	Arthur	death
10	Arthur Lewis Brown	1854–1928	1896–1927 (Note: Recess appointment; formally nominated on December 8, 1896, confirmed by the Senate on December 15, 1896, and received commission the same day.)	—	—	Cleveland	retirement
11	Ira Lloyd Letts	1889–1947	1927–1935 (Note: Recess appointment; formally nominated on December 6, 1927, confirmed by the Senate on January 4, 1928, and received commission the same day.)	—	—	Coolidge	resignation
12	John Christopher Mahoney	1882–1952	1935–1940	—	—	F. Roosevelt	elevation
13	John Patrick Hartigan	1887–1968	1940–1951	—	—	F. Roosevelt	elevation
14	Edward L. Leahy	1886–1953	1951–1953	—	—	Truman	death
15	Edward William Day	1901–1985	1953–1976 (Note: Recess appointment; formally nominated on January 11, 1954, confirmed by the Senate on February 9, 1954, and received commission the same day.)	1966–1971	1976–1985	Eisenhower	death
16	Raymond James Pettine	1912–2003	1966–1982	1971–1982	1982–2003	L. Johnson	death
17	Francis J. Boyle	1927–2006	1977–1992	1982–1992	1992–2006	Carter	death
18	Bruce M. Selya	1934–2025	1982–1986	—	—	Reagan	elevation
19	Ronald Rene Lagueux	1931–2023	1986–2001	1992–1999	2001–2023	Reagan	death
20	Ernest C. Torres	1941–present	1987–2006	1999–2006	2006–2011	Reagan	retirement
22	William E. Smith	1959–present	2002–2025	2013–2019	2025–2026	G.W. Bush	retirement

== Chief judges ==
Chief Judge
Day	1966–1971
Pettine	1971–1982
Boyle	1982–1992
Lagueux	1992–1999
Torres	1999–2006
Lisi	2006–2013
Smith	2013–2019
McConnell	2019–present

Chief judges have administrative responsibilities with respect to their district court. Unlike the Supreme Court, where one justice is specifically nominated to be chief, the office of chief judge rotates among the district court judges. To be chief, a judge must have been in active service on the court for at least one year, be under the age of 65, and have not previously served as chief judge.

A vacancy is filled by the judge highest in seniority among the group of qualified judges. The chief judge serves for a term of seven years, or until age 70, whichever occurs first. The age restrictions are waived if no members of the court would otherwise be qualified for the position.

When the office was created in 1948, the chief judge was the longest-serving judge who had not elected to retire, on what has since 1958 been known as senior status, or declined to serve as chief judge. After August 6, 1959, judges could not become or remain chief after turning 70 years old. The current rules have been in operation since October 1, 1982.

== Succession of seats ==
Seat 1
Seat established on June 23, 1790 by 1 Stat. 128
Marchant	1790–1796
Bourne	1796–1801
Barnes	1801–1812
Howell	1812–1824
Pitman	1824–1864
Bullock	1865–1869
Knowles	1869–1881
Colt	1881–1884
Carpenter, Jr.	1884–1896
Brown	1896–1927
Letts	1927–1935
Mahoney	1935–1940
Hartigan	1940–1951
Leahy	1951–1953
Day	1953–1976
Boyle	1977–1992
Lisi	1994–2015
McElroy	2019–present

Seat 2
Seat established on March 18, 1966 by 80 Stat. 75
Pettine	1966–1982
Selya	1982–1986
Torres	1987–2006
McConnell, Jr.	2011–present

Seat 3
Seat established on July 10, 1984 by 98 Stat. 333
Lagueux	1986–2001
Smith	2002–2025
DuBose	2025–present

== Notable cases ==
- West v. Barnes (1791), the first case appealed to the U.S. Supreme Court
- Fricke v. Lynch (1980), case involving government gender limits on prom dates
- Lee v. Weisman (1992), case involving clergy-led prayer at public school graduation ceremonies

== United States attorneys for the District of Rhode Island ==
Some of the U.S. attorneys for Rhode Island

- David L. Barnes (1797–1801)
- Asher Robbins (1812–1820)
- Dutee J. Pearce (1824–1825)
- George H. Browne (1852–1861)
- Wingate Hayes (1861–1871)
- Nathan F. Dixon III (1877–1885)
- Walter R. Stiness (1911–1914)
- Norman S. Case (1921–1926)
- John S. Murdock (1926–1929)
- Henry Boss (1929–1934)
- J. Howard McGrath (1934–1940)
- George Troy (1940–1952)
- Edward McEntee (1952–1953)
- Raymond James Pettine (1961–1966)
- Edward P. Gallogly (1967–1969)
- Lincoln Almond (1969–1978)
- Paul F. Murray (1978–1981)
- Lincoln Almond (1981–1993)
- Sheldon Whitehouse (1993–1998)
- Margaret E. Curran (1998–2003)
- Robert Clark Corrente (2004–2009)
- Peter Neronha (2009–2017)
- Aaron L. Weisman (2019–2021)
- Richard B. Myrus (acting) (2021–present)

== See also ==
- Courts of Rhode Island
- List of current United States district judges
- List of United States federal courthouses in Rhode Island
