= Ronald Rene Lagueux =

American judge (1931–2023)

Ronald Lagueux
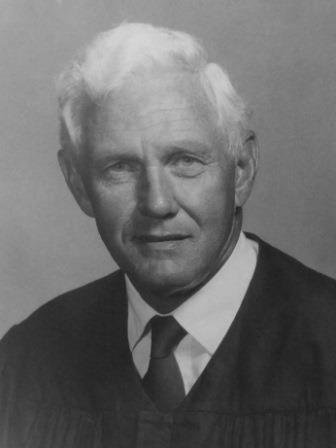
- Lagueux in c. 2000

Senior Judge of the United States District Court for the District of Rhode Island
- In office November 30, 2001 – May 3, 2023

Chief Judge of the United States District Court for the District of Rhode Island
- In office 1992–1999
- Preceded by: Francis Joseph Boyle
- Succeeded by: Ernest C. Torres

Judge of the United States District Court for the District of Rhode Island
- In office March 4, 1986 – November 30, 2001
- Appointed by: Ronald Reagan
- Preceded by: Seat established by 98 Stat. 333
- Succeeded by: William E. Smith

Personal details
- Born: Ronald Rene Lagueux; June 30, 1931 Lewiston, Maine, U.S.
- Died: May 3, 2023 (aged 91)
- Education: Bowdoin College (A.B.); Harvard Law School (LL.B.)

Ronald Rene Lagueux (June 30, 1931 – May 3, 2023) was a United States district judge of the United States District Court for the District of Rhode Island.

== Education and career ==
Born in Lewiston, Maine, Lagueux received an Artium Baccalaureus degree from Bowdoin College in 1953 and a Bachelor of Laws from Harvard Law School in 1956. He was in private practice in Providence, Rhode Island from 1956 until 1968. He was an associate justice of the Rhode Island Supreme Court from 1968 to 1986.

== Federal judicial service ==
On January 21, 1986, Lagueux was nominated by President Ronald Reagan to a new seat on the United States District Court for the District of Rhode Island created by 98 Stat. 333. Lagueux was confirmed by the United States Senate on March 3, 1986, and received his commission on March 4, 1986. He served as Chief Judge from 1992 to 1999. He assumed senior status on November 30, 2001.

== Personal life and death ==
Lagueux died on May 3, 2023, at the age of 91.

== Sources ==
Party political offices
Preceded by Bayard Ewing	Republican nominee for U.S. Senator from Rhode Island (Class 1); 1964	Succeeded by John McLaughlin
Legal offices
Preceded by Seat established by 98 Stat. 333	Judge of the United States District Court for the District of Rhode Island; 1986–2001	Succeeded by William E. Smith
Preceded by Francis Joseph Boyle	Chief Judge of the United States District Court for the District of Rhode Island; 1992–1999	Succeeded by Ernest C. Torres
