= Mary S. McElroy =

American judge (born 1965)

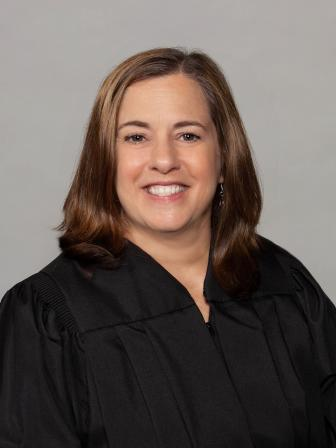

Judge of the United States District Court for the District of Rhode Island
- Incumbent
- Assumed office September 30, 2019
- Appointed by: Donald Trump
- Preceded by: Mary M. Lisi

Personal details
- Born: 1965 (age 60–61) Providence, Rhode Island, U.S.
- Party: Democratic
- Education: Providence College (BA); Suffolk University (JD)

Mary Susan McElroy (born 1965) is a United States district judge of the United States District Court for the District of Rhode Island.

== Education ==
McElroy received a Bachelor of Arts degree in 1987 from Providence College. She received a Juris Doctor in 1992 from Suffolk University Law School.

== Legal career ==
She began her legal career by serving as a law clerk to Justice Donald F. Shea of the Rhode Island Supreme Court, from 1992 to 1993. From 1993 to 1994, she was an associate at the law firm of Tate and Elias LLC in Providence, Rhode Island. From 1994 to 2006, she served as an Assistant Rhode Island Public Defender for the Rhode Island Public Defender's Office. From 2006 to 2012, she served as an Assistant Federal Public Defender for the Districts of Massachusetts, New Hampshire and Rhode Island. From 2012 to 2019, she served as the Public Defender for the Rhode Island Public Defender's Office.

== Federal judicial service ==
=== Expired nomination to district court under Obama ===
On September 8, 2015, President Barack Obama nominated McElroy to serve as a United States District Judge of the United States District Court for the District of Rhode Island, to the seat vacated by Judge Mary M. Lisi, who assumed senior status on October 1, 2015. She received a hearing before the Senate Judiciary Committee on December 9, 2015. On January 28, 2016, her nomination was reported out of committee by voice vote. Her nomination expired on January 3, 2017, with the end of the 114th Congress.

=== Renomination to district court under Trump ===
On April 10, 2018, President Donald Trump announced his intent to nominate McElroy to serve as a United States District Judge of the United States District Court for the District of Rhode Island. She was renominated to the same seat. On April 12, 2018, her nomination was sent to the Senate. On October 11, 2018, her nomination was reported out of committee by a 19–2 vote.

On January 3, 2019, her nomination was returned to the President under Rule XXXI, Paragraph 6 of the United States Senate. On April 8, 2019, President Trump announced the renomination of McElroy to the district court. On May 21, 2019, her nomination was sent to the Senate. On June 20, 2019, her nomination was reported out of committee by a 19–3 vote, with Senators Mike Lee, Josh Hawley, and John Kennedy voting “no”. On September 11, 2019, the Senate confirmed her nomination by a voice vote. She received her judicial commission on September 30, 2019. She joined the court on October 9, 2019.

==== Notable rulings ====
In 2020, McElroy approved of a consent decree between voting rights groups and the State of Rhode Island, which agreed to remove the witness requirement in order to vote by mail. On August 13, 2020, the U.S. Supreme Court affirmed McElroy's decision, although Thomas, Alito, and Gorsuch noted their votes to reverse.

== See also ==
- Barack Obama judicial appointment controversies

Legal offices
Preceded by Mary M. Lisi	Judge of the United States District Court for the District of Rhode Island; 2019–present	Incumbent
