= Raymond James Pettine =

American judge

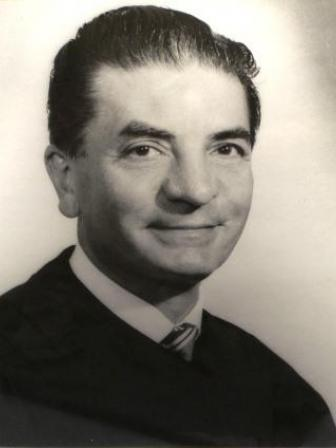

Senior Judge of the United States District Court for the District of Rhode Island
- In office July 6, 1982 – November 17, 2003

Chief Judge of the United States District Court for the District of Rhode Island
- In office 1971–1982
- Preceded by: Edward William Day
- Succeeded by: Francis Joseph Boyle

Judge of the United States District Court for the District of Rhode Island
- In office June 29, 1966 – July 6, 1982
- Appointed by: Lyndon B. Johnson
- Preceded by: Seat established by 80 Stat. 75
- Succeeded by: Bruce M. Selya

Personal details
- Born: Raymond James Pettine; July 6, 1912 Providence, Rhode Island
- Died: November 17, 2003 (aged 91) Dallas, Texas
- Education: Boston University (LLB, LLM)

Raymond James Pettine (July 6, 1912 – November 17, 2003) was a United States district judge of the United States District Court for the District of Rhode Island.

== Education and career ==
Born in Providence, Rhode Island, Pettine received a Bachelor of Laws from Boston University School of Law in 1937 and a Master of Laws from the same institution in 1940. He was in the United States Army during World War II, from 1941 to 1946, thereafter remaining in the United States Army Reserve until 1966, achieving the rank of colonel in the Judge Advocate General's Corps. He was in private practice in Providence from 1946 to 1961. He was special counsel to the State Attorney General of Rhode Island from 1948 to 1952. He was an assistant state attorney general of Rhode Island from 1952 to 1961. He was the United States Attorney for the District of Rhode Island from 1961 to 1966.

== Federal judicial service ==
On June 13, 1966, Pettine was nominated by President Lyndon B. Johnson to a new seat on the United States District Court for the District of Rhode Island created by 80 Stat. 75. He was confirmed by the United States Senate on June 29, 1966, and received his commission the same day. He served as Chief Judge from 1971 to 1982, assuming senior status on July 6, 1982. Pettine served in that capacity until his death on November 17, 2003, in Dallas, Texas.

== Sources ==
Legal offices
Preceded by Seat established by 80 Stat. 75	Judge of the United States District Court for the District of Rhode Island; 1966–1982	Succeeded by Bruce M. Selya
Preceded by Edward William Day	Chief Judge of the United States District Court for the District of Rhode Island; 1971–1982	Succeeded by Francis Joseph Boyle
