= Mary M. Lisi =

American judge (born 1950)

Mary Mona Lisi
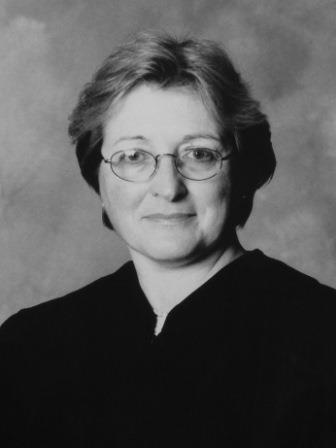

Senior Judge of the United States District Court for the District of Rhode Island
- Incumbent
- Assumed office October 1, 2015

Chief Judge of the United States District Court for the District of Rhode Island
- In office 2006–2013
- Preceded by: Ernest C. Torres
- Succeeded by: William E. Smith

Judge of the United States District Court for the District of Rhode Island
- In office May 9, 1994 – October 1, 2015
- Appointed by: Bill Clinton
- Preceded by: Francis J. Boyle
- Succeeded by: Mary S. McElroy

Personal details
- Born: September 4, 1950 (age 75) Providence, Rhode Island, U.S.
- Education: University of Rhode Island (BA); Temple University Beasley School of Law (JD)

Mary Mona Lisi (born September 4, 1950) is an inactive Senior United States district judge of the United States District Court for the District of Rhode Island.

== Early life and education ==
Born in Providence, Rhode Island, Lisi earned a Bachelor of Arts degree in 1972 from the University of Rhode Island and a Juris Doctor in 1977 from Temple University Beasley School of Law.

== Professional career ==
Lisi began her career as an assistant public defender in the Rhode Island Public Defender's Office, where she worked from 1977 until 1981. She then worked as an assistant child advocate for the Office of the Child Advocate for the State of Rhode Island from 1981 until 1982.

Lisi concurrently worked in private legal practice from 1981 until 1982, when she took a job as Director of the Court Appointed Special Advocate Program for the Rhode Island Family Court. She held that job from 1982 until 1987. Lisi then became Deputy Disciplinary Counsel for the Rhode Island Supreme Court from 1988 until 1990 and Chief Disciplinary Counsel for the Rhode Island Supreme Court beginning in 1990. From 1991 to 1992 she was a Member, Select Commission to Investigate the Failure of Rhode Island Share and Deposit Indemnity Corporation. She left her role of Chief Disciplinary Counsel in 1994, when she was tapped for a seat on the federal bench.

== Federal judicial service ==
On the recommendation of United States Senator Claiborne Pell, Lisi was nominated by President Bill Clinton on January 27, 1994, to a seat vacated by Francis Joseph Boyle as Boyle assumed senior status. The United States Senate confirmed Lisi in a voice vote on May 6, 1994. Lisi was chief judge of her court from 2006 to 2013. She assumed senior status on October 1, 2015, and ceased taking cases after July 1, 2017.

== Sources ==
Legal offices
| Preceded by Francis J. Boyle | Judge of the United States District Court for the District of Rhode Island; 1994–2015 | Succeeded by Mary S. McElroy |
| Preceded by Ernest C. Torres | Chief Judge of the United States District Court for the District of Rhode Island; 2006–2013 | Succeeded by William E. Smith |
