= Customhouse Historic District =

Historic district in Rhode Island, United States

- U.S. National Register of Historic Places
- U.S. Historic district
- U.S. Historic district – Contributing property
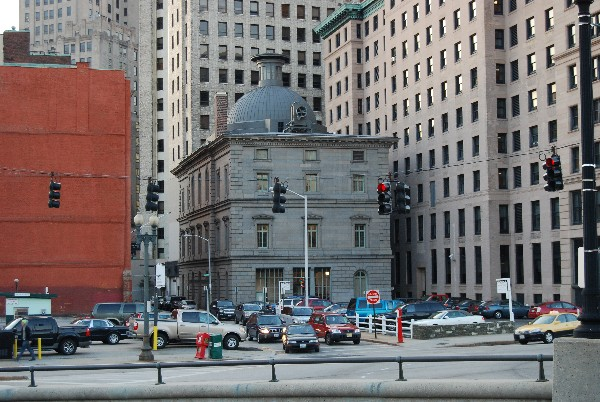
- Customhouse, Providence

- Location within Rhode Island Location within the United States
- Location: Providence, Rhode Island
- Coordinates: 41°49′27″N 71°24′35″W
- Architect: Multiple
- Architectural style: Late Victorian
- Part of: Downtown Providence Historic District (ID84001967)
- NRHP reference No.: 75000058

Significant dates
- Added to NRHP: February 20, 1975
- Designated CP: February 10, 1984

The Customhouse Historic District is a historic district encompassing fifteen historic buildings in downtown Providence, Rhode Island. The district is bounded by Westminster, Exchange, Dyer, Pine, and Peck Streets, and includes eight buildings associated with the important functions of the business center Providence became in the mid-to-late 19th century. It was listed on the National Register of Historic Places in 1975, and is completely contained within the Downtown Providence Historic District, listed in 1984.

The district is centered on the United States Customshouse, a three-story granite structure built in 1857 to a design by Ammi B. Young; it was listed on the National Register in 1972. Seven buildings in its immediate vicinity were built between about 1850 and 1920, which housed businesses critical for the functioning of Rhode Island's growing industrial economy. Notable among these is the 1855 Bank of North America Building, a narrow four-story brownstone designed by locally prominent architect Thomas Tefft. The oldest building in the district, now known as the Westminster Arcade, was designed by Russell Warren and built in 1828. Notable for its Greek temple front, it was declared a National Historic Landmark in 1976, and was the nation's first enclosed shopping mall. The Equitable Building, built in 1872, is one of the first buildings in the city to feature a cast iron facade.

== Notable structures ==
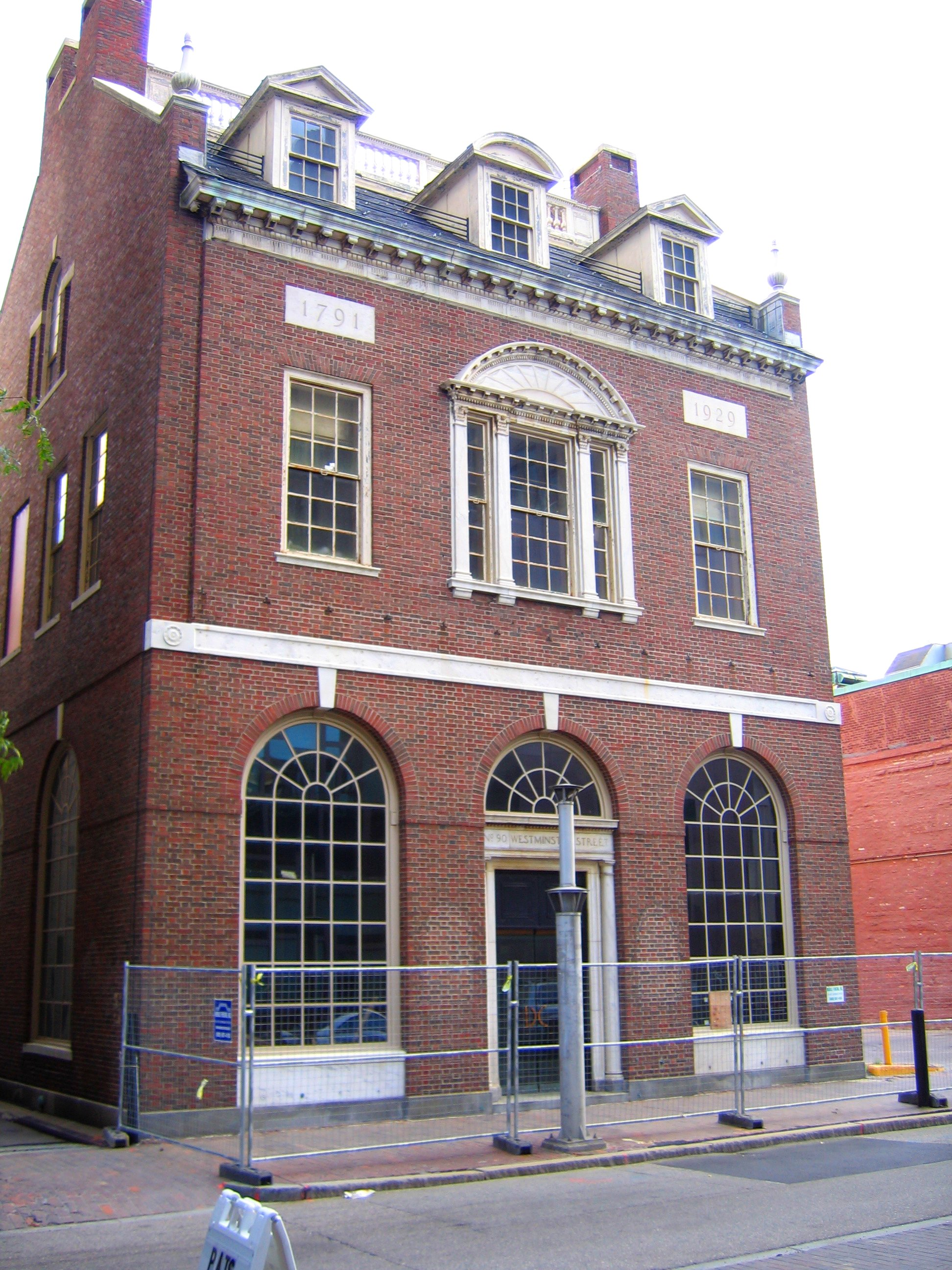
The Westminster St. portion of the Neo-Georgian Providence National Bank building was demolished in 2005.

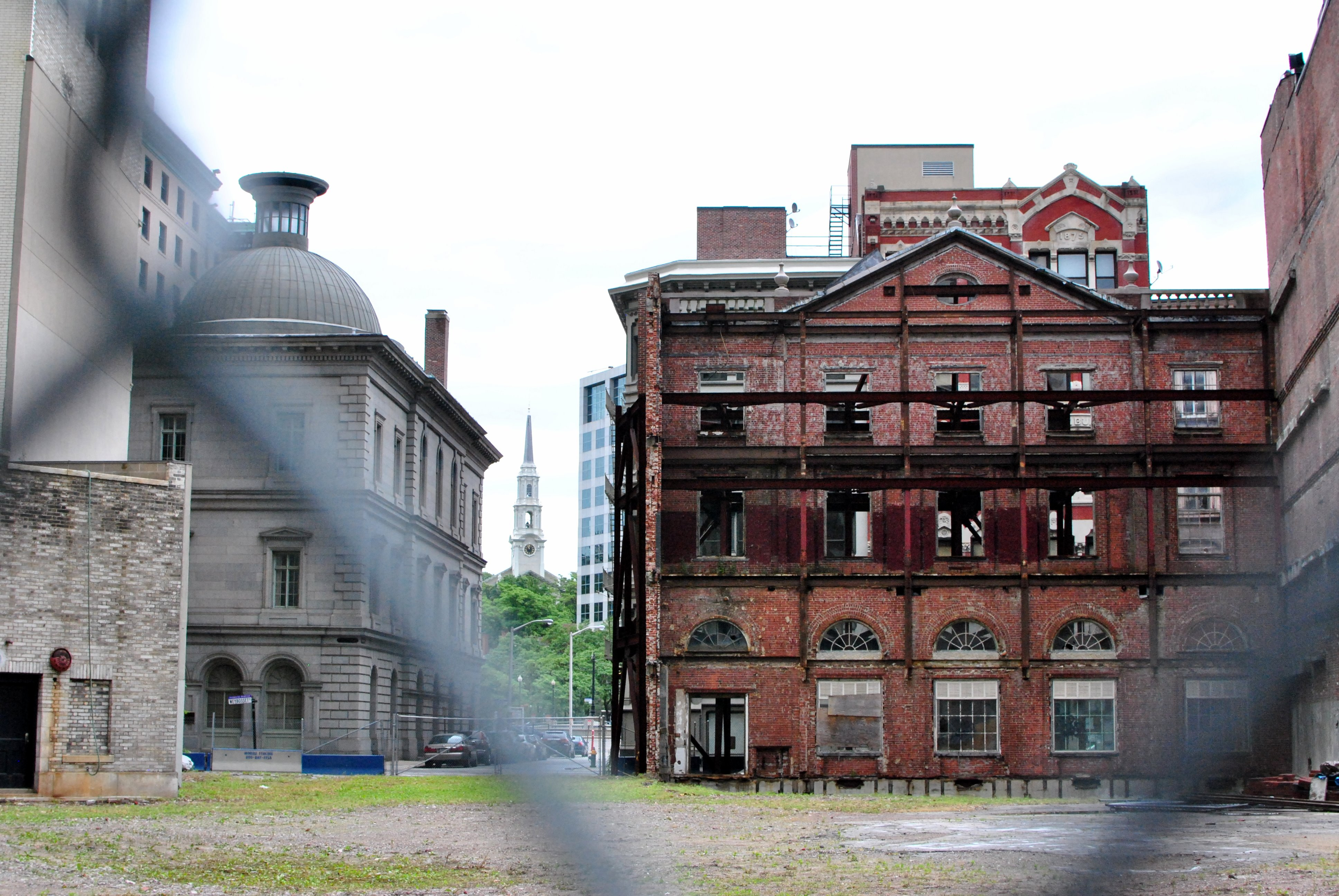
The extant facade of the Providence National Bank building facing Weybosset St.

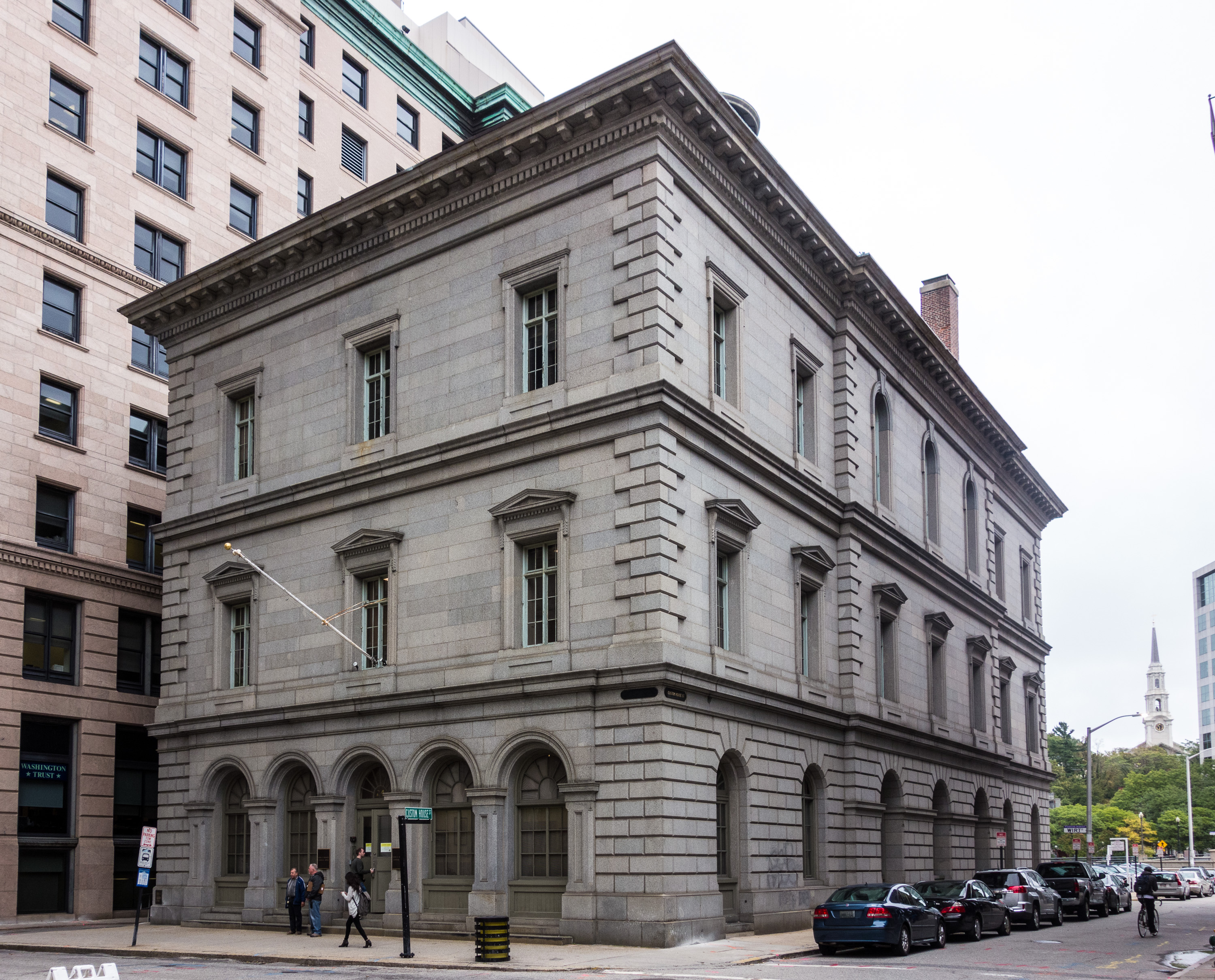
The United States Customshouse is independently listed on the NRHP

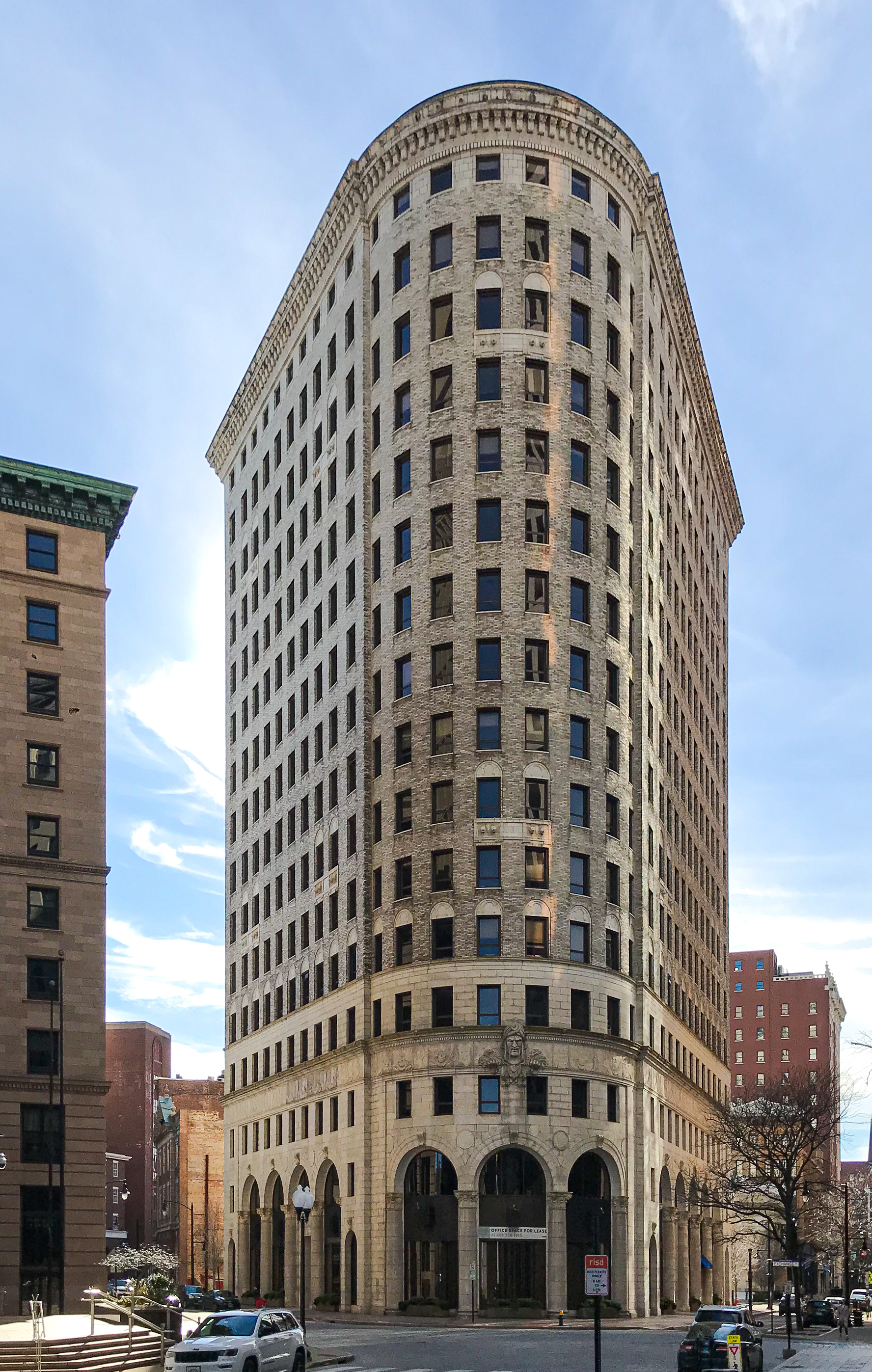
The 215 ft. tall Turk's Head Building, completed in 1913

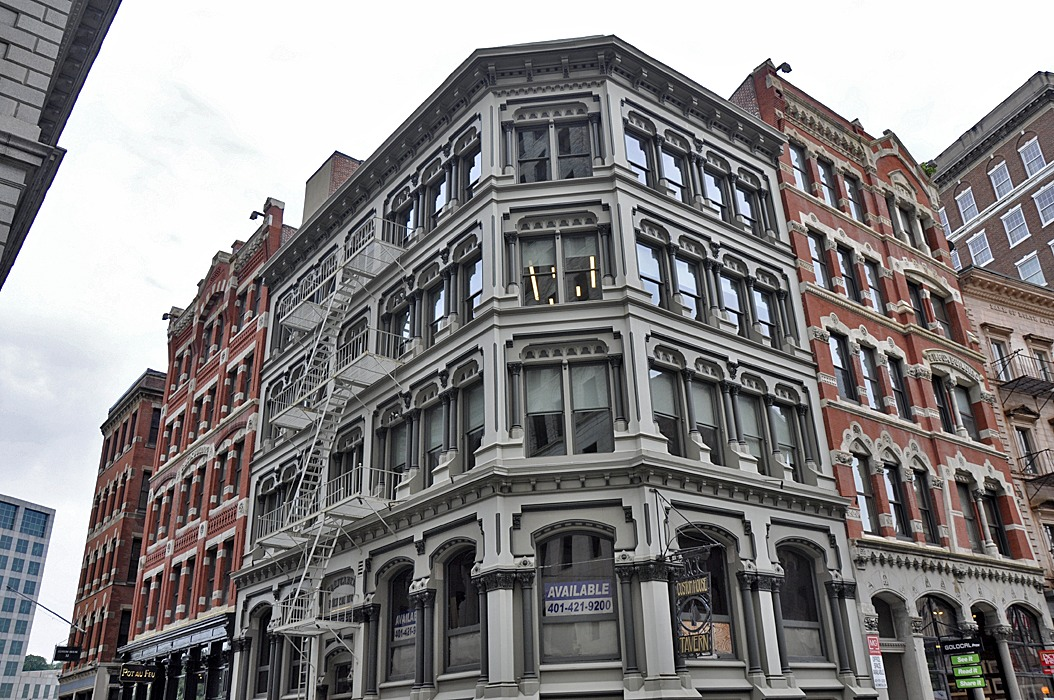
The 1872 Equitable Buildings represents one of the earliest uses of a cast iron facade in the city

== See also ==
- National Register of Historic Places listings in Providence, Rhode Island
