= Robert Clark Corrente =

American lawyer

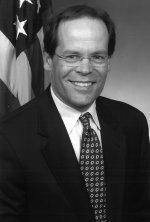
Robert Clark Corrente

Robert Clark Corrente (born in North Providence, Rhode Island) was the United States Attorney for the state of Rhode Island.

== Early career ==
Corrente graduated from Dartmouth College in 1978 with highest distinction and graduated from New York University School of Law in 1981. After graduating from law school, Corrente served as a managing partner at Corrente, Brill & Kusinitz. In 1998, he became a partner at Hinckley, Allen & Snyder, LLP, which has offices in Providence, Boston, and New Hampshire. During this time, Corrente also served on the Rhode Island Supreme Court's Ethics Advisory Panel, the Rhode Island Judicial Nominating Commission, and the Editorial Board of Rhode Island Lawyers' Weekly.

== U.S. Attorney for Rhode Island ==
In May 2004, Corrente was nominated by President George W. Bush to fill the United States Attorney position left vacant by Margaret E. Curran the year before. He was confirmed by the United States Senate two months later.

A year before Corrente took office, allegation emerged that Rhode Island State Senator John Celona had accepted money and gifts from CVS, Blue Cross & Blue Shield of Rhode Island, and Roger Williams Hospital. Corrente inherited this investigation, and in June 2005 filed charges against Celona claiming that he defrauded the state's citizens by accepting money and gifts from the aforementioned companies, which had interests in legislation Celona considered as chairman of the Senate Corporations Committee. Celona agreed to cooperate with investigators. Celona was sentenced to 2 1/2 years in prison in the beginning of 2007.

Celona's cooperation with authorities led to a number of investigations into corruption, including within Rhode Island's state government and several corporations based in Rhode Island. In fact, Corrente announced that the office was pursuing 14 active investigations of seven politicians and seven corporations for corruption schemes similar to that of the Celona case. The investigation was dubbed "Operation Dollar Bill", and Corrente described it as a case even more significant than Operation Plunder Dome, an investigation that resulted in the conviction of sitting-Providence Mayor Vincent "Buddy" Cianci. The Providence Journal wrote that the investigation reached as far as the offices of Rhode Island Senate president Joseph A. Montalbano and Senate Finance chairman Stephen D. Alves, the towns of West Warwick and Lincoln, and former Senate President William V. Irons. Former Roger Williams Hospital president Robert A. Urciuoli and vice president Frances P. Driscoll were co-defendants in the case against Celona, and were both convicted on various charges related to the hospital's payments to Celona. Following an appeal and a new trial, Urciuoli was again convicted but Frances Driscoll was acquitted of all charges. CVS executives Carlos Ortiz and John R. Kramer were indicted in January 2007 for allegedly bribing Celona. Both were acquitted, however, in 2008, effectively ending "Operation Dollar Bill".

Corrente resigned as U. S. Attorney on June 26, 2009, and joined the private law firm Burns & Levinson. Before he left office, Republican Senator Lincoln Chafee said he recommended Corrente for an open position on the bench of the United States District Court for the District of Rhode Island.

== Notes and references ==
Preceded by Margaret E. Curran	U.S. Attorney for Rhode Island; 2004–2009	Succeeded by Peter F. Neronha
