= Arthur Lewis Brown =

American judge

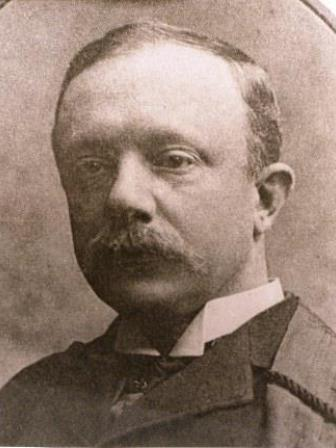

Judge of the United States District Court for the District of Rhode Island
- In office October 15, 1896 – June 30, 1927
- Appointed by: Grover Cleveland
- Preceded by: George Moulton Carpenter Jr.
- Succeeded by: Ira Lloyd Letts

Personal details
- Born: Arthur Lewis Brown; November 28, 1854 Providence, Rhode Island, U.S.
- Died: June 10, 1928 (aged 73) Providence, Rhode Island, U.S.
- Education: Brown University (A.B.); Boston University School of Law (LL.B.)

Arthur Lewis Brown (November 28, 1854 – June 10, 1928) was a United States district judge of the United States District Court for the District of Rhode Island.

== Education and career ==
Born in Providence, Rhode Island, Brown received an Artium Baccalaureus degree from Brown University in 1876 and a Bachelor of Laws from Boston University School of Law in 1878. He was in private practice in Providence from 1878 to 1895.

== Federal judicial service ==
Brown received a recess appointment from President Grover Cleveland on October 15, 1896, to a seat on the United States District Court for the District of Rhode Island vacated by Judge George Moulton Carpenter Jr. He was nominated to the same position by President Cleveland on December 8, 1896. He was confirmed by the United States Senate on December 15, 1896, and received his commission the same day. His service terminated on June 30, 1927, due to his retirement.

== Death ==
Brown died on June 10, 1928, in Providence.

== See also ==
- List of United States federal judges by longevity of service

== Sources ==
Legal offices
Preceded by George Moulton Carpenter Jr.	Judge of the United States District Court for the District of Rhode Island; 1896–1927	Succeeded by Ira Lloyd Letts
