= Edward William Day =

American judge

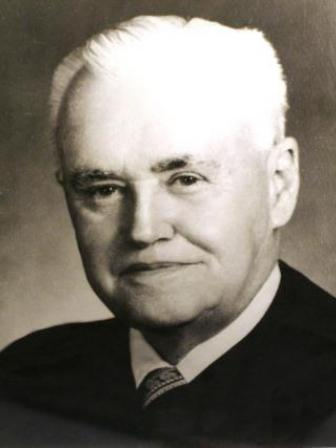

Senior Judge of the United States District Court for the District of Rhode Island
- In office March 19, 1976 – October 22, 1985

Chief Judge of the United States District Court for the District of Rhode Island
- In office 1966–1971
- Preceded by: Office established
- Succeeded by: Raymond James Pettine

Judge of the United States District Court for the District of Rhode Island
- In office November 10, 1953 – March 19, 1976
- Appointed by: Dwight D. Eisenhower
- Preceded by: Edward L. Leahy
- Succeeded by: Francis J. Boyle

Personal details
- Born: Edward William Day; May 24, 1901 Cranston, Rhode Island
- Died: October 22, 1985 (aged 84)
- Education: Brown University (Ph.B.); Harvard Law School (LL.B.)

Edward William Day (May 24, 1901 – October 22, 1985) was a United States district judge of the United States District Court for the District of Rhode Island.

== Education and career ==
Born in Cranston, Rhode Island, Day received a Bachelor of Philosophy degree from Brown University in 1922 and a Bachelor of Laws from Harvard Law School in 1925. He was in private practice in Providence, Rhode Island from 1925 to 1930, and was a law clerk for the Eighth District Court of Rhode Island from 1929 to 1930. He was first assistant state attorney general of Rhode Island from 1930 to 1933, and was city solicitor for Cranston from 1935 to 1943. He was Chairman of the Rhode Island Civil Service Commission from 1939 to 1941.

== Federal judicial service ==
On November 10, 1953, Day received a recess appointment from President Dwight D. Eisenhower to a seat on the United States District Court for the District of Rhode Island vacated by Judge Edward L. Leahy. Formally nominated to the same seat by President Eisenhower on January 11, 1954, Day was confirmed by the United States Senate on February 9, 1954, and received his commission the same day. He served as Chief Judge from 1966 to 1971, and assumed senior status on March 19, 1976, serving in that capacity until his death on October 22, 1985.

== Sources ==
Legal offices
Preceded by Edward L. Leahy	Judge of the United States District Court for the District of Rhode Island; 1953–1976	Succeeded by Francis J. Boyle
Preceded by Office established	Chief Judge of the United States District Court for the District of Rhode Island; 1966–1971	Succeeded by Raymond James Pettine
