= John Patrick Hartigan =

American judge (1887–1968)

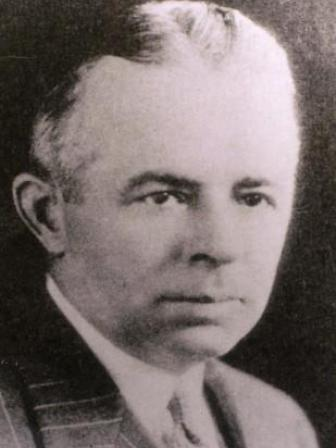

Senior Judge of the United States Court of Appeals for the First Circuit
- In office March 31, 1965 – August 10, 1968

Judge of the United States Court of Appeals for the First Circuit
- In office January 3, 1951 – March 31, 1965
- Appointed by: Harry S. Truman
- Preceded by: John Christopher Mahoney
- Succeeded by: Frank M. Coffin

Judge of the United States District Court for the District of Rhode Island
- In office February 12, 1940 – January 13, 1951
- Appointed by: Franklin D. Roosevelt
- Preceded by: John Christopher Mahoney
- Succeeded by: Edward L. Leahy

59th Attorney General of Rhode Island
- In office 1933–1939
- Governor: Theodore F. Green; Robert E. Quinn
- Preceded by: Benjamin M. McLyman
- Succeeded by: Louis V. Jackvony

Personal details
- Born: December 29, 1887 Providence, Rhode Island
- Died: August 10, 1968 (aged 80)
- Education: Harvard University; Brown University (AB); Columbia University (AM); Columbia Law School (LLB)

John Patrick Hartigan (December 29, 1887 – August 10, 1968) was Attorney General of Rhode Island, a United States district judge of the United States District Court for the District of Rhode Island and a United States Circuit Judge of the United States Court of Appeals for the First Circuit.

== Education and career ==
Born in Providence, Rhode Island, Hartigan attended Harvard University, then received an Artium Baccalaureus degree from Brown University in 1910. He received an Artium Magister degree from Columbia University in 1913 and received a Bachelor of Laws from Columbia Law School the same year. He was in private practice of law in Providence from 1912 to 1933. He was in the United States Army as a Second Lieutenant during World War I from 1917 to 1918 in the 304th Infantry Regiment. He was an Assistant Attorney General of Rhode Island from 1923 to 1924 and served as the 59th Attorney General of Rhode Island from 1933 to 1939.

== Federal judicial service ==
Hartigan was nominated by President Franklin D. Roosevelt on January 11, 1940, to a seat on the United States District Court for the District of Rhode Island vacated by Judge John Christopher Mahoney. He was confirmed by the United States Senate on February 1, 1940, and received his commission on February 12, 1940. His service was terminated on January 13, 1951, due to his elevation to the First Circuit.

Hartigan was nominated by President Harry S. Truman on December 21, 1950, to a seat on the United States Court of Appeals for the First Circuit vacated by Judge John Christopher Mahoney. He was confirmed by the Senate on January 2, 1951, and received his commission on January 3, 1951. He assumed senior status on March 31, 1965. His service was terminated on August 10, 1968, due to his death.

Legal offices
Preceded by Benjamin M. McLyman	Attorney General of Rhode Island; 1933–1939	Succeeded by Louis V. Jackvony
Preceded by John Christopher Mahoney	Judge of the United States District Court for the District of Rhode Island; 1940–1951	Succeeded by Edward L. Leahy
Preceded by John Christopher Mahoney	Judge of the United States Court of Appeals for the First Circuit; 1951–1965	Succeeded by Frank M. Coffin
