= Zachary A. Cunha =

American lawyer (born 1976)

Zachary Cunha
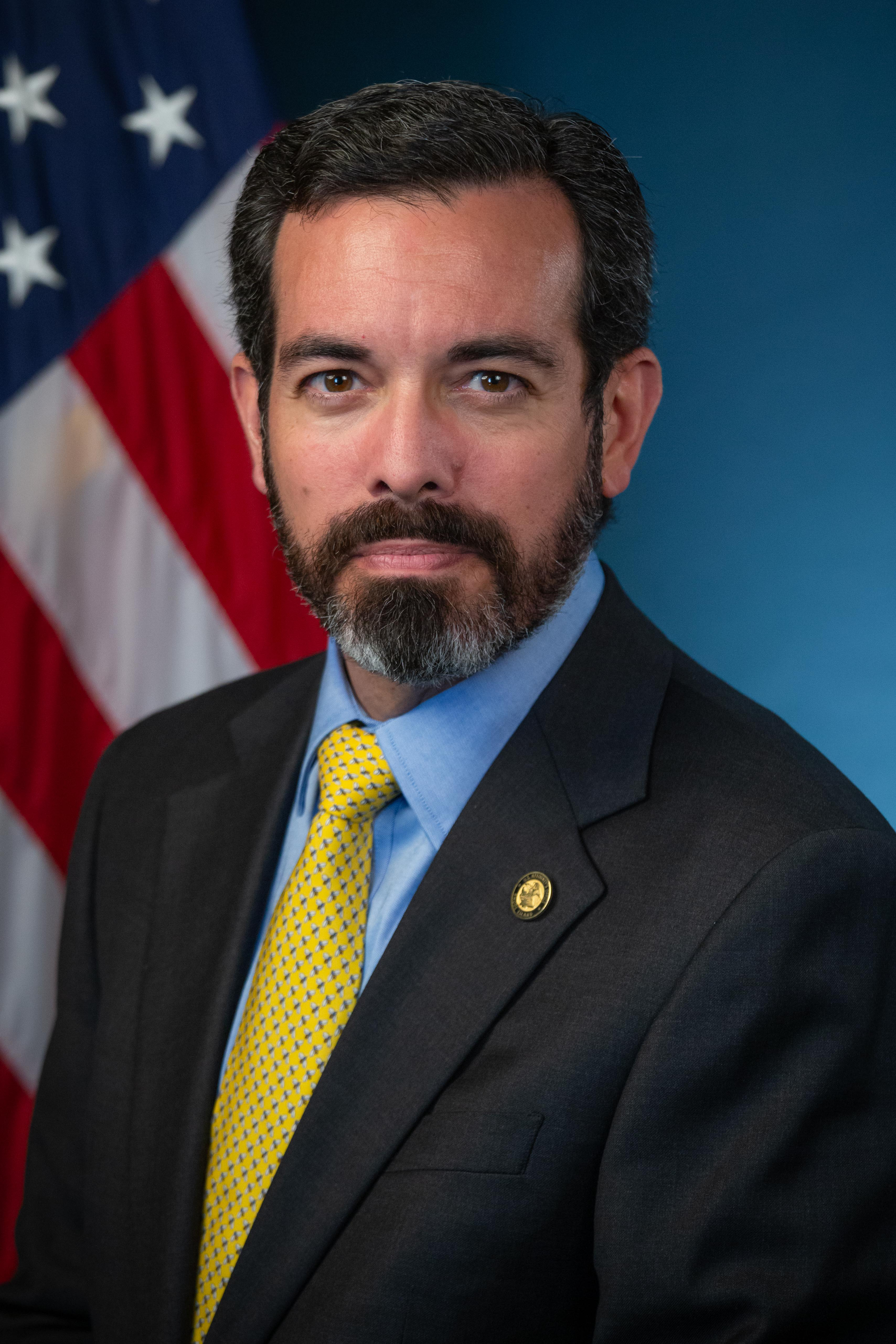

United States Attorney for the District of Rhode Island
- In office December 13, 2021 – February 18, 2025
- President: Joe Biden; Donald Trump
- Preceded by: Richard Myrus (acting)
- Succeeded by: Vacant

Personal details
- Born: Zachary Anthony Cunha; 1976 (age 49–50) Hartford, Connecticut, U.S.
- Party: Democratic
- Education: Brown University (AB); George Washington University (JD)

Zachary Anthony Cunha (born 1976) is an American lawyer who served as the United States attorney for the District of Rhode Island from 2021 until 2025.

== Early life and education ==
Cunha was born in Hartford, Connecticut, and grew up on Long Island, New York. He received his Bachelor of Arts, with honors, from Brown University in 1998 and he received his Juris Doctor, with honors, from the George Washington University Law School in 2001.

== Career ==
Cunha served as an assistant corporation counsel for New York City from 2001 to 2005. From 2005 to 2008, he served as an assistant United States attorney in the Eastern District of New York and in the District of Massachusetts from 2008 to 2013. From 2014 to 2021, he served as an assistant United States attorney in the United States Attorney's office for the District of Rhode Island.

=== U.S. attorney for the District of Rhode Island ===
In May 2021, Senators Jack Reed and Sheldon Whitehouse recommended Cunha be the nominee to serve as U.S. Attorney. On September 28, 2021, President Joe Biden nominated Cunha to be the United States Attorney for the District of Rhode Island. On November 4, 2021, his nomination was reported out of committee by voice vote. Senators Josh Hawley and Marsha Blackburn voted "no" on record. On December 7, 2021, his nomination was confirmed in the United States Senate by voice vote. He was sworn into office on December 13, 2021.

Legal offices
Preceded by Richard Myrus; Acting	United States Attorney for the District of Rhode Island; 2021–2025	Vacant
