= John Christopher Mahoney =

American judge (1882–1952)

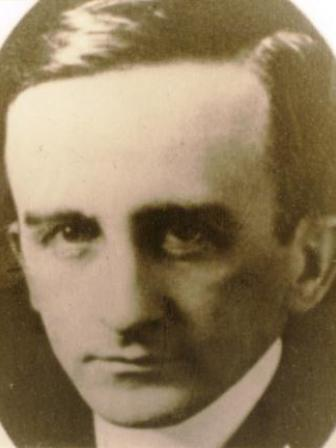

Senior Judge of the United States Court of Appeals for the First Circuit
- In office December 20, 1950 – November 18, 1952

Judge of the United States Court of Appeals for the First Circuit
- In office February 12, 1940 – December 20, 1950
- Appointed by: Franklin D. Roosevelt
- Preceded by: James Madison Morton Jr.
- Succeeded by: John Patrick Hartigan

Judge of the United States District Court for the District of Rhode Island
- In office June 7, 1935 – February 21, 1940
- Appointed by: Franklin D. Roosevelt
- Preceded by: Ira Lloyd Letts
- Succeeded by: John Patrick Hartigan

Personal details
- Born: John Christopher Mahoney; December 19, 1882 Cork, Ireland, United Kingdom
- Died: November 18, 1952 (aged 69)
- Education: Brown University (AB); Harvard Law School (LLB)

John Christopher Mahoney (December 19, 1882 – November 18, 1952) was a United States circuit judge of the United States Court of Appeals for the First Circuit and previously was a United States District Judge of the United States District Court for the District of Rhode Island.

== Education and career ==
Born on December 19, 1882, in Boherbue, Cork, Ireland, Mahoney received an Artium Baccalaureus degree in 1905 from Brown University and a Bachelor of Laws in 1908 from Harvard Law School. He entered private practice in Providence, Rhode Island from 1908 to 1931. He served as an Assistant United States Attorney for the District of Rhode Island from 1917 to 1921. He served as city solicitor for Providence from 1931 to 1935. He was a Knight of Columbus.

== Federal judicial service ==
Mahoney was nominated by President Franklin D. Roosevelt on May 24, 1935, to a seat on the United States District Court for the District of Rhode Island vacated by Judge Ira Lloyd Letts. He was confirmed by the United States Senate on June 4, 1935, and received his commission on June 7, 1935. His service terminated on February 21, 1940, due to his elevation to the First Circuit.

Mahoney was nominated by President Roosevelt on January 11, 1940, to a seat on the United States Court of Appeals for the First Circuit vacated by Judge James Madison Morton Jr. He was confirmed by the Senate on February 7, 1940, and received his commission on February 12, 1940. He assumed senior status due to a certified disability on December 20, 1950. His service terminated on November 18, 1952, due to his death.

== See also ==
Legal offices
Preceded by Ira Lloyd Letts	Judge of the United States District Court for the District of Rhode Island; 1935–1940	Succeeded by John Patrick Hartigan
Preceded by James Madison Morton Jr.	Judge of the United States Court of Appeals for the First Circuit; 1940–1950	Succeeded by John Patrick Hartigan
