= United States Customshouse (Providence, Rhode Island) =

- U.S. Customshouse
- U.S. National Register of Historic Places
- U.S. Historic district – Contributing property
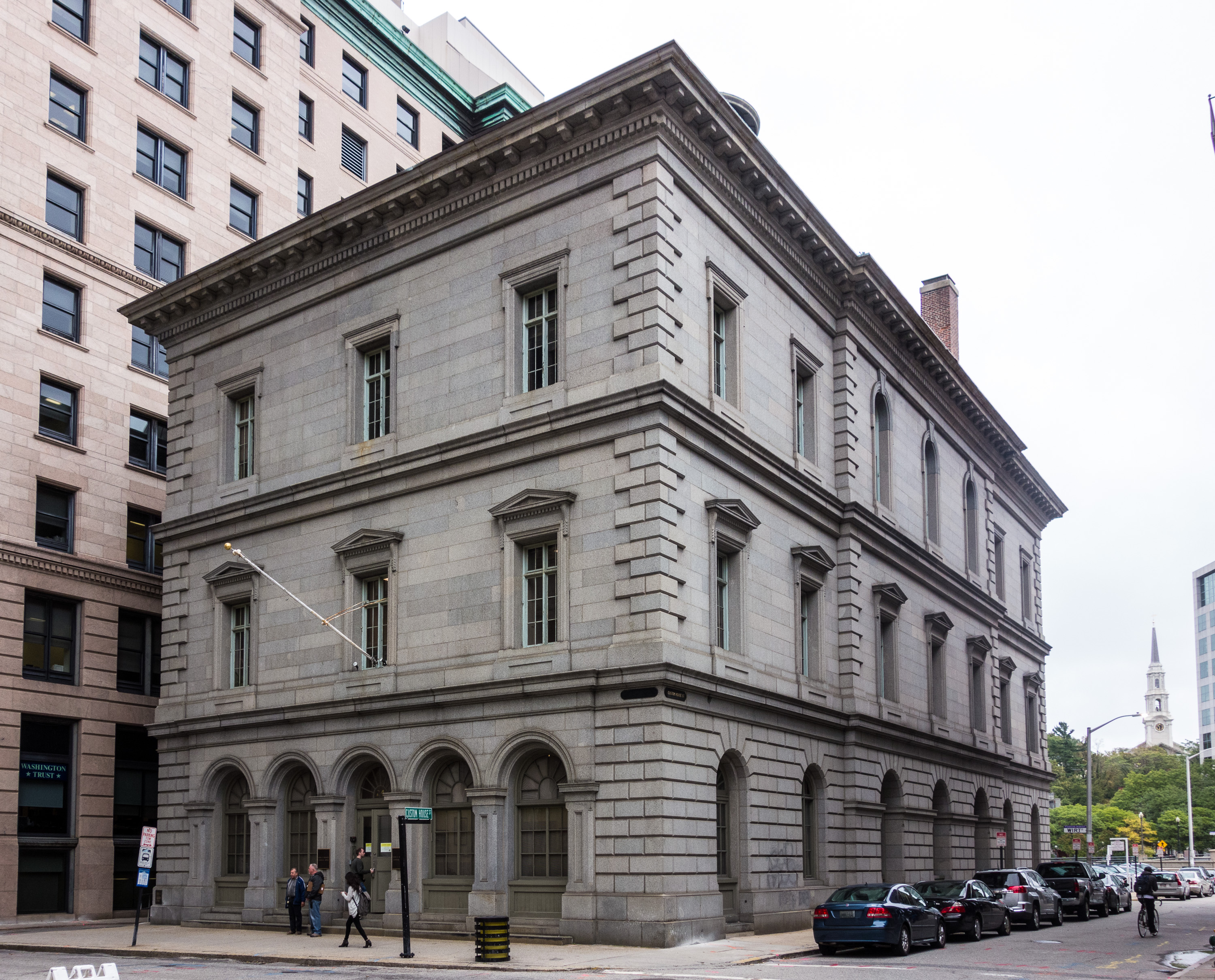

- Location within Rhode Island Location within the United States
- Location: Providence, Rhode Island
- Coordinates: 41°49′28″N 71°24′36″W
- Area: less than one acre
- Built: 1857
- Architect: Ammi B. Young
- Architectural style: Renaissance
- Part of: Customhouse Historic District (ID75000058)
- NRHP reference No.: 72000005

Significant dates
- Added to NRHP: April 13, 1972
- Designated CP: February 20, 1975

The U.S. Customshouse is a historic custom house at 24 Weybosset Street in Providence, Rhode Island at the northeast corner at Weybosset and Custom House streets. The customhouse was built between 1855 and 1857 to a design by Ammi B. Young and added to the National Register of Historic Places in 1972. In 1992, the building was purchased by the State of Rhode Island and converted to office space for the State Courts System. The building was opened by the state of Rhode Island as the John E. Fogarty Judicial Complex after an extensive $550,000 renovation.

== History ==
The building was completed in 1857 at a total cost of construction of $209,723.32. It was constructed of granite from quarries in Quincy, Massachusetts. It is a three-story building, topped by a hip roof and metal dome, with quoined corners and cornices between the levels. It is three bays wide and seven deep, with the central three bays on each side projecting slightly, with further quoining to emphasize the projection.

After completion it housed the city's main post office, Federal District Court, District Attorney, Internal Revenue Service, Collector of Customs, and Steamboat Inspector. The building housed these federal offices until November 1909, when a new and larger Federal Building was erected on Exchange Place (now Kennedy Plaza) nearby. Thereafter, the structure remained vacant until 1921 when the U.S. Customs office and other federal agencies needing additional space returned. The Federal Government occupied the building for the next seventy years. After the Federal Government vacated the structure in 1989, it was considered by a variety of businesses for occupation, including a restaurant, a facility for homeless persons, and offices. The building was bought by the State of Rhode Island and converted to office space for the State Courts System. After extensive renovation at a cost of $550,000, the building was opened by the state in 1992 as the John E. Fogarty Judicial Complex.

The Customshouse is the centerpiece of the Customhouse Historic District, which includes eight commercial buildings historically associated with the growth of the city as a business center in the mid-to-late 19th century. That historic district is a portion of the larger Downtown Providence Historic District, listed in 1984.

== Gallery ==
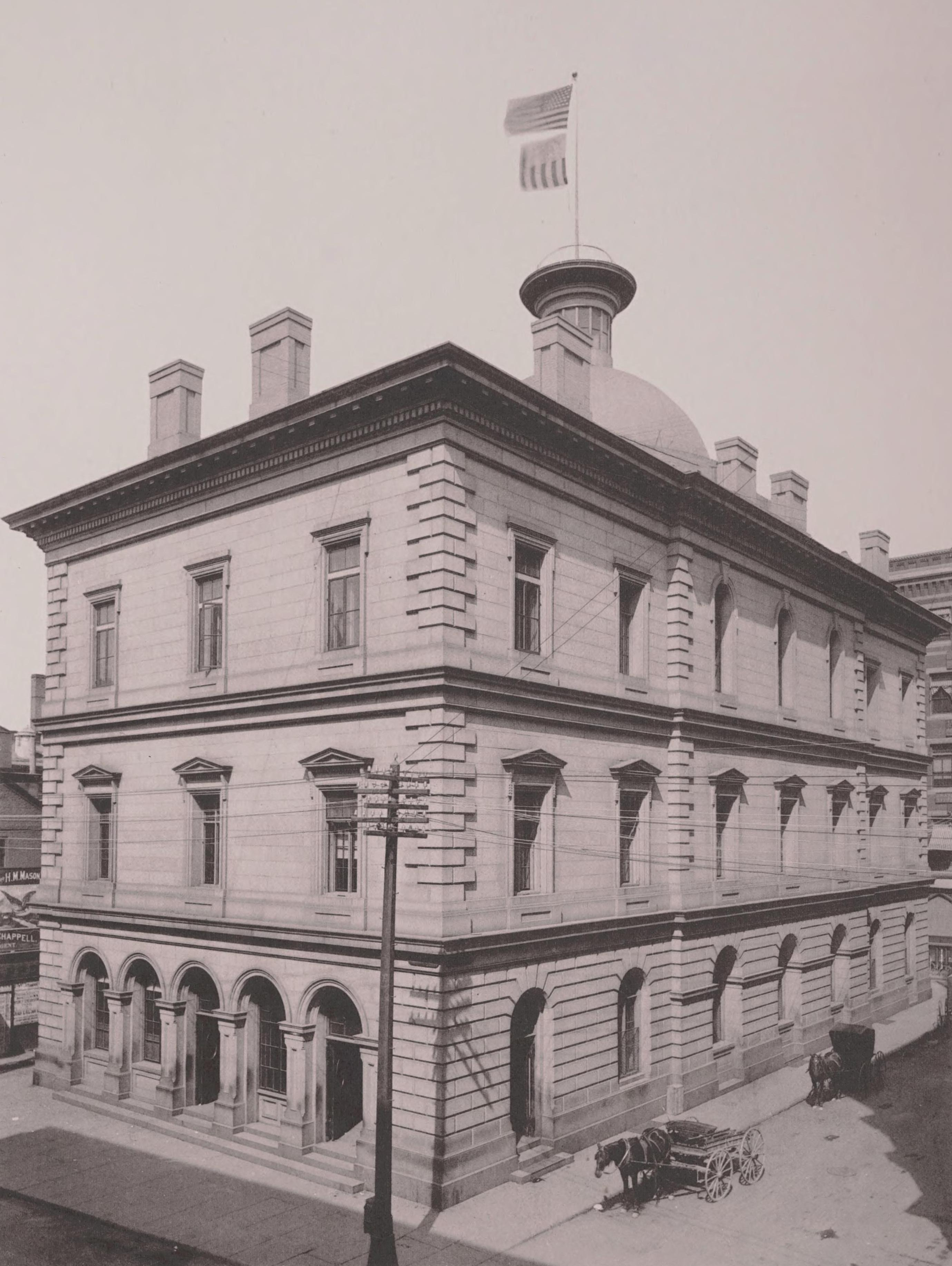
A view of the building published in 1891

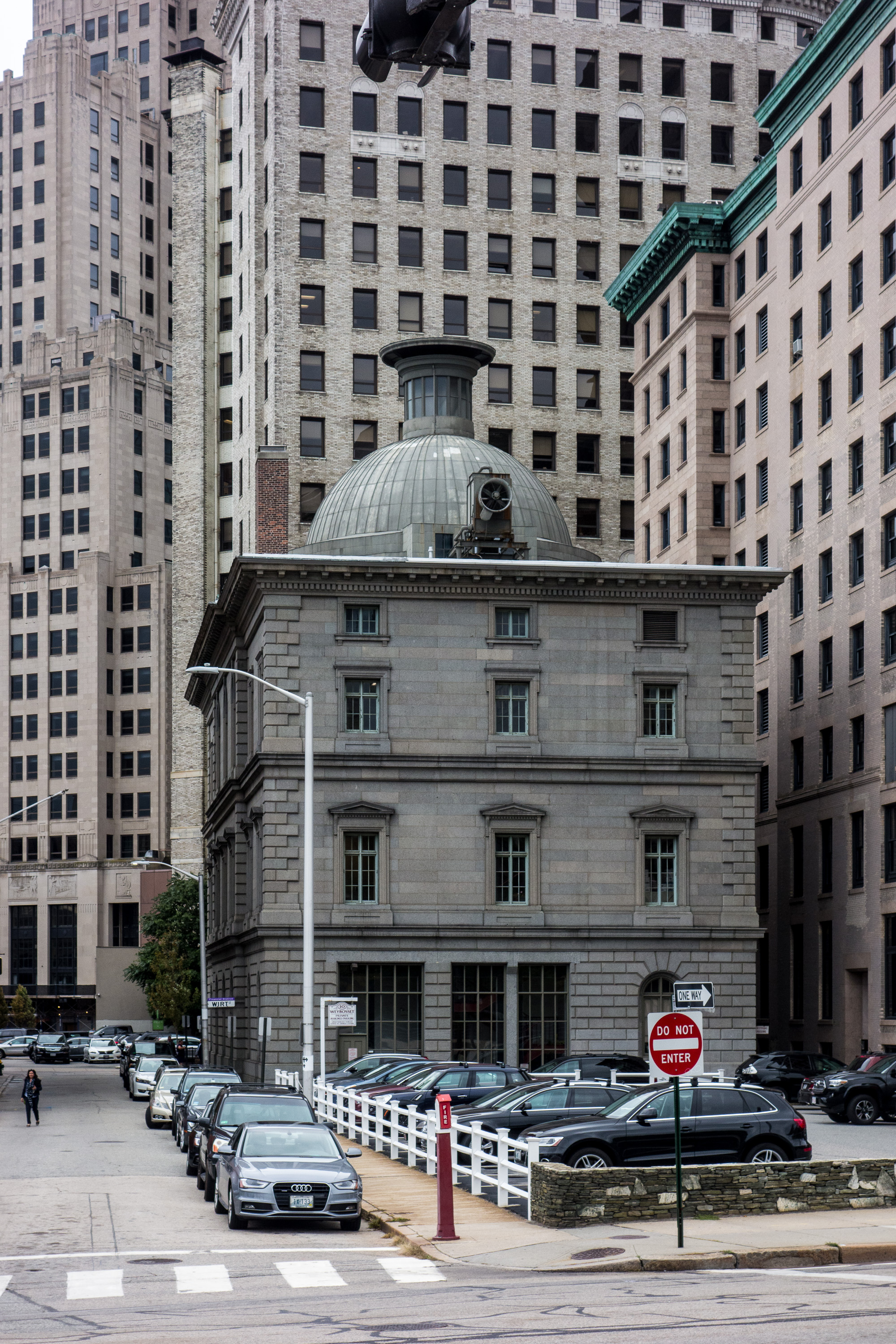
The rear of the building in 2016

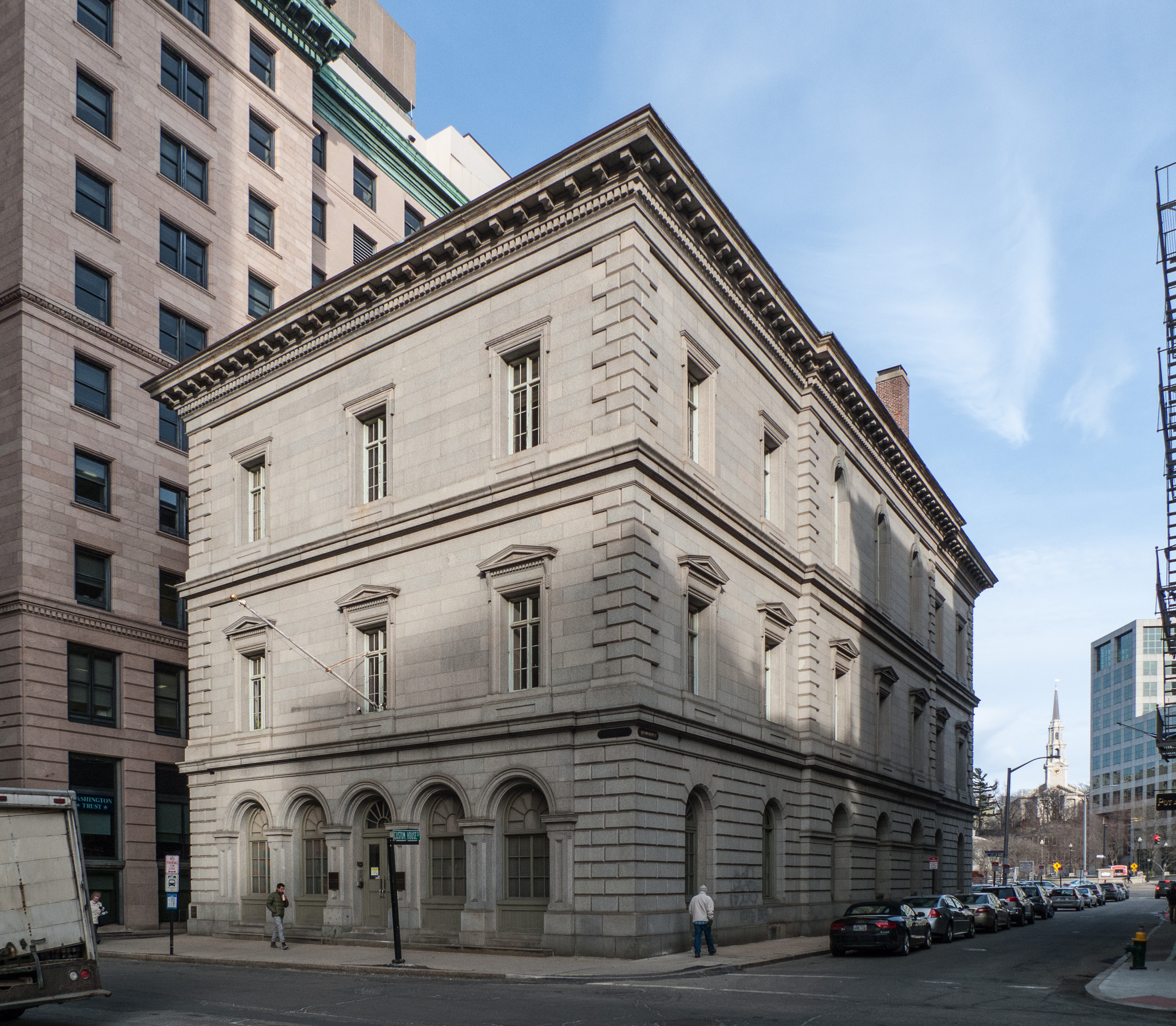
The building from Weybosset St. in 2017

== See also ==
- National Register of Historic Places listings in Providence, Rhode Island
