= Courts of Rhode Island =

Courts of Rhode Island include:

State courts of Rhode Island

- Rhode Island Supreme Court
  - Rhode Island Superior Courts
    - Rhode Island District Courts
    - Rhode Island Family Courts
    - Rhode Island Workers' Compensation Courts
    - Rhode Island Traffic Tribunals

Federal courts located in Rhode Island

- United States District Court for the District of Rhode Island
