= Federal Building (Providence, Rhode Island) =

- U.S. National Register of Historic Places
- U.S. Historic district – Contributing property

- Location within Rhode Island
- Location: Kennedy Plaza, Providence, Rhode Island
- Coordinates: 41°49′33″N 71°24′40″W
- Area: 0 acres (0 ha)
- Built: 1903
- Architect: Clarke & Howe
- Architectural style: Beaux Arts
- Part of: Downtown Providence Historic District (ID84001967)
- NRHP reference No.: 72000040

Significant dates
- Added to NRHP: April 13, 1972
- Designated CP: February 10, 1984

The Federal Building is a historic post office, courthouse and custom house on Kennedy Plaza in downtown Providence, Rhode Island. It is a courthouse for the United States District Court for the District of Rhode Island. It was built in 1908 by Clarke & Howe of limestone and steel and has a courtyard in the center.

== Building history ==
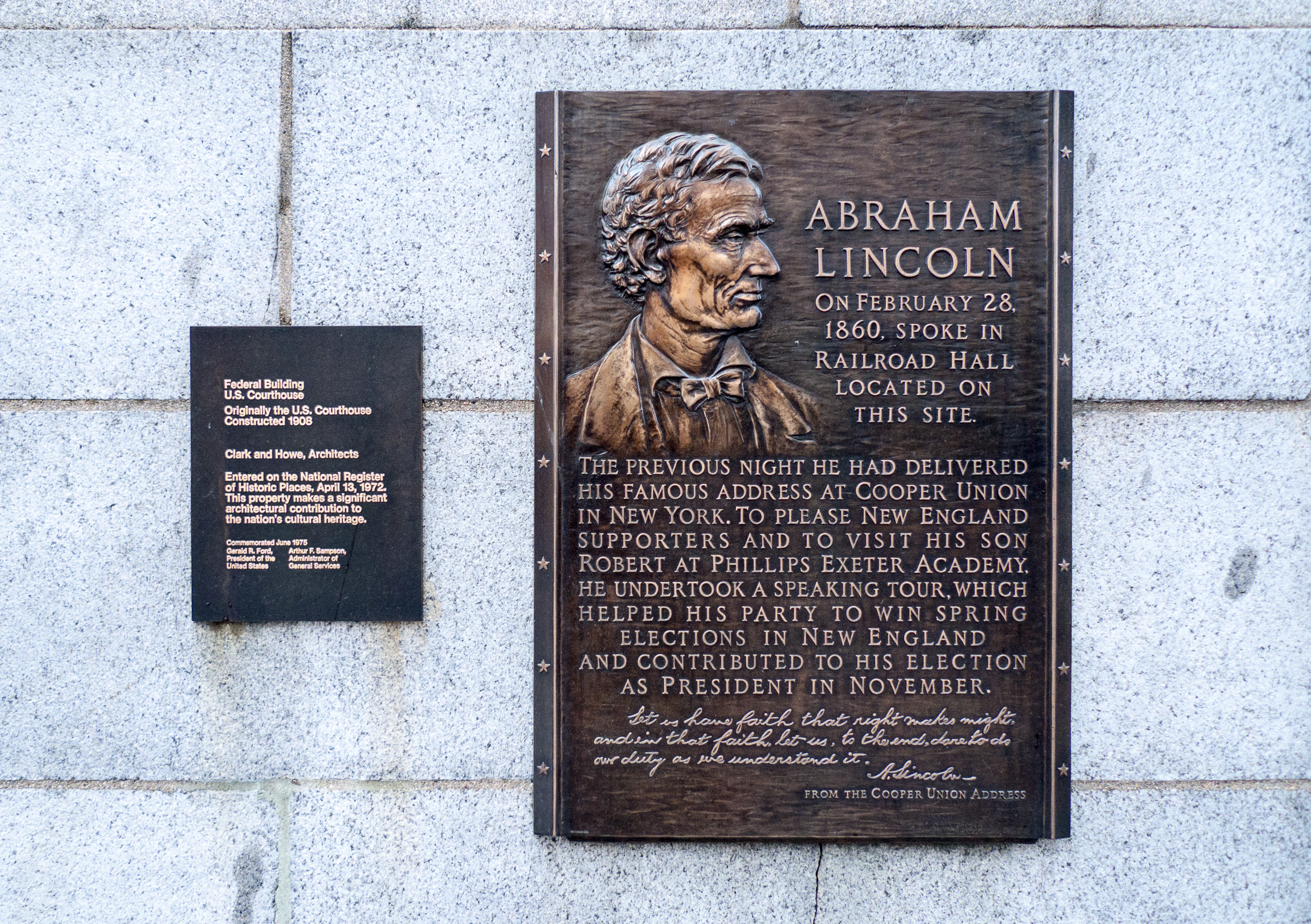
A plaque commemorates Abraham Lincoln's 1860 address in the Railroad Hall, which previously stood on the site of the Federal Building.

In 1900 the rapidly growing city of Providence began pressing Rhode Island's congressional delegation and officials in Washington about the need for a new federal building to replace the U.S. Customshouse. Congress was ultimately persuaded, in 1902, to appropriate $1 million for a post office, courthouse and custom house. In return, the city donated a site across from City Hall, at the eastern end of Exchange Place, to the federal government. The transfer was completed July 7, 1902.

The following year, the U.S. Treasury Department held a national design competition that attracted ten entries. The local firm of Clarke & Howe was unanimously selected as the winner. The jury, which consisted of James Knox Taylor, Supervising Architect of the Treasury, and several other prominent architects, remarked that the design was "an artistic building, excellently planned for its purpose," and that it would be "an ornament to the city of Providence." It was one of 35 federal buildings contracted to architectural firms under the provisions of the Tarsney Act of 1893. The Act authorized the Treasury Secretary to use private architects, selected through competition, to design Federal buildings and reflected a growing demand for greater architectural standards for public buildings.

Contractors Horton and Hemenway began construction in 1904—only two years after passage of the first omnibus public buildings law, which significantly changed the federal construction process. Construction was closely monitored by the Supervising Architect's Office with monthly progress photographs and building material samples sent to Washington. Construction required relocating railroad tracks and bridging the Providence River. Completed in 1908 at a cost of about $1.3 million, the Providence Post Office, Court House and Custom House was hailed as one of the finest federal buildings outside Washington.

Customs and postal functions were relocated over the years and the building was turned over to the U.S. General Services Administration in 1961. It was added to the National Register of Historic Places in 1972. Extensive renovation and restoration activities have been undertaken, most notably in the late 1970s and again in 1999–2001. The exterior of the Federal Building and U.S. Courthouse is virtually unchanged, and the lobby and two major courtrooms have been restored.

== Architecture ==
Located at the east end of Kennedy Plaza (formerly known as Exchange Place), in downtown Providence, the Federal Building and U.S. Courthouse is a notable example of the Beaux Arts style. The design seems to owe aspects of its form and detail to the New York Custom House (1900–1907), designed by Cass Gilbert. Completed in 1908, it is a five-story, rectangular structure, faced in New Hampshire granite over a steel frame, with a rusticated base. The building is almost perfectly on axis with the Second Empire style Providence City Hall (1873–1874) at the opposite end of the plaza, and was designed to complement it in style and massing.

The building is seven bays wide on the east and west sides and twelve bays long on the north and south sides. The east and west facades are dominated by central projecting pavilions. Each pavilion is articulated by four, three-story Corinthian order columns flanking window openings and linked by balustrades. At the second story, French windows are framed by engaged Doric columns and topped with sculptured swags and cartouches. Arched openings, enriched by keystones and swags, encompass the double-height windows that light the interior courtrooms at the third story.

The north and south sides of the building are less ornate. Above the rusticated base are a series of tripartite window openings flanked by colossal Corinthian pilasters. A heavy balustrade rises above the fourth-story cornice. It runs around all four sides, partially concealing the fifth story and the batten-seam lead-coated copper roof.

Allegorical statuary

Two groups of allegorical statues, designed by J. Massey Rhind of New York, flank the major entrances on the building's west side. The marble statues are twice life-size, and each consists of a central seated figure with smaller figures on either side. The group on the right represents "the Nation as Sovereign Power," flanked by Justice, and Law and Order; the one on the left depicts Providence as Independent Thought, flanked by Industry and Education.

The main lobby, located inside the west entrance, extends the width of the building. Finished in Indiana limestone, it has a 24-foot-high (7.3 m), groin vaulted and coffered ceiling that is detailed with rosettes. The ceiling remains among the building's most distinctive features. The curving main staircase opens off the south end of the lobby and leads to the upper stories.

Perhaps the most impressive interior space is the double-height chamber of the Federal District Court, located on the third floor above the west entrance. The walls are paneled in oak set behind paired colossal columns supporting an entablature topped by a vaulted ceiling with an elliptical stained-glass skylight. The main entrance, on axis with the judge's bench, is framed by pilasters carrying a broken segmental pediment, set on beautifully carved consoles. At the center of the pediment is an eagle, carved in oak, above a wreath with crossed flags and fasces.

The courtroom of the Equity Court is on the east side of the third floor. While somewhat smaller than the courtroom of the District Court, it is also a double-height space. The walls are similarly paneled in oak and set behind fluted columns and pilasters that support an entablature at the ceiling level.

== Significant events ==
- 1893: Passage of the Tarsney Act permits the Federal Government to hire private architects through competitions.
- 1900: Providence City Council meets with state's congressional delegation and Washington officials to discuss the city's need for a new federal building.
- 1902: Congress appropriates $1 million for construction, and the City Council transfers the site to the federal government. The first omnibus public buildings law is passed.
- 1903: Competition design by Providence architectural firm of Clarke & Howe is unanimously selected.
- 1904–1908: The Providence Post Office, Court House and Custom House is constructed.
- 1961: The building is turned over to the U.S. General Services Administration and renamed the Federal Building and U.S. Courthouse.
- 1972: The building is listed in the National Register of Historic Places.
- Late 1970s: Interior renovation and restoration work completed.
- 1999–2001: Building modernization includes systems replacement, new District Courtroom, seismic retrofitting and restoration work.

== Gallery ==
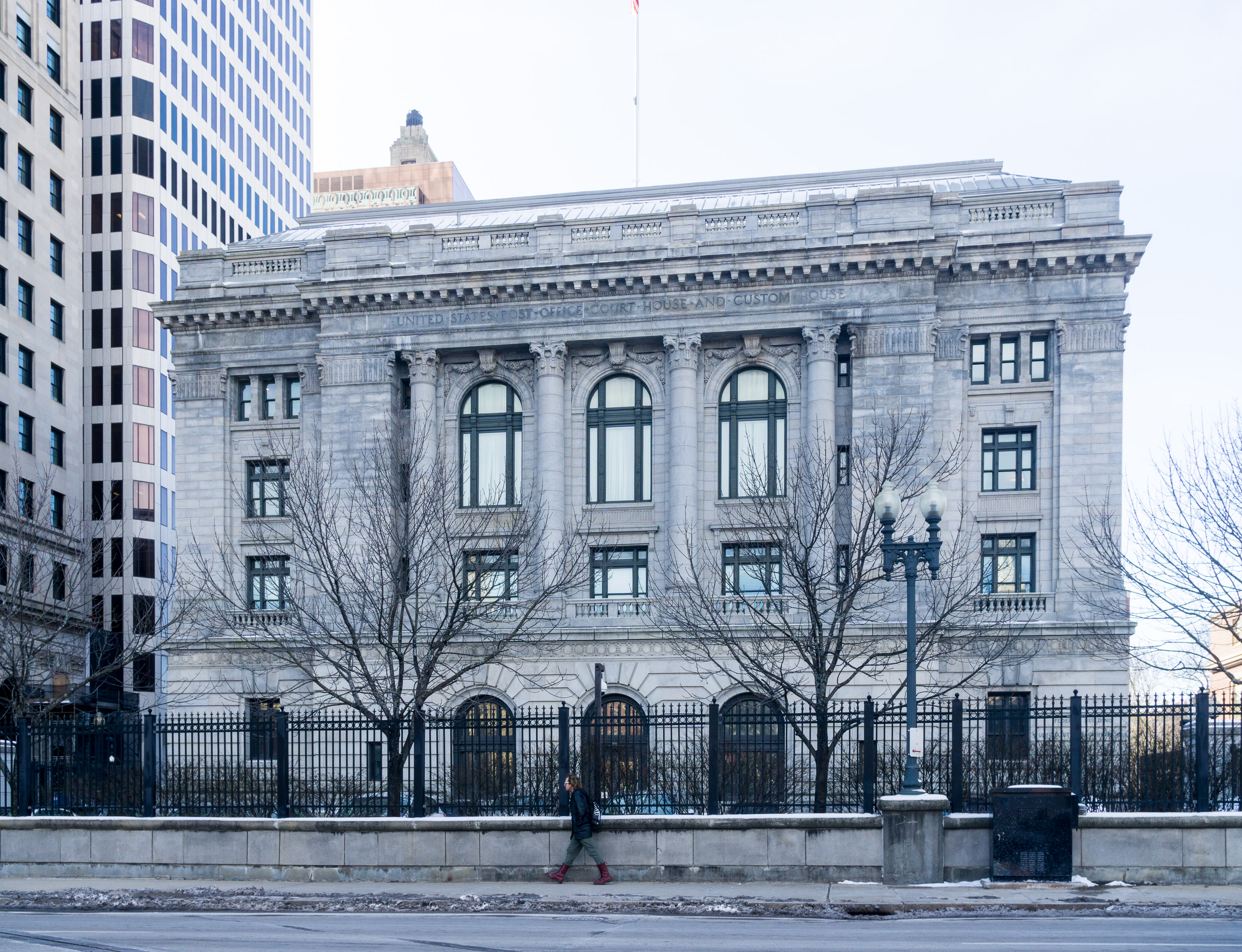
View from Memorial Boulevard (rear)

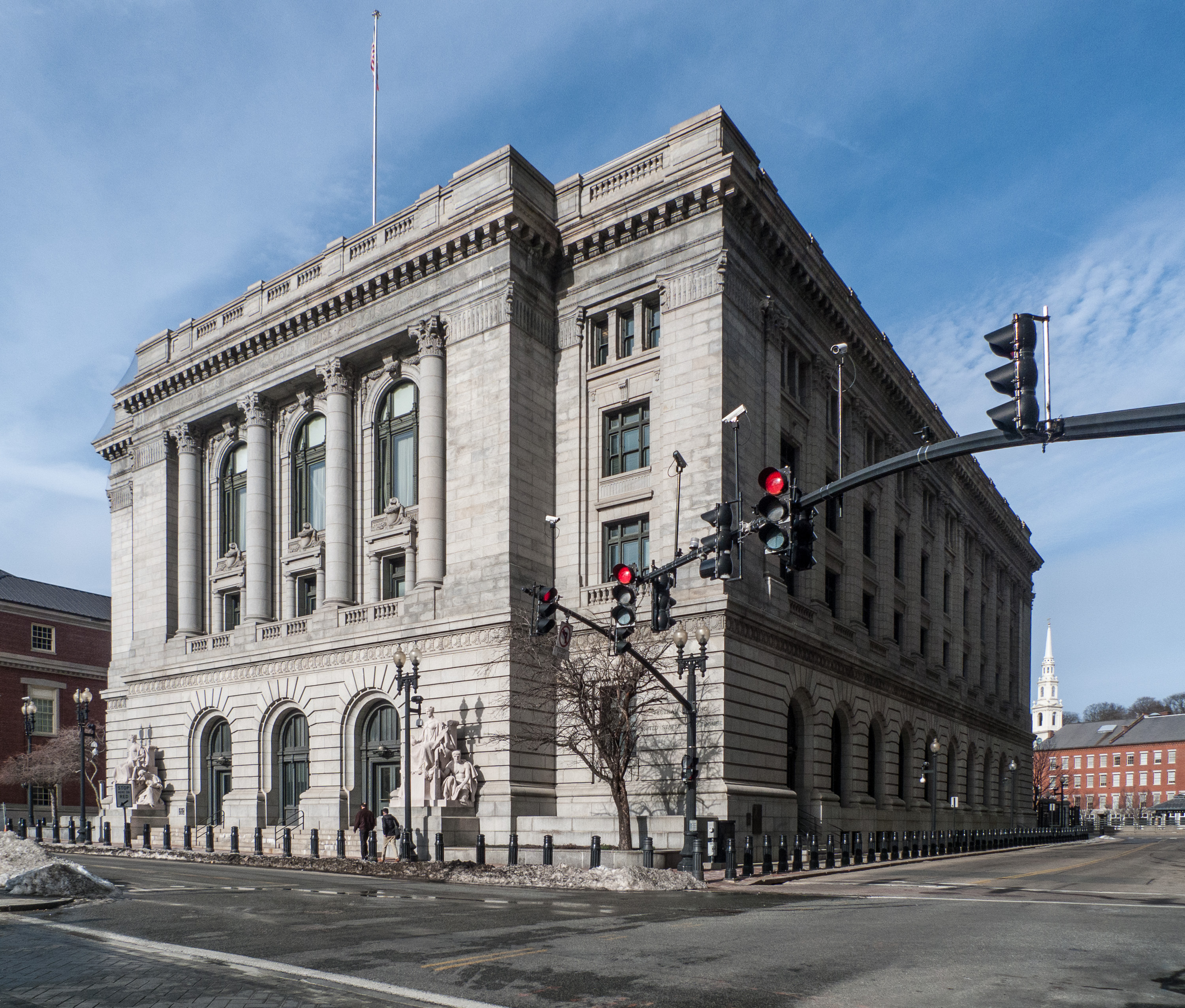
View from Kennedy Plaza (front)

Interior detail

Library

Courtroom interior

== See also ==
- National Register of Historic Places listings in Rhode Island
