= Ernest C. Torres =

American judge (born 1941)

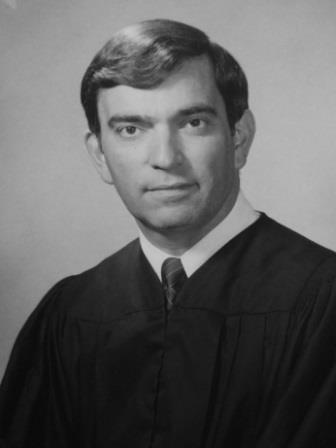

Senior Judge of the United States District Court for the District of Rhode Island
- In office December 1, 2006 – June 1, 2011

Chief Judge of the United States District Court for the District of Rhode Island
- In office 1999–2006
- Preceded by: Ronald Rene Lagueux
- Succeeded by: Mary M. Lisi

Judge of the United States District Court for the District of Rhode Island
- In office November 6, 1987 – December 1, 2006
- Appointed by: Ronald Reagan
- Preceded by: Bruce M. Selya
- Succeeded by: John J. McConnell Jr.

Personal details
- Born: October 6, 1941 (age 84) New Bedford, Massachusetts, U.S.
- Education: Dartmouth College (BA); Duke University (JD)

Ernest C. Torres (born October 6, 1941) is a former United States district judge of the United States District Court for the District of Rhode Island.

== Education and career ==
Born in New Bedford, Massachusetts, Torres received an Artium Baccalaureus degree from Dartmouth College in 1963 and a Juris Doctor from Duke University School of Law in 1968. He was in private practice in Providence, Rhode Island, from 1968 to 1980. He was a member of the Rhode Island House of Representatives from 1975 to 1980, serving as deputy minority leader from 1977 to 1980. He was an associate justice of the Rhode Island Superior Court from 1980 to 1985. He was an assistant vice president in charge of national staff counsel, Aetna Life Insurance Company from 1985 to 1986. He was in private practice in Providence from 1986 to 1988.

== Federal judicial service ==
Torres was nominated by President Ronald Reagan on June 22, 1987, to a seat on the United States District Court for the District of Rhode Island vacated by Judge Bruce M. Selya. He was confirmed by the United States Senate on November 5, 1987, and received his commission on November 6, 1987. He served as Chief Judge from 1999 to 2006. He assumed senior status on December 1, 2006, and retired June 1, 2011.

== Sources ==
Legal offices
| Preceded by Bruce M. Selya | Judge of the United States District Court for the District of Rhode Island; 1987–2006 | Succeeded by John J. McConnell Jr. |
| Preceded by Ronald Rene Lagueux | Chief Judge of the United States District Court for the District of Rhode Island; 1999–2006 | Succeeded by Mary M. Lisi |
