= Richard Santucci =

Richard Anthony Santucci is an American reconstructive urologist who currently lives and works in Austin, Texas.

Santucci is a graduate of the American Urological Association (AUA) Leadership Program Class of 2009, was a member of the AUA Urotrauma Guidelines panel, the AUA Urotrauma Legislation Task force, the World Health OrganizationInternational Consultation on Urologic Diseases (ICUD-urethra), and was an advisor to the US Marines Dismounted Blast Injuries Task Force. He recently served as the co-Chairman of the AUA Urethroplasty Guidelines panel, and. spent 18 years as a reconstructive urologist. He is the former Director of the Center for Urologic Reconstruction and Specialist-in-Chief for Urology at the Detroit Medical Center, focusing on urologic reconstruction and trauma including urethral stricture disease, ureteral injury, buried penis, and a variety of complex genital reconstruction surgeries.

Santucci is the co-editor of the texts Emergencies in Urology, Atlas of Urethroplasty, and Penile Reconstructive Surgery. He is the founding Editor-in-Chief of the online open-access Urology journal Advances in Urology, and co-creator of the high definition surgical video website, iclinics.org. His most highly cited article, Santucci RA, Joyce GF, Wise M. Male urethral stricture disease. The Journal of Urology. 2007 May;177(5):1667-74 has been cited 397 times according to Google Scholar

He is now a Senior Surgeon at Crane Surgical Services in Austin, Texas.
