= Juniper Hill Cemetery =

United States historic place in Bristol, RI

- U.S. National Register of Historic Places
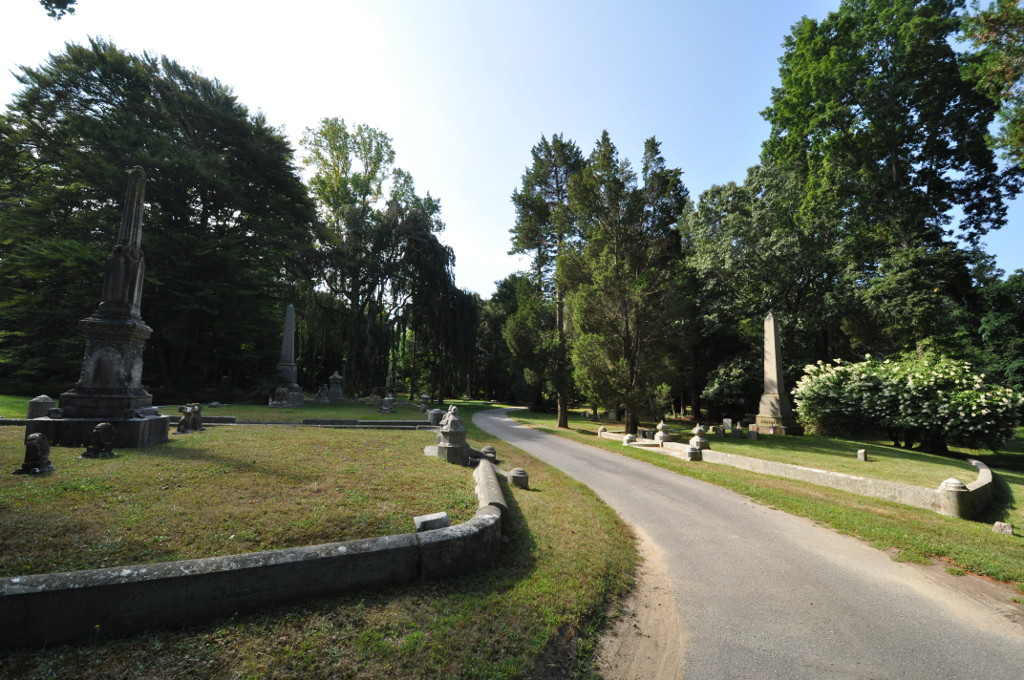

- Location within Rhode Island Location within the United States
- Location: Bristol, Rhode Island
- Coordinates: 41°40′53″N 71°16′05″W
- Area: 22 acres (8.9 ha)
- Built: 1857
- Architect: Niles B. Schubarth, Clifton A. Hall
- Architectural style: Late Gothic Revival, Mission/Spanish Revival
- NRHP reference No.: 98000632
- Added to NRHP: June 3, 1998

Juniper Hill Cemetery is a historic cemetery at 24 Sherry Avenue in Bristol, Rhode Island founded by George R.Usher, James D'Wolf Perry, Byron Diman, Ambrose E. Burnside, James H. West, Charles H. R. Doringle, and Lemanuel W. Briggs. The original 22 acres (89,000 m^{2}) were purchased from the descendants of Levi DeWolf, a local farmer and slave hauler, in 1855, and the cemetery corporation that owns it was chartered in January 1856. It is a fine example of the mid-19th century rural cemetery movement, with winding lanes and paths. The landscape was designed by Niles Bierragaard Schubarth, who had done similar work at other Rhode Island cemeteries. Its main entry is a massive stone gate built in 1876, and there is a gate house just inside, designed by Clifton A. Hall and constructed from granite quarried on site.

The cemetery was listed on the National Register of Historic Places in 1998.

== Notable burials ==
- Benjamin Bourne, US Representative, US district and appeals judge
- William Bradford, Lt. Governor, US Senator
- Jonathan Russell Bullock, Justice of the Rhode Island Supreme Court
- Samuel Pomeroy Colt, industrialist
- LeBaron Bradford Colt, US Senator
- Ethel Barrymore Colt, singer and actress
- Byron Diman, Governor of Rhode Island
- Francis M. Dimond, Governor of Rhode Island
- Samuel Dana Greene, Sr., USN, executive officer of the USS Monitor in the US Civil War
- Ramon Guiteras, surgeon, founder of the American Urological Association
- Gilbert C. Hoover, rear admiral, USN
- Mark Antony De Wolfe Howe, first bishop of Central Pennsylvania

== See also ==
- National Register of Historic Places listings in Bristol County, Rhode Island
