= William D. Steers =

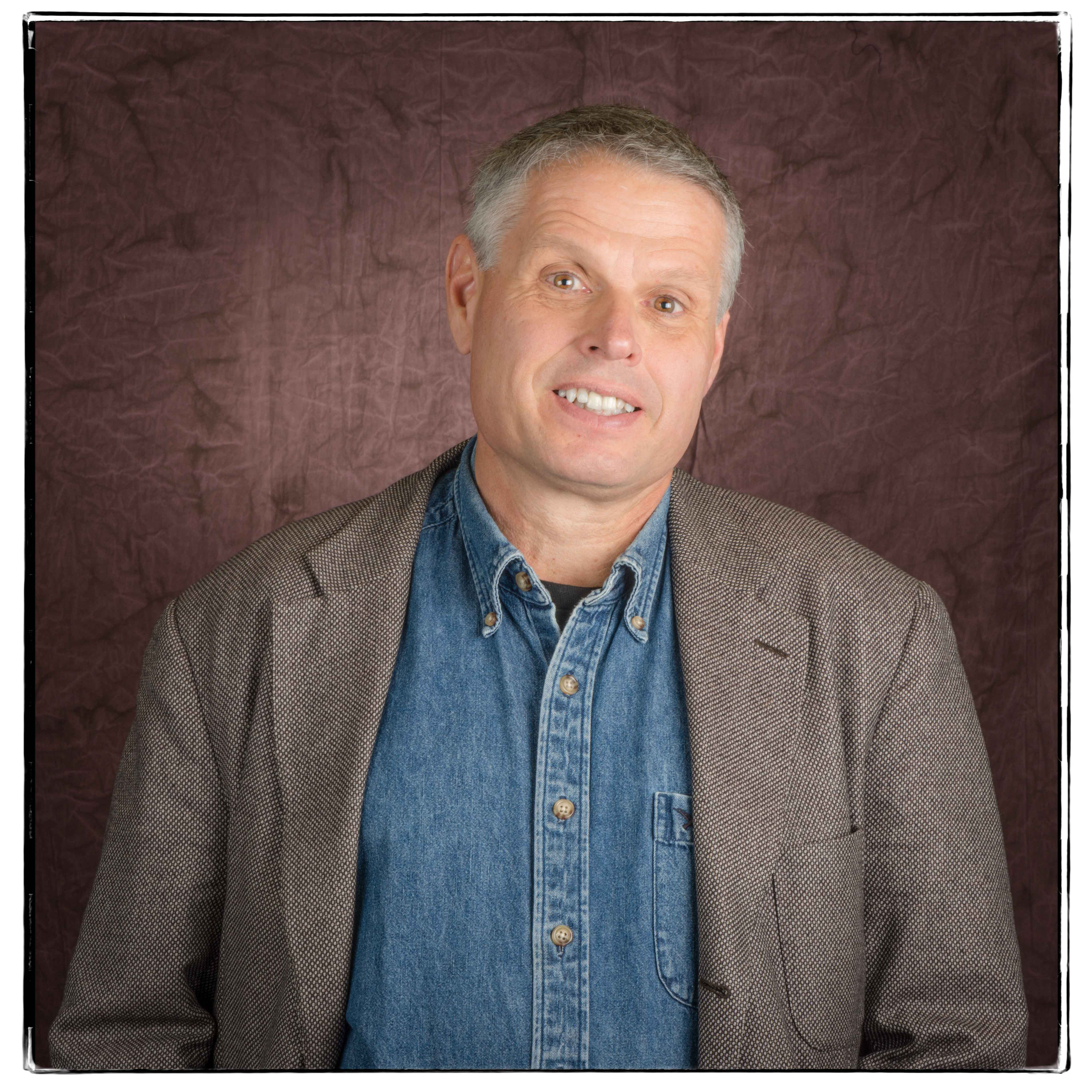
- Born: August 19, 1955; Toledo, Ohio, U.S.
- Died: April 10, 2015 (aged 59); Charlottesville, Virginia, U.S.
- Education: Medical College of Ohio; Cornell University
- Awards: Hovey Dabney Professorship
- Scientific career
- Fields: Urology, neuropharmacology
- Workplaces: University of Virginia School of Medicine; American Board of Urology; The Journal of Urology

William D. Steers (August 19, 1955 – April 10, 2015) was a Paul Mellon professor and chair of the Department of Urology at the University of Virginia School of Medicine. He was a president of the American Board of Urology (ABU) and editor of The Journal of Urology. In 2003, the University of Virginia awarded Steers the Hovey Dabney Professorship. In 2004, Dr. Steers initiated the Charlottesville Men's Four Miler road race to raise funds for men's health. Steers was a viticulturist, and co-owned Well Hung Vineyard in Charlottesville. He developed YOURometer, an iPhone app used to record urological related symptoms.

== Education ==
Steers obtained his degree in chemical engineering from Cornell University in 1977, and his medical degree in 1980, from the Medical College of Ohio. After a urology residency at the University of Texas Health Science Center at Houston and University of Texas MD Anderson Cancer Center, Steers completed a fellowship in neuropharmacology at the University of Pittsburgh.

== Career ==
Steers was a faculty member at the University of Virginia School of Medicine since 1988, and became chair of the Department of Urology in 1995. His most cited publication is the 1998 paper published in The New England Journal of Medicine which first described the clinical efficacy of Viagra.

In 2007, Steers was appointed editor of The Journal of Urology, a position which he held for the remainder of his life. He was also President of the American Board of Urology for the period 2010-2011, served as chair of the joint ABU/ABOG fellowship in female pelvic medicine, and Director on the American Board of Obstetrics and Gynecology. Steers was a member of the U.S. Food and Drug Administration's Reproductive Medicine Advisory Panel, and chaired the National Institutes of Health's urinary incontinence and interstitial cystitis clinical trial groups.

In 2011, Steers was appointed to the advisory council at National Institutes of Health by Kathleen Sebelius and Francis Collins. Steers was President of the University of Virginia physician’s practice plan from 2002-2009, and was a member of the Health System Strategic Planning and Executive Committees.

Steers' entrepreneurial activities include the development of a cell phone application to record patient symptoms, and using the internet crowdcasting to fund medical research.

"Isaac Asimov predicted in 1976 that I would someday be operating with a robot. By golly, he was right!"

— William D. Steers, MD. The University of Toledo Alumni Who Have Changed The World. Volume II. page 67.

== Awards ==
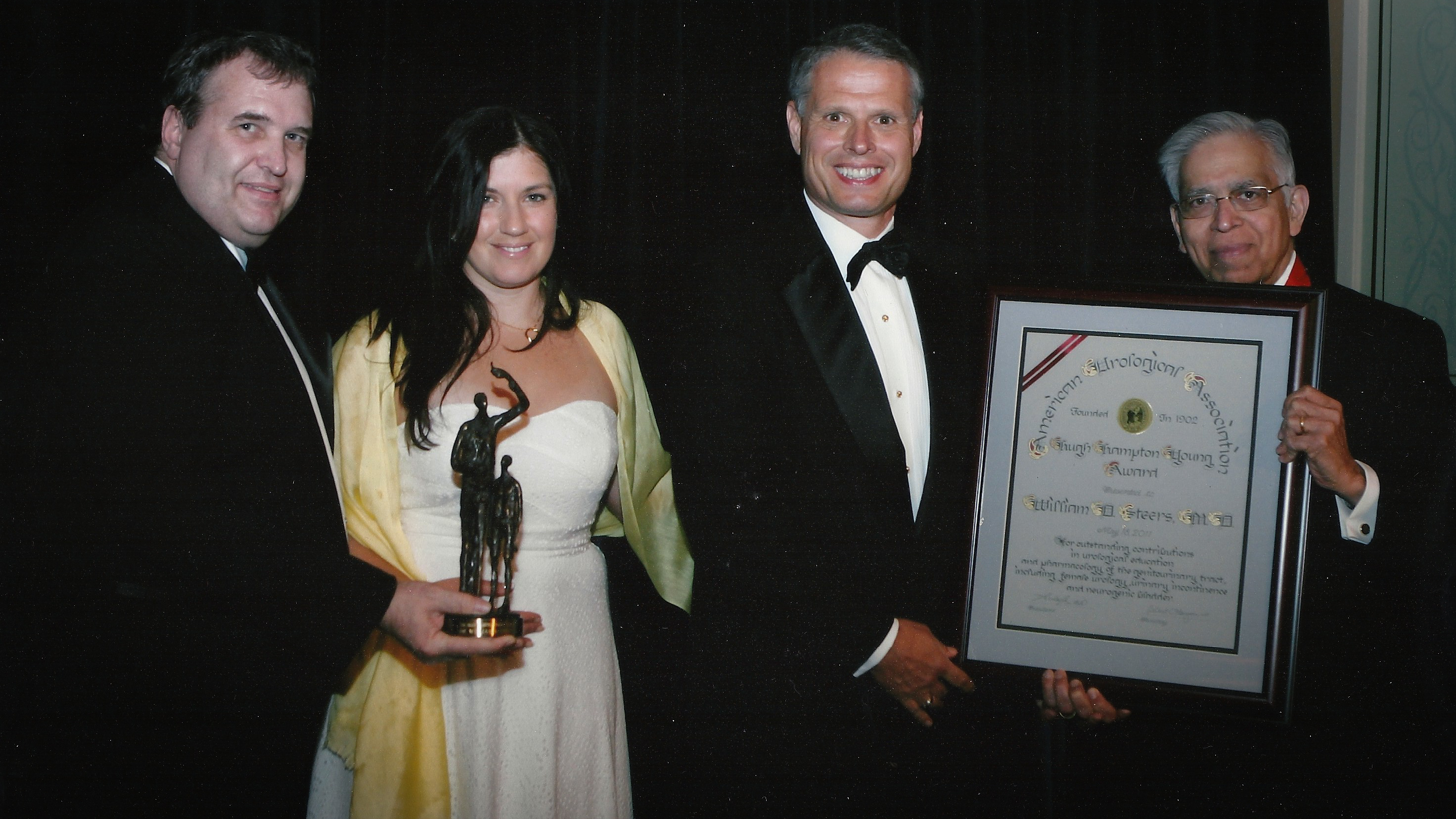
Dr. William D. Steers is awarded the Hugh Hampton Young Award for outstanding contributions in urological education and pharmacology of the genitourinary tract, including female urology, urinary incontinence and neurogenic bladder, 2011

Steers was named by Men's Health magazine as one of the top fifteen doctors for men in the U.S. He was awarded the American Urological Association's Hugh Hampton Young Award, Gold Cystoscope Award, Dornier’s Innovation prize, Gineste Award for research in erectile dysfunction, the Zimskind Award in Neurourology, the annual Castle Connelly.

== Societies ==
- Clinical Society
- American Association of Genitourinary Surgeons
- Society for Basic Urologic Research

== Publications ==
- Solifenacin treatment in men with overactive bladder: effects on symptoms and patient-reported outcomes. Authors Kaplan SA, Goldfischer ER, Steers, William D., Gittelman M, Andoh M, Forero-Schwanhaeuser S. Aging Male. 2010 Jun;13(2):100-7.
- Prevalence of and risk factors for urine leakage in a racially and ethnically diverse population of adults: the Boston Area Community Health (BACH) Survey. Authors Tennstedt SL, Link CL, Steers, William D., McKinlay JB. New England Research Institutes, Watertown, MA 02111, USA.
- The impact of stress incontinence surgery on female sexual function. Authors Brubaker L, Chiang S, Zyczynski H, Norton P, Kalinoski DL, Stoddard A, Kusek JW, Steers, William D.; Urinary Incontinence Treatment Network. Department of Obstetrics and Gynecology, Loyola University Chicago, Maywood, IL, USA.
- Patient-centered treatment goals for pelvic floor disorders: association with quality-of-life and patient satisfaction. Authors Bovbjerg VE, Trowbridge ER, Barber MD, Martirosian TE, Steers, William D., Hullfish KL.
- Oral sildenafil in the treatment of erectile dysfunction. 1998. Authors Goldstein I, Lue TF, Padma-Nathan H, Rosen RC, Steers, William D., Wicker PA.
- Tachyphylaxis and phosphodiesterase type 5 inhibitors. Author Steers, William D.
- Viability and safety of combination drug therapies for erectile dysfunction. Author Steers, William D.

=== On Film ===
William D. Steers. A biographical documentary film. Produced by Heritage Film Project and directed by Eduardo Montes-Bradley. Filmed in Charlottesville

== See also ==
- Bill Steers Men's 4-Miler
