= Raymond Costabile =

Raymond A. Costabile
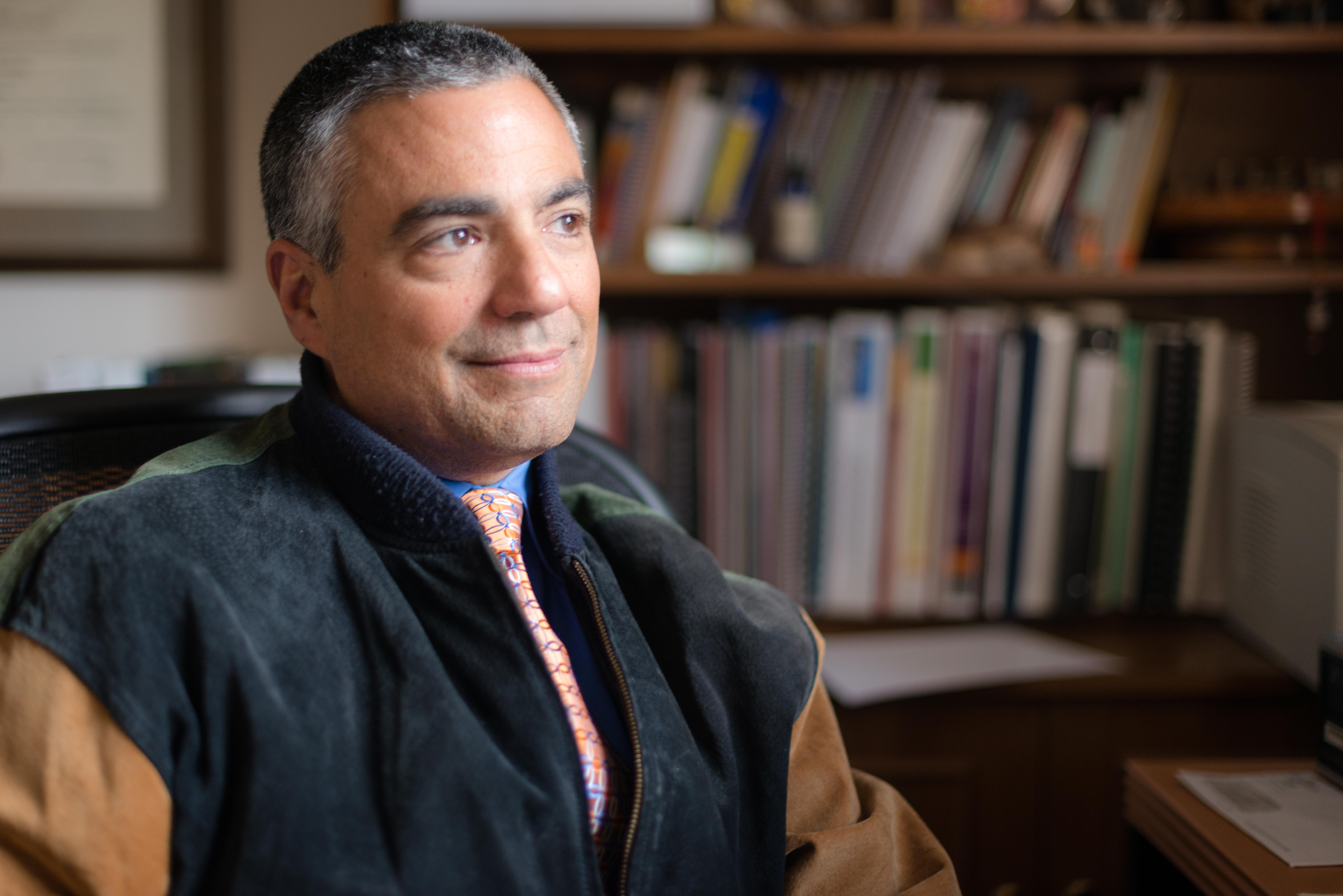
- Chairman of the Department of Urology at the University of Virginia
- Born: 1958 (age 67–68); Washington, DC
- Alma mater: Georgetown University
- Awards: US Army Legion of Merit and the Bronze Star, Iraq War, 2003, America's Top Physicians, Consumers' Research Council of America, 2010.
- Scientific career
- Fields: Urology
- Workplaces: US Army, University of Virginia, American Board of Urology, Journal of Urology

Raymond A. Costabile (born in 1958 in Washington, DC) is professor, and chair urology with the Department of Urology at the School of Medicine of the University of Virginia. Costabile is a retired colonel in the US Army and the former chief of urology service at Madigan Army Medical Center. Costabile is an author; his articles on men's reproductive health and infertility have been published in The Journal of Urology and Proceedings in the National Academy of Sciences, among other peer-reviewed scholarly journals. He has also been featured in television interviews in the national media.

== Higher education ==
Costabile obtained his B.S. from the Georgetown University. He received his medical degree in 1984 from Georgetown University School of Medicine, and finished his urology residency at Walter Reed Army Medical Center in 1991. Costabile completed a specialty fellowship in Impotence and Infertility at the University of Virginia in 1993.

== US Army ==
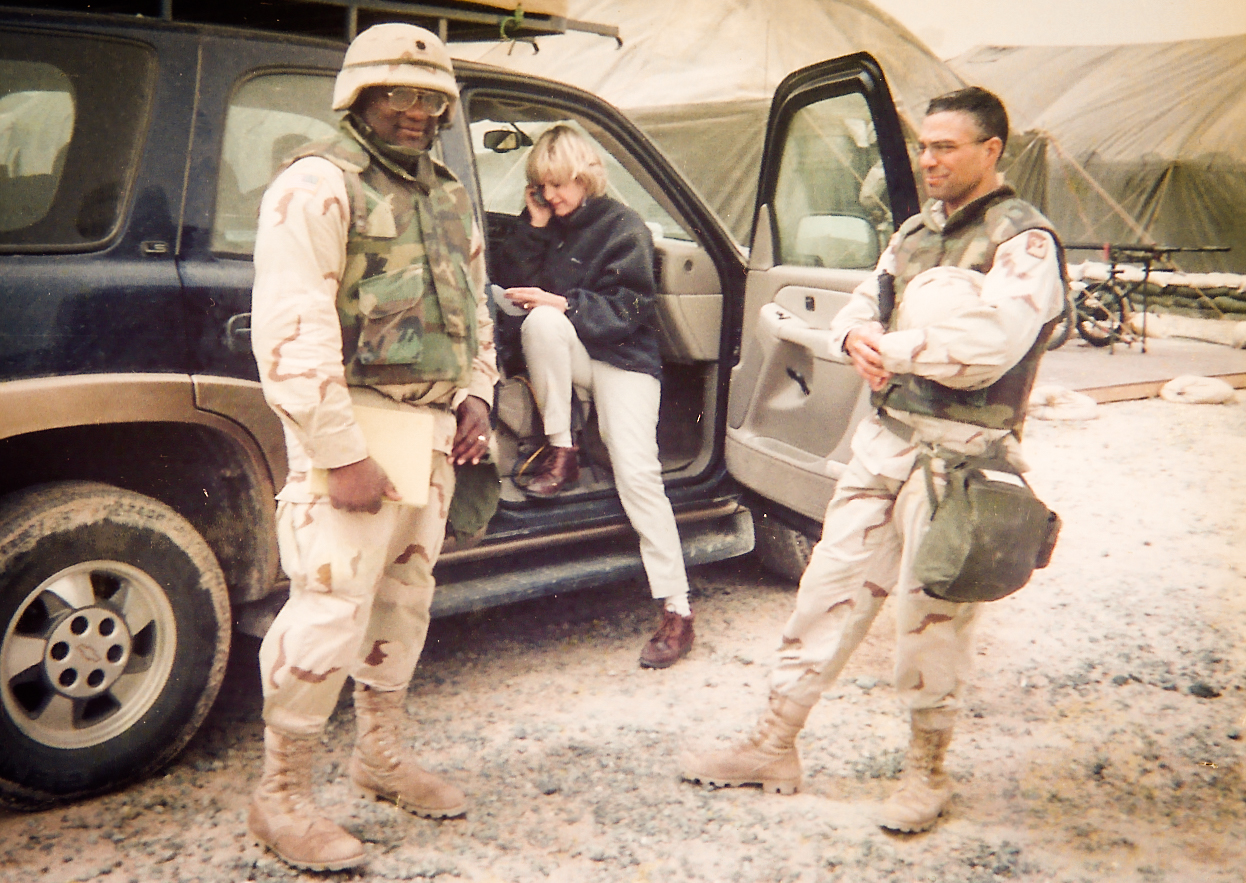
Dr. Raymond Costabile, Iraq 2003

In 1993 Costabile was appointed Staff Urologist at Walter Reed Army Medical Center, a position he held until 1999. During this time he was also an assistant professor at the Department of Surgery of the Uniformed Services University of Health Sciences in Bethesda. He subsequently achieved the tenured position of professor, a position he holds to the present day.

In 1999 Costabile was promoted to chief of Urology Service and Urology Residency Program Director at Madigan Army Medical Center, one of the world's largest military urologic centers. Prior to retirement from the military in 2004, he volunteered for deployment in the Iraq War. During his deployment, he commanded the 47th Combat Support Hospital. Under Costabile's command, the 47th CSH was the principal coalition combat hospital, responsible for caring for over 92% of all battle casualties during the initial nine months of the conflict.

== University of Virginia ==
In 2004, Costabile returned to the University of Virginia, where he is the Jay Y. Gillenwater Professor and Vice Chairman of the Department of Urology. He presently heads the men's reproductive health and infertility practice, with a particular focus in the areas of male infertility, vasectomy reversal, penile and urethral reconstruction, male and female sexual health, and urologic oncology. At the Department of Urology, Costabile also directs UVA's Andrology Fellowship, a one-year physician's training program in men's sexual health.

Since 2008, Costabile has been the senior associate dean for clinical strategy, as well as a chief medical officer with oversight responsibility for the UVA School of Medicine's outreach programs and activities. In the latter role, he worked to establish three large, multi-specialty clinics in rural areas peripheral to UVA and Charlottesville.

== Awards ==
- Legion of Merit and the Bronze Star, Iraq War, 2003.

== Professional societies ==
- American Urologic Association (AUA)
- Examination Committee Member, International Urologic Association
- American Society of Andrology (ASA)
- International Society for the Study of Women's Sexual Health (ISSWSH)
- Society for the Study of Male Reproduction (SSMR)
- Sexual Medicine Society of North America (SMSNA)
- American Fertility Society (AFS)
- American College of Surgeons Oncology Group (ACOSOG)
- Uniformed Services Urology Research Group (USURG)
- Society of Government Service Urologists (SGSU)
- Mid-Atlantic Section, American Urological Association
- Washington Urologic Society
- Virginia Urological Society

== Selected writings ==
- "Clinical Urologic Endocrinology: Principles for Men's Health". Springer, London 2012.
- "Vasovasostomy and Vasoepididymostomy". Hinman's Atlas of Urologic Surgery, 3rd Edition. Saunders, Philadelphia, PA. 2012.
- "Sexual Disorders". Professional Guide to Diseases, Wolter Kluwer Health, Lippincott, Williams & Wilkins, 2013.
- "Surgery of the Scrotum and Seminal Vesicles". Campbell-Walsh Urology. Saunders Co. Wein, Kavoussi, Partin, Peters. 2012.
