= Attorney General Bullock =

Attorney General Bullock may refer to:

- J. Russell Bullock (1815–1899), Attorney General of Rhode Island
- Steve Bullock (American politician) (born 1966), Attorney General of Montana

== See also ==
- General Bullock (disambiguation)
