= Costabile =

Costabile is a surname. Notable people with the surname include:

- David Costabile (born 1967), American actor
- Francesco Costabile (born 1980), Italian film director
- Raymond Costabile (born 1958), American urologist
- Sérgio Costabile (born 2000), Brazilian footballer
