= Judge Bingham =

Judge Bingham may refer to:

- George Hutchins Bingham (1864–1949), judge of the United States Court of Appeals for the First Circuit
- John Bingham (1815–1900), judge of the Harrison County, Ohio, Court of Common Pleas
- Kinsley S. Bingham (1808–1861), judge of the probate court of Livingston County, Michigan
- Robert Worth Bingham (1871–1937), judge of the circuit court of Jefferson County, Kentucky

== See also ==
- Justice Bingham (disambiguation)
