= William P. Didusch Center for Urologic History =

Museum in Linthicum, Maryland

Coordinates: 39°12′34.5″N 76°40′24″W

The William P. Didusch Center for Urologic History is a museum and the headquarters of the American Urological Association in Linthicum, Maryland. It is described as encompassing "a rich and varied collection of drawings, photographs, and instruments of historical importance to urology, many displayed in the urological exhibits during the American Urological Association (AUA) conventions."

== Background ==
The center is named in honor of William Didusch, the museum's founder and first curator. Didusch was a notable scientific illustrator, and Executive Secretary of the AUA. Didusch had begun working at Johns Hopkins University in 1915 as an illustrator and eventually a lecturer. Didusch was an artist but more committed to the drawing of illustrations, rather than paintings, of anatomy. As result he became a legend during his time after his work in Johns Hopkins Hospital. Some of his many illustrations were those of the anatomy of the urinary tract and instruments used to treat the urinary diseases. The museum was formally established in 1971 as the William P. Didusch Museum, following Didusch's gift to the American Urological Association of his many original urological drawings. It was accommodated within the headquarters buildings of the AUA, then on Charles Street in Baltimore. Didusch curated the museum until his death in 1981, when he was succeeded by Herbert Brendler. After Brendler's death in 1986, William W. Scott (a colleague of Nobel Laureate Charles Huggins at the University of Chicago) became curator of the museum. When Scott retired in 1993, the post of curator went to Rainer Engel of Johns Hopkins. In 2003 – when the AUA moved to Linthicum, Maryland – the museum also moved. Its scope was extended to relate to the topic of research in urologic history. Engel remained curator until 2011, when Michael Moran took over the position.

== Collection ==
One of the collection of Didusch drawings displayed in the museum

The museum provides 300 years of the history of urology, beginning from early and extremely dangerous kidney stone surgeries to modern ultra sound treatments that "pulverizes these jagged mineral clumps without any need to enter the body". It includes illustrations, urological tools such as catheters, cystoscopes (includes Nitze cystoscopes made in 1890 with platinum loops for illumination and rotating cystoscopes), operating resectoscopes, laparoscopes, lithotriptors, and resectoscopes; some of this urologic equipment was sterilized using formaldehyde or cyanide. All was donated by urologists, including Ernest F. Hock of Binghamton, New York, Hans Reuter of Stuttgart, Germany and Adolf A. Kutzmann of Los Angeles.

The Center also aids research in all fields of urologic history in the United States. It contains an extensive urological library, with early urological and medical texts, and the AUA archives.

Current AUA Historian Engel considers the museum to show how medical history in urology evolved, and notes that the implements on display frequently scare visitors. Amongst its items are "long, thick metal tubes that once opened the floodgates between some unfortunate soul's bladder and the outside world", lassoes and nutcrackers on the end of steel tubes to break bladder stones, and Hugh Hampton Young's "Prostate Punch", which resembles a "massively enlarged and curved hypodermic needle designed for the blind resection of prostate tissues", used in prostate surgery (to ream out the tube of prostate tissue blindly); this last implement was used on the wealthy railway magnate Diamond Jim Brady, who—cured of a prostate problem—gave a generous donation to Johns Hopkins which enabled the establishment of the Brady Urological Institute and also the museum.

A number of very large mineral samples of kidney stones are also on display. The collection in the museum also includes more than 30 microscopes dating as far back as the 18th century, along with operating manuals; this acquisition on loan from a German urology family.

A popular display is the "spermatorrhea ring", a device from the early 20th century used to prevent ejaculations while sleeping. It is made of a double ring of metal, with the inner ring clipped over the penis and the outer ring, which is lined on the inside with an armature of blunt metal teeth, on the shaft. These teeth constitute what could be called the "medically active ingredient". In the event of voluntary unknowing erection while sleeping, "the sensitive skin of the engorged part expands against the spiky outer ring, and the sleeper is pricked into consciousness in time to prevent nature from committing an unspeakable crime against itself".
