= The Society for Basic Urologic Research =

The Society for Basic Urologic Research (SBUR) is a US-based basic urological researcher's society with ~600 active members in the US, Europe and Asia, including laboratory and physician scientists (Ph.D.'s, M.D.'s, M.D.-Ph.D.'s, and trainees) in academia, industry and the government. The major research interest areas are normal physiology and pathophysiology of the organs in the genitourinary system including the kidney, the bladder, the prostate, the testis and the penis. The SBUR holds two annual meetings each year. The SBUR Spring meeting in May of each year is part of the American Urological Association's (AUA) annual meeting, on the third Saturday of the month. The SBUR Fall-Winter meeting is the Society's independent research symposium featuring plenary sessions and poster sessions over four days. The SBUR and the European Society for Urological Research (ESUR) alternate to host the World Basic Urological Research Congress every two years on the two continents. Some of the recent topics for discussion at these meetings include hormone-refractory prostate cancer and inflammatory diseases in the prostate such as benign prostatic hyperplasia (BPH), among others. Researchers in the SBUR are actively studying the disease mechanisms and looking for better methods of diagnosing and treating the many urological disorders that compromise the quality of life with aging.

A Reunion of SBUR Presidents, Atlanta, May 2006. From Left to Right: Donald Coffey (1988-89), Michael Freeman (2002-03), Diane Felsen (2003-04), Shuk-mei Ho (2005-06), Ralph Buttyan (2000-01), Donald Tindall (1992-93), Robert Getzenberg (2006-07), Natasha Kyprianou (2004-05), James Mohler (2007-08), Timothy Ratliff (1987-88), Chung Lee (1994-95).

== History ==
The idea of organizing the SBUR was initiated in early 1985 by Dr. Timothy L. Ratliff, then a young urologic researcher, who discussed the idea with Dr. Warren “Skip” Heston and Dr. William Catalona, receiving enthusiastic support from the two senior scientists. The SBUR-organizing meeting was held in 1986 at the AUA Annual Meeting in New York with a group of about 15 scientists attending to finalize the idea of a new society by the name of The Society for Basic Urologic Research. Drs. Evelyn Barrack, Ralph Buttyan, Donald Coffey, Warren Heston, Dolores Lamb, Chung Lee, David Lubaroff, Timothy Ratliff, Gregor Reid, and Roy Smith were among the attendees. At the meeting Dr. Ratliff, the Founding President of the SBUR, assumed the responsibility of organizing the first scientific meeting in 1987 and drafting the first bylaws, which were required for establishment of a non-profit status. Dr. Chung Lee worked diligently with Dr. Ratliff and was instrumental in modifying the bylaws to conform to the legal requirements for SBUR as a non-profit society in Illinois, to begin raising funds for the scientific meeting. Dr. Paul Peters, then Secretary of the AUA, provided space for the first SBUR scientific meeting free of charge at the 1987 AUA Annual Meeting (May 17–21, 1987, Anaheim, California). Leaders of urology programs throughout the country were uniformly supportive of organizing SBUR and many provided travel expenses for urologic scientists to attend the first meeting, thanks to the tireless efforts by Dr. Ratliff. The first SBUR scientific meeting was small with around 50-60 attendees, but everyone considered the meeting a success. Enthusiasm for SBUR increased as a result, making the organization of the subsequent meetings much easier.

With the growth and advancement of the urological research field and the Society’s goals and objectives, the formal, independent annual meeting of the Society began to be held in the fall of each year starting in 1992. The first fall meeting was held at the Mayo Clinic, Rochester, Minnesota, attended by a very encouraging number of 145 members. The level of enthusiasm for the annual fall meetings continued to grow over the years, as did the membership of the Society, now with close to 600 members worldwide. The SBUR annual fall meetings represent honor, prestige, and recognition to members and invited speakers, and the scientific themes chosen are timely and sophisticated. Further evidence of the successes enjoyed by the SBUR fall meetings is the stronger and growing tie between the Society and the European urologic societies. The SBUR once again changed the formula of the fall meeting to welcome the association with the European colleagues and to meet the new challenges of the advancing field. Now, every other year, the SBUR fall meeting is held as an international joint meeting with the ESUR alternating between a European and a US city. The 2005 annual fall meeting was a joint meeting of the SBUR and the ESUR, held in early December in Miami Beach, Florida. This meeting was later renamed the 6th World Basic Urological Research Congress. In 2007 the 7th World Basic Urological Research Congress was held in September in Dublin, Ireland.

== Benefits to the public ==
The SBUR fall annual meetings are the best time and place to learn about the most recent advances in basic and preclinical research with the goals of improving treatment of and preventing urological diseases, such as cancers of the prostate, the bladder, and the kidney. The 2008 SBUR Fall Meeting was held in Phoenix, Arizona, with the scientific theme of "Epigenetics and Genitourinary Disorders".
