= United States Senate Committee on Conservation of National Resources =

The United States Senate Committee on Conservation of National Resources was established in 1909 and terminated in 1921.

The committee considered the resources of Alaskan seal fisheries.

== Chairmen of the Committee on Conservation of National Resources ==
- Joseph M. Dixon (R-MT) 1910–1913
- Marcus A. Smith (D-AZ) 1913
- James K. Vardaman (D-MS) 1913–1918
- Ellison D. Smith (D-SC) 1918–1919
- LeBaron B. Colt (R-RI) 1919–1921
