= Calvert Magruder =

American judge (1893–1968)

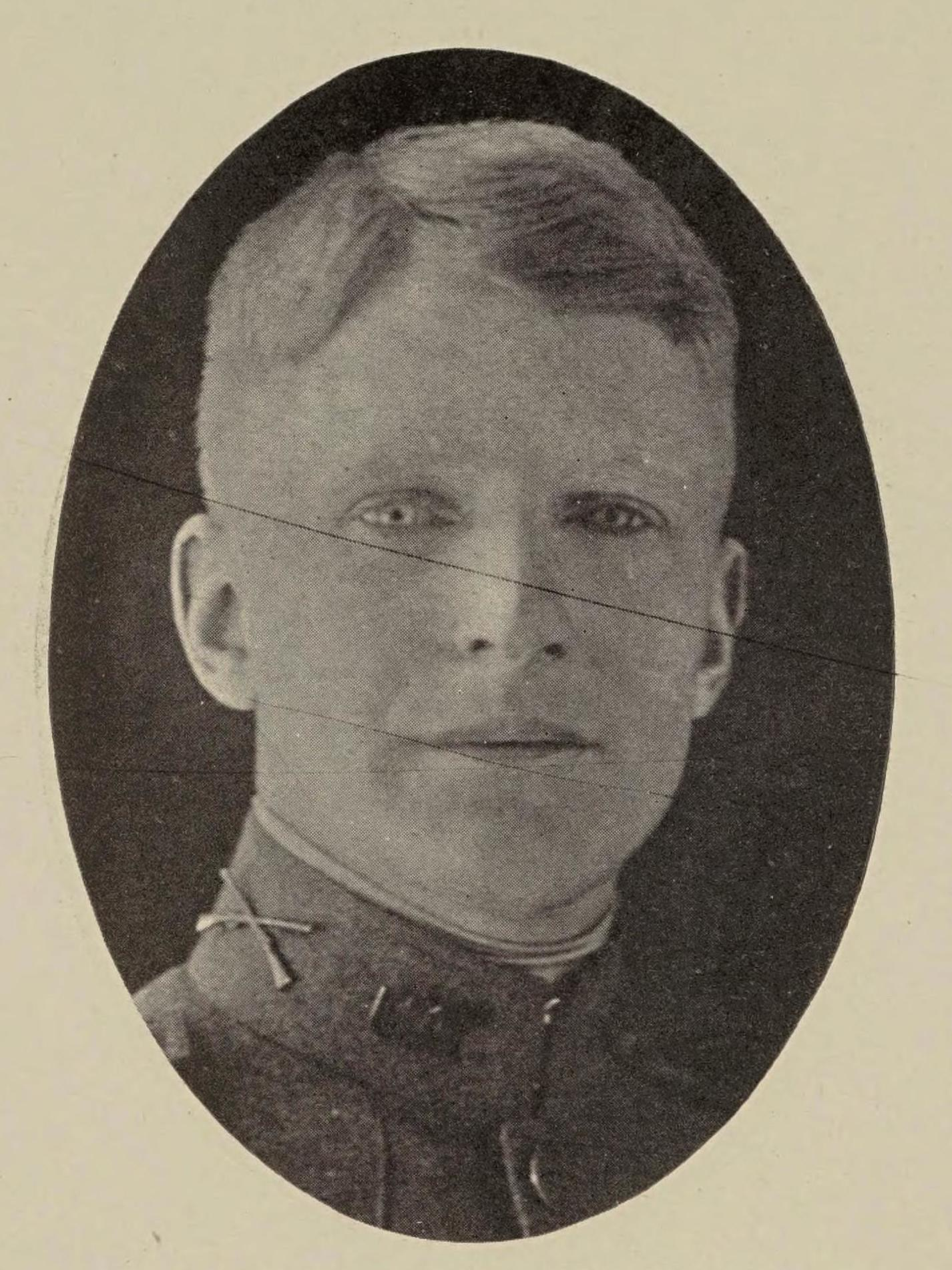

Senior Judge of the United States Court of Appeals for the First Circuit
- In office June 12, 1959 – May 22, 1968

Chief Judge of the United States Court of Appeals for the First Circuit
- In office 1948–1959
- Preceded by: Office established
- Succeeded by: Peter Woodbury

Judge of the United States Court of Appeals for the First Circuit
- In office June 3, 1939 – June 12, 1959
- Appointed by: Franklin D. Roosevelt
- Preceded by: George Hutchins Bingham
- Succeeded by: Bailey Aldrich

Personal details
- Born: Cecilius Calvert Magruder; December 26, 1893 Annapolis, Maryland, U.S.
- Died: May 22, 1968 (aged 74) Newton, Massachusetts, U.S.
- Education: St. John's College (AB, AM); Harvard University (LLB)

Cecilius Calvert Magruder (December 26, 1893 – May 22, 1968) was a United States circuit judge of the United States Court of Appeals for the First Circuit.

== Education and career ==
Magruder was born on December 26, 1893, in Annapolis, Maryland, the son of Rosalie Eugenia Stuart Webster and Daniel Randall Magruder, a member of the Maryland House of Delegates and a judge of the Maryland Court of Appeals. He received an Artium Baccalaureus degree in 1913 and an Artium Magister degree in 1917 from the Annapolis campus of St. John's College. He received a Bachelor of Laws in 1916 from Harvard Law School. He was a law clerk for Associate Justice Louis Brandeis of the Supreme Court of the United States from 1916 to 1917. He served as an infantry lieutenant in the United States Army from 1917 to 1919, during World War I. He was an attorney for the United States Shipping Board from 1919 to 1920. He was a faculty member of Harvard Law School from 1920 to 1939 and again from 1947 to 1959, as an assistant professor of law from 1920 to 1925, professor of law from 1925 to 1932, vice dean from 1930 to 1939 and as a lecturer from 1947 to 1959. He was general counsel for the National Labor Relations Board from 1934 to 1935. He was general counsel for the Wage and Hour Division of the United States Department of Labor from 1938 to 1939.

== Federal judicial service ==
Magruder was nominated by President Franklin D. Roosevelt on April 24, 1939, to a seat on the United States Court of Appeals for the First Circuit vacated by Judge George Hutchins Bingham. He was confirmed by the United States Senate on June 1, 1939, and received his commission on June 3, 1939. He served as a Judge of the Emergency Court of Appeals from 1942 to 1962. He served as Chief Judge from 1948 to 1959. He was a member of the Conference of Senior Circuit Judges (now the Judicial Conference of the United States) from 1940 to 1948, and a member of the Judicial Conference of the United States from 1948 to 1959. He assumed senior status on June 12, 1959. His service terminated on May 22, 1968, due to his death. He died at the age of 74 and was living in Newton, Massachusetts, at the time of his death.

=== Academic career ===
Magruder was a lecturer at the University of California, Hastings College of the Law from 1959 to 1960, Columbia University from 1960 to 1961, Ohio State University in 1961, and the University of Puerto Rico in 1962.

== See also ==
- List of law clerks for the fourth seat of the Supreme Court of the United States

== Sources ==
Legal offices
Preceded by George Hutchins Bingham	Judge of the United States Court of Appeals for the First Circuit; 1939–1959	Succeeded by Bailey Aldrich
Preceded by Office established	Chief Judge of the United States Court of Appeals for the First Circuit; 1948–1959	Succeeded by Peter Woodbury
