= David L. Barnes =

American judge

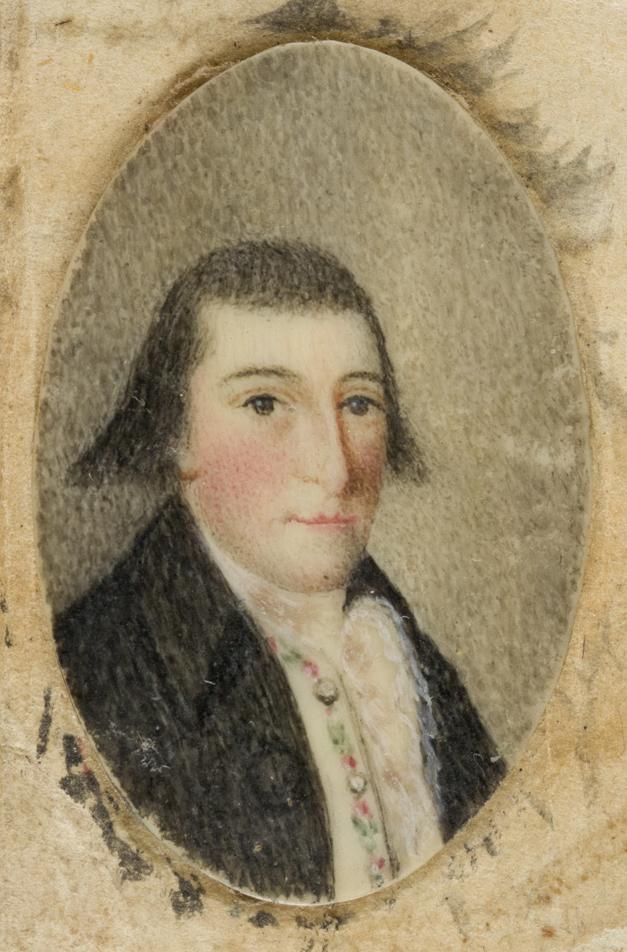
- A miniature portrait of Barnes (c. 1789)

Judge of the United States District Court for the District of Rhode Island
- In office April 30, 1801 – November 3, 1812
- Appointed by: Thomas Jefferson
- Preceded by: Benjamin Bourne
- Succeeded by: David Howell

Personal details
- Born: David Leonard Barnes; January 28, 1760 Scituate, Province of Massachusetts Bay, British America
- Died: November 3, 1812 (aged 52) Providence, Rhode Island, US
- Education: Harvard University read law

David Leonard Barnes (January 28, 1760 – November 3, 1812) was a United States district judge of the United States District Court for the District of Rhode Island and the winning party and the winning attorney in the first United States Supreme Court decision, West v. Barnes (1791).

== Education and career ==
Born on January 28, 1760, in Scituate, Province of Massachusetts Bay, British America, Barnes graduated from Harvard University in 1780 and read law in 1783. He entered private practice in Taunton, Massachusetts, from 1783 to 1793. He continued private practice in Providence, Rhode Island, from 1793 to 1802. He was United States Attorney for the District of Rhode Island from 1797 to 1801.

=== West v. Barnes ===
Barnes won the case of West v. Barnes (1791) representing himself and his wife's family after being admitted to the Supreme Court bar that morning.

== Federal judicial service ==
Barnes received a recess appointment from President Thomas Jefferson on April 30, 1801, to a seat on the United States District Court for the District of Rhode Island vacated by Judge Benjamin Bourne. He was nominated to the same position by President Jefferson on January 6, 1802. He was confirmed by the United States Senate on January 26, 1802, and received his commission the same day. His service terminated on November 3, 1812, due to his death in Providence.

== Sources ==
- James R. Perry, The Documentary History of the Supreme Court of the United States, 1789-1800, Volume 6, "West v. Barnes," pp. 7–27. Google Book Search excerpt
- Political Graveyard bio

Legal offices
Preceded by Benjamin Bourne	Judge of the United States District Court for the District of Rhode Island; 1801–1812	Succeeded by David Howell
