= John Pitman (judge) =

American judge (1785–1864)

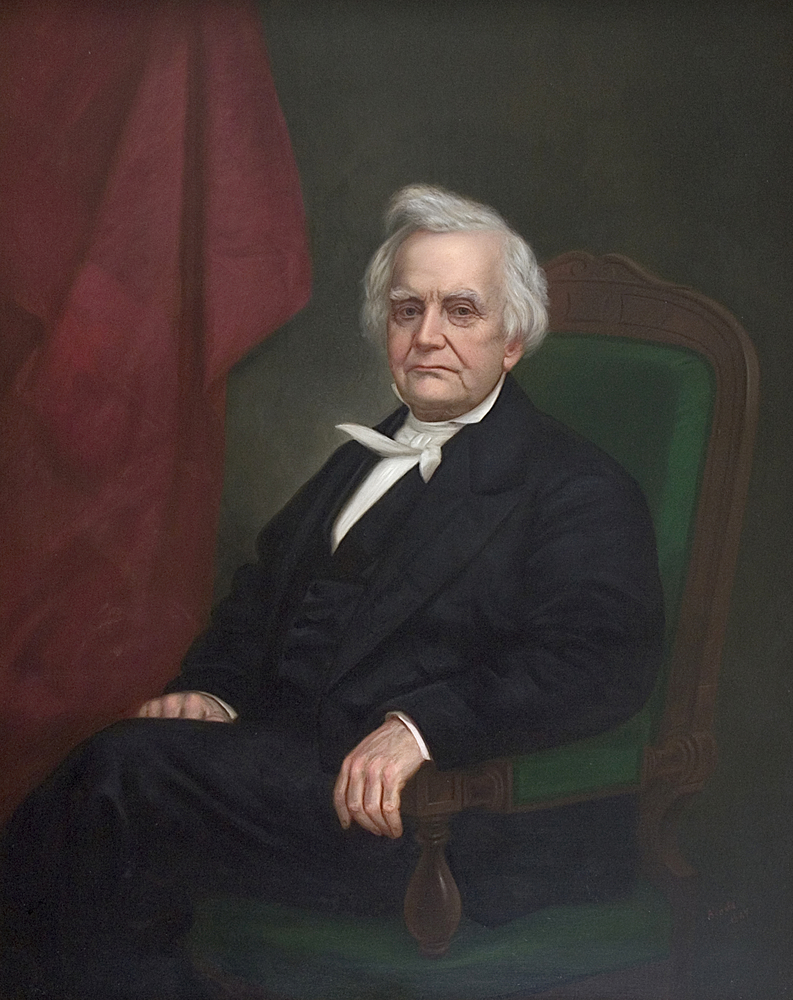
- John Pitman, painted by John Nelson Arnold

Judge of the United States District Court for the District of Rhode Island
- In office August 4, 1824 – November 17, 1864
- Appointed by: James Monroe
- Preceded by: David Howell
- Succeeded by: J. Russell Bullock

Personal details
- Born: John Pitman; February 23, 1785 Providence, Rhode Island
- Died: November 17, 1864 (aged 79) Providence, Rhode Island, U.S.
- Education: Brown University (A.B.) read law

John Pitman (February 23, 1785 – November 17, 1864) was a United States district judge of the United States District Court for the District of Rhode Island.

== Education and career ==
Born on February 23, 1785, in Providence, Rhode Island, Pitman received an Artium Baccalaureus degree in 1799 from Rhode Island College (now Brown University), read law in New Hampshire in 1805, and read law in New York in 1806. He entered private practice in New York City, New York from 1806 to 1807. He continued private practice in Kentucky from 1807 to 1808, in Providence from 1808 to 1812, and from 1820 to 1821, in Salem, Massachusetts from 1812 to 1816, and in Portsmouth, New Hampshire from 1816 to 1820. He was United States Attorney for the District of Rhode Island from 1821 to 1824.

== Federal judicial service ==
Pitman received a recess appointment from President James Monroe on August 4, 1824, to a seat on the United States District Court for the District of Rhode Island vacated by Judge David Howell. He was nominated to the same position by President Monroe on December 16, 1824. He was confirmed by the United States Senate on January 3, 1825, and received his commission the same day. His service terminated on November 17, 1864, due to his death in Providence.

== See also ==
- List of United States federal judges by longevity of service

== Sources ==
Legal offices
Preceded by David Howell	Judge of the United States District Court for the District of Rhode Island; 1824–1864	Succeeded by J. Russell Bullock
