= David Howell (jurist) =

American judge (1747–1824)

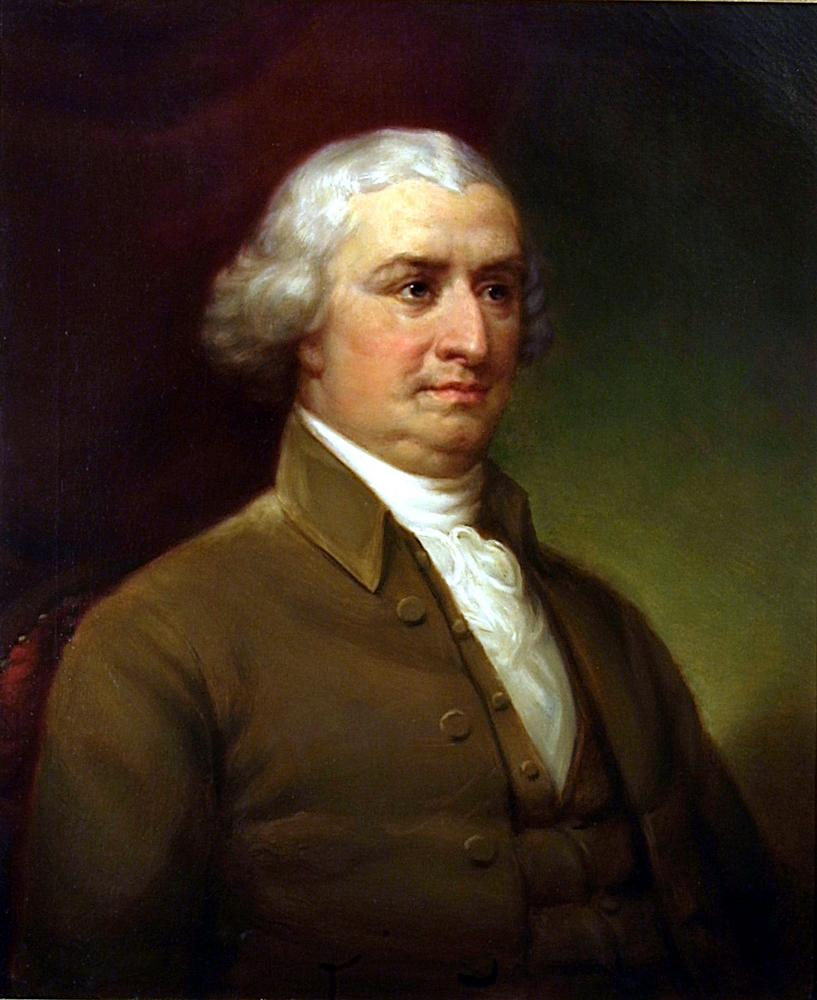
- David Howell painted by James Sullivan Lincoln

Judge of the United States District Court for the District of Rhode Island
- In office November 17, 1812 – July 30, 1824
- Appointed by: James Madison
- Preceded by: David L. Barnes
- Succeeded by: John Pitman

Attorney General of Rhode Island
- In office 1789
- Governor: John Collins
- Preceded by: Henry Goodwin
- Succeeded by: Daniel Berkeley Updike

Personal details
- Born: David Howell; January 1, 1747 Morristown, Province of New Jersey, British America
- Died: July 30, 1824 (aged 77) Providence, Rhode Island, U.S.
- Resting place: North Burial Ground; Providence, Rhode Island
- Children: Jeremiah B. Howell
- Education: Princeton University; Brown University (A.M.)

David Howell (January 1, 1747 – July 30, 1824) was a Delegate to the Congress of the Confederation from Rhode Island, an associate justice of the Supreme Court of Rhode Island, Attorney General of Rhode Island and a United States district judge of the United States District Court for the District of Rhode Island.

== Education and career ==
Born on January 1, 1747, in Morristown, Morris County, Province of New Jersey, British America, Howell attended Eaton's Academy in Hopewell, Province of New Jersey, then graduated from the College of New Jersey (now Princeton University) in 1766 and received an Artium Magister degree in 1769 from Rhode Island College (now Brown University). He was a Professor of Natural Philosophy at Brown University from 1766 to 1824, also serving as a fellow from 1773 to 1824, as Secretary from 1780 to 1806, and as Acting President from 1791 to 1792. He was in private practice in Providence, Colony of Rhode Island and Providence Plantations, British America (State of Rhode Island, United States from July 4, 1776) from 1768 to 1779, and from 1781 to 1782. He was a Justice of the Peace for Providence in 1779. He was a justice of the Rhode Island Court of Common Pleas for Providence County in 1780. He was a Delegate to the Congress of the Confederation (Continental Congress) from 1782 to 1785. He was an associate justice of the Supreme Court of Rhode Island from May 1786 to May 1787. He was Attorney General of Rhode Island in 1789. He was a boundary commissioner for the United States in New York City, New York in 1794.

=== Notable legal apprentice ===
Among the prospective attorneys who studied law with Howell was Asa Aldis, who later served as chief justice of the Vermont Supreme Court.

== Federal judicial service ==
Howell was nominated by President James Madison on November 12, 1812, to a seat on the United States District Court for the District of Rhode Island vacated by Judge David L. Barnes. He was confirmed by the United States Senate on November 16, 1812, and received his commission on November 17, 1812. His service terminated on July 30, 1824, due to his death in Providence. He was interred in North Burial Ground in Providence.

== Family ==
Howell was the father of Jeremiah B. Howell, a United States senator from Rhode Island.

== Sources ==
- United States Congress. "David Howell (id: H000859)". Biographical Directory of the United States Congress.
- David Howell at the Biographical Directory of Federal Judges, a publication of the Federal Judicial Center.

Legal offices
Preceded by Henry Goodwin	Attorney General of Rhode Island; 1789–1790	Succeeded by Daniel Berkeley Updike
Preceded by David L. Barnes	Judge of the United States District Court for the District of Rhode Island; 1812–1824	Succeeded by John Pitman
