= Joseph A. Smith Jr. =

Current editor-in-chief of the Journal of Urology

Doctor Joseph A. Smith Jr
- Education: University of Tennessee University of Utah Memorial Sloan-Kettering Cancer Center
- Known for: Urology, editor-in-chief of Journal of Urology
- Scientific career
- Fields: Urology
- Workplaces: Vanderbilt University
- Website: https://www.vumc.org/global-health/person/joseph-jay-smith-jr-md

Joseph A. Smith Jr is the former editor-in-chief of the Journal of Urology (2015-2021) and William L. Bray Professor in the Department of Urologic Surgery at Vanderbilt University in Nashville, Tennessee. He was the chair of the Department of Urology from 1991 to 2015. He has served as the President of American Board of Urology (2004–05) Southeastern Section, American Urologic Association and the Utah Urologic Society (1981–83).

== Early life ==
Smith completed his MD training at the University of Tennessee, Memphis, Tennessee, in 1974. Later, he underwent his surgical residency at the Parkland Memorial Hospital, University of Texas, Southwestern Medical School. In 1979, he completed his urology residency at University of Utah, Salt Lake City, Utah.
