= Ramon Guiteras =

American surgeon and urologist (1858–1917)

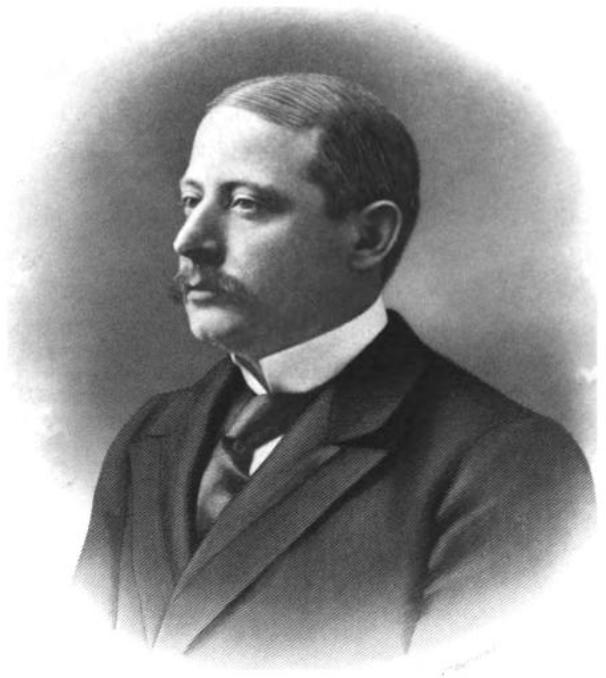
- Born: August 17, 1858; Bristol, Rhode Island
- Died: December 13, 1917 (aged 59); New York, New York
- Burial place: Juniper Hill Cemetery
- Education: Harvard College; Harvard Medical School
- Occupation: Surgeon
- Family: Juan Guiteras (cousin)

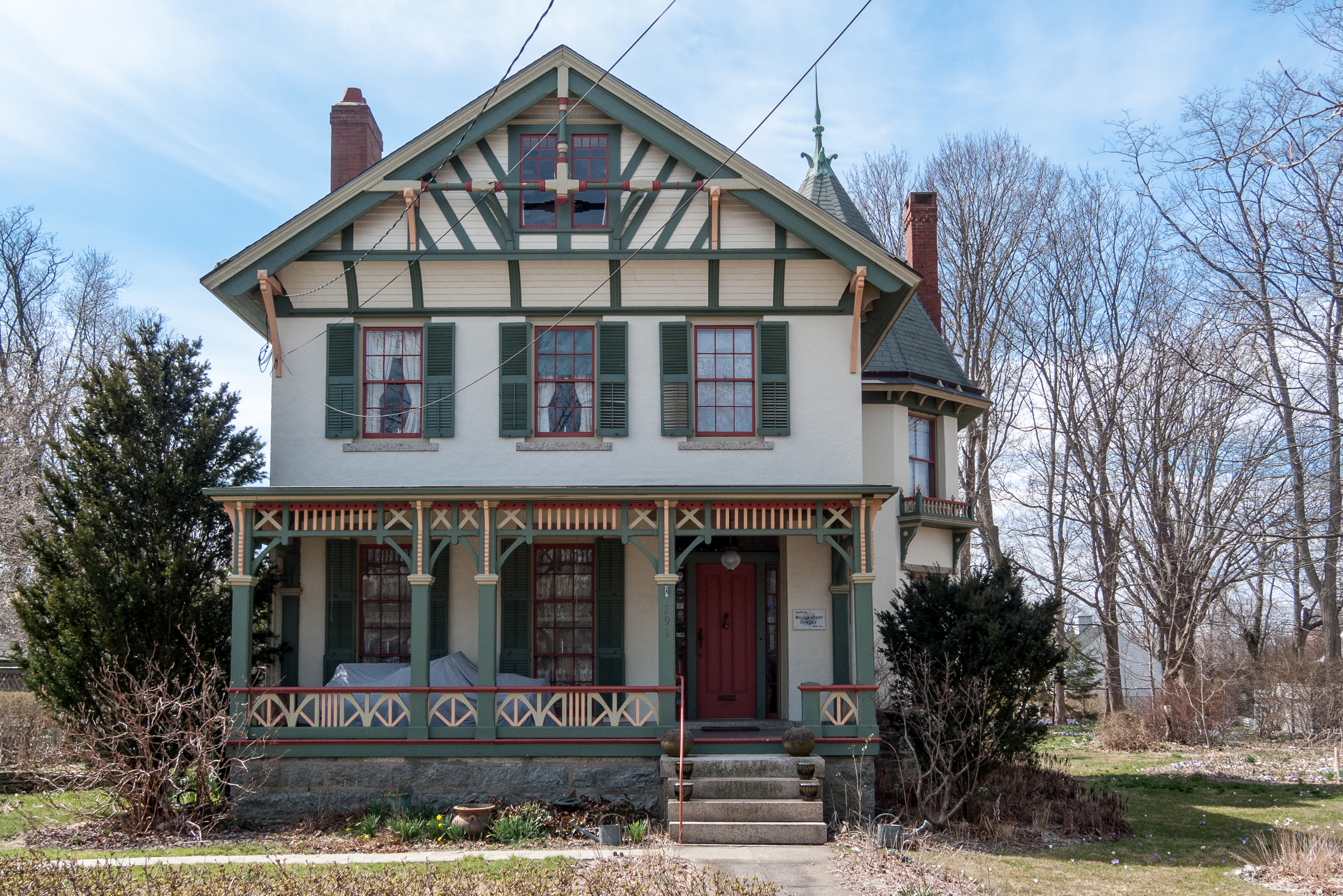
William H. DeWolf – Ramon Guiteras House, home to Guiteras after the Civil War in 1866

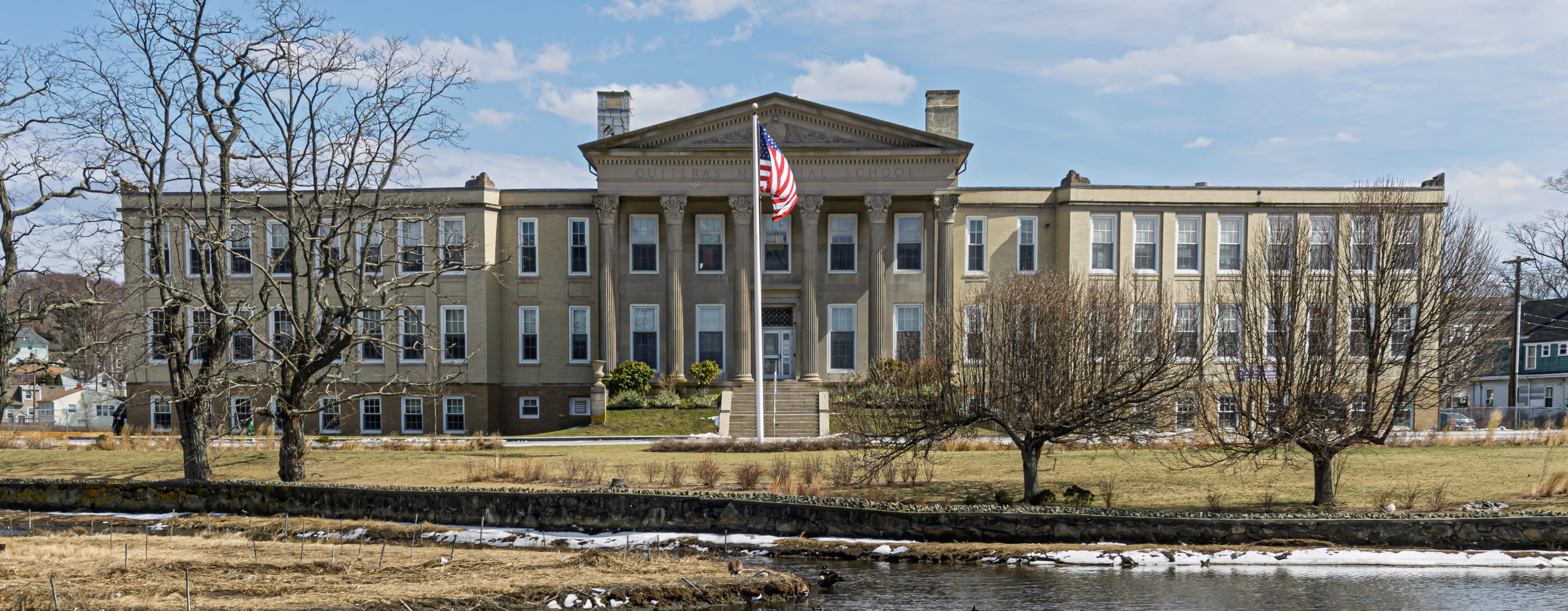
Guiteras Memorial School in Bristol; closed in 2025

Ramon Guiteras (August 17, 1858 – December 13, 1917) was a pioneering surgeon who specialized in urology and founded the American Urological Association.

== Early life and education ==
He was born in Bristol, Rhode Island, and graduated from Harvard College and Harvard Medical School. He was the cousin of Juan Guiteras, the noted Cuban doctor.

He became an officer in the United States Army National Guard, and served as the assistant surgeon for the Second Battery of Artillery, First Brigade of the New York Army National Guard, where he was promoted to first lieutenant on May 9, 1890. He was honorably discharged on July 26, 1893 as a captain. He also served 1881–1883 in the Boston Cadets.

== Death and legacy ==
Guiteras died in New York City on December 13, 1917. He is buried in Juniper Hill Cemetery in Bristol.

In his will he left $350,000 to build a school in Bristol to honor his mother. The resulting Guiteras Memorial School was designed by Wallis E. Howe in 1925, on Hope Street at Silver Creek. The Guiteras Memorial School closed in 2025 due to declining enrollment and maintenance costs.

The American Urological Association has an annual award named after him for the individual who is deemed to have made outstanding contributions to the art and science of urology.

Guiteras was inducted into the Rhode Island Heritage Hall of Fame in 2009.

== Publications ==
- Guiteras, Ramon (1912). Urology: The Diseases of the Urinary Tract in Men and Women, a Book for Practitioners and Students. New York: D. Appleton and Company. ISBN 9781461254768. OCLC 493821057. Volume 1 and Volume 2 (of two).
