= Bill Steers Men's 4-Miler =

Annual 4-mile race in Charlottesville, Virginia

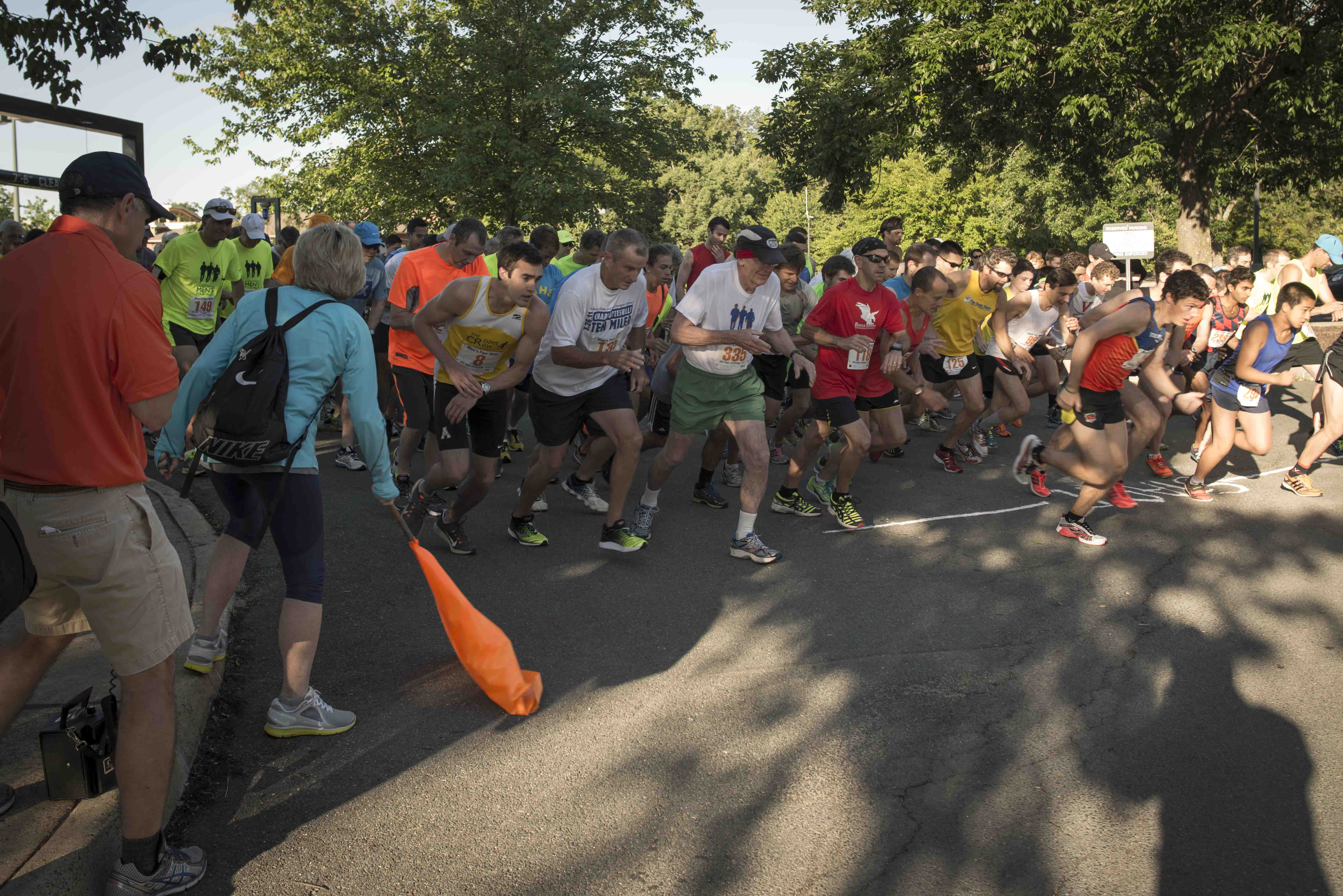
- Start Line, Scott Stadium, 2014
- Date: Memorial Day Weekend
- Location: Charlottesville, Virginia
- Event type: Road
- Distance: Four Miles
- Primary sponsor: Panera Bread, BMW, Starbucks, Pepsi, City of Charlottesville
- Established: 2004
- Course records: Though Keveren (18:54)
- Website: Men's Four Miler

The Bill Steers Men's 4-Miler (formerly Charlottesville Men's Four Miler) is the only all men's run in the Charlottesville area. The race was rededicated as a tribute to William D. Steers in 2015. It is an annual event hosted by the Charlottesville Track Club. The event has also been sponsored by Panera Bread, BMW of Charlottesville, Starbucks, Pepsi and the City of Charlottesville. The City of Charlottesville also hosts the Women's Four Miler to benefit the UVA Cancer Center Breast Care Program. The event, held continuously since 2004, was conceived by William D. Steers with the purpose of raising awareness on men's health issues; to encourage men to take control of their health, and become more physically active.

== Eligibility ==
The Bill Steers Men's 4-Miler is open to runners of all ages from all nations. Participants are not required to pre-qualify. Particular attention, and encouragement is given to men who are in need of physical activity, or out-of-shape. The focus of Charlottesville Men's Four Miler is to promote physical activity in sedentary males, and their immediate families.

== Training Program ==
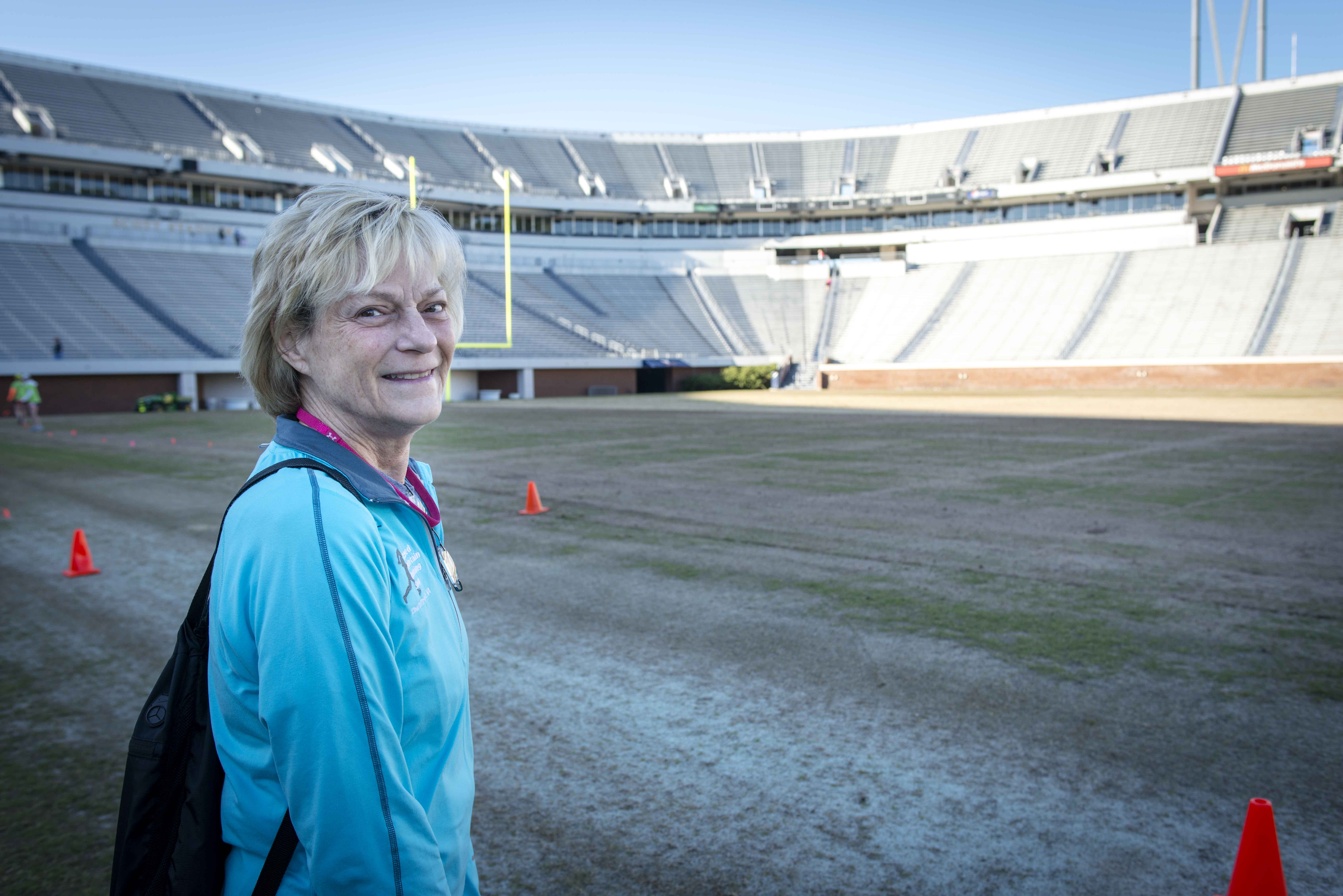
Women's Basketball Hall of Fame Class of 2008 Debbie Ryan at the finish Line (2014)

The Charlottesville Men's Four Miler Training Program meets as a group during the nine weeks preceding the race. The supervised program aims to assist runners to achieve successful completion of the foot race, and to encourage participants to engage in regular exercise as a part of an overall healthy lifestyle. Mark Lorenzoni has served as coach since the program started in 2004. The novice group starts training in two laps on the track, and eventually working up to the full four miles intended for the actual race.

== Course | 2014 ==
The Tenth Anniversary of the 'Charlottesville Men's Four Miler race was held on Saturday May 24, 2014. The starting line was at the west parking lot of Scott Stadium. The signal to start was flagged by former UVa Women's Basketball coach Debbie Ryan, inducted into the Women's Basketball Hall of Fame (add a link ?) in 2008. Runners quickly moved along Alderman Rd. towards McCormick Rd., Rugby Road and onto Grady Ave. The course continued to Cabell Ave., Burnley Ave., and Tunlaw Place. At Tunlaw Place participants turned left onto Rosser Ave. and then back to Rugby Rd., and McCormick Rd. In the intersection of McCormick and Alderman runners turned left, and then left again onto Whitehead Rd.. Finally, onto Stadium Rd., and the Scott Stadium tunnel, which leads into the field where the Finish Line was set up.

== List of Recent Winners ==
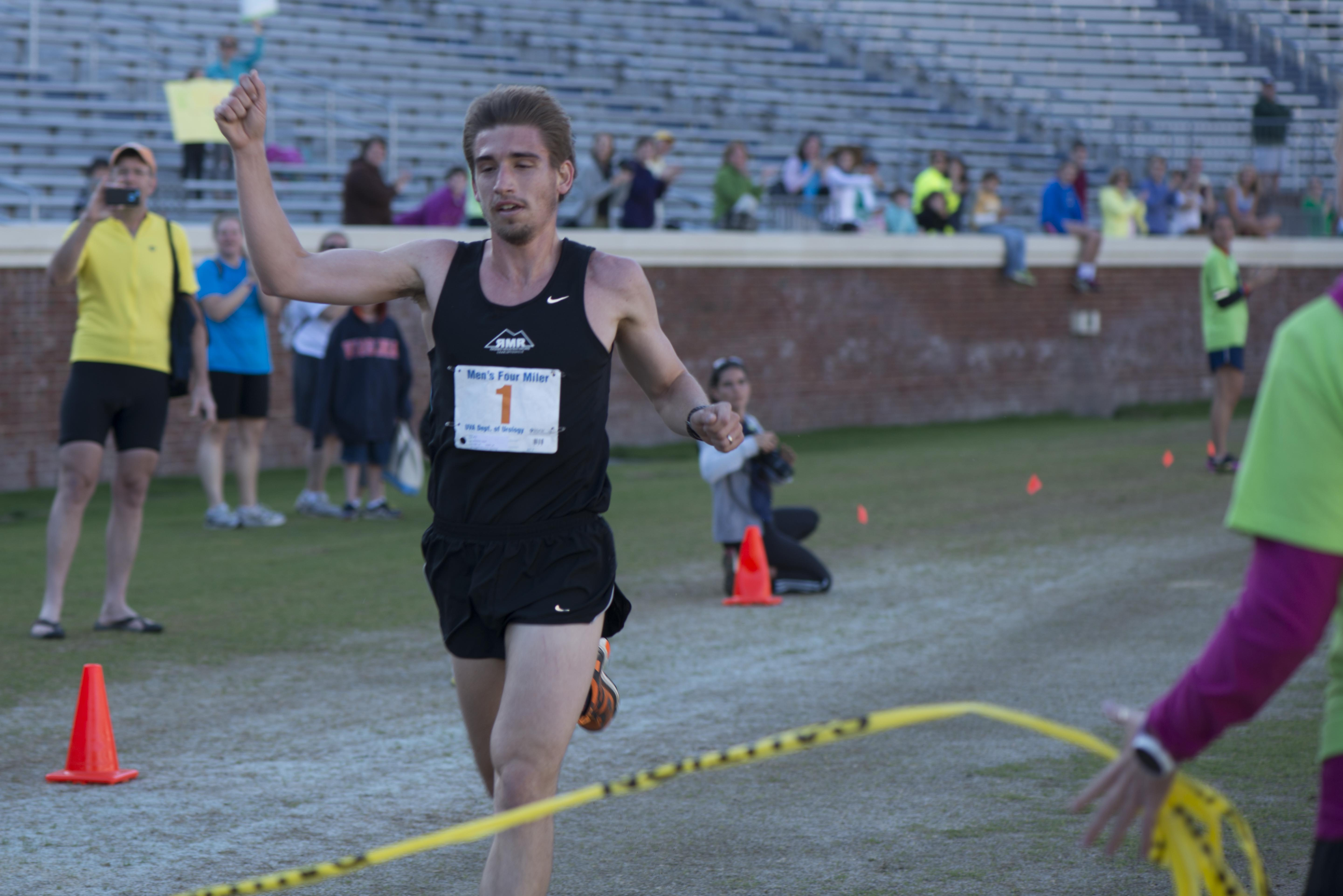
Sean Keveren, winner of 2014 Charlottesville Men's Four Mile Race, about to cross the finish line

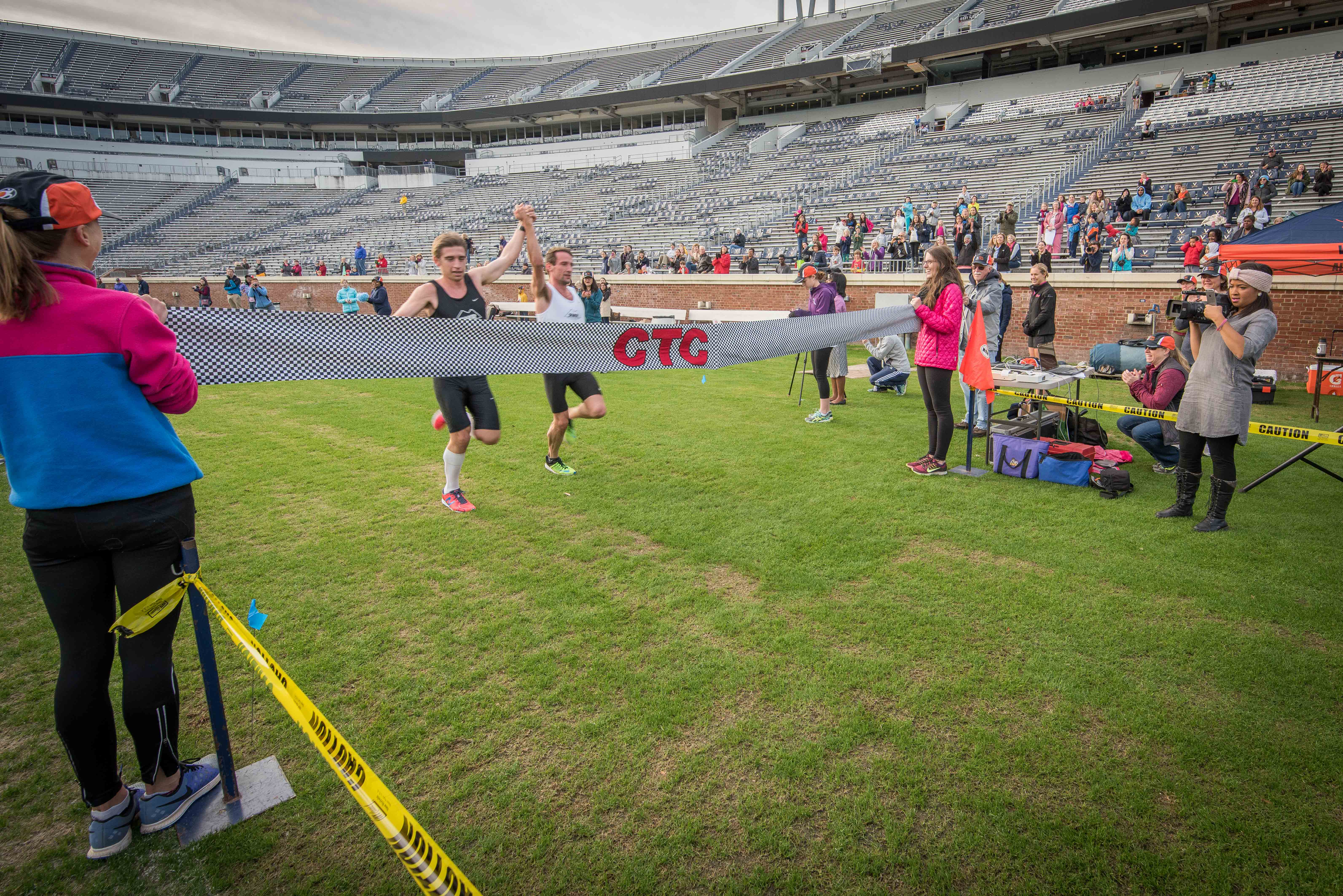
Sean Keveren and Brandon Lord as they approach the Finish Line on November 8th, 2015

First to Third Place | 2014 - 2012

| Race | Date | Place | Name | Age | Time | Team |
|---|---|---|---|---|---|---|
| 2015 | Nov 08 | 1st | Sean Keveren | 25 | 19:27 | Ragged Mountain Racing |
| 2015 | Nov 08 | 1st | Brandon Lord | 23 | 19:27 | Ragged Mountain Racing |
| 2014 | May 24 | 1st | Sean Keveren | 23 | 18:54 | Ragged Mountain Racing |
| 2014 | May 24 | 2nd | Thomas Adam | 27 | 19:55 | Ragged Mountain Racing |
| 2014 | May 24 | 3rd | Charlie Hurt | 31 | 20:56 | Ragged Mountain Racing |
| 2013 | June 16 | 1st | Seth Hutchinson | 29 | 19:51 | |
| 2013 | June 16 | 2nd | Robert Thiele | 34 | 20:08 | |
| 2013 | June 16 | 3rd | Thomas Adam | 26 | 20:55 | |
| 2012 | June 17 | 1st | Bill Palmer | 35 | 20:29 | |
| 2012 | June 17 | 2nd | Alec Lorenzoni | 27 | 20:30 | Ragged Mountain Racing |
| 2012 | June 17 | 3rd | Nathaniel Hermsmeier | 19 | 20:42 | Hermsmeier |

== Photo and video stories ==
- 2014 Men's Four Miler Slideshow
- Facebook Photo Album
