= Benjamin Bourne =

American judge (1755–1808)

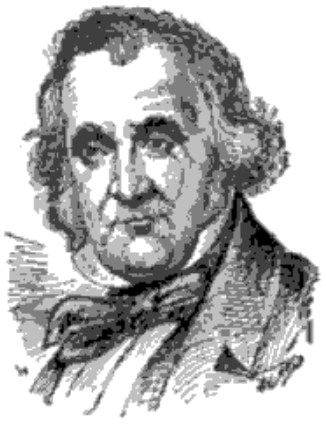

Judge of the United States Circuit Court for the First Circuit
- In office February 20, 1801 – July 1, 1802
- Appointed by: John Adams
- Preceded by: Seat established by 2 Stat. 89
- Succeeded by: Seat abolished

Judge of the United States District Court for the District of Rhode Island
- In office October 13, 1796 – February 20, 1801
- Appointed by: George Washington
- Preceded by: Henry Marchant
- Succeeded by: David L. Barnes

Member of the U.S. House of Representatives from Rhode Island's at-large district
- In office August 31, 1790 – October 13, 1796
- Preceded by: Seat established
- Succeeded by: Elisha Reynolds Potter

Personal details
- Born: September 9, 1755 Bristol, Rhode Island Colony, British America
- Died: September 17, 1808 (aged 53) Bristol, Rhode Island, U.S.
- Resting place: Juniper Hill Cemetery; Bristol, Rhode Island
- Party: Federalist
- Relatives: Shearjashub Bourne
- Education: Harvard University (M.A.) read law

Benjamin Bourne (September 9, 1755 – September 17, 1808) was a United States representative from Rhode Island, a United States district judge of the United States District Court for the District of Rhode Island and a United States Circuit Judge of the United States Circuit Court for the First Circuit.

== Education and career ==
Born on September 9, 1755, in Bristol in the Colony of Rhode Island and Providence Plantations. Bourne was the son of Shearjashub Bourn, a lawyer who eventually served on the Rhode Island Supreme Court. Like his father, Bourne graduated from Harvard University in 1775, received a Master of Arts degree from the same institution in 1778, and read law. He was quartermaster of the Second Rhode Island Regiment in 1776. He was admitted to the bar and commenced practice in Providence, Rhode Island. He was a deputy in the Rhode Island General Assembly in 1780 and from 1787 to 1790. He was clerk of the Rhode Island General Assembly from 1780 to 1786. He was a Justice of the Peace in Providence from 1785 to 1790.

== Congressional service ==
Upon the ratification of the United States Constitution by the State of Rhode Island, Bourne was elected as a Pro-Administration candidate from Rhode Island's at-large congressional district to the United States House of Representatives of the 1st through the 3rd United States Congresses and as a Federalist to the 4th and 5th United States Congresses and served from August 31, 1790, until his resignation on October 13, 1796, before the close of the 4th United States Congress.

== Federal judicial service ==
Bourne received a recess appointment from President George Washington on October 13, 1796, to a seat on the United States District Court for the District of Rhode Island vacated by Judge Henry Marchant. He was nominated to the same position by President Washington on December 21, 1796. He was confirmed by the United States Senate on December 22, 1796, and received his commission the same day. His service terminated on February 20, 1801, due to his elevation to the First Circuit.

Bourne was nominated by President John Adams on February 18, 1801, to the United States Circuit Court for the First Circuit, to a new seat authorized by 2 Stat. 89. He was confirmed by the Senate on February 20, 1801, and received his commission the same day. His service terminated on July 1, 1802, due to abolition of the court.

== Later service and death ==
Following his departure from the federal bench, Bourne resumed private practice in Providence and Bristol from 1801 to 1808. He died on September 17, 1808, in Bristol. He was interred in Juniper Hill Cemetery in Bristol.

== Family ==
Bourne was a first cousin once removed of Massachusetts United States Representative Shearjashub Bourne.

U.S. House of Representatives
Preceded by Seat established	United States Representative from Rhode Island's at-large congressional district 1790–1796	Succeeded by Elisha Reynolds Potter
Legal offices
Preceded by Henry Marchant	Judge of the United States District Court for the District of Rhode Island; 1796–1801	Succeeded by David L. Barnes
Preceded by Seat established by 2 Stat. 89	Judge of the United States Circuit Court for the First Circuit; 1801–1802	Succeeded by Seat abolished
