= General Bullock =

General Bullock may refer to:

- George Bullock (British Army officer) (1851–1926), British Army lieutenant general
- Robert Bullock (1828–1905), Confederate States Army brigadier general

== See also ==
- Attorney General Bullock (disambiguation)
