= Justice Bingham =

Justice Bingham may refer to:

- Edward Franklin Bingham (1828–1907), chief justice of the Supreme Court of the District of Columbia
- Tom Bingham, Baron Bingham of Cornhill (1933–2010), Lord Chief Justice of England and Wales

== See also ==
- Judge Bingham (disambiguation)
