= Department of Urology, University of Virginia =

Coordinates: 38.0238°N 78.5265°W

Department of Urology
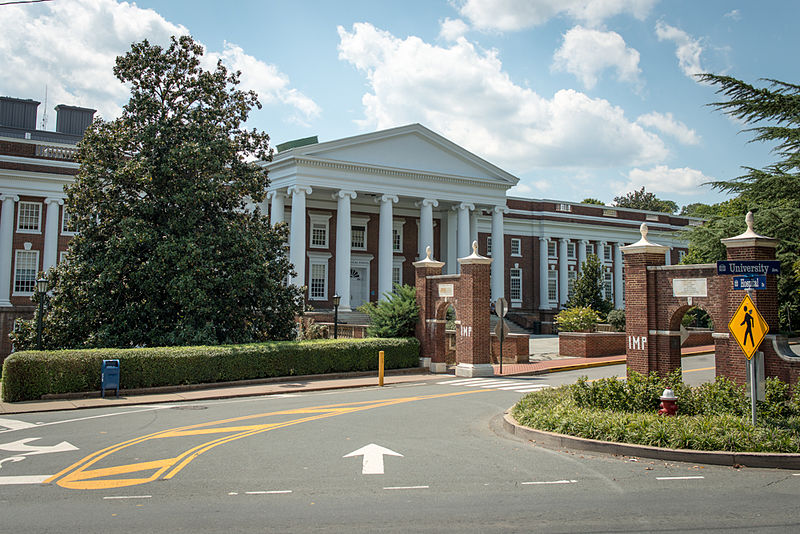
- Type: University Hospital
- Established: 1920s
- Founders: John Henry Neff, Jr.
- Chairperson: Kirsten L. Greene
- Location: Charlottesville, Virginia, U.S.
- Website: www.medicine.virginia.edu/clinical/departments/urology/home-page

The department of urology is one of 21 clinical departments at The University of Virginia School of Medicine in Charlottesville, Virginia. The department of urology operates from the University of Virginia Grounds, adjacent to the historic Academical Village, and from the UVA Medical Center Fontaine Research Park, 500 Ray C. Hunt Drive. The current chair of the department of urology is Kirsten Greene, MD, MS, FACS. The department of urology of the University of Virginia has been distinguished by U.S. News & World Report among the Best Hospitals in adult and pediatric urology.

== History ==
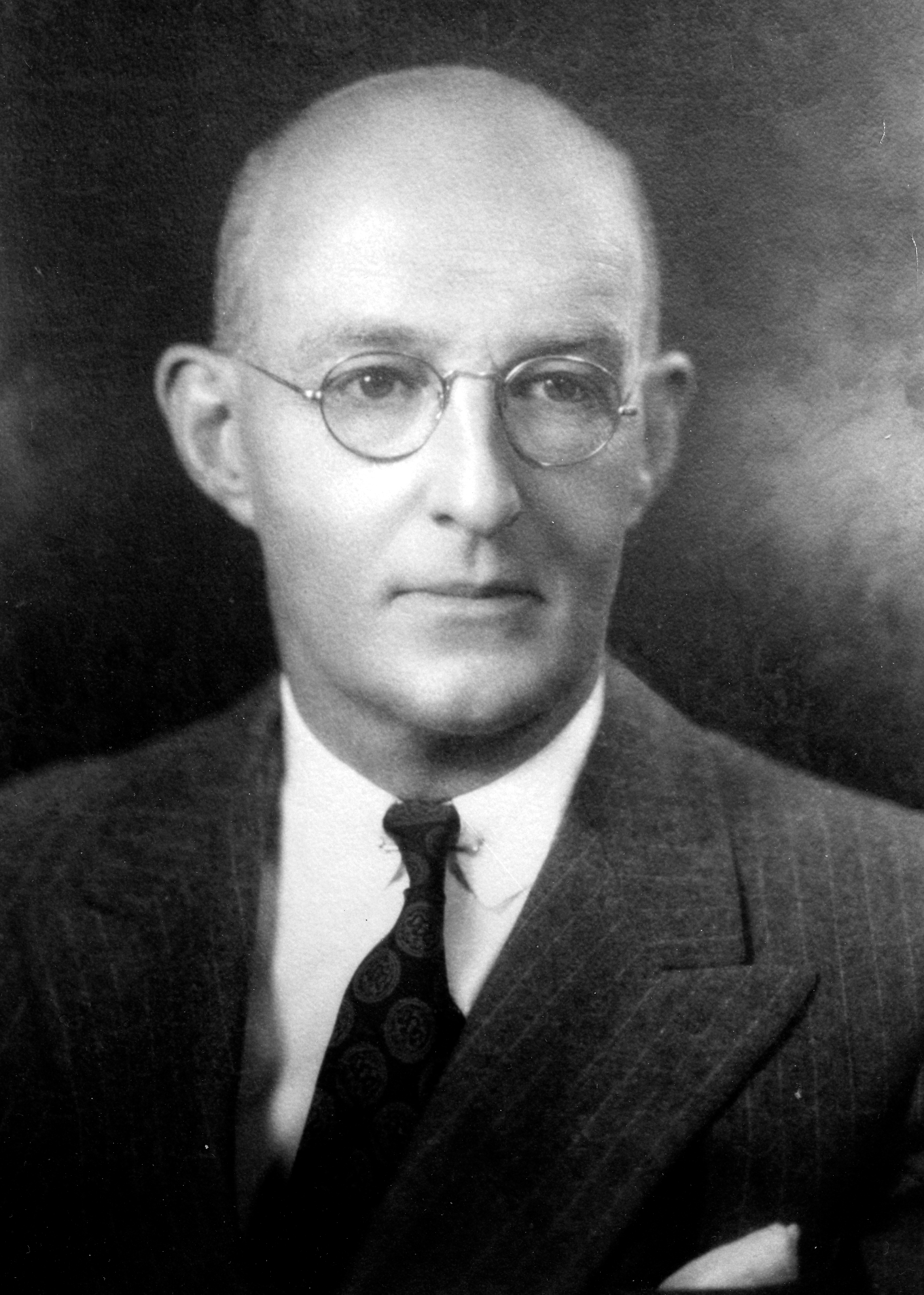
Dr. Neff

Almost one hundred years after the establishment of the school of medicine by Thomas Jefferson, it became evident and necessary to detach what was then known as genito-urinary practices from the general surgery and set it up as a separate service. Dr John Henry Neff, Jr. (1887–1938), a specialist in genitourinary and rectal diseases, became the first head of what would become the department of urology.

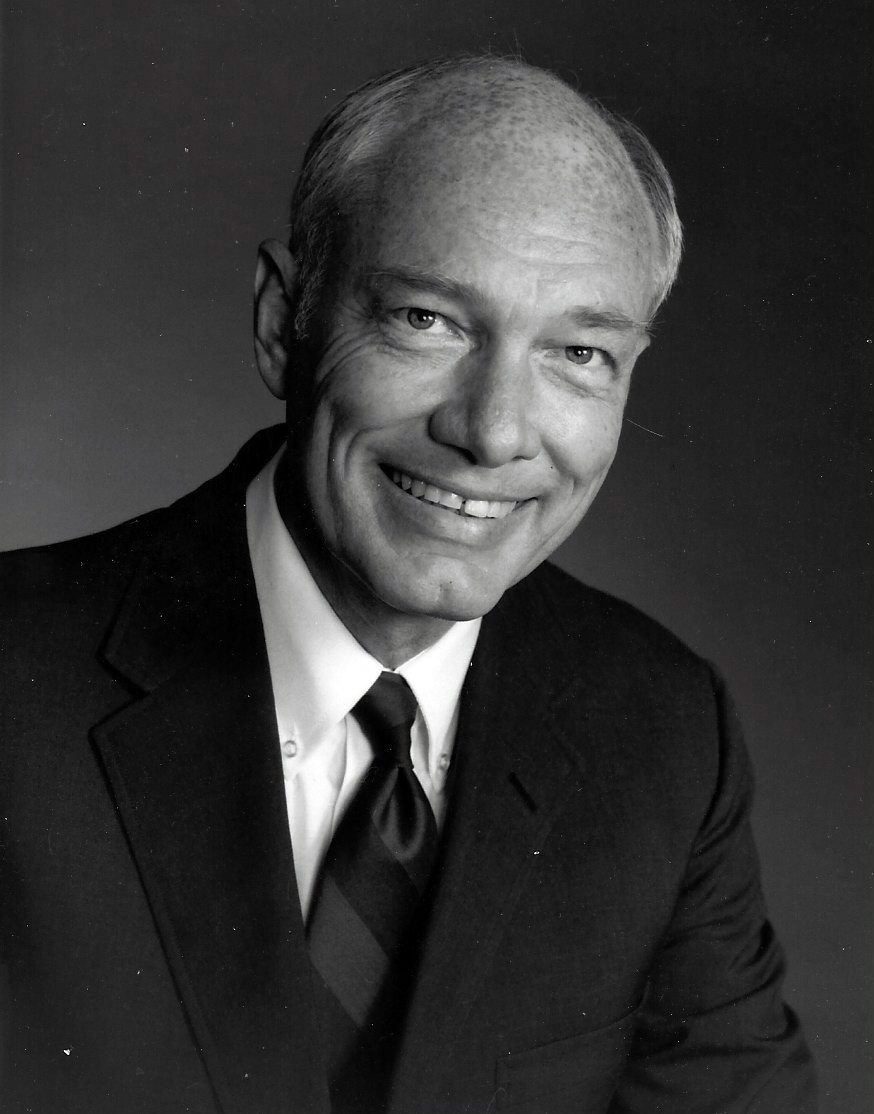
Dr. Gillenwater

The first examining rooms of the pioneer practice were located on the ground floor along the corridor of the Steele Wing of the school of medicine at UVA. During the initial years, the practice was substantially identified with the treatment of patients and scientific research. New procedures were developed under the supervision of Dr. Neff, who was also credited with being the first surgeon in Charlottesville to use spinal anaesthesia.

Dr. Neff, Jr. died on November 8, 1938. His funeral was held at the University of Virginia chapel on the following day. Faculty members, headed by President John L. Newcomb, were honorary pallbearers. Burial was at the University Cemetery His former assistant, Dr. Edgar Kirby, succeeded Dr. Neff as acting chairman of urology. In 1941, Dr. Samuel A. Vest (1905–1958), was appointed associate professor of urology and director of the department of urology, filling the vacancy initially created by the death of Dr. Neff. Dr. Vest was born in Haw River, on January 21, 1905. He was a graduate of Duke University and received his medical degree from Johns Hopkins University Medical School. Dr. Vest died of a heart attack at the University of Virginia Hospital on April 6, 1958. He was succeeded in the chair by Dr. Albert J. Paquin, Jr. (1921–1967). Dr. Paquin. Jr. was born on February 22, 1921, in Prescott Arizona and died on March 13, 1967, in Charlottesville, Virginia. As a surgeon, Dr. Paquin was principally interested in the reconstructive technics used to correct congenital defects of the kidney and the bladder. He was succeeded by Jay Y. Gillenwater whom at age 34 became the youngest chairman of the urology department the same year. He was succeeded by Dr. William D. Steers in 1994. Dr. William Steers died in 2015 and was succeeded by Dr. Raymond Costabile, MD. Dr. Kirsten Greene became chair in 2019. Dr. Raymond A. Costabile.

== Past chair and emeritus faculty ==
Name	Other	Division	Clinical practice
Marguerite Lippert, MD	Emeritus professor	General urology	Urologic oncology, clinical trials
Stuart Howards, MD	Emeritus professor of urology, molecular physiology & biological physics	General urology	Pediatric urology, microsurgery, infertility
William D. Steers, MD	Past chair 1994-2015	General urology	General urology, Surgeon.
Jay Y. Gillenwater, MD	Past chair, & emeritus professor 1967-1994	General urology	General urology, surgeon.
Edgar Kirby, MD	Past chair	General urology	General urology.
Samuel A. Vest, MD	Past chair	General urology	General urology.
John Henry Neff, MD	Inaugural chair	General urology	General urology.

== Clinical and research faculty ==
Name	Other	Division	Clinical practice
Kirsten L. Greene, MD, MAS, FACS	Chair	Urologic oncology	Genitourinary malignancies, surgical oncology, robotic surgery
Tracey Krupski, MD	Vice-chair	Urologic oncology	Incontinence, genitourinary malignancies, surgical oncology
Raymond Costabile, MD	Past chair	Reconstruction & andrology	Male infertility, vasectomy, vasectomy reversal, sexual dysfunction, erectile dysfunction
Stephen Culp, MD, PhD	Assistant professor	Urologic oncology	Translational urologic oncology
Noah Schenkman, MD	Associate professor	Endo-urology	Kidney stones, endourology, genitourinary malignancies, minimally invasive surgery, benign prostate conditions, cryosurgery
Sean Corbett, MD.	Associate professor	Pediatric urology	
Nora L. Kern, MD.	Assistant professor	Pediatric urology	Genetic basis of congenital genitourinary disease states, robotic surgery
Jeffrey Lysiak, PhD	Assistant professor	Research	
Alan Jenkins, MD	Associate professor	Endo-urology & kidney stones	Kidney stones, endourology, urolithiasis
Ryan Smith, MD	Assistant professor	Andrology and infertility	Male infertility, male reproductive physiology, vasectomy, vasectomy reversal, sexual dysfunction, microsurgery, erectile dysfunction.
Sumit Isharwal, MD	Assistant professor	Urologic oncology	Prostate cancer, bladder cancer, kidney cancer, and testicular cancer.
David E. Rapp, MD	Associate professor	Neuro-urology & female reconstruction	Female pelvic medicine & reconstructive surgery.
Mikel Gray, PhD	Nurse practitioner	Urodynamics	Neurological urology voiding dysfunction, urinary incontinence, neurogenic bladder, interstitial cystitis
Terran W. Sims, NP	Nurse practitioner	GU oncology, medical oncology	
Kathie L. Hullfish, MD	Associate professor	Uro-gynecology and pelvic medicine	
Elisa R. Trowbridge, MD	Associate professor	Uro-gynecology and pelvic medicine	

=== External links ===
- Official Facebook page
- School of Medicine home page
