= LeBaron B. Colt =

American judge (1846–1924)

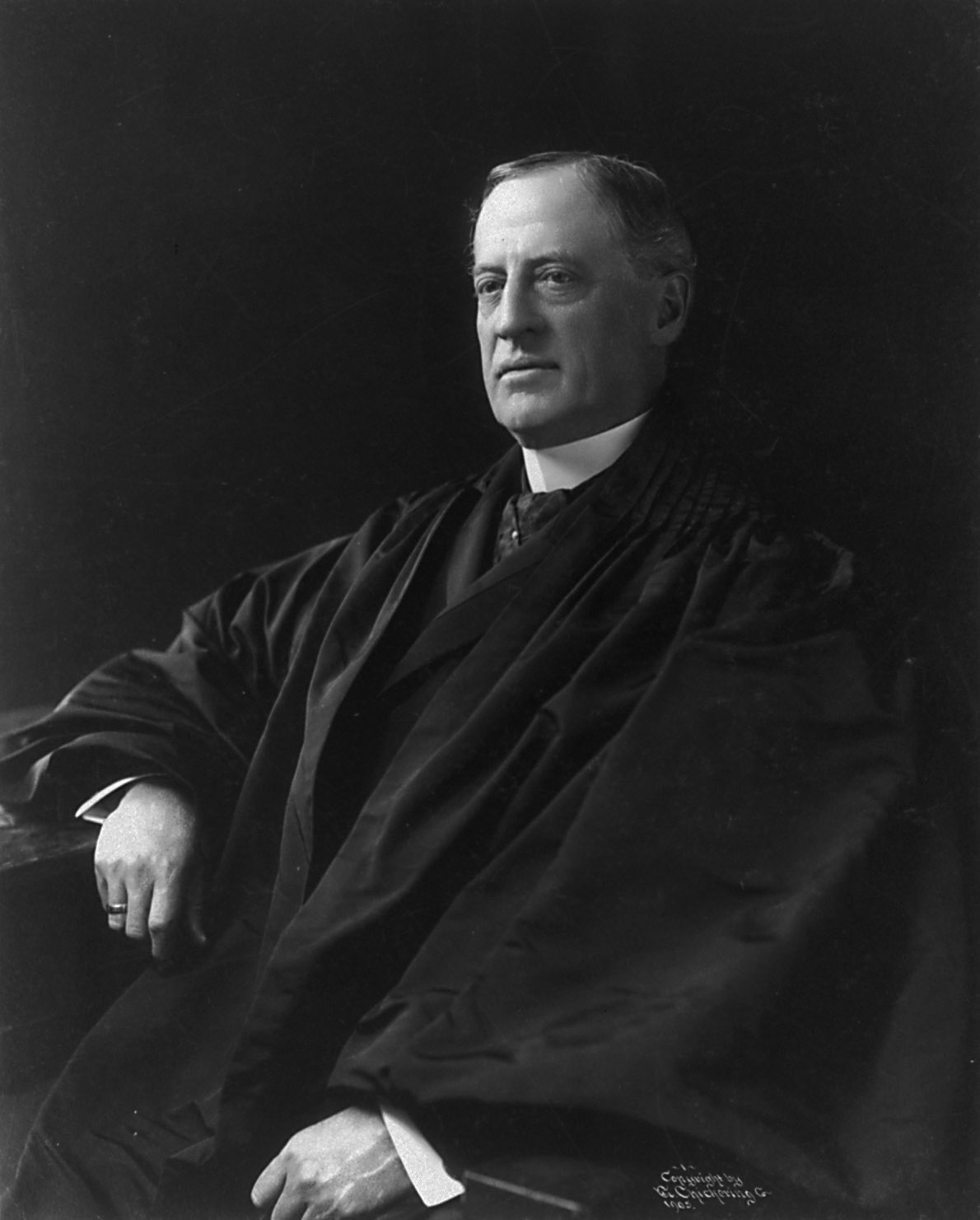

United States Senator from Rhode Island
- In office March 4, 1913 – August 18, 1924
- Preceded by: George P. Wetmore
- Succeeded by: Jesse H. Metcalf

Judge of the United States Court of Appeals for the First Circuit
- In office June 16, 1891 – February 7, 1913
- Appointed by: operation of law
- Preceded by: Seat established by 26 Stat. 826
- Succeeded by: George Hutchins Bingham

Judge of the United States Circuit Courts for the First Circuit
- In office July 5, 1884 – December 31, 1911
- Appointed by: Chester A. Arthur
- Preceded by: John Lowell
- Succeeded by: Seat abolished

Judge of the United States District Court for the District of Rhode Island
- In office March 21, 1881 – July 23, 1884
- Appointed by: James A. Garfield
- Preceded by: John Power Knowles
- Succeeded by: George Moulton Carpenter Jr.

Member of the Rhode Island House of Representatives
- In office 1879-1881

Personal details
- Born: LeBaron Bradford Colt; June 25, 1846 Dedham, Massachusetts, U.S.
- Died: August 18, 1924 (aged 78) Bristol, Rhode Island, U.S.
- Resting place: Juniper Hill Cemetery; Bristol, Rhode Island
- Party: Republican
- Relatives: Samuel Colt; Samuel P. Colt
- Education: Yale University (AB); Columbia Law School (LLB)

LeBaron Bradford Colt (June 25, 1846 – August 18, 1924) was a United States senator from Rhode Island and a United States circuit judge of the United States Court of Appeals for the First Circuit and of the United States Circuit Courts for the First Circuit and previously was a United States district judge of the United States District Court for the District of Rhode Island.

== Education and career ==
Born on June 25, 1846, in Dedham, Massachusetts, Colt attended the public schools and Williston Seminary. He received an Artium Baccalaureus degree in 1868 from Yale University and a Bachelor of Laws in 1870 from Columbia Law School. At Yale, Colt was a member of Skull and Bones. Following graduation, he devoted a year to European travel. He entered private practice in Chicago, Illinois from 1871 to 1875. He continued private practice in Bristol, Rhode Island from 1875 to 1879. He was a member of the Rhode Island House of Representatives from 1879 to 1881.

== Federal judicial service ==
Colt was nominated by President James A. Garfield on March 9, 1881, to a seat on the United States District Court for the District of Rhode Island vacated by Judge John Power Knowles. He was confirmed by the United States Senate on March 21, 1881, and received his commission the same day. His service terminated on July 23, 1884, due to his elevation to the First Circuit.

Colt was nominated by President Chester A. Arthur on July 2, 1884, to a seat on the United States Circuit Courts for the First Circuit vacated by Judge John Lowell. He was confirmed by the Senate on July 5, 1884, and received his commission the same day. Colt was assigned by operation of law to additional and concurrent service on the United States Court of Appeals for the First Circuit on June 16, 1891, to a new seat authorized by 26 Stat. 826 (Evarts Act). On December 31, 1911, the Circuit Courts were abolished and he thereafter served only on the Court of Appeals. His service terminated on February 7, 1913, due to his resignation.

== Congressional service ==
Colt was elected in 1913 as a Republican to the United States Senate. He was reelected in 1919 and served from March 4, 1913, until his death in Bristol on August 18, 1924. He was Chairman of the Committee on Conservation of Natural Resources for the 65th United States Congress and Chairman of the Committee on Immigration for the 66th through 68th United States Congresses. He voted against the Immigration Act of 1924 and supported women's suffrage.

He was interred in Juniper Hill Cemetery in Bristol.

== Family ==
Colt was the son of Christopher Colt (the brother of arms maker Samuel Colt) and Theodora Goujand DeWolf Colt; his younger brother, Samuel P. Colt, was a prominent Rhode Island businessman and politician.

== See also ==
- List of members of the United States Congress who died in office (1900–1949)

Legal offices
Preceded by John Power Knowles	Judge of the United States District Court for the District of Rhode Island; 1881–1884	Succeeded by George Moulton Carpenter Jr.
Preceded by John Lowell	Judge of the United States Circuit Courts for the First Circuit; 1884–1911	Succeeded by Seat abolished
Preceded by Seat established by 26 Stat. 826	Judge of the United States Court of Appeals for the First Circuit; 1891–1913	Succeeded by George Hutchins Bingham
U.S. Senate
Preceded by George P. Wetmore	United States Senator (Class 2) from Rhode Island; 1913–1924; Served alongside: Henry F. Lippitt, Peter G. Gerry	Succeeded by Jesse H. Metcalf
Preceded by Ellison D. Smith	Chairman of the Senate Conservation Committee; 1919–1921	Succeeded by Office abolished
Preceded by Thomas W. Hardwick	Chairman of the Senate Immigration Committee; 1919–1924	Succeeded by Hiram Johnson
Party political offices
Preceded by Direct election established	Republican nominee for United States Senator from Rhode Island (Class 2); 1918	Succeeded by Jesse H. Metcalf
