= John Power Knowles =

American judge

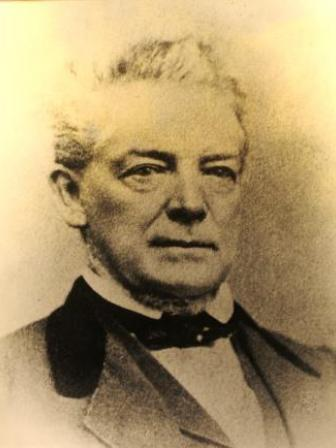

Judge of the United States District Court for the District of Rhode Island
- In office October 9, 1869 – March 21, 1881
- Appointed by: Ulysses S. Grant
- Preceded by: J. Russell Bullock
- Succeeded by: LeBaron Bradford Colt

Personal details
- Born: John Power Knowles; June 13, 1808 Providence, Rhode Island, U.S.
- Died: August 3, 1887 (aged 79) Providence, Rhode Island, U.S.
- Education: Brown University (A.B.); Harvard Law School (LL.B.)

John Power Knowles (June 13, 1808 – August 3, 1887) was a United States district judge of the United States District Court for the District of Rhode Island.

== Education and career ==
Born in Providence, Rhode Island, Knowles received an Artium Baccalaureus degree from Brown University in 1836 and a Bachelor of Laws from Harvard Law School in 1838. He was in private practice in Providence from 1838 to 1855, and was a member of the Rhode Island General Assembly in 1855. He was a court reporter in Providence from 1855 to 1857, and then returned to private practice there until 1865, when he again took up work as a court reporter for a year. He was returned to the Rhode Island General Assembly in 1866, and was a city solicitor in Providence from 1866 to 1867, thereafter making a final return to private practice until 1869.

== Federal judicial service ==
Knowles received a recess appointment from President Ulysses S. Grant on October 9, 1869, to a seat on the United States District Court for the District of Rhode Island vacated by Judge J. Russell Bullock. He was nominated to the same position by President Grant on December 6, 1869. He was confirmed by the United States Senate on January 24, 1870, and received his commission the same day. His service terminated on March 21, 1881, due to his retirement.

== Death ==
Knowles died on August 3, 1887, in Providence.

== Sources ==
Legal offices
Preceded by J. Russell Bullock	Judge of the United States District Court for the District of Rhode Island; 1869–1881	Succeeded by LeBaron Bradford Colt
