= Jay Y. Gillenwater =

American urologist

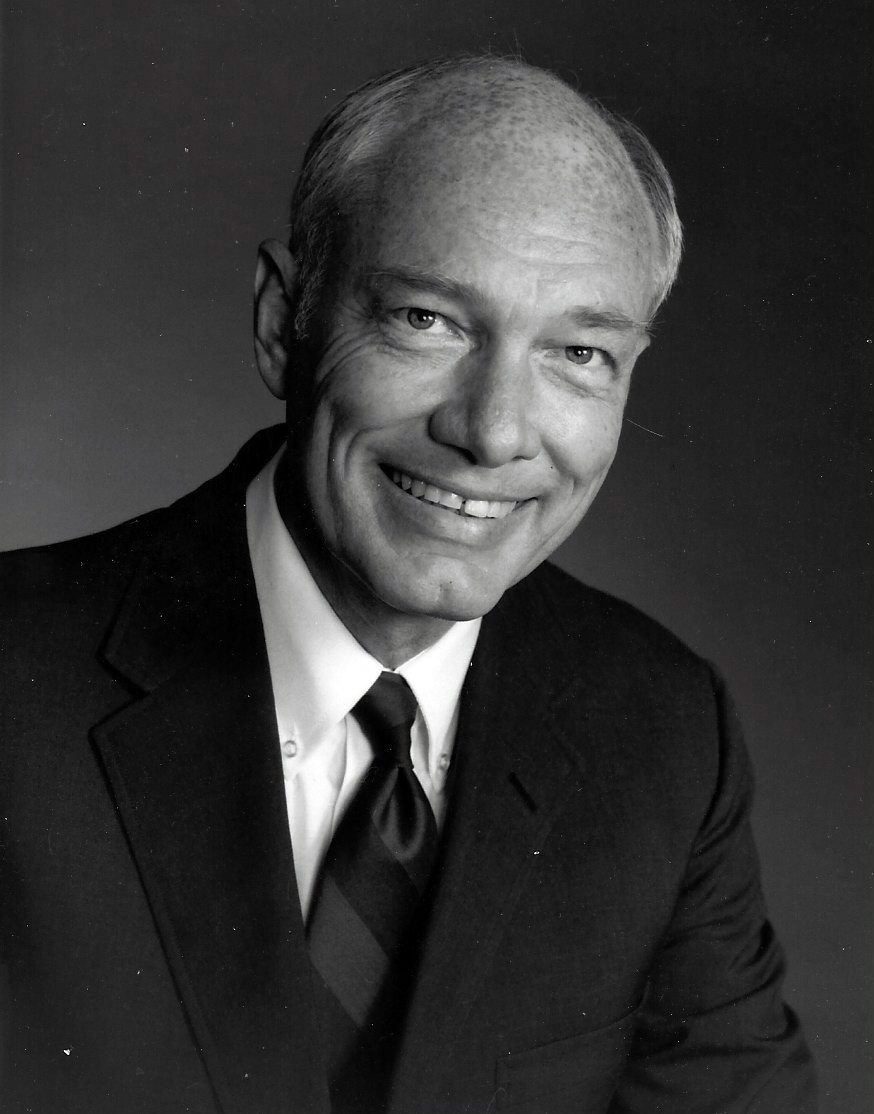
- Jay Y. Gillenwater
- Born: July 27, 1933 (age 93); Kingsport, Tennessee, U.S.
- Education: University of Tennessee
- Awards: Russell and Mary Scott Award, Hugh Hampton Young Award, Valentine Medal.
- Scientific career
- Fields: Urology
- Workplaces: University of Virginia, American Board of Urology, Journal of Urology

Jay Y. Gillenwater (born July 27, 1933 in Kingsport) is professor emeritus at the University of Virginia. He is former chair of the Department of Urology at the School of Medicine of the University of Virginia, was president of the American Urological Association, editor of the Journal of Urology, member of the NIH Advisory Council of Diabetes, Digestive, and Kidney Diseases, and president of the American Foundation for Urologic Diseases. He is the author of Adult and Pediatric Urology.

== Education and military service ==
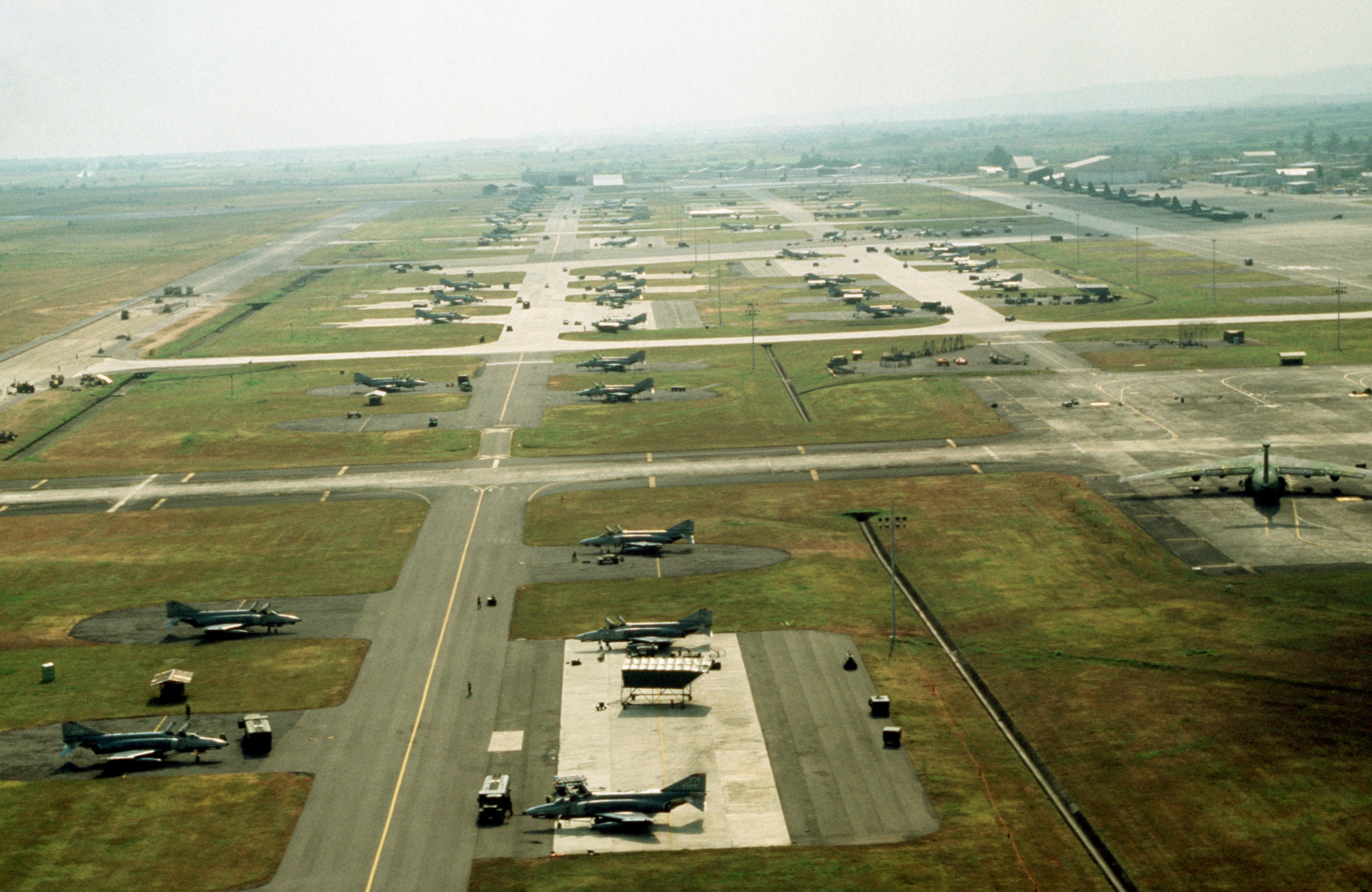
Clark Air Base, Manila

Gillenwater obtained his B.S. from the University of Tennessee in 1954 and his M.D. from The University of Tennessee (College of Medicine in Memphis) in 1957. He was a house officer in internal medicine at the Graduate Hospital of the University of Pennsylvania from January 1958 to June 1960. In 1961 Gillenwater joined the Army during the experimental phase of the U.S. Army Research Institute of Environmental Medicine He was first stationed in Fort Knox where he was assigned to the Armored Medical Research Laboratory, he was then deployed to Clark Air Base in Manila where he worked on research leading to asset the impact of prolonged exposure to extreme heat, particularly in soldiers deeply to tank and armored vehicle units. Upon competition of his Military Service Gillenwater completed his residency in urology at the Hospital of the University of Pennsylvania in 1965.

== Career ==
In 1965, Gillenwater became assistant professor in the Department of Urology at the University of Virginia. Two years later, at age 37, he was appointed professor and chairman of the department. During his tenure as chairman, Gillenwater made headline news when he introduced the lithotripter for the treatment of kidney stones without surgery in America. Gillenwater with the support of Hovey Dabney, was responsible for the creation of University of Virginia Health Sciences Foundation, with a significant institutional impact enabling innovation and discovery for clinical practitioners and scientists. Upon retirement in 2003.

== Societies and memberships ==
Gillenwater was trustee and examiner for the American Board of Urology, president of the American Board of Urology (1987-1988), president of the American Urological Association from (1991-1992), and chairman of the Education Committee and of the Research Committee of the American Urological Association. He served on the National Institutes of Health Advisory Council of Diabetes, Digestive, and Kidney Diseases, and is currently president of the American Foundation for Urologic Diseases. He was editor the Year Book of Urology, associate editor of the Journal of Urology, and editor of Investigative Urology, he also served on the editorial board of Urology and the American Journal of Kidney Diseases.

Gillenwater married Shirley Brockman, also from Kingsport, in 1955, and they have three children Linda, Ann and Jay Merritt. He is the co-author of the textbook “Adult and Pediatric Urology”.

== Awards ==
Gillenwater is an internationally recognized and awarded academic. He is recipient of the Russell and Mary Scott Award by the American Urological Association, the Annual Chicago Urological Society, the Charles C. Higgins Visiting Professorship from the Department of Urology at The Cleveland Clinic Foundation in 1988, the 1994 Distinguished Alumnus Award by The University of Tennessee College of Medicine Alumni Association, the Ramon Guitars Award by the American Urological Association, 1999, the Hugh Hampton Young Award for the study of urologic diseases, The Presidential Founders Award, 2004 by The American Foundation for Urologic Disease, and the Valentine Medal.

== Publications ==
- John T. Grayhack; Stuart S. Howards; Michael E. Mitchell (2001). Jay Y. Gillenwater (ed.). Adult and Pediatric Urology (3-Volume Set) (4th ed.). Philadelphia: Lippincott Williams & Wilkins. 1089 pages. ISBN 978-0781732208.

== On film ==
- "The Gillenwater Story" by Heritage Film Project, directed by Eduardo Montes-Bradley. Premiered in Charlottesville on December 23, 2017. HD, 30 minutes.
