= George Hutchins Bingham =

American judge (1864–1949)

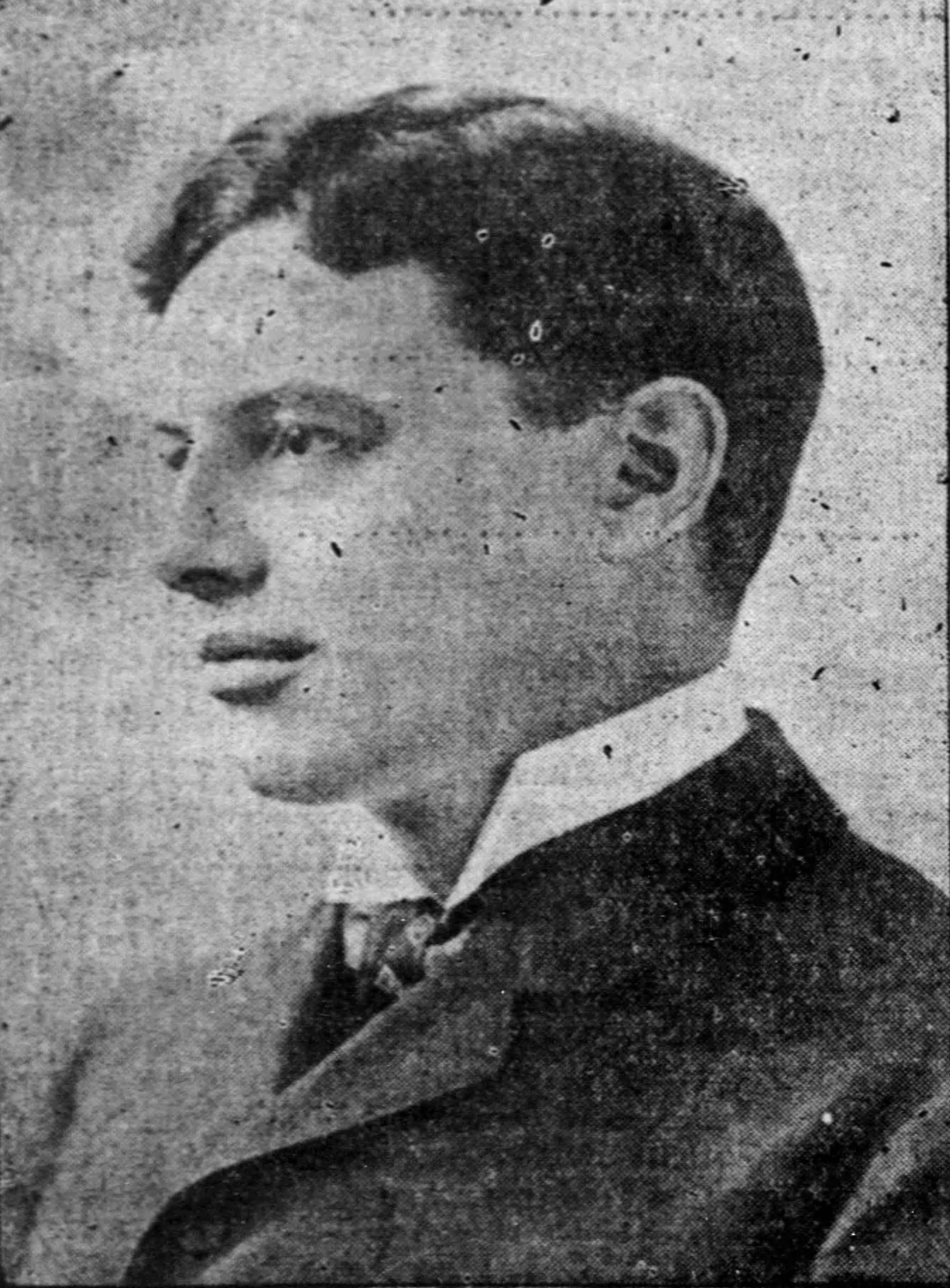

Senior Judge of the United States Court of Appeals for the First Circuit
- In office March 23, 1939 – September 25, 1949

Judge of the United States Court of Appeals for the First Circuit
- In office June 5, 1913 – March 23, 1939
- Appointed by: Woodrow Wilson
- Preceded by: LeBaron Bradford Colt
- Succeeded by: Calvert Magruder

Personal details
- Born: George Hutchins Bingham; August 19, 1864 Littleton, New Hampshire, U.S.
- Died: September 25, 1949 (aged 85) Manchester, New Hampshire, U.S.
- Education: Dartmouth College (AB); Harvard Law School (LLB)

George Hutchins Bingham (August 19, 1864 – September 25, 1949) was a United States circuit judge of the United States Court of Appeals for the First Circuit.

== Education and career ==
Born on August 19, 1864, in Littleton, New Hampshire, Bingham received an Artium Baccalaureus degree in 1887 from Dartmouth College and a Bachelor of Laws in 1891 from Harvard Law School. He entered private practice in Littleton and Manchester, New Hampshire from 1891 to 1902. He was a Justice of the Supreme Court of New Hampshire from 1902 to 1913.

== Federal judicial service ==
Bingham was nominated by President Woodrow Wilson on May 15, 1913, to a seat on the United States Court of Appeals for the First Circuit vacated by Judge LeBaron Bradford Colt. He was confirmed by the United States Senate on June 5, 1913, and received his commission the same day. He was a member of the Conference of Senior Circuit Judges (now the Judicial Conference of the United States) from 1922 to 1938. In 1933, he also served as president of the New Hampshire Bar Association. He assumed senior status on March 23, 1939. His service terminated on September 25, 1949, due to his death in Manchester.

== Sources ==
Legal offices
Preceded by LeBaron Bradford Colt	Judge of the United States Court of Appeals for the First Circuit; 1913–1939	Succeeded by Calvert Magruder
