= William Didusch =

Scientific illustrator

William P. Didusch
- Born: 1895; Baltimore, Maryland, United States
- Died: 1981 (aged 85–86)
- Occupation: Scientific illustration
- Employer: American Urological Association

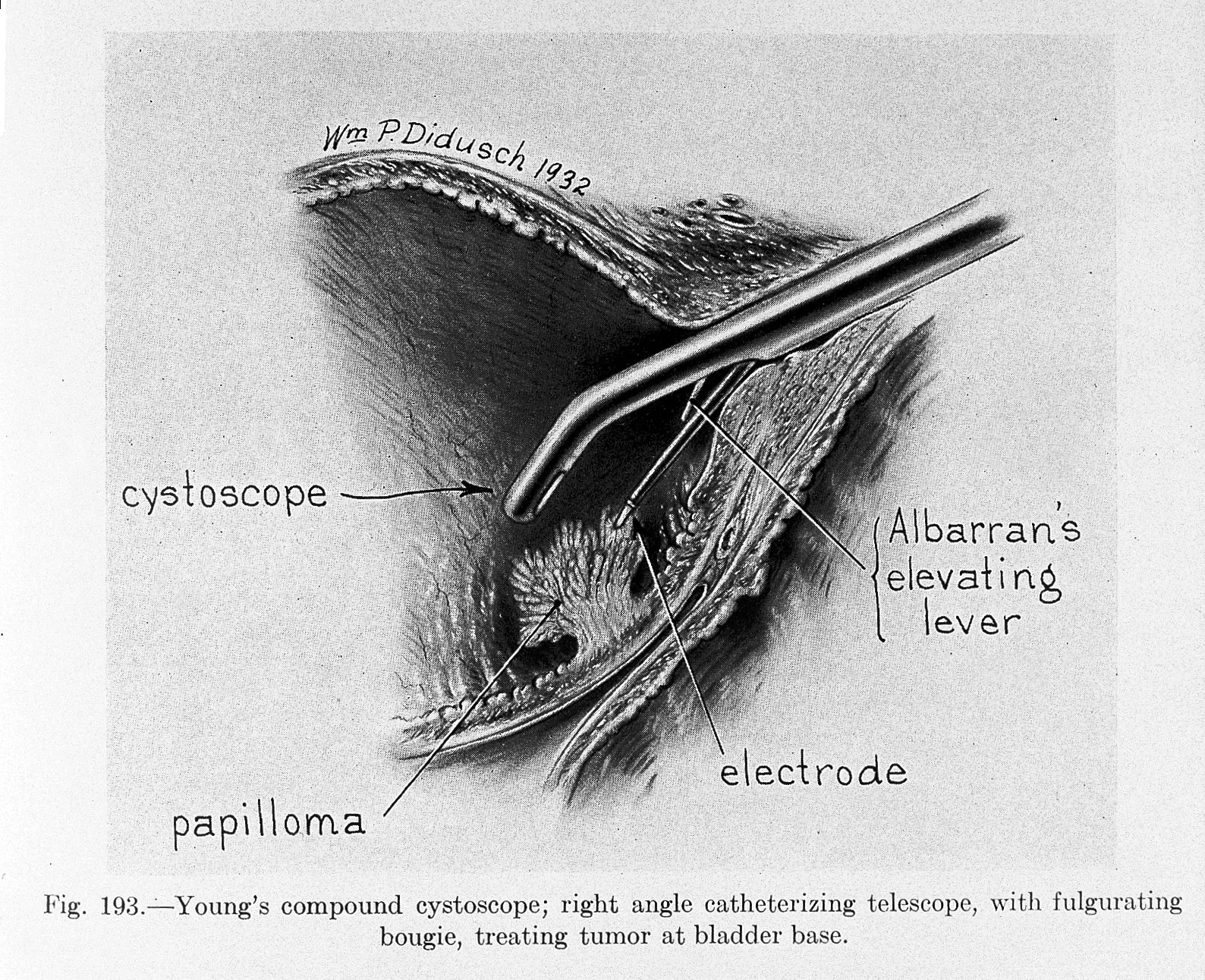
A 1932 drawing by Didusch

William P. Didusch (1895-1981) was a scientific illustrator known for his work for the American Urological Association.
