= The Journal of Urology =

- Discipline: Urology
- Language: English
- Edited by: D. Robert Siemens

Publication details
- Former names: Transactions of the American Urological Association; Investigative Urology; Urological Survey
- History: 1917–present
- Publisher: Wolters Kluwer
- Frequency: Monthly
- Impact factor: 10.6 (2025)

Standard abbreviations
- ISO 4: J. Urol.

Indexing
- CODEN: JOURAA
- ISSN: 0022-5347 (print); 1527-3792 (web)
- OCLC no.: 01754854

Links
- Journal homepage; Online access

The Journal of Urology is a peer-reviewed medical journal covering urology published by Wolters Kluwer on behalf of the American Urological Association. It was established in 1917. A special centenary issue was released in 2017 to celebrate 100 years of the publication of the journal.

Over the years, it absorbed the Transactions of the American Urological Association (1907–1920), as well as Investigative Urology (1963–1981) and Urological Survey (1951–1981). Urological Survey was known as Quarterly Review of Urology from 1946 to 1950.

== Editors ==
The following persons have been editor-in-chief of the journal:

- Hugh H. Young (1917–1945)
- J. A. Campbell Colston (1946–1965)
- Hugh J. Jewett (1966–1977)
- William W. Scott (1977–1983)
- Herbert Brendler (1983–1985)
- John T. Grayhack (1985–1994)
- Jay Y. Gillenwater (1994–2004)
- William D. Steers (2007–2015)
- Joseph A. Smith, Jr. (2015-2021)
- D. Robert Siemens (2022-present)

== Abstracting and indexing ==
The journal is abstracted and indexed in Science Citation Index Expanded, Scopus, PASCAL, BIOSIS, CAB Abstracts, Gender Studies Database, and Veterinary Science Database.
