= J. Russell Bullock =

American judge (1815–1899)

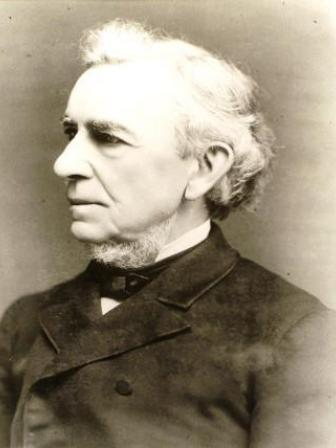

Judge of the United States District Court for the District of Rhode Island
- In office February 11, 1865 – September 15, 1869
- Appointed by: Abraham Lincoln
- Preceded by: John Pitman
- Succeeded by: John Power Knowles

Personal details
- Born: Jonathan Russell Bullock; September 6, 1815 Bristol, Rhode Island, U.S.
- Died: May 7, 1899 (aged 83) Bristol, Rhode Island, U.S.
- Education: Brown University read law

Jonathan Russell Bullock (September 6, 1815 – May 7, 1899) was a justice of the Supreme Court of Rhode Island and a United States district judge of the United States District Court for the District of Rhode Island.

== Education and career ==
Born in Bristol, Rhode Island on September 6, 1815, Bullock graduated from Brown University in 1834 and read law to enter the bar in 1836. He was in private practice in Alton, Illinois from 1836 to 1843, and served on the Alton Common Council. He was in private practice in Bristol from 1843 to 1849, serving as a member of the Rhode Island House of Representatives from 1844 to 1846. He was the Attorney General of Rhode Island in 1849. He was collector of customs in Bristol and Warren, Rhode Island from 1849 to 1853, then served in the Rhode Island Senate in 1859 before becoming Lieutenant Governor of Rhode Island in 1860 under Governor William Sprague IV. After briefly serving as a special commissioner to adjust accounts between Rhode Island and the Government of the United States, he served as a justice of the Rhode Island Supreme Court from September 7, 1862 until his resignation on March 1, 1864.

== Federal judicial service ==
On February 9, 1865, Bullock was nominated by President Abraham Lincoln to a seat on the United States District Court for the District of Rhode Island vacated by Judge John Pitman. Bullock was confirmed by the United States Senate on February 11, 1865, and received his commission the same day. Bullock served in that capacity until his resignation on September 15, 1869.

== Death ==
Bullock died on May 7, 1899, in Bristol.

== Sources ==
Political offices
| Preceded by Isaac Saunderd | Lieutenant Governor of Rhode Island; 1860–1861 | Succeeded by Seth Padelford |
Legal offices
| Preceded by John Pitman | Judge of the United States District Court for the District of Rhode Island; 1865–1869 | Succeeded by John Power Knowles |
