= American Urological Association =

- Abbreviation: AUA
- Formation: 1902
- Purpose: To promote the highest standards of urological clinical care through education, research and in the formulation of health care policy.
- Headquarters: Linthicum, Maryland
- Location: United States
- Members: 23,000+
- President: Edward M. Messing, MD, FACS
- Website: www.auanet.org

The American Urological Association (AUA) is a professional association in the United States for urology professionals. It has its headquarters at the William P. Didusch Center for Urologic History in Maryland.

AUA works with many international organizations, representing urologists from across the world. These groups offer full or half day sessions, covering a variety of topics, during the annual meeting.

== Awards ==
- Hugh Hampton Young Award: Presented annually to an individual for outstanding contributions to the study of genitourinary tract disease. This award is sponsored by Karl Storz Endoscopy-America, Inc.
- Ramon Guiteras Award: Awarded annually to an individual who is deemed to have made outstanding contributions to the art and science of urology. This award is sponsored by Bard Urological Division.
- Distinguished Contribution Award: Presented annually to individuals who have made outstanding contributions to the science and practice of urology, including contributions made in a sub-specialty area, for military career service, or for humanitarian efforts.

== Publications ==
The AUA publishes The Journal of Urology.

== See also ==
- William Didusch
