= List of Georgetown University Law Center alumni =

The Georgetown University Law Center is the law school of Georgetown University in the Capitol Hill district of Washington, D.C. Established in 1870, it is the second largest law school in the United States and receives more full-time applications than any other law school in the country.

The oldest Jesuit law school in the United States, Georgetown Law is one of the "T14" law schools, that is, schools that have consistently ranked within the top 14 law schools since U.S. News & World Report began publishing rankings. Although it has notably produced many prominent public officials, the school's alumni have entered a diverse array of fields and legal disciplines.

== Academia ==
- Evelyn Aswad, J.D. 1995, chair in International Law at the University of Oklahoma College of Law
- Ian C. Ballon, LL.M. 1988, professor of Law at Stanford University
- Johanna Bond, LL.M., dean of Rutgers Law School
- Robert J. Cottrol, 1984, professor of Law at George Washington University Law School
- Tim Canova, 1988, professor of Law at Nova Southeastern University Law School
- Mitch Daniels, 1979, president of Purdue University (2013–present) and governor of Indiana (2005–2013)
- Nora Demleitner, LL.M. 1994, president of St. John's College - Annapolis, dean of the Washington and Lee University School of Law, and dean of Maurice A. Deane School of Law
- Noura Erakat, LL.M. 2012, professor of law at George Mason University School of Law
- Allison Garrett, LL.M 1992, chancellor of Oklahoma State Regents for Higher Education (2021–2024); former president of Emporia State University (2016–2021); former Walmart vice president/legal counsel
- Maura R. Grossman, 1999, research professor in the David R. Cheriton School of Computer Science at the University of Waterloo and adjunct professor at Osgoode Hall Law School of York University
- Jim Lucchese, J.D. 2005, president of Berklee College of Music
- Linda McClain, J.D. 1985, professor of Law at Boston University School of Law
- Lee H. Roberts, J.D. 1994, chancellor at University of North Carolina at Chapel Hill

== Activism and nonprofits ==
- Abba Cohen, vice president of Government Affairs of Agudath Israel of America
- Brian Concannon, 1989, founding director of the Institute for justice and Democracy in Haiti
- Gary Bauer, 1973, president of the Family Research Council (1988–1999) and conservative activist
- Sandra Fluke, 2012, women's rights activist
- Susie Gelman, activist and philanthropist
- David G. Greenfield, CEO of the Metropolitan Council on Jewish Poverty
- Barry W. Lynn, 1978, executive director of Americans United for Separation of Church and State

== Business ==
- Denise Bode, LL.M., CEO of the American Wind Energy Association
- David G. Bradley, 1983, founder of the Advisory Board Company and owner of the Atlantic Media Company
- Scott Ginsburg, 1978, founding owner of Boardwalk Auto Group, radio broadcasting mogul
- Thomas E. Leavey, 1923, co-founder of Farmers Insurance, co-founder of the Thomas and Dorothy Leavey Foundation
- Doug Leeds, 1996, CEO of IAC Publishing and former CEO of Ask.com
- Chris Sacca, 2000, billionaire venture capitalist
- Thomas Schlafly, 1977, president and co-founder of Saint Louis Brewery
- Mark Weinberger, LL.M. 1991, global chairman and CEO of Ernst & Young LLP (2013–present
- Ralph V. Whitworth, 1985, founder of Relational Investors and interim chairman of the board of Hewlett-Packard
- Dominique Shelton Leipzig, founder and CEO of Global Data Innovation, co-founder and co-CEO of NxtWork

== Entertainment ==
- Kary Antholis, 1989, president of HBO Miniseries and Academy Award-winning documentary filmmaker
- Savannah Guthrie, 2002, co-anchor of The Today Show on NBC (2012–present)
- Alan Lipman, 1993, commentator on gun violence, mass shootings, and terrorism for CNN, BBC, and MSNBC
- John Luessenhop, director of Takers and Texas Chainsaw 3D
- Marilyn Milian, 1984, judge of The People's Court and former judge on the Miami Circuit Court
- Sammy thrashLife, 2011, artist and punk rock musician
- Greta Van Susteren, 1979, LL.M. '83, anchor of On the Record on the Fox News Channel

== Government ==
- Horace M. Albright, 1916, director of the National Park Service (1929–1933)
- Robert C. Bonner, 1966, commissioner of the United States Customs and Border Protection (2001–2005), administrator of the Drug Enforcement Administration (1990–1993), and judge on the U.S. District Court for the Central District of California (1989)
- Bradford P. Campbell, assistant secretary of Labor (2007–2009)
- George B. Cortelyou, 1895, U.S. secretary of the Treasury (1907–1909), U.S. Postmaster General (1905–1907), and U.S. secretary of Commerce and Labor (1903–1904)
- James C. Duff, 1981, director of the Administrative Office of the U.S. Courts (2006–2011) and president and CEO of the Newseum and Freedom Forum
- Douglas Feith, 1978, undersecretary of Defense for Policy (2001–2005)
- Mark Gearan, 1991, director of the Peace Corps (1995–1999) and White House Communications Director (1993–1995)
- Avril Haines, 2001, director of National Intelligence (since 2021), deputy National Security advisor (2014–2017), and former deputy director of the Central Intelligence Agency
- Robert O. Harris, LL.M. 1961, chairman of the National Mediation Board
- Herman "Ed" Hollis, 1927, FBI special agent involved in shootouts with John Dillinger and Baby Face Nelson
- Mickey Kantor, 1968, U.S. secretary of commerce (1996–1997)
- Jack Lew, 1983, U.S. secretary of the treasury (2013–2017), White House chief of staff (2012–2013), and director of the Office of Management and Budget (2010–2012)
- Robert Lighthizer, 1973, U.S. trade representative (2017–2021)
- Maeve Kennedy McKean, 2009, senior advisor on human rights to the United States Department of State's global AIDS program and the Office of Global Affairs at the U.S. Department of Health and Human Services
- Clay Pell, 2008, deputy assistant secretary for International and Foreign Language Education in the United States Department of Education and commander and judge advocate in the United States Coast Guard Reserve
- John Podesta, 1976, White House chief of staff (1998–2001) and president of Center for American Progress (2001–2013)
- Jerome Powell, 1979, chair of the Federal Reserve (2018–present), Federal Reserve Board of Governors (2012–present), and under secretary of the Treasury for Domestic Finance (1992–1993)
- Michael Powell, 1993, chairman of the Federal Communications Commission (2001–2005)
- Donald Rumsfeld, non-degreed, U.S. secretary of defense (1957)
- Christine A. Varney, 1985, federal trade commissioner (1994–1997), U.S. assistant attorney general for the Antitrust Division (2009–2011)
- Robert Wilkie, LL.M. 1992, United States secretary of Veterans Affairs (2018–2021)
- Judith A. Winston, 1977, undersecretary (1999–2001) and general counsel (1993–2001) United States Department of Education

== Judiciary ==
=== Federal court ===
- Jesse C. Adkins, LL.B. 1899 and LL.M. 1900, judge on the U.S. District Court for the District of Columbia (1930–1955)
- Seth Aframe, 1999, judge on the U.S. Court of Appeals for the First Circuit (2024–present)
- Loren AliKhan, 2006, judge on the U.S. District Court for the District of Columbia (2023–present)
- Thomas L. Ambro, 1975, judge on the U.S. Court of Appeals for the Third Circuit (2000–present)
- Michael Anello, 1968, judge on the U.S. District Court for the Southern District of California (2008–present)
- Robert Armen, 1973, judge on the United States Tax Court
- William G. Bassler, 1963, judge on the U.S. District Court for the District of New Jersey (1991–2006)
- Walter M. Bastian, 1913, judge on the U.S. Court of Appeals for the District of Columbia Circuit (1954–1975)
- Terrence Berg, 1986, judge on the U.S. District Court for the Eastern District of Michigan (2012–present)
- Francisco Besosa, 1979, judge on the U.S. District Court for the District of Puerto Rico (2006–present)
- James K. Bredar, 1982, judge on the U.S. District Court for the District of Maryland (2010–present)
- Emil Joseph Bove III, 2008, judge on the U.S. Court of Appeals for the Third Circuit (2025–present)
- Lynn J. Bush, 1976, judge on the United States Court of Federal Claims (1998–present)
- Richard C. Casey, 1958, judge on the U.S. District Court for the Southern District of New York (1997–2007)
- Thomas James Clary, 1924, judge on the U.S. District Court for the Eastern District of Pennsylvania (1950–1977)
- Robert Chatigny, 1978, judge on the U.S. District Court for the District of Connecticut (2004–present)
- David Chávez, 1922, judge on the U.S. District Court for the District of Puerto Rico (1947–1950), justice of the New Mexico Supreme Court (1960–1968)
- Pamela K. Chen, 1986, judge on the U.S. District Court for the Eastern District of New York (2013–present)
- Carolyn Chiechi, '69, LL.M. '71, judge on the United States Tax Court (1992–2007)
- Charles N. Clevert Jr., 1972, judge on the U.S. District Court for the Eastern District of Wisconsin (1996–present)
- John David Clifford Jr., 1913, judge on the U.S. District Court for the District of Maine (1947–1956), U.S. Attorney for the District of Maine (1933–1947)
- John O. Colvin, LL.M. 1978, judge on the United States Tax Court (1998–present, chief judge 2006–present)
- Patrick Anthony Conmy, 1959, judge on the U.S. District Court for the District of North Dakota (1985–present, chief judge 1985–1992)
- Julian A. Cook, 1957, judge on the U.S. District Court for the Eastern District of Michigan (1979–present, chief judge 1989–1996)
- Virginia M. Hernandez Covington, 1980, judge on the U.S. District Court for the Middle District of Florida (2004–present)
- Ronald Davies, 1930, judge on the U.S. District Court for the District of North Dakota (1955–1985) who while on temporary assignment in Little Rock, Arkansas presided over the Little Rock Integration Crisis in 1957
- Robert N. Davis, 1978, judge on the United States Court of Appeals for Veterans Claims (2004–present)
- John T. Elfvin, 1947, judge on the U.S. District Court for the Western District of New York (1974–2009)
- Charles Fahy, 1914, judge on the U.S. Court of Appeals for the District of Columbia Circuit (1950–1979)
- D. Michael Fisher, 1969, judge on the U.S. Court of Appeals for the Third Circuit (2003–present), attorney general of Pennsylvania (1997–2003)
- Arthur J. Gajarsa, 1967, judge on the U.S. Court of Appeals for the Federal Circuit (1997–2012)
- Marvin J. Garbis, LL.M. 1962, judge on the U.S. District Court for the District of Maryland (1989–present)
- Ashley Mulgrave Gould, 1884, judge on the U.S. District Court for the District of Columbia (1902–1921)
- Thomas Hardiman, 1990, judge on the U.S. Court of Appeals for the Third Circuit (2007–present)
- George J. Hazel, 1999, judge on the U.S. District Court for the District of Maryland (2014–present)
- Walter Heen, 1955, judge on the U.S. District Court for the District of Hawaii (1981), U.S. Attorney for the District of Hawaii
- Judith C. Herrera, 1979, judge on the U.S. District Court for the District of New Mexico (2003–present)
- William Hitz, 1900, judge on the U.S. Court of Appeals for the District of Columbia Circuit (1931–1935)
- Michael Robert Hogan, 1971, judge on the U.S. District Court for the District of Oregon (1991–2012, chief judge 1995–2002)
- Thomas F. Hogan, 1966, judge on the United States Foreign Intelligence Surveillance Court (2009–present), judge on the U.S. District Court for the District of Columbia (1982–present, chief judge 2001 – 2008)
- Ellen Lipton Hollander, 1974, judge on the U.S. District Court for the District of Maryland (2010–present)
- Jerome Holmes, 1988, judge on the U.S. Court of Appeals for the Tenth Circuit (2006–present)
- Jeffrey R. Howard, 1981, judge on U.S. Court of Appeals for the First Circuit (2002–present)
- Brian Anthony Jackson, LL.M. 2000, judge on the U.S. District Court for the Middle District of Louisiana (2010–present)
- Norma Johnson, 1962, judge on the U.S. District Court for the District of Columbia (1980–2003, chief judge 1997–2001), first African-American woman to serve as chief judge of a U.S. District Court
- Kent A. Jordan, 1984, judge on the U.S. Court of Appeals for the Third Circuit (2006–2025)
- Elaine D. Kaplan, 1979, judge on the U.S. Court of Federal Claims (2013–present), acting director of the U.S Office of Personnel Management (2013)
- Bruce E. Kasold, LL.M. 1982, judge on the United States Court of Appeals for Veterans Claims (2003–present)
- Richmond Keech, LL.B. 1922, LL.M. 1923, judge on the U.S. District Court for the District of Columbia (1947–1986, chief judge 1966)
- Timothy J. Kelly, 1997, judge on the U.S. District Court for the District of Columbia (2017–present)
- Paul Kilday, 1922, judge on the U.S. Court of Appeals for the Armed Forces (1961–1968)
- Charles B. Kornmann, 1962, judge on the U.S. District Court for the District of South Dakota (1995–present)
- Mark R. Kravitz, 1975, judge on the U.S. District Court for the District of Connecticut (2003–2012)
- Joseph Normand Laplante, 1990, judge on the U.S. District Court for the District of New Hampshire (2007–present)
- Bolitha James Laws, LL.B. 1913 and LL.M. 1914, judge on the U.S. District Court for the District of Columbia (1938–1958, chief judge 1945–1958)
- Joseph Patrick Lieb, 1924, judge on the U.S. District Court for the Middle District of Florida (1962–1971, chief judge 1966–1971)
- Richard Linn, 1969, judge on the U.S. Court of Appeals for the Federal Circuit (2000–present)
- Frank J. Magill, 1955, judge on the U.S. Court of Appeals for the Eighth Circuit (1986–2013), father of Stanford Law School Dean M. Elizabeth Magill
- Kiyo A. Matsumoto, 1981, judge on the U.S. District Court for the Eastern District of New York (2008–present)
- Roslynn R. Mauskopf, 1982, judge on the U.S. District Court for the Eastern District of New York (2007–2024, chief judge 2020–2021), director of the Administrative Office of the U.S. Courts (2021–2024), U.S. Attorney for the Eastern District of New York (2002–2007), Inspector General of the State of New York (1995–2002)
- Steven J. McAuliffe, 1973, judge on U.S. District Court for the District of New Hampshire (1992–present), widower of astronaut Christa McAuliffe
- Joseph Charles McGarraghy, 1921, judge on the U.S. District Court for the District of Columbia (1965–1975)
- M. Margaret McKeown, 1975, judge on the U.S. Court of Appeals for the Ninth Circuit (1998–present)
- Sean J. McLaughlin, 1980, judge on the U.S. District Court for the Western District of Pennsylvania (1994–2013, chief judge 2013), general counsel and vice president of the Erie Insurance Group (2013–present)
- Kimberly Ann Moore, 1994, judge on the U.S. Court of Appeals for the Federal Circuit (2006–present)
- Frank Jerome Murray, 1929, judge on the U.S. District Court for the District of Massachusetts (1967–1995)
- Frank Herbert Norcross, 1894, judge on the U.S. District Court for the District of Nevada (1928–1952), justice of the Supreme Court of Nevada (1904–1916)
- Daniel William O'Donoghue, LL.B. 1899, LL.M. 1900, judge on the U.S. District Court for the District of Columbia (1932–1948)
- Fred I. Parker, 1965, judge on the U.S. Court of Appeals for the Second Circuit (1994–2003)
- Jaime Pieras, Jr., 1948, judge on the U.S. District Court for the District of Puerto Rico (1982–2011)
- David Andrew Pine, 1913, judge on the U.S. District Court for the District of Columbia (1940–1970, chief judge 1959–1961), U.S. Attorney for the District of Columbia (1938–1940)
- E. Barrett Prettyman, 1915, judge on the U.S. Court of Appeals for the District of Columbia Circuit (1945–1971, chief judge 1958–1960)
- Marjorie Rendell, non-degreed, judge on the United States Court of Appeals for the Third Circuit (1997–present), in 1971
- Ilana Rovner, non-degreed, judge on the United States Court of Appeals for the Seventh Circuit (1992–present), in 1964 and 1965
- Robert Renner, 1949, judge on the U.S. District Court for the District of Minnesota (1980–2005), U.S. Attorney for the District of Minnesota (1969–1977)
- James L. Robart, 1973, judge on the U.S. District Court for the Western District of Washington (2004–present)
- Rodolfo Ruiz, 2005, judge on the U.S. District Court for the Southern District of Florida (2019–present)
- K. Gary Sebelius, 1974, magistrate judge on the U.S. District Court for the District of Kansas (2003–present)
- Patricia Seitz, 1973, judge on the U.S. District Court for the Southern District of Florida (1998–present)
- Thomas Michael Shanahan, 1959, judge on the U.S. District Court for the District of Nebraska (1993–2004), justice of the Nebraska Supreme Court (1983–1993)
- Edward F. Shea, 1970, judge on the U.S. District Court for the Eastern District of Washington (1997–present)
- Dennis Shedd, LL.M. 1980, judge on the U.S. Court of Appeals for the Fourth Circuit (1990–present)
- Eugene Edward Siler, Jr., LL.M. 1964, judge on the U.S. Court of Appeals for the Sixth Circuit (1991–present)
- John Sirica, 1926, judge on the U.S. District Court for the District of Columbia (1957–1974, chief judge 1971–1974); presided over the Watergate trials; named TIME magazine's Man of the Year in 1973
- John Lewis Smith, Jr., LL.B. 1938 and LL.M. 1939, judge on the United States District Court for the District of Columbia (1966–1992, chief judge 1981–1982)
- William E. Smith, 1987, judge on the U.S. District Court for the District of Rhode Island, chief judge (2013–present)
- Timothy C. Stanceu, 1979, judge on the U.S. Court of International Trade (2003–present)
- George Clinton Sweeney, 1922, judge on the U.S. District Court for the District of Massachusetts (1935–1966, chief judge 1948–1965)
- Edward Allen Tamm, 1930, judge on the U.S. Court of Appeals for the District of Columbia Circuit (1965–1985)
- Robert Timlin, 1959, judge on the U.S. District Court for the Central District of California (1994–present)
- Roger W. Titus, 1966, judge on the U.S. District Court for the District of Maryland (2003–present)
- Ricardo M. Urbina, 1970, judge on the U.S. District Court for the District of Columbia (1994–2012)
- James A. Walsh, 1928, judge on the U.S. District Court for the District of Arizona (1952–1991, chief judge 1961–1972)
- David C. Westenhaver, 1886, judge on the U.S. District Court for the Northern District of Ohio (1917–1928)
- Ashton Hilliard Williams, 1915, judge on the United States District Court for the Eastern District of South Carolina (1952–1962)
- Douglas P. Woodlock, 1975, judge on the U.S. District Court for the District of Massachusetts (1986–present)
- Jennifer Guerin Zipps, 1990, judge on the U.S. District Court for the District of Arizona (2011–present)

=== State/district court ===
- Loren AliKhan, 2006, associate judge of the District of Columbia Court of Appeals (2022–2023), judge on the U.S. District Court for the District of Columbia (2023–present)
- A. G. C. Bierer, 1886, associate justice of the Oklahoma Territory Supreme Court (1896–1904)
- Richard C. Bosson, 1969, justice of the New Mexico Supreme Court (2002–2015)
- J. J. P. Corrigan, 1925, associate justice of the Ohio Supreme Court (1969–1976)
- Robert E. Davis, 1964, justice of the Kansas Supreme Court (1993–present), chief justice (2009–2010)
- James E. Edmondson, 1973, justice of the Oklahoma Supreme Court (2003–present), chief justice (2009–2010)
- Gene E. Franchini, 1960, justice of the New Mexico Supreme Court (1990–2002, chief justice 1997–1999)
- Lorie Skjerven Gildea, 1986, associate justice of the Minnesota Supreme Court (2006–2010), Chief justice (2010–2023)
- Caitlin Halligan, 1995, associate judge of the New York Court of Appeals (2023–present)
- Helen E. Hoens, 1977, associate justice of the New Jersey Supreme Court (2006–2013)
- Andrew M. Horton, 1977, associate justice of the Maine Supreme Judicial Court (2020–2025)
- John P. Howard III, 2010, associate judge of the District of Columbia Court of Appeals (2022–present)
- Henry P. Hughes, 1927, justice of the Wisconsin Supreme Court (1948–1951)
- Travis Jett, 2011, justice of the Oklahoma Supreme Court (2025–present)
- Rives Kistler, 1981, associate justice of the Oregon Supreme Court (2003–2018), first openly gay state Supreme Court justice in the United States
- Stephen P. Lamb, 1975, Delaware Court of Chancery vice chancellor
- Frank G. Mahady, 1964, associate justice of the Vermont Supreme Court (1987–1988), judge of the Vermont District Court (1982–1992)
- William C. Mims, LL.M. 1986, justice of the Supreme Court of Virginia (2010–present), Attorney General of Virginia (2009–2010)
- Sal Mungia, 1984, associate justice of the Washington Supreme Court (2025–present)
- Michael Musmanno, LL.B., 1918, associate justice of the Supreme Court of Pennsylvania (1951–1968)
- Vanessa Ruiz, associate judge of the District of Columbia Court of Appeals (1994–2011)
- Joseph T. Walsh, 1954, justice of the Delaware Supreme Court (1985–2005)
- Robert A. Zarnoch, 1974, judge on the Maryland Court of Special Appeals (2008–2015)
- James R. Zazzali, 1962, chief justice on the New Jersey Supreme Court (2006–20007), associate justice on the New Jersey Supreme Court (2000-2006)

=== Foreign courts ===
- Gregory Dolin, J.D. 2004, associate justice of the Supreme Court of Palau
- Clarence Lorenzo Simpson Jr., LL.B., former associate justice of the Supreme Court of Liberia
- Judith M. Woods, LL.M. 1978, justice of the Canadian Federal Court of Appeal (2016–present)

== Law ==
=== Government ===
==== Attorney general ====
- Adam Laxalt, 2005, Nevada attorney general (2015–2019), Republican nominee for governor of Nevada (2018), Republican nominee for US Senate (2022)
- Michael Delaney, 1994, New Hampshire attorney general (2009–2013)
- John J. Easton, Jr., 1970, Vermont attorney general (1981–1985)
- Shavit Matias, LL.M. 1991, deputy attorney general of Israel (2004–2013); Hoover Institution, Stanford University (2013–present)
- Josh Shapiro, 2002, attorney general of Pennsylvania (2017–2023), Pennsylvania House of Representatives (2005–2012), and governor of Pennsylvania (2023–present)
- Clarence Lorenzo Simpson Jr., former attorney general and minister of justice of Liberia
- Daniel S. Sullivan, 1993, Alaska attorney general (2009–2010) and U.S. senator from Alaska (2015–present)
- Monty Wilkinson, 1988, acting United States attorney general (2021)

==== District and U.S. attorney ====
- Margaret Currin, United States attorney for the Eastern District of North Carolina
- Daniel L. Master, Jr., 1980, Acting District Attorney, Richmond County, New York (2015)
- Edward A. McDonald, Attorney-in-Charge of United States Organized Crime Strike Force prosecuting 1978–79 Boston College basketball point-shaving scandal and Mafia leaders like Carmine Persico, Philip, Rastelli, Joseph Massino, Paul Vario, James Burke, and Michael Franzese
- Kenneth Allen Polite Jr., 2000, United States attorney for the Eastern District of Louisiana (2013–2017)
- Nicholas A. Trutanich, 2005, United States attorney for the District of Nevada (2019–2021)
- Cyrus Vance Jr., 1982, New York County district attorney (2010–2022)
- R. Seth Williams, 1992, district attorney of Philadelphia (2009–2017)

==== Military ====
- Sean Coffey, 1987, general counsel of the Navy

==== Solicitor general ====
- Charles H. Fahy, 1914, U.S. solicitor general (1941–1945)
- Barbara D. Underwood, 1969, acting United States solicitor general (2001), acting New York attorney general (2018–2019), New York solicitor general (2007–present)

==== White House counsel ====
- John Dean, 1965, White House counsel (1970–1973), convicted of involvement in the Watergate Scandal
- Bruce Lindsey, 1975, former White House deputy legal counsel and chairman of the board of the Clinton Foundation
- Don McGahn, LL.M. 1902, White House counsel (2017–2018)
- Beth Nolan, 1980, White House counsel (1999–2001) and senior vice president and general counsel at George Washington University (2007–present)
- Mark Paoletta, 1987, chief counsel to Vice President Michael Pence (2017–present)
- Jack Quinn, 1975, White House counsel (1995–1997)
- Kathryn Ruemmler, 1996, White House counsel (2011–2014)

==== Other areas ====
- Susan Tsui Grundmann, lawyer and member of the Federal Labor Relations Authority

=== Private practice ===
- Robert S. Bennett, 1964, senior partner at Hogan Lovells; represented President Bill Clinton during the Monica Lewinsky hearings
- Thomas Hale Boggs Jr., 1965, chairman of Patton Boggs
- Joseph Cammarata, LL.M. 1987, represented Paula Jones in a sexual harassment lawsuit against President Bill Clinton, and seven women against Bill Cosby
- Ty Cobb, 1978, senior partner at Hogan Lovells; represented President Donald Trump during the Mueller Investigation
- Alan Gura, 1995, successfully argued District of Columbia v. Heller
- Stephen Halbrook, 1978, litigator for the NRA, successfully argued Printz v. United States
- Shon Hopwood, LL.M. 1917, filer of multiple successful petitions for certiorari with the Supreme Court as a jailhouse lawyer prior to obtaining his law degree; criminal justice advocate
- Charles LiMandri, argued the Mount Soledad Cross case, the longest running First Amendment case in history
- Marvin S. Putnam, 1993, partner at Latham & Watkins
- William Shea, LL.B. 1931, co-founder of Shea & Gould, instrumental in the founding of the New York Mets and New York Islanders
- Brendan Sullivan, 1967, senior partner at Williams & Connolly; represented Oliver North during the Iran-Contra affair

== Literature and journalism ==
- Joan Biskupic, 1993, editor in charge of legal affairs for Reuters and author of several books on the U.S. Supreme Court
- Diane Heiman, writer of children's nonfiction
- Erika Kullberg, social media influencer, financial advisor, and former corporate attorney
- John Oller, 1982, nonfiction writer
- Walter Pincus, 2001, Emmy Award, Pulitzer Prize, and Polk Award-winning national security journalist for The Washington Post

== Politics ==
=== U.S. president ===
- Lyndon B. Johnson, non-degreed, former president of the United States, in 1934

=== Diplomacy ===
- Elizabeth Frawley Bagley, 1987, U.S. ambassador to Portugal (1994–1997)
- Juan José Gómez Camacho, permanent representative of Mexico to the United Nations
- Pamela Coke-Hamilton, director of international trade for United Nations Conference on Trade and Development
- Lee A. Feinstein, U.S. ambassador to Poland (2009–2012)
- Laurie S. Fulton, 1989, U.S. ambassador to Denmark (2009–2013)
- Mark Gitenstein, 1972, U.S. ambassador to Romania (2009–2012)
- James Robert Jones, 1964, U.S. ambassador to Mexico (1993–1997) and U.S. representative from Oklahoma (1983–1987)
- Gerald S. McGowan, 1974, U.S. ambassador to Portugal (1997–2001)
- George Mitchell, 1961, United States special envoy for Northern Ireland (1995–2001), U.S. senator from Maine (1980–1995), and Senate majority leader (1989–1995)
- Francis Rooney, 1978, U.S. ambassador to the Holy See (2005–2008) and U.S. representative from Florida (2017–2021)

=== Members of U.S. Congress ===
- William B. Bankhead, 1895, U.S. speaker of the House during the New Deal (1936–1940) and U.S. representative from Alabama (1917–1940)
- Bob Barr, 1987, U.S. representative from Georgia (1995–2003) and United States Libertarian Party presidential candidate (2008)
- George A. Bartlett, 1894, U.S. representative from Nevada (1907–1911)
- Herbert H. Bateman, 1956, U.S. representative from Virginia (1983–2000)
- Robert Bauman, 1964, U.S. representative from Maryland (1973–1981)
- Alan Bible, 1934, U.S. senator from Nevada (1954–1974)
- Coleman Livingston Blease, 1889, U.S. senator from South Carolina (1925–1931), governor of South Carolina (1911–1915)
- J. Caleb Boggs, 1937, U.S. senator from Delaware (1961–1973); governor of Delaware (1953–1960); U.S. representative from Delaware (1947–1953)
- Bruce Faulkner Caputo, 1971, U.S. representative from New York (1977–1979)
- Dennis Chavez, 1920, U.S. senator from New Mexico (1935–1962)
- David Cicilline, 1986, U.S. representative from Rhode Island (2011–present), first openly gay mayor of a U.S. state capitol (Providence)
- Hansen Clarke, 1987, U.S. representative from Michigan (2011–2013)
- Charles R. Clason, 1914, U.S. representative from Massachusetts (1937–1949)
- L. Gary Clemente, 1931, U.S. representative from New York (1949–1953)
- Barbara Comstock, 1986, U.S. representative from Virginia (2015–2019), Virginia House of Delegates (2010–2014)
- Charles F. Curry Jr., 1912, U.S. representative from California (1931–1933)
- April McClain Delaney, 1989, U.S. representative from Maryland (2025-present)
- John Delaney, 1988, U.S. representative from Maryland (2013–2019)
- John Dingell, 1952, U.S. representative from Michigan (1955–2015)
- John J. Douglass, 1896, U.S. representative from Massachusetts (1925–1933)
- Robert Drinan, 1950, U.S. representative from Massachusetts (1971–1973)
- Richard Durbin, 1969, U.S. senator from Illinois (1997–present), Senate Democratic Whip (2005–present)
- John A. Durkin, 1965, U.S. senator from New Hampshire (1975–1980)
- Lane Evans, 1978, U.S. representative from Illinois (1983–2007)
- John Faso, 1979, U.S. representative from New York (2017–2019) and minority leader of the New York State Assembly (1998–2002)
- Lois Frankel, 1973, U.S. representative from Florida (2013–present)
- Martin Frost, 1970, U.S. representative from Texas (1979–2005)
- Mazie Hirono, 1978, U.S. senator from Hawaii (2013–present), U.S. representative from Hawaii (2007–2013), lieutenant governor of Hawaii (1994–2003)
- Steny Hoyer, 1966, U.S. representative from Maryland (1981–present), House Majority Leader (2007–2011, 2019–present), House Democratic Whip (2003–2007, 2011–2019)
- Michael L. Igoe, 1908, U.S. representative from Illinois (1935), U.S. attorney for the Northern District of Illinois (1935–1939), judge for the U.S. District Court for the Northern District of Illinois (1939–1965)
- James Robert Jones, 1964, U.S. representative from Oklahoma (1983–1987) and U.S. Ambassador to Mexico (1993–1997)
- Bill Jefferson, LL.M. 1995, U.S. representative from Louisiana (1991–2009)
- Mark Kirk, 192, U.S. senator from Illinois (2010–2016)
- Anne McLane Kuster, 1984, U.S. representative from New Hampshire (2013–present)
- John W. Langley, U.S. representative from Kentucky (1907–1926)
- Edward L. Leahy, 1908, U.S. senator (1949–1950) and judge on the U.S. District Court for the District of Rhode Island (1951–1953)
- Patrick Leahy, 1964, U.S. senator from Vermont (1975–2023) and president pro tempore of the U.S. senator (2012–2023)
- George Swinton Legare, 1893, U.S. representative from South Carolina (1903–1913)
- Ted Lieu, 1994, U.S. representative from California (2015–present)
- Dan Lungren, 1971, U.S. representative from California (2005–2013)
- George Mitchell, 1961, U.S. senator from Maine (1980–1995), Senate Majority Leader (1989–1995), and United States Special Envoy for Northern Ireland (1995–2001)
- Joseph C. O'Mahoney, 1920, U.S. senator from Wyoming (1954–1961; 1934–1953)
- Francis Rooney, 1978, U.S. representative from Florida (2017–2021), U.S. Ambassador to the Holy See (2005–2008)
- Stephanie Herseth Sandlin, 1997, U.S. representative from South Dakota (2004–2010)
- Mikie Sherrill, 2008, U.S. representative from New Jersey (2018–2025), governor of New Jersey (2026–present)
- Daniel S. Sullivan, 1993, U.S. senator from Alaska (2015–present) and Alaska attorney general (2009–2010)
- Clarence D. Van Duzer, 1893, U.S. representative from Nevada (1903–1907)
- Chris Van Hollen, 1990, U.S. senator from Maryland (2017–present) and U.S. representative from Maryland (2003–2016)
- Pete Visclosky, LL.M. 1982, U.S. representative from Indiana (1985–present)
- James H. Webb, 1975, U.S. senator from Virginia (2007–2013) and U.S. secretary of the Navy (1987–1988)
- Rick White, 1980, U.S. representative from Washington (1995–1999)
- Frank Wolf, 1965, U.S. representative from Virginia (1981–2015)
- Albert Wynn, 1977, U.S. representative from Maryland (1993–2008)
- John Yarmuth, non-degreed, U.S. representative from Kentucky, (1971–1972)

=== State administration ===
- Jerry Abramson, 1971, lieutenant governor of Kentucky (2011–2014), mayor of Louisville, Kentucky (1986–2011)
- Sam Arora, 2010, Maryland House of Delegates (2011–2014)
- Chaz Beasley, 2013, North Carolina House of Representatives (2016–2020)
- Mike Castle, 1964, governor of Delaware (1985–1992), U.S. representative from Delaware (1993–2011)
- John Chiang, California state treasurer (2015–2019), California state controller (2007–2015)
- Peter Tali Coleman, 1951, governor of American Samoa (1956–1961, 1978–1985, 1989–1993)
- Mitch Daniels, 1979, governor of Indiana (2005–2013), president of Purdue University (2013–present)
- Christopher Del Sesto, governor of Rhode Island (1959–1961), justice of the Rhode Island Supreme Court (1966–1973)
- Frank S. Farley, 1925, New Jersey state senator and mob and political boss
- Pat Frank, Florida State Senator (did not graduate)
- Derek Hodge, 1971, lieutenant governor of the United States Virgin Islands (1987–1995)
- Brad Hutto, 1981, South Carolina Senate
- Jeff Johnson, 1992, Minnesota House of Representatives (2001–2007)
- Ash Kalra, 1996, California State Assembly (2016–present)
- Jason Kander, 2005, Missouri House of Representatives (2009–2013) and Missouri secretary of state (2013–2017)
- John Lynch, 1984, governor of New Hampshire (2005–2013)
- Dorothy McAuliffe, First Lady of Virginia (2014–2018)
- Terry McAuliffe, 1984, governor of Virginia (2014–2018) and chairman of the Democratic National Committee (2001–2005)
- Jim McGreevey, 1981, governor of New Jersey (2002–2004)
- Josh Shapiro, 2002, Pennsylvania House of Representatives (2005–2012), governor of Pennsylvania (2023–present), and attorney general of Pennsylvania (2017–2023)
- Mikie Sherrill, 2007, governor of New Jersey (2026–Present)
- Don Siegelman, 1972, governor of Alabama (1999–2003)
- Sheila Simon, 1987, lieutenant governor of Illinois (2011–2015)
- John D. Spellman, 1953, governor of Washington (1981–1985)
- Michael Steele, 1991, lieutenant governor of Maryland (2003–2007) and chairman of the Republican National Committee (2009–2011)
- Robert Zirkin, 1998, Maryland State Senate (2007–2020)

=== Local politics ===
- David Catania, 1994, D.C. City Council (1997–2015)
- Jim Graham, LL.M., D.C. City Council (1999–2017)
- David Grosso, 2001, D.C. City Council (2013–present)
- Vincent Orange, LL.M. 1988, D.C. City Council (1998–2007, 2011–2016)
- James Patrick Rossiter, 1916, mayor of Erie, Pennsylvania (1932–1936)

=== Non-U.S. ===
- Jesus Borja, 1974, lieutenant governor of the Northern Mariana Islands (1994–1998)
- Francis Escudero, LL.M., 1996, president of the Senate of the Philippines and former governor of Sorsogon

=== Other politics ===
- Jack Abramoff, 1986, lobbyist and businessman who was a central figure in a series of high-profile political scandals
- Stephanie Cutter, 1997, political consultant and deputy campaign manager for Barack Obama's 2012 presidential campaign
- Paul Manafort, 1974, chief strategist for the Donald Trump presidential campaign, 2016 and lobbyist known for representing prominent dictators
- John Sears, 1963, campaign manager for Ronald Reagan in 1976 and 1980
- Tiffany Trump, daughter of President Donald Trump
- Caren Z. Turner, 1985, co-chairwoman of the super PAC Ready for Hillary
- Jeff Weaver, 1996, campaign manager for Bernie Sanders presidential campaign, 2016
- Jaime Harrison, 2004, chair of the Democratic National Committee (2021–2025)

== Sports ==
- Joe Garagiola Jr., 1975, senior vice president for standards and on-field operations for Major League Baseball (2011–present) and senior vice president and general manager for the Arizona Diamondbacks (1997–2005)
- Nancy Hogshead-Makar, 1997, 1984 Summer Olympics swimming gold medalist
- André Matias, J.D. 2019, 2016 Summer Olympics and 2024 Summer Olympics
- Martin Mayhew, 2000, football player and executive
- Mark Murphy, 1988, president and CEO of the Green Bay Packers (2007–present) and two-time Super Bowl champion with the Washington Redskins
- Carmen Policy, 1966, president and CEO of the San Francisco 49ers (1991–1999) and the Cleveland Browns (1999–2004)
- Michael Slive, LL.M. 1966, commissioner of the Southeastern Conference
- Edward Bennett Williams, 1944, owner and president of the Washington Redskins (1969–1979) and owner of the Baltimore Orioles (1980–1988)

== Fictional alumni ==
- Alicia Florrick, lead character in The Good Wife
- Will Gardner, supporting character in The Good Wife
- Olivia Pope, lead character in Scandal
- Harmon Rabb, lead character in JAG
- Mic Brumby, supporting character in JAG
- Charlie Young, supporting character in The West Wing
- Chuck McGill, main cast character and attorney in Better Call Saul, played by Michael McKean
- Larry Murphy, supporting character and attorney in Dear Evan Hansen, played by Danny Pino
- Alex Claremont-Diaz, lead character and law student in Red, White & Royal Blue, played by Taylor Zakhar Perez
- Owen Hendricks, lead character in The Recruit
- Hannah Copeland, supporting character in The Recruit
