= John S. Sherburne =

American judge

John Samuel Sherburne
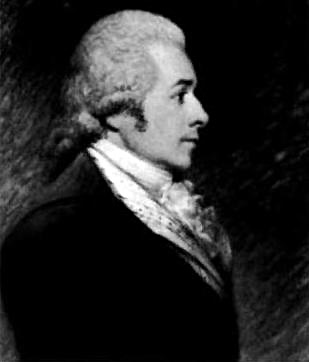

Judge of the United States District Court for the District of New Hampshire
- In office March 26, 1804 – August 2, 1830
- Appointed by: Thomas Jefferson
- Preceded by: John Pickering
- Succeeded by: Matthew Harvey

Member of the U.S. House of Representatives from New Hampshire's at-large district
- In office March 4, 1793 – March 3, 1797
- Preceded by: Samuel Livermore
- Succeeded by: William Gordon

Personal details
- Born: John Samuel Sherburne; 1757 Portsmouth, Province of New Hampshire, British America
- Died: August 2, 1830 (aged 72–73) Portsmouth, New Hampshire, U.S.
- Party: Anti-Administration; Democratic-Republican
- Education: Harvard University; Dartmouth College read law

John Samuel Sherburne (1757 – August 2, 1830) was a United States representative from New Hampshire and a United States district judge of the United States District Court for the District of New Hampshire.

== Education and career ==
Born in 1757, in Portsmouth, Province of New Hampshire, British America, Sherburne attended Harvard University, graduated from Dartmouth College in 1776 and read law in 1776. During the American Revolutionary War he served in the Continental Army as a brigade staff major. He entered private practice in Portsmouth, New Hampshire from 1776 to 1789, and from 1797 to 1801. He was United States Attorney for the District of New Hampshire from 1789 to 1793, and from 1801 to 1804. He was a member of the New Hampshire House of Representatives from 1790 to c. 1793, and in 1801. He was also the runner-up in both the 1790 at-large election, in which the top 3 won and Sherburne placed 4th, and a 1789 special election for the U.S. House, after previous member-elect Benjamin West declined to serve.

== Congressional service ==
Sherburne was elected as an Anti-Administration candidate from New Hampshire's at-large congressional district to the United States House of Representatives of the 3rd United States Congress and reelected as a Democratic-Republican to the 4th United States Congress, serving from March 4, 1793, to March 3, 1797.

== Federal judicial service ==
Sherburne was nominated by President Thomas Jefferson on March 22, 1804, to a seat on the United States District Court for the District of New Hampshire vacated by Judge John Pickering. He was confirmed by the United States Senate on March 24, 1804, and received his commission on March 26, 1804. His service terminated on August 2, 1830, due to his death in Portsmouth.

=== Involvement in impeachment, conviction and removal of Pickering ===
Pickering was the first federal official to be removed from office through impeachment on March 12, 1804. Sherburne, who as a witness for the prosecution managers had aided the case for Pickering's removal even though the latter was insane and did not knowingly commit "high crimes and misdemeanors" on the bench, himself became insane and was for all intents and purposes removed from the bench in 1826, though he continued to receive his salary until his 1830 death.

== Sources ==
- United States Congress. "John S. Sherburne (id: S000339)". Biographical Directory of the United States Congress.
- John Samuel Sherburne at the Biographical Directory of Federal Judges, a publication of the Federal Judicial Center.

U.S. House of Representatives
Preceded by Samuel Livermore	United States Representative from New Hampshire's at-large congressional district 1793–1797	Succeeded by William Gordon
Legal offices
Preceded by John Pickering	Judge of the United States District Court for the District of New Hampshire; 1804–1830	Succeeded by Matthew Harvey
