= Landya B. McCafferty =

American judge (born 1962)

Landya McCafferty
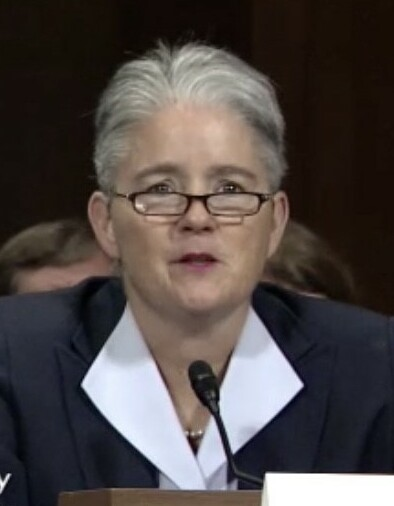
- McCafferty in 2013

Chief Judge of the United States District Court for the District of New Hampshire
- In office November 1, 2018 – October 31, 2025
- Preceded by: Joseph Normand Laplante
- Succeeded by: Samantha D. Elliott

Judge of the United States District Court for the District of New Hampshire
- Incumbent
- Assumed office December 17, 2013
- Appointed by: Barack Obama
- Preceded by: Steven J. McAuliffe

Personal details
- Born: Landya Marie Boyer; 1962 (age 63–64) Washington, D.C., U.S.
- Education: Harvard University (AB); Northeastern University (JD)

Landya Marie Boyer McCafferty (born 1962) is an American attorney serving as a United States district judge of the United States District Court for the District of New Hampshire. She is the first woman to serve as a federal judge of the District Court of New Hampshire.

== Early life and education ==
McCafferty was born Landya Marie Boyer in 1962, in Washington, D.C. She graduated from the Spartanburg Day School in 1980 as the third female in school history to be elected student body president. She received an Artium Baccalaureus degree in 1984, cum laude, from Harvard University. She received a Juris Doctor in 1991 from Northeastern University School of Law.

== Career ==
She worked as a law clerk to Judge Norman H. Stahl, both at the United States District Court for the District of New Hampshire and at the United States Court of Appeals for the First Circuit, following his elevation to that court. From 1993 to 1994, she served as an associate at the law firm of McLane, Graf, Raulerson & Middleton, P.A. From 1994 to 1995, she served as a law clerk to Judge A. David Mazzone of the United States District Court for the District of Massachusetts. She served as a staff attorney for the New Hampshire Public Defender Program from 1995 to 2003. She served as Disciplinary Counsel for the New Hampshire Attorney Discipline Office from 2003 to 2010. In 2010, she was selected as a United States magistrate judge for the District of New Hampshire.

=== Federal judicial service ===
On May 23, 2013, President Barack Obama nominated McCafferty to serve as a United States District Judge of the United States District Court for the District of New Hampshire, to the seat vacated by Judge Steven J. McAuliffe, who assumed senior status on April 1, 2013. On December 12, 2013, the United States Senate invoked cloture on her nomination by a 58–40 vote. McCafferty's nomination was confirmed later that day by a 79–19 vote. McCafferty is the first woman to serve as a district judge of the U.S. District Court for the District of New Hampshire. She received her judicial commission on December 17, 2013. She served as chief judge from 2018 to 2025. She became the first woman to serve as chief judge of the District of New Hampshire.

Legal offices
Preceded by Steven J. McAuliffe	Judge of the United States District Court for the District of New Hampshire; 2013–present	Incumbent
Preceded by Joseph Normand Laplante	Chief Judge of the United States District Court for the District of New Hampshire; 2018–2025	Succeeded by Samantha D. Elliott
