= List of Georgetown alumni =

List of Georgetown alumni may refer to:

- List of Georgetown University alumni, for alumni of the private, Jesuit, research university in Washington, D.C.
  - List of Georgetown University Law Center alumni, for alumni of the law school of Georgetown University
- Georgetown College § Notable alumni, for alumni of the private, Christian, liberal arts college in Kentucky
- List of Georgetown Prep alumni, for alumni of the private, Jesuit, high school for boys in Maryland
- Georgetown Visitation Preparatory School § Notable alumnae, for alumnae of the private, Catholic high school for girls in Washington, D.C.
- Georgetown Day School § Notable alumni, for alumni of the private, secular K-12 school in Washington, D.C.
