= Daniel Clark (New Hampshire politician) =

American judge and politician (1809–1891)

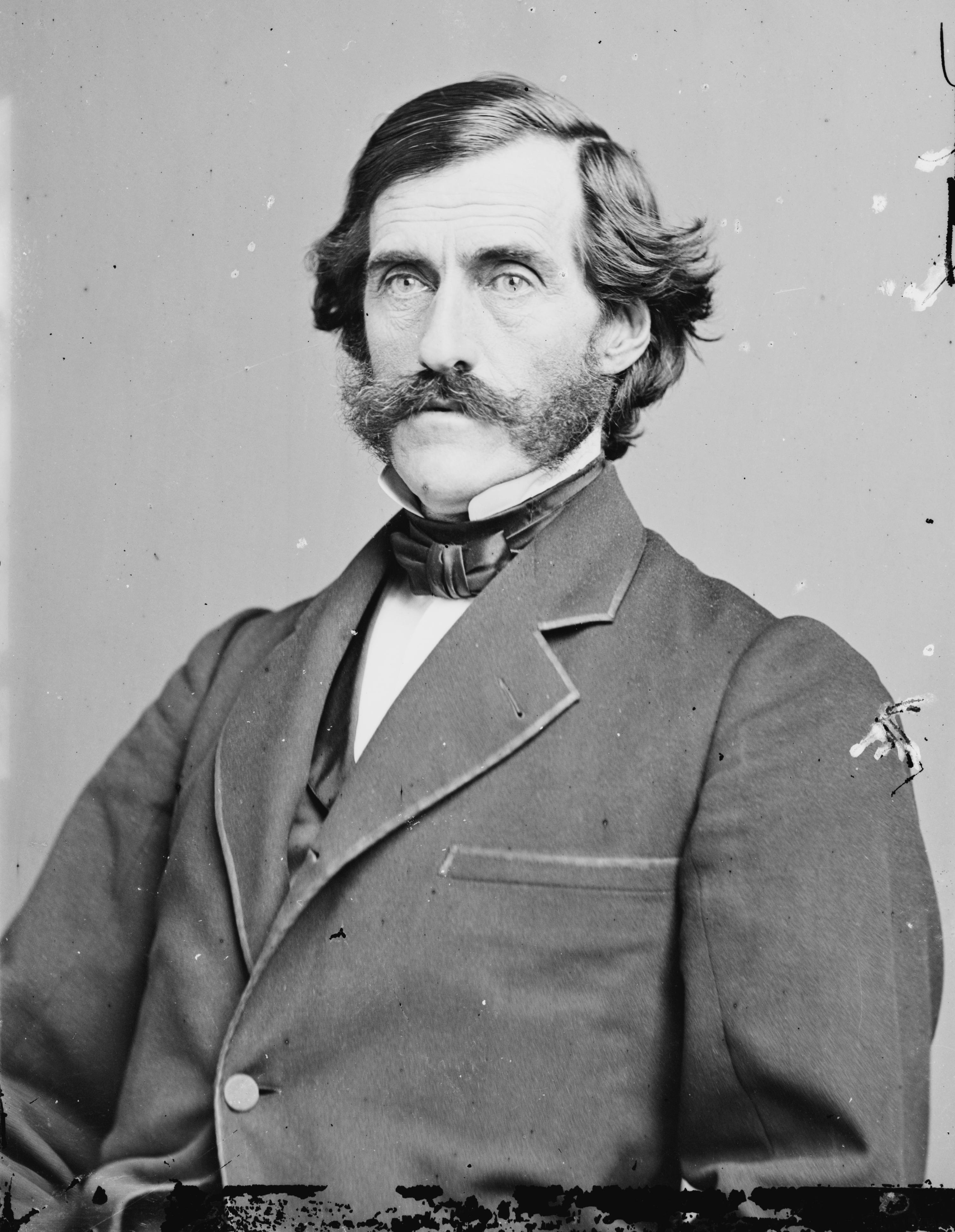
- Clark, 1855–1865

Judge of the United States District Court for the District of New Hampshire
- In office July 27, 1866 – January 2, 1891
- Appointed by: Andrew Johnson
- Preceded by: Matthew Harvey
- Succeeded by: Edgar Aldrich

President pro tempore of the United States Senate
- In office April 26, 1864 – February 19, 1865
- Preceded by: Solomon Foot
- Succeeded by: Lafayette S. Foster

United States Senator from New Hampshire
- In office June 27, 1857 – July 27, 1866
- Preceded by: James Bell
- Succeeded by: George G. Fogg

Member of the New Hampshire House of Representatives
- In office 1842-1843; 1846; 1854-1855

Personal details
- Born: October 24, 1809 Stratham, New Hampshire, US
- Died: January 2, 1891 (aged 81) Manchester, New Hampshire, US
- Party: Republican
- Education: Dartmouth College read law

Daniel Clark (October 24, 1809 – January 2, 1891) was a United States senator from New Hampshire and a United States district judge of the United States District Court for the District of New Hampshire.

== Education and career ==
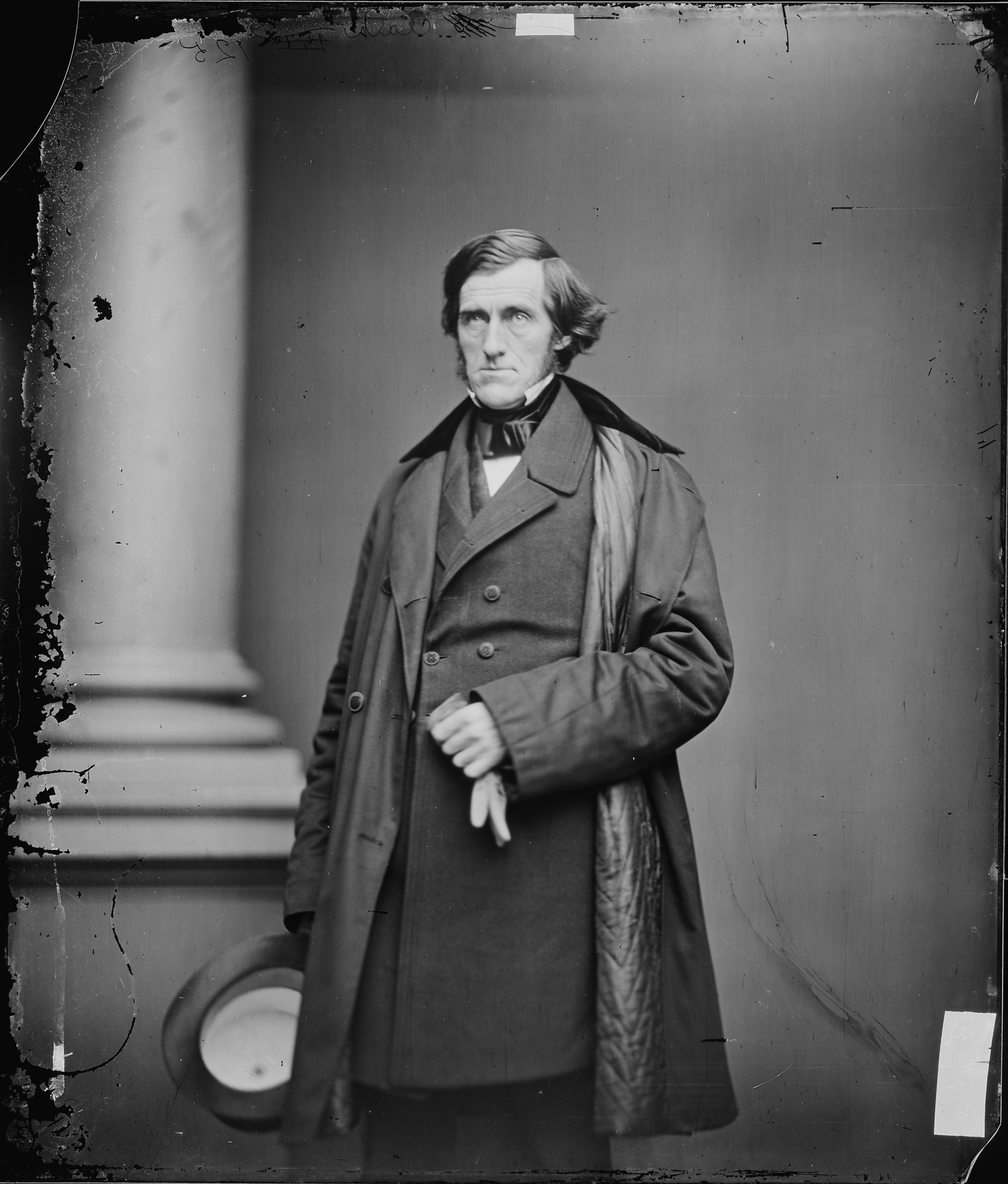
Daniel Clark, photograph by Mathew Brady

Born on October 24, 1809, in Stratham, New Hampshire, Clark attended the common schools Hampton Academy (now New Hampton School) and Union College in Schenectady, New York. He graduated from Dartmouth College in 1834 and read law in 1836. He was admitted to the bar and entered private practice in Epping, New Hampshire from 1836 to 1839. He continued private practice in Manchester, New Hampshire from 1839 to 1842, 1844 to 1846, and from 1847 to 1861. He was a member of the New Hampshire House of Representatives from 1842 to 1843, in 1846, and from 1854 to 1855.

== Congressional service ==
Clark was elected as a Republican to the United States Senate to fill the vacancy caused by the death of United States Senator James Bell. He was reelected in 1861, and served from June 27, 1857, to July 27, 1866, when he resigned to accept a federal judicial post. He served as President pro tempore of the United States Senate during the 38th United States Congress. He was Chairman of the United States Senate Committee on Claims for the 37th and the 38th United States Congress and so much of the 39th United States Congress as preceded his July 27, 1866 resignation to accept a federal judge appointment.

== Federal judicial service ==
Clark was nominated by President Andrew Johnson on July 27, 1866, to a seat on the United States District Court for the District of New Hampshire vacated by Judge Matthew Harvey. He was confirmed by the United States Senate on July 27, 1866, and received his commission the same day. His service terminated on January 2, 1891, due to his death in Manchester.

=== Other service ===
Clark was President of the New Hampshire constitutional convention in 1876.

== Sources ==
- United States Congress. "Daniel Clark (id: C000427)". Biographical Directory of the United States Congress.
- Daniel Clark at the Biographical Directory of Federal Judges, a publication of the Federal Judicial Center.

U.S. Senate
Preceded by James Bell	U.S. senator (Class 3) from New Hampshire; 1857–1866; Served alongside: John P. Hale, Aaron H. Cragin	Succeeded by George G. Fogg
Political offices
Preceded by Solomon Foot	President pro tempore of the United States Senate; 1864–1865	Succeeded by Lafayette S. Foster
Legal offices
Preceded by Matthew Harvey	Judge of the United States District Court for the District of New Hampshire; 1866–1891	Succeeded by Edgar Aldrich
