= Jill R. Horwitz =

Professor of law

Jill R. Horwitz is the Trobman Family Innovation Professor at Northwestern University Pritzker School of Law and Professor of Emergency Medicine, Northwestern Feinberg School of Medicine. She is a faculty expert at the Buehler Center for Health Policy and Economics at Northwestern University.

Horwitz also serves as founding faculty director of the Center for Philanthropy and Nonprofits at UCLA School of Law. She is a research associate at the National Bureau of Economic Research, and adjunct professor of Economics at the University of Victoria, Victoria, British Columbia of Canada.

Horwitz was the reporter for the American Law Institute's first Restatement of the Law, Charitable Nonprofit Organizations.

== Education and training ==
Horwitz graduated from Northwestern University, with a B.A. in History with honors. She holds a J.D. magna cum laude, master's in Public Policy, and Ph.D. in Health Policy from Harvard University. She was a law clerk for Judge Norman H. Stahl of the United States Court of Appeals for the First Circuit (1997–1998).

== Career ==
Before joining Northwestern University in 2025, Horwitz was on the UCLA School of Law faculty from 2012-2025. She was the David Sanders Professor of Law and Medicine at the UCLA School of Law, and served as vice dean of Faculty and Intellectual Life. Horwitz was on the faculty of the University of Michigan Law School from 2003 to 2012. While at the University of Michigan, she was the co-director of the Program in Law and Economics and the Louis and Myrtle Moskowitz Research Professor of Business and Law. She also held appointments at the University of Michigan School of Public Health and the Gerald R. Ford School of Public Policy. She has been a member of the Core Faculties of both the Robert Wood Johnson Clinical and Policy Scholars programs at Michigan.

Among her many appointments, she has been chair of the Board of Advisors of the New York University National Center on Philanthropy and the Law.

Horwitz has written extensively on both nonprofit law and the interconnections among health regulation, economics, and policy. She has published on topics ranging from the effects of nonprofit and for-profit ownership of hospitals on medical service provision to medical technology diffusion and opioid regulation, and has frequently commented on these topics in editorials, testimony to Congress, and the press. Horwitz's publications often attract scholarly and public attention, including her work on hospital ownership and workplace wellness.
