= Joseph A. DiClerico Jr. =

American judge (1941–2022)

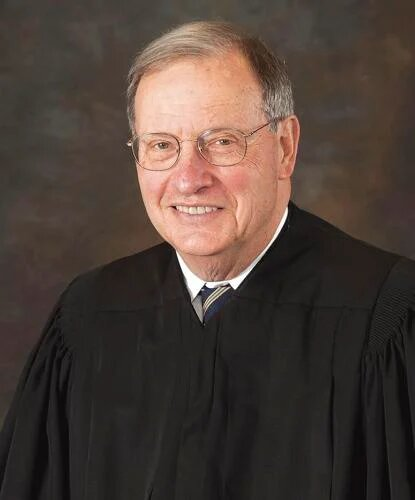

Senior Judge of the United States District Court for the District of New Hampshire
- In office March 15, 2007 – April 2, 2022

Chief Judge of the United States District Court for the District of New Hampshire
- In office 1992–1997
- Preceded by: Shane Devine
- Succeeded by: Paul Barbadoro

Judge of the United States District Court for the District of New Hampshire
- In office August 17, 1992 – March 15, 2007
- Appointed by: George H. W. Bush
- Preceded by: Seat established by 104 Stat. 5089
- Succeeded by: Joseph Normand Laplante

Personal details
- Born: January 30, 1941 Lynn, Massachusetts, U.S.
- Died: April 2, 2022 (aged 81) New London, New Hampshire, U.S.
- Education: Williams College (BA); Yale Law School (LLB)

Joseph Anthony DiClerico Jr. (January 30, 1941 – April 2, 2022) was a United States district judge of the United States District Court for the District of New Hampshire.

== Education and career ==
Born in Lynn, Massachusetts, DiClerico received a Bachelor of Arts from Williams College in 1963 and a Bachelor of Laws from Yale Law School in 1966. He was a law clerk to Judge Aloysius J. Connor of the United States District Court for the District of New Hampshire from 1966 to 1967, and was then a law clerk to the New Hampshire Supreme Court from 1967 to 1968. He was in private practice in Concord, New Hampshire from 1968 to 1970. He was an assistant state attorney general of New Hampshire from 1970 to 1977. He was an associate justice of the New Hampshire Superior Court from 1977 to 1991, and chief justice of that court from 1991 to 1992.

== Federal judicial service ==
On April 9, 1992, DiClerico was nominated by President George H. W. Bush to a new seat on the United States District Court for the District of New Hampshire created by 104 Stat. 5089. He was confirmed by the United States Senate on August 12, 1992, and received his commission on August 17, 1992. He served as Chief Judge from 1992 to 1997. He assumed senior status on March 15, 2007. DiClerico died on April 2, 2022, at the age of 81.

== Sources ==
Legal offices
Preceded by Seat established by 104 Stat. 5089	Judge of the United States District Court for the District of New Hampshire; 1992–2007	Succeeded by Joseph Normand Laplante
Preceded by Shane Devine	Chief Judge of the United States District Court for the District of New Hampshire; 1992–1997	Succeeded by Paul Barbadoro
