= Martin F. Loughlin =

American judge

Martin Francis Loughlin

Senior Judge of the United States District Court for the District of New Hampshire
- In office May 15, 1989 – December 4, 1995

Judge of the United States District Court for the District of New Hampshire
- In office April 26, 1979 – May 15, 1989
- Appointed by: Jimmy Carter
- Preceded by: Seat established by 92 Stat. 1629
- Succeeded by: Norman H. Stahl

Personal details
- Born: Martin Francis Loughlin; March 11, 1923 Manchester, New Hampshire, U.S.
- Died: March 7, 2007 (aged 83) Manchester, New Hampshire, U.S.
- Spouse: Margaret Gallagher Loughlin
- Children: Helen, Margaret, Shane, Mary, Sheila, Martina, Caitlin
- Education: Saint Anselm College (AB); Suffolk University Law School (LLB)

Military service
- Allegiance: United States
- Branch/service: United States Army
- Years of service: 1943–1946; 1951–1952
- Unit: 80th Division; JAG
- Battles/wars: Battle of the Bulge
- Awards: Bronze Star Medal

Martin Francis Loughlin (March 11, 1923 – March 7, 2007) was a United States district judge of the United States District Court for the District of New Hampshire.

== Education and career ==
Loughlin was born in Manchester, New Hampshire and graduated with an Artium Baccalaureus degree from Saint Anselm College in 1947 and received a Bachelor of Laws from Suffolk University Law School in 1951. During World War II Loughlin served in the 80th Division of the United States Army under General George S. Patton from 1943 to 1946. He served as a Judge Advocate (JAG) during the Korean War from 1951 to 1952, stationed at Fort Benning in Georgia. He engaged in private practice in Manchester from 1953 to 1963. From 1963 to 1978, Loughlin served as an associate justice of the New Hampshire Superior Court, and was chief justice from 1978 to 1979.

== Federal judicial service ==
Loughlin was nominated to the United States District Court for the District of New Hampshire by President Jimmy Carter on February 9, 1979, to a new seat created by 92 Stat. 1629. He was confirmed by the United States Senate on April 24, 1979, and received his commission on April 26, 1979. Loughlin assumed senior status due to a certified disability on May 15, 1989, and his service terminated on December 4, 1995, due to retirement.

== Death ==
Loughlin died on March 7, 2007, in Manchester from congestive heart failure. He was survived by his wife of 56 years, Margaret Gallagher Loughlin and seven children.

== Sources ==
Legal offices
Preceded by Seat established by 92 Stat. 1629	Judge of the United States District Court for the District of New Hampshire; 1979–1989	Succeeded by Norman H. Stahl
