= Paul Barbadoro =

American judge (born 1955)

Senior Judge of the United States District Court for the District of New Hampshire
- Incumbent
- Assumed office March 1, 2021

Chief Judge of the United States District Court for the District of New Hampshire
- In office 1997–2004
- Preceded by: Joseph A. Diclerico Jr.
- Succeeded by: Steven J. McAuliffe

Judge of the United States District Court for the District of New Hampshire
- In office October 9, 1992 – March 1, 2021
- Appointed by: George H. W. Bush
- Preceded by: Shane Devine
- Succeeded by: Samantha D. Elliott

Personal details
- Born: Paul James Barbadoro; June 4, 1955 (age 70) Providence, Rhode Island
- Spouse: Inez E. McDermott
- Education: Gettysburg College (BA); Boston College (JD)

Paul James Barbadoro (born June 4, 1955) is a senior United States district judge of the United States District Court for the District of New Hampshire. In July 2016, he was appointed by Chief Justice Roberts as the chair of the executive committee of the Judicial Conference of the United States.

== Early life and education ==
Barbadoro was born in Providence, Rhode Island, and grew up in Acton, Massachusetts. He graduated from Gettysburg College with a Bachelor of Arts degree in 1977 and earned a Juris Doctor from Boston College Law School in 1980.

== Legal career ==
He was a New Hampshire Assistant Attorney General from 1979 to 1984, and was counsel to United States Senator Warren Rudman from 1984 to 1986. After a brief stint in private practice in Concord, New Hampshire, he served as Deputy Chief Counsel to the United States Senate investigative Committee on Secret Military Assistance to Iran and the Nicaraguan Opposition, during the Iran-Contra affair in 1987. He returned to private practice in Concord, New Hampshire from 1986 until he was appointed to the federal bench in 1992. He is also an adjunct Professor of Business Law at the Tuck School of Business at Dartmouth College.

== Federal judicial service ==
At the time of his appointment, Barbadoro was the youngest candidate to ever be appointed as a federal judge. He was nominated by President George H. W. Bush on September 9, 1992, to a seat on the United States District Court for the District of New Hampshire vacated by Judge Shane Devine. He was confirmed by the United States Senate on October 8, 1992, and received his commission the next day. He served as Chief Judge from 1997 to 2004. He assumed senior status on March 1, 2021.

== Other service ==
More recently, in March 2008, Barbadoro was brought in from New Hampshire as a visiting judge to handle the case of former governor of Puerto Rico Aníbal Acevedo Vilá. The governor was indicted on 21 federal charges and due to the extensive coverage of case in the local media it was thought that Barbadoro would be a better choice for the case. On July 13, 2016, United States Supreme Court Chief Justice John Roberts appointed Barbadoro to serve as chair of the Executive Committee of the Judicial Conference of the United States. The Conference meets twice a year to consider administrative and policy issues affecting the court system, and to make recommendations to Congress concerning legislation involving the Judicial Branch.

== Sources ==
Legal offices
Preceded by Shane Devine	Judge of the United States District Court for the District of New Hampshire; 1992–2021	Succeeded by Samantha D. Elliott
Preceded by Joseph A. Diclerico Jr.	Chief Judge of the United States District Court for the District of New Hampshire; 1997–2004	Succeeded by Steven J. McAuliffe
