= Hugh H. Bownes =

American judge (1920–2003)

Hugh Henry Bownes
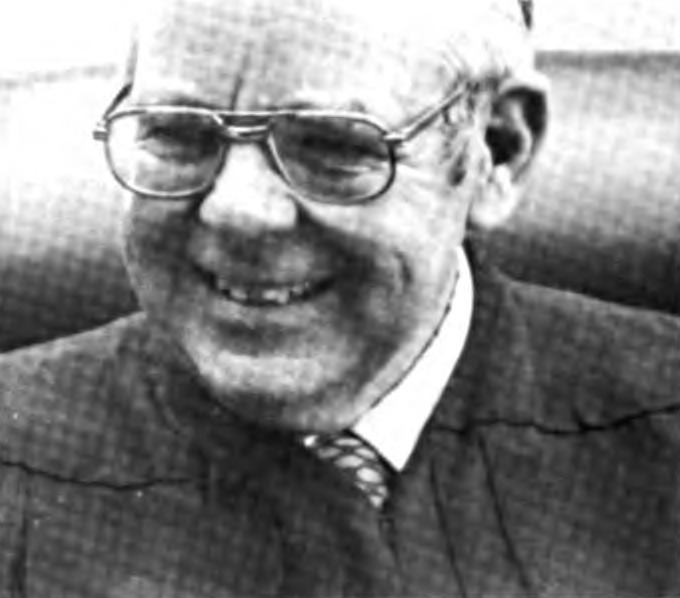

Senior Judge of the United States Court of Appeals for the First Circuit
- In office January 1, 1990 – November 5, 2003

Judge of the United States Court of Appeals for the First Circuit
- In office October 11, 1977 – January 1, 1990
- Appointed by: Jimmy Carter
- Preceded by: Edward McEntee
- Succeeded by: David Souter

Judge of the United States District Court for the District of New Hampshire
- In office July 25, 1968 – October 31, 1977
- Appointed by: Lyndon B. Johnson
- Preceded by: Aloysius Joseph Connor
- Succeeded by: Shane Devine

Personal details
- Born: Hugh Henry Bownes; February 28, 1920 New York City, New York, U.S.
- Died: November 5, 2003 (aged 83) New Haven, Connecticut, U.S.
- Education: Columbia University (BA, LLB)

Hugh Henry Bownes (March 10, 1920 – November 5, 2003) was an American federal judge who served as a United States circuit judge of the United States Court of Appeals for the First Circuit, after previously serving as a United States District Judge of the United States District Court for the District of New Hampshire.

== Education and career ==
Born in New York City, New York, Bownes graduated from Columbia College with a Bachelor of Arts degree in 1941, and after serving in the United States Marine Corps during World War II, graduated from Columbia Law School with a Bachelor of Laws in 1948. Bownes then moved to New Hampshire, where he practiced law for more than 15 years. He served as a city council member and then as mayor of Laconia, New Hampshire. In 1966, he was selected as a member of the Superior Court of New Hampshire, on which he served for two years.

=== Military service ===
Bownes participated in the invasion of Guam. Wounded by mortar fire, he developed gangrene and nearly died. For his service, he received the Silver Star and Purple Heart.

== Federal judicial service ==
Bownes was nominated by President Lyndon B. Johnson on July 17, 1968, to a seat on the United States District Court for the District of New Hampshire vacated by Judge Aloysius Joseph Connor. He was confirmed by the United States Senate on July 25, 1968, and received commission on July 25, 1968. His service terminated on October 31, 1977, due to elevation to the First Circuit.

Bownes was nominated by President Jimmy Carter on September 19, 1977, to a seat on the United States Court of Appeals for the First Circuit vacated by Judge Edward McEntee. He was confirmed by the Senate on October 7, 1977, and received commission on October 11, 1977. He assumed senior status on January 1, 1990. His service terminated on November 5, 2003, due to his death from pneumonia in New Haven, Connecticut. He had suffered a stroke in September of that year.

== Sources ==
- Columbia College Obituary (see under "1941")
- New Hampshire Bar Association Obituary

Legal offices
Preceded by Aloysius Joseph Connor	Judge of the United States District Court for the District of New Hampshire; 1968–1977	Succeeded by Shane Devine
Preceded by Edward McEntee	Judge of the United States Court of Appeals for the First Circuit; 1977–1990	Succeeded by David Souter
