= William Weir Stickney =

American politician

Judge of Probate for Rockingham County, New Hampshire

16th United States Attorney for the District of New Hampshire
- In office 1850–1853
- Preceded by: Josiah Minot
- Succeeded by: John H. George

Member of the New Hampshire House of Representatives for Exeter, New Hampshire
- In office 1855–1855

Member of the New Hampshire House of Representatives for Newmarket, New Hampshire
- In office 1839–1841

Personal details
- Born: June 24, 1801 Enfield, New Hampshire
- Died: March 16, 1888 Exeter, New Hampshire
- Spouse(s): Frances A. Hough, m. November 5, 1860.
- Education: Dartmouth
- Occupation: Attorney

William Weir Stickney (24 Jun 1801 – 16 Mar 1888) was an American attorney and politician who served as the United States Attorney for the District of New Hampshire.

== Biography ==
Stickney was born on June 24, 1801, in Enfield, New Hampshire, to Daniel and Sarah (Morse) Stickney. He graduated from Dartmouth College in 1823. He was admitted to the New Hampshire bar in 1826. Stickney practiced law in Concord, Newmarket, and Exeter, New Hampshire.

Stickney served twice in the New Hampshire House of Representatives. He represented Newmarket from 1839 to 1841, and Exeter in 1855.

In 1849, Stickney was appointed the United States Attorney for the District of New Hampshire. In 1857, Stickney was appointed the Judge Probate of Rockingham County, New Hampshire.

Stickney married Frances A. Hough on November 5, 1860. The couple had three children.

Legal offices
Preceded by Josiah Minot	16th United States Attorney for the District of New Hampshire; 1850-1853	Succeeded by John H. George
