= George Franklin Morris =

American judge

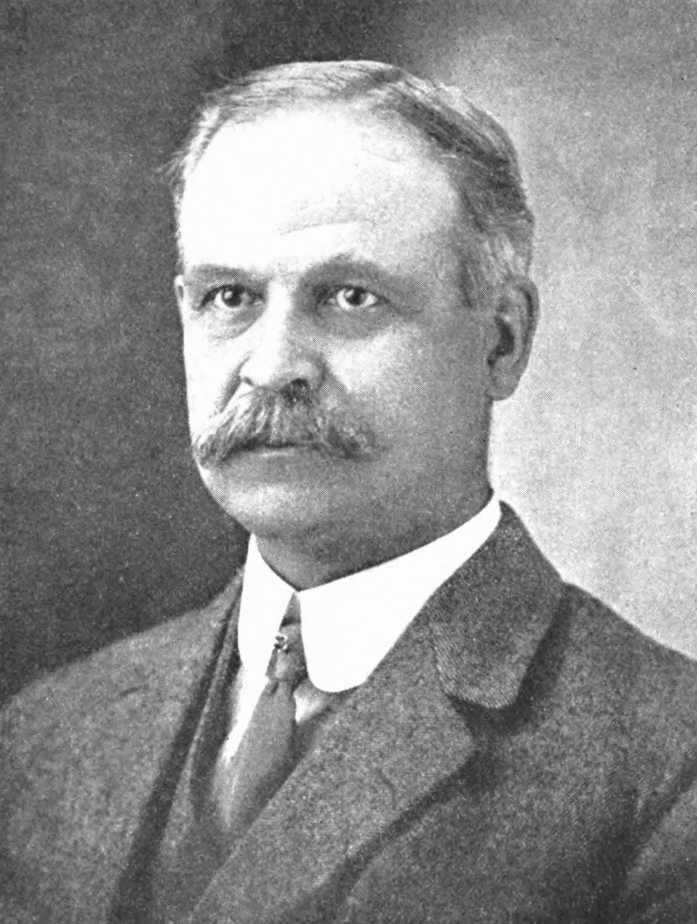

Senior Judge of the United States District Court for the District of New Hampshire
- In office April 30, 1943 – March 25, 1953

Judge of the United States District Court for the District of New Hampshire
- In office October 25, 1921 – April 30, 1943
- Appointed by: Warren G. Harding
- Preceded by: Edgar Aldrich
- Succeeded by: Aloysius Joseph Connor

Member of the New Hampshire House of Representatives
- In office 1905

Personal details
- Born: April 13, 1866 Vershire, Vermont
- Died: March 25, 1953 (aged 86) North Carolina
- Spouse: Lula J. Aldrich (m. 1894)
- Children: 1
- Education: read law
- Occupation: Jurist

George Franklin Morris (April 13, 1866 – March 25, 1953) was a United States district judge of the United States District Court for the District of New Hampshire.

== Education and career ==
George Franklin Morris was born in Vershire, Vermont on April 13, 1866. He read law to enter the bar in 1891. He married Lula J. Aldrich on May 16, 1894, and they had one son.

He was in private practice in Lisbon, New Hampshire from 1891 to 1906, and in Lancaster, New Hampshire from 1906 to 1921. He was also the County Solicitor for Grafton County, New Hampshire from 1897 to 1901, and a member of the New Hampshire House of Representatives in 1905. In 1917, he was president of the New Hampshire Bar Association.

== Federal judicial service ==
On October 20, 1921, Morris was nominated by President Warren G. Harding to a seat on the United States District Court for the District of New Hampshire vacated by Judge Edgar Aldrich. Morris was confirmed by the United States Senate on October 25, 1921, and received his commission the same day. He assumed senior status on April 30, 1943, serving in that capacity until his death March 25, 1953, in North Carolina.

Legal offices
Preceded by Edgar Aldrich	Judge of the United States District Court for the District of New Hampshire; 1921–1943	Succeeded by Aloysius Joseph Connor
