= Peter Woodbury =

American judge (1899–1970)

Senior Judge of the United States Court of Appeals for the First Circuit
- In office December 31, 1964 – November 17, 1970

Chief Judge of the United States Court of Appeals for the First Circuit
- In office 1959–1964
- Preceded by: Calvert Magruder
- Succeeded by: Bailey Aldrich

Judge of the United States Court of Appeals for the First Circuit
- In office February 25, 1941 – December 31, 1964
- Appointed by: Franklin D. Roosevelt
- Preceded by: Scott Wilson
- Succeeded by: Edward McEntee

Associate Justice of the New Hampshire Supreme Court
- In office 1933–1941

Personal details
- Born: Peter Woodbury; October 24, 1899 Bedford, New Hampshire
- Died: November 17, 1970 (aged 71) Bedford, New Hampshire
- Education: Harvard University (BS, LLB)

Peter Woodbury (October 24, 1899 – November 17, 1970) was a United States circuit judge of the United States Court of Appeals for the First Circuit.

== Biography ==
Woodbury was born in Bedford, New Hampshire. He received a Bachelor of Science degree from Harvard University in 1924. He attended Columbia Law School before transferring to Harvard. He received a Bachelor of Laws degree from Harvard Law School in 1927. He was in the United States Army Private First Class, 27th Army Division from 1918 to 1919. He was in private practice of law in Manchester, New Hampshire, from 1927 until the early 1930s. He was a Selectman, Bedford, New Hampshire from 1928 to 1931. He was a Justice, Bedford Municipal Court, New Hampshire from 1928 to 1932. He was an Associate Justice, New Hampshire Superior Court from 1932 to 1933. He was an Associate Justice, New Hampshire Supreme Court from 1933 to 1941.

== Federal judicial service ==
Woodbury was nominated by President Franklin D. Roosevelt on January 31, 1941, to a seat on the United States Court of Appeals for the First Circuit vacated by Judge Scott Wilson. He was confirmed by the United States Senate on February 18, 1941, and received his commission on February 25, 1941. He served as Chief Judge from 1959 to 1964. He assumed senior status on December 31, 1964, serving in that status until his death on November 17, 1970, in Bedford.

== Later life ==
On December 7, 1960, Woodbury was injured when the train he was traveling on collided with a bottled gas truck. Six people were killed in the accident, one of whom was Woodbury's law clerk at the time.

The elementary school in Bedford is named both for him and for his great-grandfather, Peter P. Woodbury.

== Sources ==
Legal offices
Preceded by Scott Wilson	Judge of the United States Court of Appeals for the First Circuit; 1941–1964	Succeeded by Edward McEntee
Preceded by Calvert Magruder	Chief Judge of the United States Court of Appeals for the First Circuit; 1959–1964	Succeeded by Bailey Aldrich
