= Charles H. Burns =

American politician

Charles Henry Burns
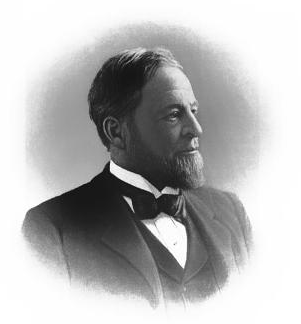

23rd United States Attorney for the District of New Hampshire
- In office 1881–1885
- Preceded by: Ossian Ray
- Succeeded by: John Samuel Hatch Frink

Member of the New Hampshire State Senate
- In office 1873–1873

Member of the New Hampshire State Senate
- In office 1879–1879

Treasurer of Hillsborough County, New Hampshire
- In office 1864–1865

Personal details
- Born: January 19, 1835 Milford, New Hampshire
- Died: May 22, 1909 (aged 74) Wilton, New Hampshire
- Party: Republican
- Spouse(s): Sarah N. Mills, m. January 19, 1856
- Education: Harvard Law School, 1858.
- Occupation: Attorney
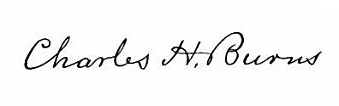
- Signature

Charles Henry Burns (January 19, 1835 – May 22, 1909) was an American attorney and politician who served in the New Hampshire Senate and as the United States Attorney for the District of New Hampshire.

== Early life ==
Burns was born in Milford, Massachusetts, to Charles A. and Elizabeth (Hutchinson) Burns on January 19, 1835. He spent his early life on his father's farm. From the age of seventeen, to when he was twenty one, Burns taught school in Ashby, Massachusetts, New Ipswich, New Hampshire, and Lyndeborough, New Hampshire.

== Early legal career ==
Burns graduated from Harvard Law School in 1858. In May 1858 he was admitted to the Massachusetts Bar at Suffolk County, Massachusetts. Early in 1859, Burns was admitted to the New Hampshire Bar, and in January 1859 he began practicing law in Wilton, New Hampshire.

== Family life ==
Burns married Sarah N. Mills on January 19, 1856. They had eight children.

== Public service ==
=== County Solicitor ===
In 1864 and 1865, Burns was appointed as the County Treasurer of Hillsborough County, New Hampshire.

=== County Treasurer ===
In 1876, Burns was appointed as the County Solicitor of Hillsborough County, New Hampshire. Burns was subsequently elected twice to this position after the state constitution was changed to make this an elective office.

=== New Hampshire Senate ===
Burns was a member of the New Hampshire Senate in 1873 and in 1879. Burns was the Chairman of the Judiciary Committee during both of his terms in the Senate.

=== US Attorney ===
In February 1881, Burns was appointed the United States Attorney for the District of New Hampshire. Burns was reappointed in February 1881, he served as United States Attorney for six years because he resigned in his second term.

== Death ==
Burns died at Wilton, New Hampshire, on May 22, 1909.

Political offices
| Preceded by | Member of the New Hampshire State Senate; 1873-1873 | Succeeded by |
| Preceded by | Member of the New Hampshire State Senate; 1879-1879 | Succeeded by |
Legal offices
| Preceded by Ossian Ray | 23rd United States Attorney for the District of New Hampshire; 1881–1885 | Succeeded by John Samuel Hatch Frink |
