= Edward McEntee =

American judge (1906–1981)

Senior Judge of the United States Court of Appeals for the First Circuit
- In office December 31, 1976 – February 14, 1981

Judge of the United States Court of Appeals for the First Circuit
- In office September 1, 1965 – December 31, 1976
- Appointed by: Lyndon B. Johnson
- Preceded by: Peter Woodbury
- Succeeded by: Hugh H. Bownes

Personal details
- Born: October 21, 1906 Providence, Rhode Island, U.S.
- Died: February 14, 1981 (aged 74)
- Education: College of the Holy Cross (BA); Boston University (LLB)

Edward Matthew McEntee (October 21, 1906 – February 14, 1981) was a United States circuit judge of the United States Court of Appeals for the First Circuit.

== Education and career ==
McEntee was born in Providence, Rhode Island, on October 21, 1906. He was educated at the College of the Holy Cross, where he received a Bachelor of Arts in 1928. He received a Bachelor of Laws from Boston University School of Law in 1933.

McEntee was in the private practice of law in Providence from 1933 to 1952. He was a Member of the Rhode Island House of Representatives from 1935 to 1939. He was an Assistant United States Attorney of the District of Rhode Island from 1940 to 1951. He was the United States Attorney for the District of Rhode Island from 1952 to 1953.

== Federal judicial service ==
McEntee was nominated by President Lyndon B. Johnson on August 3, 1965, to a seat on the United States Court of Appeals for the First Circuit vacated by Judge Peter Woodbury. He was confirmed by the United States Senate on August 31, 1965, and received his commission on September 1, 1965. He assumed senior status on December 31, 1976. His service was terminated on February 14, 1981, due to his death.

== Sources ==
Legal offices
Preceded by Peter Woodbury	Judge of the United States Court of Appeals for the First Circuit; 1965–1976	Succeeded by Hugh H. Bownes
