= John Pickering (judge) =

American judge (1737–1805)

Judge of the United States District Court for the District of New Hampshire
- In office February 11, 1795 – March 12, 1804
- Appointed by: George Washington
- Preceded by: John Sullivan
- Succeeded by: John Samuel Sherburne

Personal details
- Born: September 22, 1737 Newington, New Hampshire, British America
- Died: April 11, 1805 (aged 67) Portsmouth, New Hampshire, U.S.
- Resting place: Old North Cemetery
- Education: Harvard University (BA)

John Pickering (September 22, 1737 – April 11, 1805) was President of New Hampshire, Chief Justice of the New Hampshire Superior Court of Judicature and a United States district judge of the United States District Court for the District of New Hampshire. He was the second federal official impeached by the United States House of Representatives and the first person convicted and removed from office in an impeachment trial by the United States Senate.

== Education and career ==
Born on September 22, 1737, in Newington, Province of New Hampshire, British America, Pickering graduated from Harvard University in 1761 and read law. He entered private practice in Greenland, Province of New Hampshire and continued private practice in Portsmouth, Province of New Hampshire (State of New Hampshire, United States from July 4, 1776) until 1783, and later resumed private practice in Portsmouth from 1788 to 1790. He was a member of New Hampshire constitutional conventions from 1781 to 1783, and from 1791 to 1792. He was a member of the New Hampshire House of Representatives from 1783 to 1787. He was a member of the New Hampshire convention to ratify the United States Constitution in 1788. He was a member of the New Hampshire Senate and a member of the Executive Council of New Hampshire until 1790. He was President of New Hampshire (now Governor of New Hampshire) in 1790. He was chief justice of the New Hampshire Superior Court of Judicature from 1790 to 1795.

== Federal judicial service ==
Pickering was nominated by President George Washington on February 10, 1795, to a seat on the United States District Court for the District of New Hampshire vacated by Judge John Sullivan. He was confirmed by the United States Senate on February 11, 1795, and received his commission the same day. His service terminated on March 12, 1804, due to his impeachment and conviction.

=== Circumstances of his impeachment ===
By 1800, Pickering had begun to show definite signs of mental deterioration. This became severe enough of an impediment that on April 25, 1801, court staff wrote to the judges of the United States Circuit Court for the First Circuit (Note: This was a United States circuit court created along with the Judiciary Act of 1801—otherwise called the Midnight Judges Act—which had moved from the three-circuit grouping embodied in the Judiciary Act of 1789 (Eastern, Middle, and Southern Circuits) to a six-circuit grouping (First through Sixth Circuits).) requesting that they send a temporary replacement. The First Circuit appointed Jeremiah Smith, circuit judge, pursuant to § 25 of the Judiciary Act of 1801 to take over Pickering's caseload.

With the passage of the Judiciary Act of 1802, which explicitly repealed the 1801 Act, (Note: The six-circuit system was retained, though because the 1802 Act expressly repealed the 1801 Act, its provisions formed "new" judicial circuits whose boundaries were—except for the classification of district courts in Maine, Kentucky and Tennessee—identical to those in the 1801 Act.) there were no more circuit judgeships (Note: The 1802 Act, § 4, specified that the circuit court would be held by the district judge for the district where court was to be held, and by an allotted Supreme Court justice who would be riding circuit. That is, when the First Circuit would hold its two annual sessions in New Hampshire, Judge Pickering and Justice William Cushing were to preside.) and the circuit courts' powers were reverted to what they were prior to the 1802 Act.

On February 3, 1803, President Thomas Jefferson sent evidence to the United States House of Representatives against Pickering, accusing him of having made unlawful rulings and being of bad moral character due to intoxication while on the bench. The charges arose in connection with a libel for unpaid duties against the Eliza. The House voted to impeach Pickering on March 2, 1803, on charges of drunkenness and unlawful rulings. Political controversy raged, with Federalists accusing Democratic-Republicans of trying to usurp the Constitution by attempting to remove the judge from office, although he had committed neither "high crimes nor misdemeanors", which are grounds for impeachment under the Constitution.

The United States Senate tried Pickering in absentia, beginning January 4, 1804. The Senate convicted Pickering of all charges by a vote of 19 to 7 on March 12, 1804, thereby immediately removing him from office.

== Death ==
Pickering died on April 11, 1805, in Portsmouth. He was interred in Old North Cemetery in Portsmouth.

== Membership ==
Pickering was elected a Fellow of the American Academy of Arts and Sciences in 1791.

== Notes ==
Legal offices
| Preceded by John Sullivan | Judge of the United States District Court for the District of New Hampshire; 1795–1804 | Succeeded by John Samuel Sherburne |
