= Shane Devine =

American judge

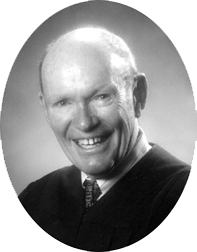

Senior Judge of the United States District Court for the District of New Hampshire
- In office September 8, 1992 – February 22, 1999

Chief Judge of the United States District Court for the District of New Hampshire
- In office 1979 – September 8, 1992
- Preceded by: Office established
- Succeeded by: Joseph A. Diclerico Jr.

Judge of the United States District Court for the District of New Hampshire
- In office July 27, 1978 – September 8, 1992
- Appointed by: Jimmy Carter
- Preceded by: Hugh H. Bownes
- Succeeded by: Paul Barbadoro

Personal details
- Born: Shane Devine; February 1, 1926 Manchester, New Hampshire
- Died: February 22, 1999 (aged 73) Virgin Gorda, British Virgin Islands
- Spouse(s): Mary E. Beebe (m. 1952, died 1985); Priscilla R. Greenhalge (m. 1990)
- Children: 7
- Education: University of New Hampshire (BA); Boston College (JD)

Military service
- Branch/service: United States Army
- Years of service: 1944–1945
- Battles/wars: World War II

Shane Devine (February 1, 1926 – February 22, 1999) was a United States district judge of the United States District Court for the District of New Hampshire.

== Education and career ==
Born in Manchester, New Hampshire, Devine was in the United States Army during World War II, from 1944 to 1945. He attended the United States Military Academy from 1945 to 1946. He received a Bachelor of Arts degree from the University of New Hampshire in 1949 and a Juris Doctor from Boston College Law School in 1952. He was in private practice in Manchester from 1952 to 1978.

== Federal judicial service ==
On May 17, 1978, Devine was nominated by President Jimmy Carter to a seat on the United States District Court for the District of New Hampshire vacated by Judge Hugh H. Bownes. Devine was confirmed by the United States Senate on June 23, 1978, and received his commission on June 27, 1978. He served as Chief Judge from 1979 to 1992. He assumed senior status on September 8, 1992 and served in that capacity until his death on February 22, 1999.

== Sources ==
Legal offices
Preceded by Hugh H. Bownes	Judge of the United States District Court for the District of New Hampshire; 1978–1992	Succeeded by Paul Barbadoro
Preceded by Office established	Chief Judge of the United States District Court for the District of New Hampshire; 1979–1992	Succeeded by Joseph A. Diclerico Jr.
