= Samantha D. Elliott =

American judge (born 1975)

Samantha Elliott
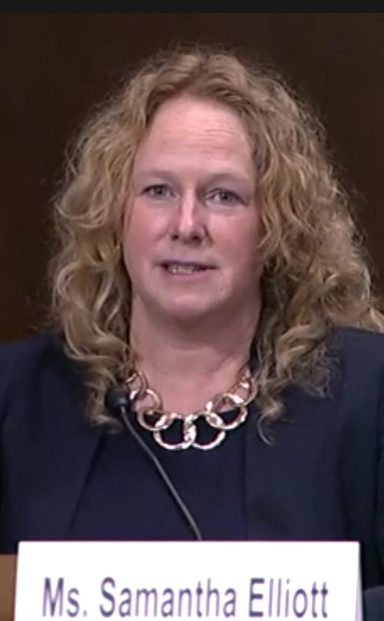

Chief Judge of the United States District Court for the District of New Hampshire
- Incumbent
- Assumed office November 1, 2025
- Preceded by: Landya B. McCafferty

Judge of the United States District Court for the District of New Hampshire
- Incumbent
- Assumed office December 21, 2021
- Appointed by: Joe Biden
- Preceded by: Paul Barbadoro

Personal details
- Born: 1975 (age 50–51) Orange, New Jersey, U.S.
- Education: Colgate University (BA); Columbia University (JD)

Samantha Dowd Elliott (born 1975) is an American lawyer from New Hampshire serving as the chief United States district judge of the United States District Court for the District of New Hampshire.

== Education ==
Elliott received a Bachelor of Arts, cum laude, from Colgate University in 1997 and a Juris Doctor from Columbia Law School in 2006.

== Career ==
From 2006 until 2021, Elliott was a partner and vice president at Gallagher, Callahan & Gartrell, P.C., in Concord, New Hampshire. While at the law firm, she served as president from 2015 to 2020 and as a hiring partner from 2014 to 2019.

She has been a member of New Hampshire Legal Assistance and the Legal Advice Referral Center. In June 2021, she became co-chair of the founding board of directors for 603 Legal Aid, an entity created by merging two other statewide legal aid groups.

== Federal judicial service ==
On September 30, 2021, President Joe Biden nominated Elliott to serve as a federal district judge of the U.S. District Court for the District of New Hampshire. Biden nominated Elliott to the seat vacated by Judge Paul Barbadoro, who assumed senior status on March 1, 2021. On November 3, 2021, a hearing on her nomination was held before the Senate Judiciary Committee. On December 2, 2021, her nomination was reported out of committee by a 15–7 vote. On December 14, 2021, the United States Senate invoked cloture on her nomination by a 59–40 vote. On December 15, 2021, she was confirmed by a 62–37 vote. She received her judicial commission on December 21, 2021. She was sworn into office on December 22, 2021. She became chief judge on November 1, 2025.

Legal offices
Preceded by Paul Barbadoro	Judge of the United States District Court for the District of New Hampshire; 2021–present	Incumbent
Preceded by Landya B. McCafferty	Chief Judge of the United States District Court for the District of New Hampshire; 2025–present	Incumbent
