= Dominique Shelton Leipzig =

American attorney, author, and technology entrepreneur

- Occupations: Attorney, Technology entrepreneur, Author
- Organizations: Global Data Innovation (Founder & CEO); Mayer Brown (Former Partner 2022-2024); Perkins Coie (Former Partner 2018-2022); Alston & Bird (Former Partner); Edwards Wildman Palmer (Former Partner)
- Known for: Data privacy, cybersecurity, AI governance
- Awards: IAPP Global Vanguard Award; IAPP Diversity in Privacy Award; Forbes 50 over 50 : Innovation; GetAbstract International Book Award
- Website: dominiquesheltonleipzig.com

Dominique Shelton Leipzig is an American attorney, author, and technology entrepreneur specializing in data privacy, cybersecurity, and artificial intelligence governance. She is the founder and CEO of Global Data Innovation. Shelton Leipzig is also the co-founder and Co-CEO of NxtWork.

== Early life and education ==
Shelton Leipzig completed her undergraduate degree in International Relations and French Civilization at Brown University in 1988. While completing undergraduate studies, she also spent a year In France, studying at Lumière University Lyon 2 and Sciences Po. In 1991, she obtained her J.D. degree from Georgetown University Law Center.

== Career ==
Shelton Leipzig specializes in AI governance, privacy and cybersecurity law. She has represented technology firms including Amazon (company), Microsoft, and Meta in the domain of cybersecurity laws and privacy. She is a current member of the AI Governance Center Advisory Board and the founder and CEO of Global Data Innovation. Shelton Leipzig has also trained over 50,000 professionals on privacy, AI, and cybersecurity, including Fortune 100 CEOs and board members.

During her tenure at Perkins Coie, Shelton Leipzig chaired the company's Global Data Innovation Team and co-chaired its Ad Tech Privacy & Data Management group.

In 2020, she co-founded NxtWork, a non-profit organization that aims to diversify corporate leadership by promoting women inclusion, with Christine Lawton and Jenny Kim.

In 2022, Shelton Leipzig joined Mayer Brown as a partner in the Cybersecurity & Data Privacy practice, where she headed the firm's AdTech privacy and data management team, also founding its Global Data Innovation team.

Shelton Leipzig is a recipient of two industry awards—a Global Vanguard Award (2024) and a Diversity in Privacy Award (2024) from the International Association of Privacy Professionals (IAPP).

=== Global Data Innovation ===
Shelton Leipzig is the founder and CEO of Global Data Innovation, a legal advisory firm that coaches CEOs and board members on how to address the challenges in the fields of digital transformation and data governance. In 2023, she founded the Digital Trust Summit, which was held at Watson Institute for International and Public Affairs. In 2024, the organization held its second annual Digital Trust Summit at Brown University. The speakers included Brian Moynihan, Lesley Stahl, Senator Amy Klobuchar, Senator Jack Reed, Amandeep Gill, Aldo Carrascoso, and others.

== Notable cases ==
- In 2014, she represented The Aaron's Company in defending a privacy investigation by the California Attorney General.
- In 2016, Shelton Leipzig represented Wendy's in managing a data breach and defending against subsequent litigation.
- In 2020, she represented the CEO of the California Chamber of Commerce in a six-week negotiation with Alastair Mactaggart, a proponent of the California Consumer Privacy Act (CCPA), which led to the implementation of the California Privacy Rights Act (CPRA).
- She advised Meta Platforms and Microsoft, advising on how to comply with regulations like General Data Protection Regulation (GDPR) and CCPA.

== Selected publications ==
=== Books ===
- Shelton Leipzig, Dominique (2023). Trust.: Responsible AI, Innovation, Privacy and Data Leadership. Forbes Books. p. 399. ISBN 9798887501734.
- Shelton Leipzig, Dominique (2019). Transform: Data as a Pre-tangible Asset for a Post-data World (The Leader's Playbook). ASIN B07PNKM9SN.
- Shelton Leipzig, Dominique (2020). Implementing the CCPA: A Guide for Global Business. International Association of Privacy Professionals. ISBN 978-1948771450.

=== Notable op-eds ===
Dominique Shelton Leipzig has written on critical market and policy developments in publications such as the Financial Times and Barron's. In September 2020, she authored an op-ed urging the US to capitalize on opportunities to end the standoff over international data-sharing, highlighting how enhanced clarity on data regulations could spur global economic growth. In a more recent piece, Leipzig discussed the addition of DoorDash, Williams-Sonoma, and TKO stock to the S&P 500, illustrating the dynamic shifts in market indices and their broader economic impact.
