= Edgar Aldrich =

American judge

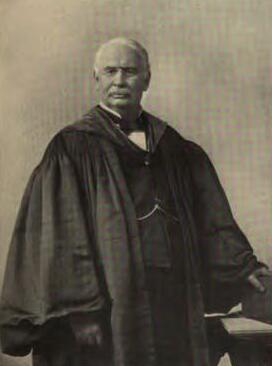

Judge of the United States District Court for the District of New Hampshire
- In office February 20, 1891 – September 15, 1921
- Appointed by: Benjamin Harrison
- Preceded by: Daniel Clark
- Succeeded by: George Franklin Morris

Member of the New Hampshire House of Representatives
- In office 1884-1885

Personal details
- Born: Edgar Aldrich; February 5, 1848 Pittsburg, New Hampshire
- Died: September 15, 1921 (aged 73) Littleton, New Hampshire
- Spouse: Louise M. Remick (m. 1872)
- Education: University of Michigan Law School (LL.B.) read law
- Occupation: lawyer, judge

Edgar Aldrich (February 5, 1848 – September 15, 1921) was a United States district judge of the United States District Court for the District of New Hampshire.

== Education and career ==
Aldrich was born in Pittsburg, New Hampshire, Aldrich read law in 1866 and received a Bachelor of Laws from University of Michigan Law School in 1868. He was in private practice of law in Colebrook, New Hampshire, from 1868 to 1881, also serving as a county solicitor for Coos County, New Hampshire from 1872 to 1879.

Aldrich married Louise M. Remick, on October 7, 1872. He was in private practice in Littleton, New Hampshire, from 1881 to 1889, He was a member of the New Hampshire House of Representatives, from 1884 to 1885, and speaker in 1885 in state there.

He received from Dartmouth College the Master of Arts degree in 1891, and an LL.D. in 1901.

== Federal judicial service ==
Aldrich was nominated by President Benjamin Harrison on February 16, 1891, to a seat on the United States District Court for the District of New Hampshire vacated by Judge Daniel Clark. Aldrich was confirmed by the United States Senate on February 20, 1891, and received his commission the same day. Aldrich served until his death on September 15, 1921, in Littleton.

In 1910, Aldrich was also president of the New Hampshire Bar Association.

Legal offices
| Preceded by Daniel Clark | Judge of the United States District Court for the District of New Hampshire; 1891–1921 | Succeeded by George Franklin Morris |
