= Scott W. Murray =

American attorney (born 1954)

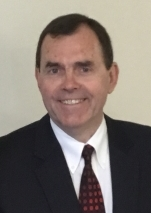

United States Attorney for the District of New Hampshire
- In office March 5, 2018 – March 6, 2021
- President: Donald Trump; Joe Biden
- Preceded by: Emily Gray Rice
- Succeeded by: John J. Farley (acting)

Personal details
- Born: 1954 (age 71–72) Rochester, New Hampshire, U.S.
- Education: University of New Hampshire; University of New Hampshire School of Law

Scott Walter Murray (born 1954) is an American attorney who served as the United States Attorney for the District of New Hampshire from 2018 to 2021. Prior to assuming his current role, he was the Merrimack County Attorney in New Hampshire. From 1983 to 2011, Murray served as the chief prosecutor for the city of Concord, New Hampshire. Murray was confirmed to be a U.S. Attorney on February 15, 2018, and sworn into office on March 5, 2018. On February 8, 2021, he along with 55 other Trump-era attorneys were asked to resign. On March 2, 2021, Murray announced his resignation, effective March 6, 2021.
