= Emily Gray Rice =

American attorney

United States Attorney for the District of New Hampshire
- In office January 11, 2016 – March 10, 2017
- President: Barack Obama; Donald Trump
- Succeeded by: Scott W. Murray

Personal details
- Born: October 11, 1955 (age 70) Boston, Massachusetts, U.S.
- Children: Phoebe Axtman, Sophia Axtman
- Education: Boston University (BA, MA); Northeastern University (JD)

Emily Gray Rice (born October 11, 1955) is an American attorney. She served as United States Attorney for the District of New Hampshire.

== Early life and education ==
Rice was born in Boston, Massachusetts on October 11, 1955. She received her Bachelor of Arts, cum laude, in 1977 from Boston University, her Master of Arts in 1979 from Boston University, and her Juris Doctor in 1984 from Northeastern University School of Law.

== Legal career ==
From 1984 to 1993, she served in the New Hampshire Attorney General's Office in the Bureau of Civil Law, where she served as Senior Assistant Attorney General and Chief of the Bureau of Civil Law from 1989 to 1993. From 1993 to 2001, she worked at the law firm of Dean, Rice & Kane, P.A., where she was elevated to shareholder in 1995. From 2001 to 2012, she was a shareholder in the law firm of Orr & Reno, P.A.. From 2012 to 2015 she was a shareholder in the law firm of Bernstein, Shur, Sawyer & Nelson, P.A. where she practiced civil litigation in a variety of subject matters.

== United States Attorney ==
On October 8, 2015 President Barack Obama nominated Rice to be the United States Attorney for the District of New Hampshire. On December 10, 2015 her nomination was reported out of committee by voice vote. On December 15, 2015, her nomination was confirmed by the full United States Senate by voice vote. She was sworn into office on January 11, 2016. She resigned from her post on March 10, 2017.

== See also ==
- 2017 dismissal of U.S. attorneys
