= Joseph Normand Laplante =

American judge (born 1965)

Chief Judge of the United States District Court for the District of New Hampshire
- In office 2011 – October 31, 2018
- Preceded by: Steven J. McAuliffe
- Succeeded by: Landya B. McCafferty

Judge of the United States District Court for the District of New Hampshire
- Incumbent
- Assumed office December 28, 2007
- Appointed by: George W. Bush
- Preceded by: Joseph A. Diclerico Jr.

Personal details
- Born: Joseph Normand Laplante; July 27, 1965 (age 60) Nashua, New Hampshire, U.S.
- Education: Georgetown University (AB, JD)

Joseph Normand Laplante (born July 27, 1965) is an American attorney and jurist serving as a United States district judge of the United States District Court for the District of New Hampshire.

== Early life and education ==
Laplante was born in Nashua, New Hampshire. He received an Artium Baccalaureus degree from Georgetown University in 1987. He received a Juris Doctor from the Georgetown University Law School in 1990.

== Career ==
Laplante worked in private practice in New Hampshire, from 1990 to 1993. He was a senior assistant attorney general in the Office of the Attorney General of the State of New Hampshire, from 1993 to 1998. He was a trial attorney in the Criminal Division of the United States Department of Justice, from 1998 to 1999. He was an assistant United States attorney in the United States Attorney's Office for the District of Massachusetts from 2000 to 2002 and served as first assistant United States attorney in the United States Attorney's Office for the District of New Hampshire from 2002 to 2007.

Laplante was nominated by President George W. Bush on June 13, 2007, to a seat vacated by Joseph A. Diclerico Jr. and subsequently confirmed by the Senate on December 14, 2007 by a vote of 97-0, receiving his commission on December 28, 2007. He served as chief judge from 2011 to 2018.

== Other activities ==
Laplante is a member of the Webster-Batchelder American Inn of Court, and has served on two New Hampshire Bar Association committees: the New Lawyer’s Committee (past chairman), and the Professionalism Committee (past chairman). He is also an advisory board member of the St. Paul’s School Advanced Studies Program, a program that he attended as a student in 1982.

Judge Laplante has served on the Nashua Region Board of the New Hampshire Charitable Foundation (chairman 2006–08), the Nashua Police Athletic League and Youth Safe Haven (chairman 2003–08), and the St. Christopher School Advisory Board. He coordinates the youth wrestling program (K-8th grade) for the Boys & Girls Club of Greater Nashua, and volunteers at the Corpus Christi Food Pantry.

He is a boxing referee, licensed to officiate both professional and amateur bouts.

Legal offices
Preceded by Joseph A. Diclerico Jr.	Judge of the United States District Court for the District of New Hampshire; 2007–present	Incumbent
Preceded by Steven J. McAuliffe	Chief Judge of the United States District Court for the District of New Hampshire; 2011–2018	Succeeded by Landya B. McCafferty
