= Amandeep Singh Gill =

Indian diplomat and technologist

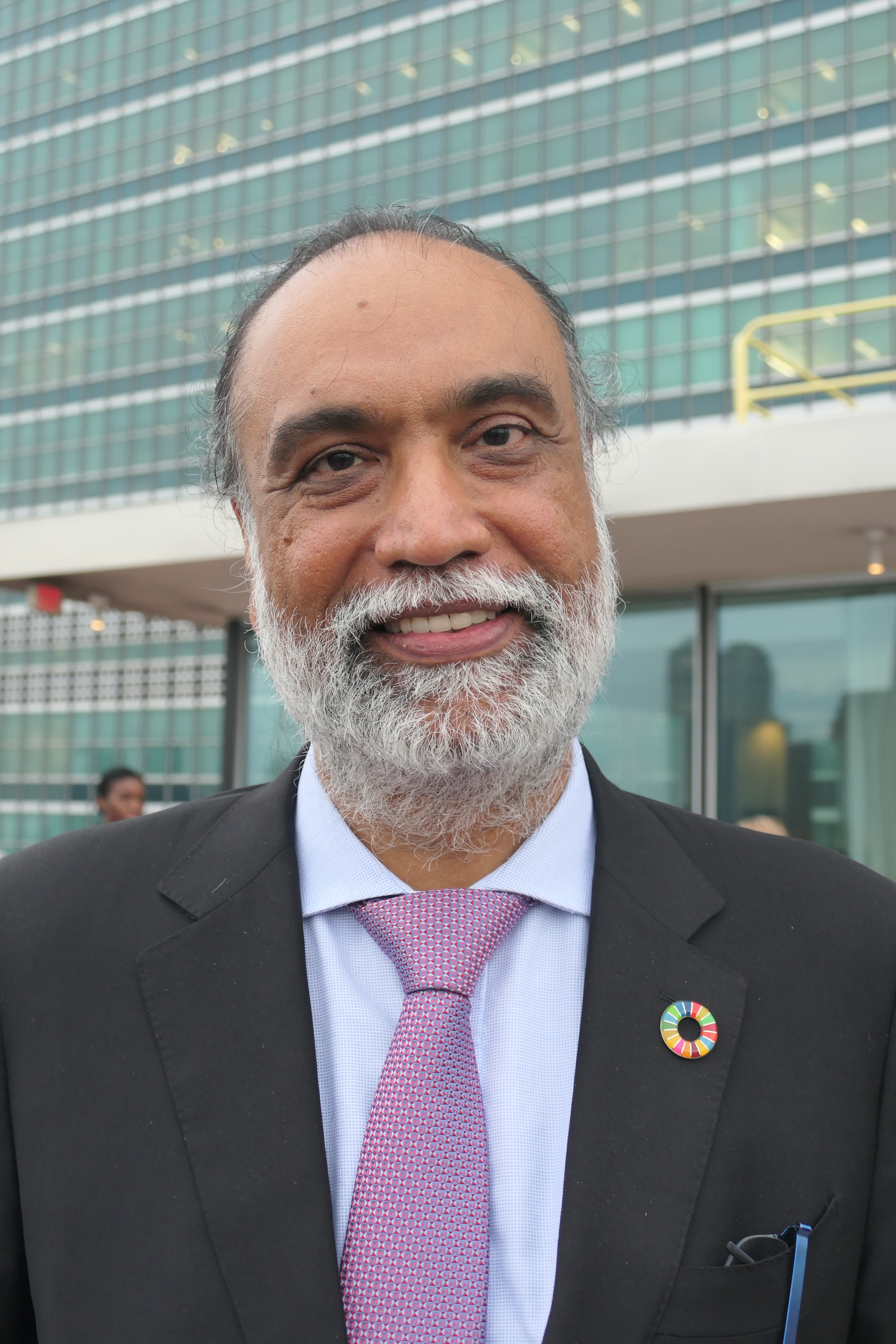
- Amandeep Singh Gill at the United Nations (2025)
- Born: September 29, 1968 (age 58); Chandigarh, India
- Education: Punjab Engineering College (B.Tech); King's College London (PhD)
- Occupations: Technologist and Diplomat
- Spouse: Ashma Singh
- Children: 2

Amandeep Singh Gill (born 29 September 1968) is the United Nations Under-Secretary-General and Special Envoy for Digital and Emerging Technologies since 1 January 2025, having previously served as the Secretary-General's Envoy on Technology (2022–2024). He leads the Office for Digital and Emerging Technologies, supporting implementation of the Global Digital Compact and the work of the Global Dialogue on AI Governance and Independent International Scientific Panel on AI. A veteran diplomat and scholar with a PhD from King's College London, he was India's Ambassador and Permanent Representative to the Conference on Disarmament (2016–2018), and named to TIME's "100 Most Influential People in AI" in 2024.

== Education and career ==
Gill holds a bachelor's degree in Electronics and Electrical Communications from Panjab University, Chandigarh, India. He was a visiting fellow at Stanford University's Center for International Security and Cooperation (CISAC) during 2008–2009. He also holds a PhD from King's College, London. His PhD thesis is on Nuclear Learning in Multilateral Forums.

Gill began his diplomatic career in 1992 and served in various capacities in the Indian Embassy in Tehran, Iran, and the High Commission of India in Colombo, Sri Lanka. He also served at the Indian Mission to the Conference on Disarmament in Geneva, Switzerland and the Indian Mission to the UN in Geneva. His roles in New Delhi, India included positions in the Disarmament and International Security Affairs (DISA) Division and the UN Division. He also headed the DISA Division from 2013 to 2016.

== Work and Publications ==
Gill has written about the impact of artificial intelligence (AI) on modern life and the necessity for establishing appropriate regulatory frameworks to ensure AI plays a positive role in the future. He has talked about the potential impact of AI on the Global South and about India's role in "how AI could play out in the Global South."

Gill is the author of Nuclear Security Summits: A History, published by Palgrave Macmillan in 2020. The book examines the four Nuclear Security Summits held between 2010 and 2016, drawing on Gill’s experience as a participant, interviews with practitioners and primary documents. It also considers the summit process as a model for international learning and multilateral cooperation on nuclear security.

Gill has also written on international digital cooperation and efforts to address global disparities in access to digital technologies. In a letter published by the Financial Times, “Global effort is needed to close the digital divide”, he argued for international action to address the growing inequities due to AI.

== Personal life ==
Gill is married to educator Ashma Singh and they have one daughter and one son.
