= Steven J. McAuliffe =

American judge (born 1948)

Steven James McAuliffe

Senior Judge of the United States District Court for the District of New Hampshire
- Incumbent
- Assumed office April 1, 2013

Chief Judge of the United States District Court for the District of New Hampshire
- In office 2004–2011
- Preceded by: Paul Barbadoro
- Succeeded by: Joseph Normand Laplante

Judge of the United States District Court for the District of New Hampshire
- In office October 10, 1992 – April 1, 2013
- Appointed by: George H. W. Bush
- Preceded by: Norman H. Stahl
- Succeeded by: Landya B. McCafferty

Personal details
- Born: Steven James McAuliffe; March 3, 1948 (age 78) Cambridge, Massachusetts, U.S.
- Spouses: Sharon Christa Corrigan (m. 1970; died 1986) Kathleen E. Thomas (m. 1992)
- Children: 4
- Education: Virginia Military Institute (BA); Georgetown University (JD)

Military service
- Allegiance: United States
- Branch/service: United States Army
- Years of service: 1973–1977 (active); 1978–1979 (reserve)
- Rank: Captain
- Unit: JAG Corps

Steven James McAuliffe (born March 3, 1948) is a senior United States district judge of the United States District Court for the District of New Hampshire. He is the widower of Christa McAuliffe, one of the victims of the 1986 Space Shuttle Challenger disaster.

== Education and career ==
McAuliffe was born in Cambridge, Massachusetts. He attended Marian High School in Framingham, where he met his future wife Christa Corrigan. He graduated from the Virginia Military Institute with a Bachelor of Arts degree in 1970. His wife had his VMI ring with her on the shuttle; his classmates replaced the ring after her death. McAuliffe studied law at Georgetown University Law Center from 1970 to 1973, receiving a Juris Doctor. McAuliffe attended The JAG School at the University of Virginia and entered U.S. Army JAG Corps. He was a captain in the JAG Corps from 1973 to 1977. From 1977 to 1980, he was an assistant attorney general in New Hampshire. He was in private practice in Concord, New Hampshire, from 1980 until his appointment to the federal bench in 1992.

=== Federal judicial service ===
McAuliffe was nominated by President George H. W. Bush on September 9, 1992, to a seat on the United States District Court for the District of New Hampshire vacated by Norman H. Stahl. He was confirmed by the United States Senate on October 8, 1992, and received his commission on October 10, 1992. He served as Chief Judge from 2004 to 2011. He assumed senior status on April 1, 2013. During McAuliffe's judicial service, his law clerks included Eric Miller, who later served as US Attorney for Vermont.

== Personal life ==
McAuliffe continues to serve as a founding director for the Challenger Center for Space Science Education. He has two children, Scott and Caroline, with his first wife, Christa; they were nine and six, respectively, when she died as a result of the Space Shuttle Challenger disaster. In early 1992, he married Kathleen E. Thomas, a reading teacher for the Concord School District, and mother of two children.

== Sources ==
Legal offices
Preceded by Norman H. Stahl	Judge of the United States District Court for the District of New Hampshire; 1992–2013	Succeeded by Landya B. McCafferty
Preceded by Paul Barbadoro	Chief Judge of the United States District Court for the District of New Hampshire; 2004–2011	Succeeded by Joseph Normand Laplante
