= Erika Kullberg =

American attorney and social media influencer

- Born: 1990 or 1991 (age 35–36); Japan
- Education: University of Notre Dame, Georgetown University Law Center
- Occupations: Attorney, social media influencer
- Website: erika.com

Erika Kullberg is an American attorney and social media influencer best known for her financial advice. A former corporate attorney, her tagline is "I read the fine print so you don't have to." She was ranked in the Forbes Top Creators in both 2025 and 2026.

== Biography ==
Kullberg has stated she was born in Japan to a Japanese mother and an American father, and moved around a lot due to her father's military service. She earned a Bachelor of Arts from the University of Notre Dame before graduating from the Georgetown University Law Center with her Juris Doctor.

She has stated she began reading fine print while at Georgetown, and it first paid off for her when, while flying for a job interview, her bag was delayed. She was able to get a new outfit and be reimbursed for it. She graduated law school in more than 225,000 dollars of debt, and became a corporate lawyer. She has claimed that she walked 30 minutes to her job every day to save the 2 dollars of bus fare.

She quit her job as a corporate lawyer after her law firm denied her an extension on a project despite a family emergency. She has emphasized how she used every benefit she could get from the company before her last day, and saved an emergency fund. She has since founded a personal brand company, Erika.com, founded a tech startup, Plug and Law, sold an online course, and become a social media creator. She started creating on TikTok due to a bet. In 2020, she made content on stimulus checks.

Her social media reels often follow the same format: polite scripts to say to customer service representatives to get perks or benefits, often with the line "Shh! They don't know I know this hack." Her catchphrase is "I read the fine print so you don't have to." One of her most viral social media reels involves her discussing how to get compensation if you're bumped from your flight. It was analyzed by The Washington Post.

Satirical parodies of her videos began being created in November 2021, and as of 2022 had more than 30 million views. She has commented in support of the parodies, and has stated that she "loves the recreations too".

She was named a Changemaker by Money in 2023. She was ranked #34 in the Forbes Top Creators in 2025 and #40 in the same list in 2026. As of 2024, she had more than 21 million followers on social media.
