= Aloysius Joseph Connor =

American judge

Judge of the United States District Court for the District of New Hampshire
- In office December 9, 1944 – December 18, 1967
- Appointed by: Franklin D. Roosevelt
- Preceded by: George Franklin Morris
- Succeeded by: Hugh H. Bownes

Personal details
- Born: Aloysius Joseph Connor; April 13, 1895 Manchester, New Hampshire
- Died: December 18, 1967 (aged 72)
- Education: Columbus School of Law (LL.B.)

Aloysius Joseph Connor (April 13, 1895 – December 18, 1967) was a United States district judge of the United States District Court for the District of New Hampshire.

== Education and career ==
Born in Manchester, New Hampshire, Connor received a Bachelor of Laws from the Columbus School of Law at the Catholic University of America in 1918. He was in private practice in Manchester from 1919 to 1937, serving as county treasurer of Hillsborough County, New Hampshire from 1923 to 1924, and as city solicitor for Manchester from 1935 to 1936. He was a Judge of the Superior Court of New Hampshire from 1937 to 1945.

== Federal judicial service ==
On November 16, 1944, Connor was nominated by President Franklin D. Roosevelt to a seat on the United States District Court for the District of New Hampshire vacated by Judge George Franklin Morris. Connor was confirmed by the United States Senate on December 5, 1944, and received his commission on December 9, 1944, serving thereafter until his death on December 18, 1967.

== Sources ==
Legal offices
Preceded by George Franklin Morris	Judge of the United States District Court for the District of New Hampshire; 1944–1967	Succeeded by Hugh H. Bownes
