= United States District Court for the District of New Hampshire =

United States district court

Coordinates: 43°12′7″N 71°32′23″W

- (D.N.H.)
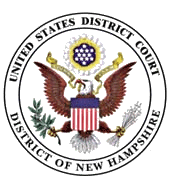

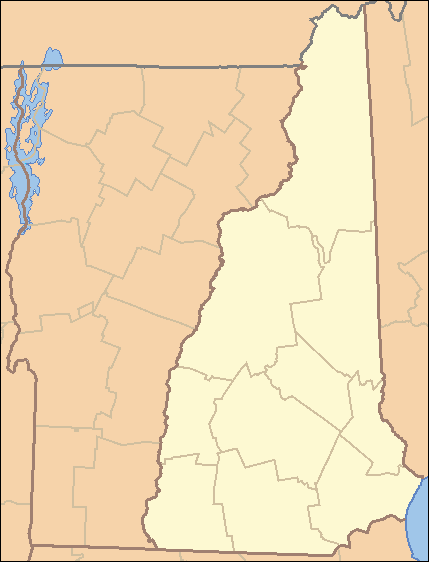
- Location: Concord More locations: Littleton
- Appeals to: First Circuit
- Established: September 24, 1789
- Judges: 3
- Chief Judge: Samantha D. Elliott

Officers of the court
- U.S. Attorney: Erin Creegan
- U.S. Marshal: Nick Willard
- www.nhd.uscourts.gov

The United States District Court for the District of New Hampshire (in case citations, D.N.H.) is the federal district court whose jurisdiction comprises the state of New Hampshire. The Warren B. Rudman U.S. Courthouse for the New Hampshire district is located in Concord.

Appeals from the District of New Hampshire are taken to the United States Court of Appeals for the First Circuit (except for patent claims and claims against the U.S. government under the Tucker Act, which are appealed to the Federal Circuit).

The United States Attorney's Office for the District of New Hampshire represents the United States in civil and criminal litigation in the court. As of August 12, 2025, the United States attorney is Erin Creegan.

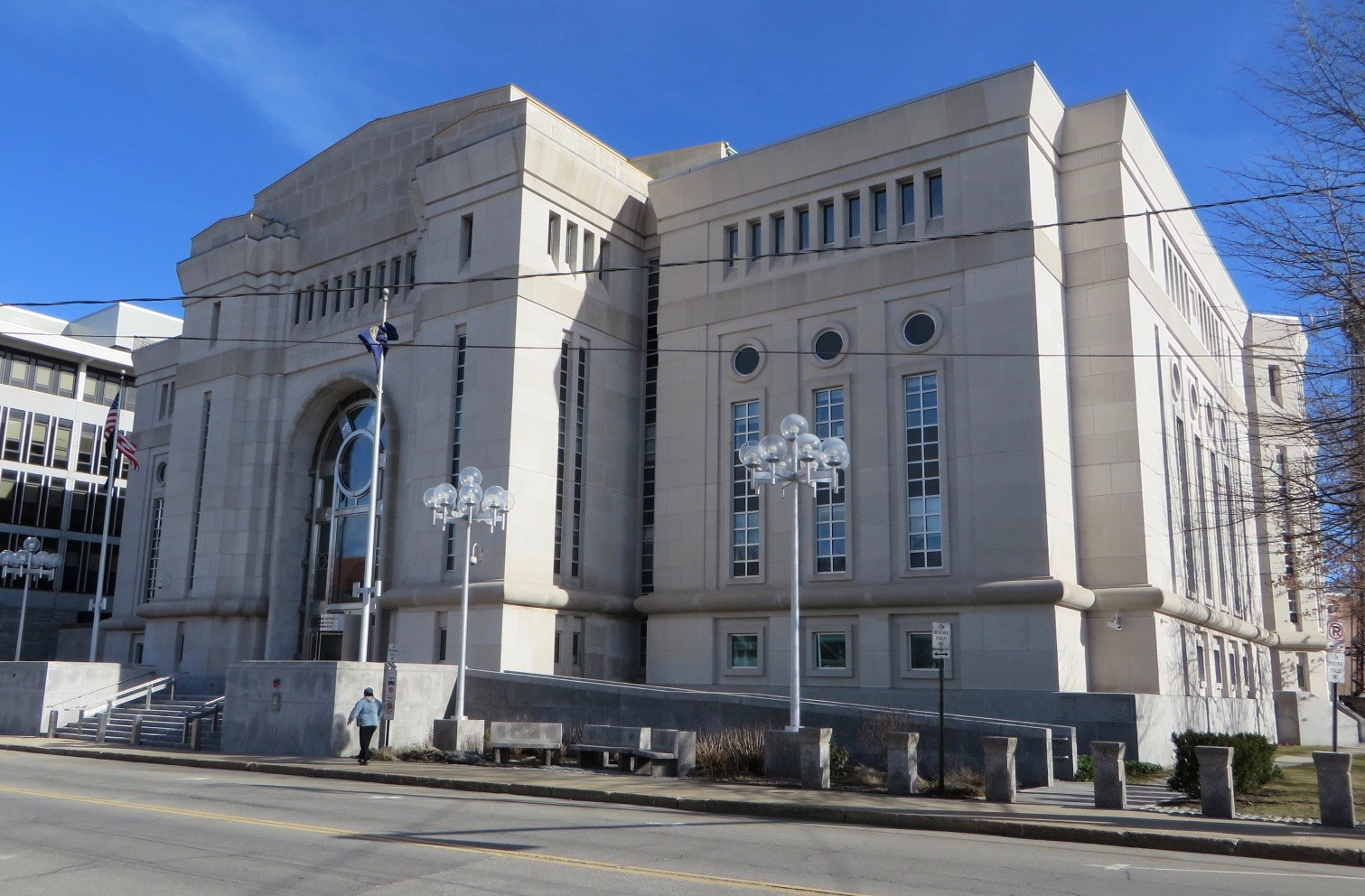
The Warren B. Rudman U.S. Courthouse in Concord

== Current judges ==
As of November 1, 2025:

#	Title	Judge	Duty station	Born	Term of service			Appointed by
#	Title	Judge	Duty station	Born	Active	Chief	Senior	Appointed by
18	Chief Judge	Samantha D. Elliott	Concord	1975	2021–present	2025–present	—	Biden
16	District Judge	Joseph Normand Laplante	Concord	1965	2007–present	2011–2018	—	G.W. Bush
17	District Judge	Landya B. McCafferty	Concord	1962	2013–present	2018–2025	—	Obama
14	Senior Judge	Paul Barbadoro	Concord	1955	1992–2021	1997–2004	2021–present	G.H.W. Bush
15	Senior Judge	Steven J. McAuliffe	Concord	1948	1992–2013	2004–2011	2013–present	G.H.W. Bush

== Former judges ==
#	Judge	Born–died	Active service	Chief Judge	Senior status	Appointed by	Reason for termination
1	John Sullivan	1740–1795	1789–1795	—	—	Washington	death
2	John Pickering	1737–1805	1795–1804	—	—	Washington	removal
3	John Samuel Sherburne	1757–1830	1804–1830	—	—	Jefferson	death
4	Matthew Harvey	1781–1866	1830–1866 (Note: Recess appointment; formally nominated on December 14, 1830, confirmed by the United States Senate on December 16, 1830, and received commission the same day)	—	—	Jackson	death
5	Daniel Clark	1809–1891	1866–1891	—	—	A. Johnson	death
6	Edgar Aldrich	1848–1921	1891–1921	—	—	B. Harrison	death
7	George Franklin Morris	1866–1953	1921–1943	—	1943–1953	Harding	death
8	Aloysius Joseph Connor	1895–1967	1944–1967	—	—	F. Roosevelt	death
9	Hugh H. Bownes	1920–2003	1968–1977	—	—	L. Johnson	elevation
10	Shane Devine	1926–1999	1978–1992	1979–1992	1992–1999	Carter	death
11	Martin F. Loughlin	1923–2007	1979–1989	—	1989–1995	Carter	retirement
12	Norman H. Stahl	1931–2023	1990–1992	—	—	G.H.W. Bush	elevation
13	Joseph A. Diclerico Jr.	1941–2022	1992–2007	1992–1997	2007–2022	G.H.W. Bush	death

== Chief judges ==
Chief Judge
Devine	1979–1992
Diclerico	1992–1997
Barbadoro	1997–2004
McAuliffe	2004–2011
Laplante	2011–2018
McCafferty	2018–2025
Elliott	2025–present

Chief judges have administrative responsibilities with respect to their district court. Unlike the Supreme Court, where one justice is specifically nominated to be chief, the office of chief judge rotates among the district court judges. To be chief, a judge must have been in active service on the court for at least one year, be under the age of 65, and have not previously served as chief judge.

A vacancy is filled by the judge highest in seniority among the group of qualified judges. The chief judge serves for a term of seven years, or until age 70, whichever occurs first. The age restrictions are waived if no members of the court would otherwise be qualified for the position.

When the office was created in 1948, the chief judge was the longest-serving judge who had not elected to retire, on what has since 1958 been known as senior status, or declined to serve as chief judge. After August 6, 1959, judges could not become or remain chief after turning 70 years old. The current rules have been in operation since October 1, 1982.

== Succession of seats ==
Seat 1
Seat established on September 24, 1789 by 1 Stat. 73
Sullivan	1789–1795
Pickering	1795–1804
Sherburne	1804–1830
Harvey	1830–1866
Clark	1866–1891
Aldrich	1891–1921
Morris	1921–1943
Connor	1944–1967
Bownes	1968–1977
Devine	1978–1992
Barbadoro	1992–2021
Elliott	2021–present

Seat 2
Seat established on October 20, 1978 by 92 Stat. 1629
Loughlin	1979–1989
Stahl	1990–1992
McAuliffe	1992–2013
McCafferty	2013–present

Seat 3
Seat established on December 1, 1990 by 104 Stat. 5089
Diclerico	1992–2007
Laplante	2007–present

== U.S. attorneys ==
- John Samuel Sherburne (1789–1793)
- Edward St. Loe Livermore (1794–1797)
- Jeremiah Smith (1797–1800)
- Edward St. Loe Livermore (1801)
- John Samuel Sherburne (1802–1804)
- Jonathan Steele (1804)
- Daniel Humphreys (1804–1827)
- William Plumer Jr. (1827–1828)
- Daniel L. Christie (1828–1829)
- Samuel Cushman (1829–1830)
- Daniel Meserve Durell (1830–1834)
- John P. Hale (1834–1841)
- Joel Eastman (1841–1845)
- Franklin Pierce (1845–1847)
- Josiah Minot (1847–1850)
- William Weir Stickney (1850–1853)
- John H. George (1853–1858)
- Anson S. Marshall (1858–1861)
- Charles W. Rand (1861–1871)
- Henry P. Rolf (1871–1874)
- Joshua G. Hall (1874–1879)
- Ossian Ray (1879–1880)
- Charles H. Burns (1881–1885)
- John Samuel Hatch Frink (1885–1890)
- James W. Remick (1890–1894)
- Oliver Ernesto Branch (1894–1898)
- Charles J. Hamblett (1898–1907)
- Charles W. Hoitt (1907–1914)
- Fred H. Brown (1914–1922)
- Raymond V. Smith (1922–1934)
- Alexander Murchie (1934–1944)
- Dennis E. Sullivan (1945–1949)
- Robert D. Branch (1949)
- John J. Sheehan (1949–1954)
- Maurice P. Bois (1954–1961)
- William H. Craig (1961–1963)
- John D. McCarthy (1963)
- Louis M. Janelle (1963–1969)
- David A. Brock (1969–1972)
- William B. Cullimore (1972–1973)
- Carroll F. Jones (1973)
- William J. Deachman, III (1973–1977)
- William A. Shaheen (1977–1981)
- Robert J. Kennedy (1981)
- W. Stephen Thayer, III (1981–1984)
- Bruce E. Kenna (1984–1985)
- Richard V. Wiebusch (1985–1988)
- Peter E. Papps (1988–1989)
- Jeffrey R. Howard (1989–1992)
- Peter E. Papps (1992–1993)
- Paul M. Gagnon (1993–2001)
- Gretchen Leah Witt (2001)
- Thomas P. Colantuono (2001–2009)
- John P. Kacavas (2009–2015)
- Emily Gray Rice (2015–2017)
- John J. Farley (acting) (2017–2018)
- Scott W. Murray (2018–2021)
- John J. Farley (acting) (2021–2022)
- Jane E. Young (2022-2025)
- Jay McCormack (acting) (2025)
- Erin Creegan (2025-Present)

== See also ==
- Courts of New Hampshire
- List of current United States district judges
- List of United States federal courthouses in New Hampshire
