= Norman H. Stahl =

American judge (1931–2023)

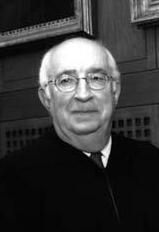
- Stahl in 2003

Senior Judge of the United States Court of Appeals for the First Circuit
- In office April 16, 2001 – April 8, 2023

Judge of the United States Court of Appeals for the First Circuit
- In office June 30, 1992 – April 16, 2001
- Appointed by: George H. W. Bush
- Preceded by: David Souter
- Succeeded by: Jeffrey R. Howard

Judge of the United States District Court for the District of New Hampshire
- In office April 6, 1990 – June 30, 1992
- Appointed by: George H. W. Bush
- Preceded by: Martin F. Loughlin
- Succeeded by: Steven J. McAuliffe

Personal details
- Born: January 30, 1931 Manchester, New Hampshire, U.S.
- Died: April 8, 2023 (aged 92)
- Education: Tufts University (BA); Harvard University (LLB)

Norman Harold Stahl (January 30, 1931 – April 8, 2023) was an American lawyer who served as a United States circuit judge of the United States Court of Appeals for the First Circuit. He was formerly a United States district judge of the United States District Court for the District of New Hampshire.

== Education and career ==
Stahl was born in Manchester, New Hampshire, on January 30, 1931. He received a Bachelor of Arts degree from Tufts College in 1952. He received a Bachelor of Laws from Harvard Law School in 1955. He was a law clerk for Judge John V. Spalding of the Massachusetts Supreme Judicial Court from 1955 to 1956. He was in private practice of law in Manchester from 1956 to 1990.

== Federal judicial service ==
Stahl was nominated by President George H. W. Bush on January 24, 1990, to a seat on the United States District Court for the District of New Hampshire vacated by Judge Martin F. Loughlin. He was confirmed by the United States Senate on April 5, 1990, and received commission on April 6, 1990. His service was terminated on June 30, 1992, due to elevation to the court of appeals.

Stahl was nominated by President George H. W. Bush on April 9, 1992, to a seat on the United States Court of Appeals for the First Circuit vacated by Judge David Souter. He was confirmed by the United States Senate on June 26, 1992, and received commission on June 30, 1992. He assumed senior status on April 16, 2001. His service terminated upon his death.

Stahl also served on committees of the Judicial Conference of the United States dealing with the federal judicial budget and with court facilities and securities issues.

== Personal life and death ==
Stahl died on April 8, 2023, at the age of 92.

== See also ==
- List of Jewish American jurists

== Sources ==
Legal offices
Preceded by Martin F. Loughlin	Judge of the United States District Court for the District of New Hampshire; 1990–1992	Succeeded by Steven J. McAuliffe
Preceded by David Souter	Judge of the United States Court of Appeals for the First Circuit; 1992–2001	Succeeded by Jeffrey R. Howard
