= Biographical Directory of Federal Judges =

American publication

The Biographical Directory of Federal Judges is a publication of the Federal Judicial Center providing basic biographical information on all past and present United States federal court Article III judges (those federal judges with life tenure).

These include justices of the Supreme Court of the United States and judges of United States courts of appeals, district courts, and the now-obsolete circuit courts.

The Biographical Directory is available online in searchable format. Biographical information provided for each judge includes birth and death dates, educational background, a summary of the judge's professional career and a summary of the judge's federal judicial service (including dates of nomination, confirmation, and acceptance of commission.) Where available, links to the location of the judge's manuscript papers, biographical sources, and oral history sources are also provided.

As a non-copyrighted work of the United States government, the Biographical Directory is in the public domain within the United States.
