= 2016 deaths in American television =

The following deaths of notable individuals related to American television occurred in 2016.

== January ==
Date	Name	Age	Notability	Source
January 5	Elizabeth Swados	64	American writer and composer; guest roles on ABC soap operas (Loving, All My Children, One Life to Live, and General Hospital), NBC soap operas (Days of Our Lives, Another World, and Santa Barbara) and CBS soap operas (The Young and the Restless, The Bold and the Beautiful, As the World Turns, and Guiding Light)	
January 6	Pat Harrington, Jr.	86	American actor, best known for his role of building superintendent Dwayne Schneider in One Day at a Time, also voiced the "Inspector" in the animated series The Inspector (other roles include Make Room for Daddy, The Steve Allen Show, The Man from U.N.C.L.E., The Superman/Aquaman Hour of Adventure, The New Scooby-Doo Movies, Love, American Style, Wait Till Your Father Gets Home, Owen Marshall: Counselor at Law, Captain Caveman and the Teen Angels, The Love Boat, Murder, She Wrote and Yo Yogi!)	
January 7	Richard Libertini	82	American actor (Mary Hartman, Mary Hartman, Soap, Barney Miller, Family Man, DuckTales, The Fanelli Boys, Pacific Station, Murder, She Wrote, Jenny and Law & Order)	
January 10	David Bowie	69	Ground-breaking British singer, songwriter, musician, and actor (television credits include appearing on Soul Train, the second non-R&B artist to do so after Elton John; a voice over role in SpongeBob SquarePants and guest starring in Dream On; and promos for the "I Want My MTV" campaign)	
January 10	Michael Galeota	31	American actor, best known for his roles as Bailey Kipper in Bailey Kipper's P.O.V. and Nick Lighter in The Jersey	
January 11	David Margulies	78	American actor (Kojak, Tales from the Darkside, The Equalizer, Spenser: For Hire, Northern Exposure, Touched by an Angel, Law & Order, The Sopranos)	
January 13	Jim Simpson	88	Sportscaster (most notable work with NBC Sports and ESPN as well as WRC-TV/Washington, D.C. and WMAR-TV/Baltimore)	
January 14	Alan Rickman	69	British actor (American television work includes guest spots on Fallen Angels and King of the Hill)	
January 15	Dan Haggerty	74	American actor, best known for his role as James Capen "Grizzly" Adams in The Life and Times of Grizzly Adams film and television series	
January 15	Noreen Corcoran	72	American actress, dancer and singer, best known for her role as Kelly Gregg in Bachelor Father	
January 17	Mike Sharpe	64	Canadian professional wrestler, best known for his time in the World Wrestling Federation as "Iron Mike"	
January 18	Glenn Frey	67	American singer/songwriter (The Eagles) and actor (television credits include Miami Vice and South of Sunset)	
January 18	Gary Menteer	76	American writer, director and producer (Family Matters, Happy Days, Laverne & Shirley and Punky Brewster)	
January 23	J. Stewart Bryan III	77	American media executive (Chairman of Media General)	
January 24	Nick Wiltgen	39	Meteorologist with The Weather Channel's television, radio, and digital broadcasts	
January 24	Ted Brown	36	Producer for ESPN	
January 26	Abe Vigoda	94	Actor, best known as Detective Phil Fish on Barney Miller and its spinoff Fish, and frequent cameos on Late Night with Conan O'Brien	
January 28	Mike Minor	75	Actor/singer, best known as Steve Elliot on Petticoat Junction, Brandon Kingsley on All My Children, Dr. Royal Dunning on Another World and supporting roles on The Donald O'Connor Show, The Beverly Hillbillies, CHiPs, Vega$, L.A. Law, The Edge of Night, and As the World Turns	

== February ==
Date	Name	Age	Notability	Source
February 1	William E. Mayher III	77	Chairman of the Board of Gray Television since 1993	
February 2	Bob Elliott	92	Comedian (half of the Bob and Ray duo), game show host (The Name's the Same), and actor (Get a Life)	
February 3	Joe Alaskey	63	American comedian, actor, voice actor, and author (notable for his role as Beano Froelich on Out of This World; the voice of Bugs Bunny and Daffy Duck and numerous Warner Bros. Animation characters, including his Daytime Emmy Award for Duck Dodgers; an additional voice in Back to the Future; the voice of Grandpa Lou Pickles in both Rugrats and All Grown Up!; host of Couch Potatoes)	
February 3	Jack Eaton	86	Sportscaster/director at WMC-TV/Memphis from 1956 to 1991, the voice of University of Memphis' football and basketball broadcasts from 1959 to 1987, and wrestling announcer/host	
February 4	Dave Mirra	41	Champion BMX cyclist and host of MTV's Real World/Road Rules Challenge (2004–2005)	
February 4	Brian Knighton	44	Wrestler better known by the ring name Axl Rotten, best known for his time in Extreme Championship Wrestling	
February 4	Jim Pederson	68	Actor, best known throughout Wisconsin and the Midwest as the fictional face and personality of Rocky Rococo Pizza in its television commercials.	
February 5	Ray Colcord	66	American composer (Double Trouble, The Charmings, Trial and Error, The Facts of Life, My Two Dads, Singer & Sons, Scorch, The Torkelsons, Where I Live, Dinosaurs, Maybe This Time, Hiller and Diller, You Wish, Promised Land, Boy Meets World, Family Affair, Lost at Home and Girl Meets World)	
February 6	Sam Spence	88	American composer (in-house composer for NFL Films and NFL Network telecasts, work also heard on KaBlam!, Everybody Loves Raymond and SpongeBob SquarePants)	
February 7	Dave Anderson	55	Comedian and television personality at KATU-TV/Portland, Oregon	
February 8	Norman Hudis	93	British writer (Green Acres, Garrison's Gorillas, The Man from U.N.C.L.E., Hawaii Five-O, It Takes a Thief, Marcus Welby, M.D., Switch, Paw Paws); special guest appearance in I Dream of Jeannie, Bewitched, and Murder, She Wrote	
February 11	Kevin Randleman	44	Wrestler and mixed martial artist (UFC, Strikeforce)	
February 15	Denise "Vanity" Matthews	57	Canadian-American actress/singer and evangelist (credits include Miami Vice, Friday the 13th: The Series, and Highlander: The Series)	
February 15	George Gaynes	98	Actor (several television series, most notably Punky Brewster and Hearts Afire)	
February 16	Lex McAllister	31	Reality television participant who appeared in season 14 of The Bachelor	
February 18	Paul Gordon	52	American musician and composer, was a member of The B-52's; composed the music for Power Rangers Turbo, Power Rangers in Space, Digimon Adventure, Digimon Adventure 02, Action Man, Transformers: Robots in Disguise and Power Rangers Wild Force	
February 18	Angela Raiola	55	American reality television personality (Mob Wives)	
February 19	Charlie Tuna	71	Los Angeles-based radio personality, television host (Cinema, Cinema, Cinema) and announcer (Time Machine, Scrabble, Scattergories, The $25,000 Pyramid, The Quiz Kids Challenge, The New Battlestars, Mike Douglas Show, and Thicke of the Night).	
February 24	Fred Lozano	67	Television news anchorman, reporter, and journalist, who was a fixture on San Antonio television stations KENS and WOAI-TV from 1977 to 2012	
February 24	Eddie Einhorn	80	Founder of TVS Television Network, executive with CBS Sports, and sports promoter; credited with introducing men's college basketball on television to a nationwide audience	
February 25	Sam Merrill	55	News anchor for WNEM-TV/Saginaw/Flint, MI since 1990	
February 25	Tony Burton	78	American actor (television works included starring in Frank's Place and an appearance in Gibbsville)	
February 27	Bruce Golin	58	Emmy Award-winning Post-production producer (notable work includes Knight Rider, Sliders, CSI, CSI: Miami, CSI: NY, The Last Man on Earth, Transparent, Hindsight, and Daredevil)	
February 28	George Kennedy	91	American actor, (The Phil Silvers Show, The Asphalt Jungle, Have Gun - Will Travel, Gunsmoke, Dr. Kildare, The Virginian, Sarge, The Blue Knight, Backstairs at the White House, The Love Boat, Dallas and The Young and the Restless)	

== March ==
Date	Name	Age	Notability	Source
March 1	Lee Reherman	49	Actor, best known as Hawk on American Gladiators; recurring guest role on General Hospital and Guiding Light	
March 3	Ralph Baruch	92	Executive with CBS and the first president & chief executive of Viacom	
March 4	Bud Collins	86	Boston-based sportswriter and tennis analyst for CBS, NBC, and ESPN	
March 4	Joey Feek	40	Reality television participant who appeared in season 1 of Can You Duet	
March 6	Nancy Reagan	94	Former First Lady of the United States to husband Ronald Reagan, actress, author, member of the board of directors of the Screen Actors Guild, and activist against drug and substance abuse with the "Just Say No" campaign (notable work includes Diff'rent Strokes, Dynasty, Zane Grey Theatre, Wagon Train, and The Tall Man)	
March 12	James Sheldon	95	Director (several series, notably Mr. Peepers, The Twilight Zone, Batman, and Sanford & Son)	
March 15	Sylvia Anderson	88	British television and film producer, writer and voice actress (Thunderbirds, Space: 1999)	
March 16	Frank Sinatra, Jr.	72	American singer/songwriter/composer and actor (Family Guy, The Sopranos and Son of the Beach)	
March 17	Larry Drake	66	Actor, best known for winning two Emmy Awards for playing Benny Stulwicz on L.A. Law	
March 18	Joe Santos	84	Actor, best known as Dennis Becker on The Rockford Files. Also roles on The Sopranos, Santa Barbara, Magnum, P.I., Hardcastle and McCormick, a.k.a. Pablo, and Me and Maxx	
March 18	John Schnabel	96	Goldminer who appeared on the reality show Gold Rush	
March 21	Peter Brown	80	American actor (Maverick, Lawman, Cheyenne, Wagon Train, Laredo, The Virginian, One Life to Live, Days of Our Lives, The Young and the Restless and The Bold and the Beautiful)	
March 22	David Smyrl	80	American actor, best known as Mr. Handford (owner of Hooper's Store) on Sesame Street from 1990 to 1998, also appeared on numerous episodes of The Cosby Show	
March 22	Richard Bradford	81	American actor, best known as McGill, the main character in Man in a Suitcase, from 1967 to 1968. He also appeared in a number of TV episodes, including Gunsmoke, The High Chaparral, Mannix, Murder, She Wrote, The Waltons, and a recurring role in Cagney & Lacey, in addition to several feature films.	
March 23	Joe Garagiola	90	Former baseball player and announcer for the Arizona Diamondbacks and NBC Sports. Also game show host (He Said, She Said, Memory Game, Sale of the Century, To Tell the Truth, Strike It Rich), guest host of The Tonight Show Starring Johnny Carson, panelist on The Today Show and Match Game, and co-host of the Westminster Kennel Club Dog Show	
March 23	Ken Howard	71	American actor (Adam's Rib, The Manhunter, The White Shadow, It's Not Easy, Dynasty, The Colbys, Murder, She Wrote, Melrose Place, Crossing Jordan, Cane, The Young and the Restless and 30 Rock)	
March 24	Earl Hamner, Jr.	92	American writer and producer, best known as the creator of The Waltons, Apple's Way and Falcon Crest (other credits include The Twilight Zone, Gentle Ben, Nanny and the Professor and Morningstar/Eveningstar)	
March 24	Garry Shandling	66	Actor and comedian best known as the star of The Larry Sanders Show and It's Garry Shandling's Show, also a regular guest host on The Tonight Show Starring Johnny Carson	
March 26	Dick Fabian	81	News anchor at WNEM-TV/Saginaw/Flint and radio DJ at WKNX	
March 27	Eric Engberg	74	Reporter for WTOP-TV, Group W, and CBS News	
March 27	Mother Angelica	92	Catholic nun, founder of Eternal Word Television Network and WEWN, and host of EWTN's Mother Angelica Live	
March 27	Howard Berk	91	American novelist, producer, and television writer (Columbo, Mission: Impossible, The Rockford Files)	
March 28	James Noble	94	Actor, best known for the role of Governor Eugene Gatling on Benson	
March 29	Patty Duke	69	Actress best known as the star of The Patty Duke Show	

== April ==
Date	Name	Age	Notability	Source
April 3	Bill Henderson	90	American jazz singer and actor (The Bill Cosby Show, Harry O, Ace Crawford, Private Eye, Dreams)	
April 5	Barbara Turner	79	American actress, writer and producer, mother of actress Jennifer Jason Leigh	
April 7	Robert Windham	73	Professional wrestler and WWE Hall of Famer better known by the ring name Blackjack Mulligan	
April 7	Philip Scheffler	85	American producer, was the senior producing for 60 Minutes from 1980 to 2003.	
April 8	Daisy Lewellyn	36	American style expert who appeared on the reality show Blood, Sweat and Heels. Also editor for fashion magazines Essence, InStyle, and Glamour	
April 9	Arthur Anderson	93	American actor, best known for voicing Lucky the Leprechuan in Lucky Charms commercials from 1963 to 1992, was also the second voice of Eustace Bagge in Courage the Cowardly Dog	
April 9	Stacy Fawcett	45	Radio and television personality in the Dallas-Ft. Worth media market, notably as a food critic blogger and host of a cooking segment for WFAA-TV's newscasts.	
April 11	Doug Banks	57	American radio and television personality (alumni of WLS-TV/Chicago as a contributor on the station's 190 North, fill in host on NASCAR Now, guest starred on My Wife and Kids)	
April 12	Anne Jackson	90	American actress	
April 12	Jon Rechner	44	American professional wrestler better known by the ring name Balls Mahoney, most notably with Extreme Championship Wrestling	
April 17	Doris Roberts	90	Actress, best known as Marie Barone on Everybody Loves Raymond, a role that won her four Emmy Awards. Also won an Emmy for playing Cora on the St. Elsewhere season 1 episode "Cora and Arnie"	
April 19	Denise Stewart-Bohn	47	Radio personality (WCXT/Benton Harbor, Michigan) and television reporter (WSBT-TV/South Bend)	
April 19	Scott Nimerfro	54	American television/film screenwriter and producer (Once Upon a Time, Pushing Daisies)	
April 20	Joanie Laurer	45	WWE wrestler and pornographic actress better known as Chyna. Also appeared on 3rd Rock from the Sun, The Surreal Life, and Celebrity Rehab with Dr. Drew	
April 21	Prince	57	American musician, songwriter, producer, and actor (notable credits include Muppets Tonight, New Girl and Saturday Night Live)	
April 23	Madeleine Sherwood	93	Canadian actress, singer, writer, producer, and Civil Rights activist (notable for playing Mother Superior Placidos in The Flying Nun and daytime roles in Guiding Light, One Life to Live and As the World Turns)	
April 27	Philip Kives	87	Canadian businessman, founder of K-Tel and a pioneer of the Infomercial concept who coined the term "As seen on TV"	
April 30	Peter Thomas	91	Voice over narrator/announcer, best known for Forensic Files, Nova and numerous commercials	

== May ==
Date	Name	Age	Notability	Source
May 6	Rickey E. Smith Jr.	36	American reality television participant and singer who competed in season 2 of American Idol	
May 8	Mike Fleming	74	Conservative television/radio journalist and host in the Memphis media market	
May 8	William Schallert	93	American character actor, best known for playing patriarch Martin Lane on The Patty Duke Show	
May 8	Reg Grundy	92	Australian television producer, creator, and syndicator, known for creating American game shows (Scrabble), adapting American programs to international viewers (Sale of the Century), and bringing Australian shows to the United States via his syndication company (Prisoner:Cell Block H and Neighbours)	
May 12	Julius La Rosa	86	Italian-American singer, actor, and television/radio personality (notable for being a regular on Arthur Godfrey and His Friends, the host of The Julius La Rosa Show, a recurring role on Another World, and a frequent contributor to the Labor Day telethon)	
May 19	Morley Safer	84	Canadian-American television and radio journalist, reporter, and author, who was a mainstay at CBS News for 61 years, including 46 as co-host of 60 Minutes	
May 19	Rosemary Gernette	81	Television personality and talk show host at WISN-TV/Milwaukee, and an alumnus of WSAU/Wausau, Wisconsin	
May 19	Alan Young	96	Actor, best known as Wilbur Post on Mister Ed and the voice of Scrooge McDuck on DuckTales and host of The Alan Young Show	
May 23	Joe Fleishaker	62	Actor best known for his work with Troma Entertainment. Also appeared in numerous skits on Late Show with David Letterman	
May 24	Buck Kartalian	93	American actor (My Favorite Martian, Friends, and Curb Your Enthusiasm)	
May 27	Michael Dann	94	Television executive (VP/Programming for CBS, 1963–1970)	
May 31	Jan Crouch	78	Co-founder of the Trinity Broadcasting Network and founder of Smile of a Child TV; co-host of TBN's flagship programs Praise the Lord and Behind the Scenes	

== June ==
Date	Name	Age	Notability	Source
June 3	Muhammad Ali	74	American boxer, Olympic Gold medalist, author, actor, sports commentator, and activist (notable credits include Freedom Road, the titular character in the 1977 NBC animated series, I Am the Greatest: The Adventures of Muhammad Ali, Diff'rent Strokes, and numerous sports programs, as well as commercial work for Coca-Cola and D-Con)	
June 6	Theresa Saldana	61	Actress, best known as Rachel Scali on The Commish	
June 10	Christina Grimmie	22	Reality television participant who appeared in season 6 of The Voice	
June 12	Janet Waldo	96	Voice actress, best known as Judy Jetson on The Jetsons	
June 12	Michu Meszaros	76	Hungarian-born American circus performer, stuntman, and actor, best known for performing in costume as ALF in several first-season episodes of the television series of the same name	
June 14	Ronnie Claire Edwards	83	American film and television character actress, best known as Corabeth Walton Godsey on The Waltons	
June 14	Ann Morgan Guilbert	87	American character actress, best known as Millie Helper on The Dick Van Dyke Show and Grandma Yetta on The Nanny	
June 17	Ron Lester	45	Actor, best known as Michael 'Sugar Daddy' Bernardino on Popular	
June 17	Mary Ann King	82	Television actress and educator, known to Los Angeles viewers as "Miss Mary Ann" on Romper Room during its run on KCOP-TV	
June 18	Alejandro Fuentes	45	American singer who competed in La Voz... México	
June 19	Anton Yelchin	27	Russian actor (Trollhunters, Huff, Law & Order: Criminal Intent)	

== July ==
Date	Name	Age	Notability	Source
July 3	Noel Neill	95	American actress best known for her role of Lois Lane in Adventures of Superman from 1953 to 1958	
July 6	John McMartin	86	American actor (As the World Turns, East Side/West Side, Premiere, Hawaii Five-O, Phyllis, Falcon Crest, Magnum, P.I., The Golden Girls, Lincoln, Beauty and the Beast, Murder, She Wrote, Coach, Touched by an Angel, Oz, Further Tales of the City and Law & Order)	
July 19	Garry Marshall	81	American television producer, writer and director (creator/executive producer of Happy Days, Mork & Mindy, Laverne & Shirley, Blansky's Beauties, Who's Watching the Kids?, Joanie Loves Chachi, Hey, Landlord, and Angie; writer on Tonight Starring Jack Paar, The Danny Thomas Show, The Joey Bishop Show, The Dick Van Dyke Show and The Lucy Show; executive producer of The Odd Couple and The New Odd Couple).	
July 26	Youree Dell Harris	53	Actress best known as "Miss Cleo", the spokeswoman for the Psychic Readers Network from 1997 to 2003.	
July 27	Jerry Doyle	60	Actor (most notably Michael Garibaldi on Babylon 5) and radio personality	
July 30	Dave Schwartz	63	On-camera meteorologist for The Weather Channel	
July 30	Gloria DeHaven	91	American film/television actress, singer, and personality (credits includes regular roles on Ryan's Hope, As the World Turns, Mary Hartman, Mary Hartman, and Nakia; guest starring and supporting roles in Robert Montgomery Presents, Appointment with Adventure, The Guy Mitchell Show, Johnny Ringo, The Rifleman, Wagon Train, The Lloyd Bridges Show, Marcus Welby, M.D., Gunsmoke, Mannix, The Eddie Capra Mysteries, Fantasy Island, Hart to Hart, The Love Boat, Mama's Family, Highway to Heaven, Murder, She Wrote, and Touched by an Angel; Host of Prize Movie at WABC-TV/New York City, and original co-host of WBAY-TV/Green Bay's annual United Cerebral Palsy telethon)	

== August ==
Date	Name	Age	Notability	Source
August 3	Blake Krikorian	48	Entrepreneur and co-founder of the Slingbox television streaming media service	
August 7	Sagan Lewis	63	Actress, best known as Dr. Jacqueline Wade on St. Elsewhere	
August 9	W. Carter Merbreier	90	Children's television host of WPVI-TV's Captain Noah and His Magical Ark	
August 9	Barry Jenner	75	Actor, best known as Admiral William Ross on Star Trek: Deep Space Nine, and recurring roles on Dallas, Family Matters, Knots Landing, and several others	
August 10	John Saunders	61	Longtime sportscaster and host for ESPN's The Sports Reporters	
August 13	Kenny Baker	81	English actor, best known as the voice and operator of R2-D2 in the Star Wars franchise. Also appeared in The Adventure Game, Ben Elton: The Man from Auntie, The Hunchback of Notre Dame, Man of the World, and Prince Caspian and the Voyage of the Dawn Treader	
August 14	Fyvush Finkel	93	Actor, best known as Douglas Wambaugh on Picket Fences (which won him an Emmy Award) and Harvey Lipschultz on Boston Public	
August 15	Dick Assman	82	Canadian gas station attendant famous for his one-month run as a correspondent on the Late Show with David Letterman in 1995	
August 16	John McLaughlin	89	Host of the long running political talk show The McLaughlin Group as well as John McLaughlin's One on One, McLaughlin, and McLaughlin Special Report	
August 19	Lou Pearlman	62	American businessman, record executive, and manager (co-creator/producer of Making the Band, which launched the career of O-Town)	
August 19	Jack Riley	80	American actor and comedian, probably best known as Elliot Carlin in The Bob Newhart Show and the voice of Stu Pickles in Rugrats and its spin-off All Grown Up!. Other roles include Occasional Wife, Gomer Pyle, U.S.M.C., Hogan's Heroes, The Red Skelton Show, Romance Theatre, Diff'rent Strokes, Roxie, Night Court, Son of the Beach and the voice of Country Crock spread commercials.	
August 23	Steven Hill	94	Actor, best known as District Attorney Adam Schiff on Law & Order and Dan Briggs on Mission: Impossible	
August 25	Marvin Kaplan	89	American character actor and comedian, best known as the voice of Choo Choo in Top Cat and Henry Bessaymer on Alice	
August 27	Joy Browne	71	Psychologist who hosted two short-lived television shows, one for syndication (1999–2000) and another for Discovery Health	
August 28	Harry Fujiwara	82	Hawaiian born Japanese-American wrestler and manager, known to WWE fans as Mr. Fuji and an inductee of the 2007 WWE Hall of Fame	
August 29	Gene Wilder	83	American film/television actor, singer, director, writer, author, and producer (television credits include the lead role in Something Wilder and an Emmy Award for guest-starring in Will & Grace)	

== September ==
Date	Name	Age	Notability	Source
September 1	Jon Polito	65	Character and voice actor with over 200 credits in film, television (Homicide: Life on the Street, Crime Story) and video games	
September 5	Hugh O'Brian	91	Film and television actor. Starred in the 1955–61 western series The Life and Legend of Wyatt Earp and the 1972–73 action series Search.	
September 8	Brenda Knox	59	Transgender entertainer and author who performed as The Lady Chablis (appeared in Bizarre Foods America and Real Housewives of Atlanta), guest starring on All My Children, One Life to Live, and Santa Barbara	
September 8	Eric Von Broadley	58	Television and radio journalist, personality, and publisher in the Milwaukee media market (alumnus of WISN-TV/Milwaukee)	
September 10	Eddie Antar	68	Founder of the New York City-based Crazy Eddie electronics chain (famous for the commercial catchphrase "Crazy Eddie's Prices Are So Low They're Insane!")	
September 11	Alexis Arquette	47	American transgender entertainer, LGBT activist, and reality television personality (The Surreal Life)	
September 16	Tom Torbjornsen	60	American auto repairman, hosted and created America's Car Show for WBBZ-TV and was a contributor for WIVB-TV	
September 17	C. Martin Croker	54	American animator and voice actor (roles including Zorak and Moltar on Space Ghost Coast to Coast and Dr. Weird on Aqua Teen Hunger Force)	
September 21	Richard D. Trentlage	87	Advertising composer who wrote several commercial jingles, most notably "The Oscar Mayer Wiener Song".	
September 24	Bill Nunn	63	Actor (television roles include Cash Clay on Sirens and Terrance Phillips on The Job)	
September 25	Arnold Palmer	87	Professional golfer and co-founder of Golf Channel	
September 25	Kashif	59	American musician/songwriter/composer, who also produced music for television commercials and specials	
September 28	Gary Glasberg	50	Producer/writer (several shows, most notably NCIS and NCIS: New Orleans)	
September 28	Agnes Nixon	93	Writer and producer (head writer of Guiding Light, As the World Turns, and Search for Tomorrow; creator of ABC dramas Loving/The City, All My Children and One Life to Live)	

== October ==
Date	Name	Age	Notability	Source
October 1	Ed Hinshaw	76	Anchorman, reporter, commentator, and news director at WTMJ-TV Milwaukee, and later named VP/Human Resources for parent company Journal Communications; alumnus of WRC-TV/Washington, D.C., KSTP-TV/Minneapolis-St. Paul, and KCJB/Minot, North Dakota	
October 11	Patricia Barry	93	Actress (most notably on the soap operas Days of Our Lives, Guiding Light and All My Children; guest starring on Another World, The Young and the Restless, The Bold and the Beautiful, As the World Turns, and General Hospital)	
October 12	Thomas Mikal Ford	52	Actor, best known as Tommy Strawn on Martin	
October 18	Anthony Addabbo	56	Actor and model, best known as Jim Lemay on Guiding Light	
October 21	Jean Gagné	69	Professional wrestler and manager, best known as Frenchy Martin in the World Wrestling Federation	
October 21	Kevin Meaney	60	Comedian (appearances on The Oprah Winfrey Show, The Tonight Show and Late Show) and actor (the 1990 version of Uncle Buck)	
October 25	Kevin Curran	59	Writer/producer (most noted for work on The Simpsons, Late Night with David Letterman, and Married... with Children)	
October 27	John Zacherle	98	Television host and voice actor, best known for Shock Theater on WCAU from 1957 to 1958 and Zacherley at Large on WABC-TV from 1959 to 1960	
October 28	Ron Grant	72	Composer (Knots Landing and Tiny Toon Adventures)	
October 29	Norman Brokaw	89	Talent agent, and later chairman, president and CEO of the William Morris Agency who helped create the series My Little Margie, The Public Defender, Racket Squad and Mr. and Mrs. North, and represented the producers of Gomer Pyle, U.S.M.C., The Dick Van Dyke Show, and The Andy Griffith Show, as well as numerous actors including Marilyn Monroe, Bill Cosby, Elvis Presley, Warren Beatty, and Clint Eastwood.	
October 30	Tammy Grimes	82	Actress and singer (star of The Tammy Grimes Show, guest spot on The Play of the Week episode Archy and Mehitabel)	
October 30	Don Marshall	80	American actor, director, producer and screenwriter, notable for playing Dan Erickson on Land of The Giants	

== November ==
Date	Name	Age	Notability	Source
November 2	Max Alexander	63	American stand-up comedian, actor and writer. (Full House, Out of This World, Matlock, Doogie Howser, M.D., Pearl, The Practice, Hang Time, Beyond Belief: Fact or Fiction, My Wife and Kids and Paul Cruz: Latin Actor (A Mockuseries)	
November 7	Janet Reno	78	Lawyer who served as the first female U.S. Attorney General (television work includes cameos on Saturday Night Live and The Simpsons and a Super Bowl XLI commercial)	
November 11	Robert Vaughn	83	American actor, best known for playing Napoleon Solo on The Man from U.N.C.L.E.	
November 11	Claire Labine	82	American writer and producer, co-created Ryan's Hope, served as script writer and later co-head writer for Where the Heart Is and co-writer for Love of Life; Also served as head writer for General Hospital (1993–1996), One Life to Live (1996–1998) and Guiding Light (2000–2001)	
November 14	Gwen Ifill	61	Journalist and anchor of PBS' NewsHour and Washington Week	
November 24	Colonel Abrams	67	American Dance musician (appeared on Soul Train, Video Soul and Showtime at the Apollo)	
November 24	Florence Henderson	82	American television/film/stage actress/singer, voice actress, talk show host, pitch woman, cook, reality television participant, and author, best known for her iconic role as Carol Brady on The Brady Bunch and its related franchise spin-offs; also an alumnus of Today as both a "Today Girl" and co-host (including Later Today), commercial work for Wesson Oil, part of The Surreal Life, competed on season 11 of Dancing with the Stars, and hosted programs on TNN and Retirement Living TV.	
November 25	Ron Glass	71	American television, film, and voice actor, best known for playing Detective Harris on Barney Miller, Felix Unger in The New Odd Couple, and Derrial Book in Firefly	
November 26	Fritz Weaver	90	American television, film, and stage actor, best known for his Emmy-nominated role in Holocaust	
November 28	Grant Tinker	90	Television producer and executive (co-founder, with former wife Mary Tyler Moore, of MTM Enterprises; Chairman/CEO of NBC from 1981 to 1986)	
November 28	Van Williams	82	American actor (Bourbon Street Beat, Surfside 6, The Green Hornet)	
November 29	Robert Bennett	89	Television executive (founding GM of WCVB-TV/Boston; president of Metromedia)	
November 29	Keo Woolford	49	American actor, producer and screenwriter (portrayed Det. James Chang on Hawaii Five-0)	

== December ==
Date	Name	Age	Notability	Source
December 2	Billy Chapin	74	Actor (guest spots on several shows, most notably Dragnet, Lux Video Theater, and Waterfront)	
December 4	Margaret Whitton	67	Actress (One Life to Live, The Doctors, Hometown, A Fine Romance, Good & Evil)	
December 6	Peter Vaughan	93	British actor, best known for playing Maester Aemon on Game of Thrones	
December 8	John Glenn	95	American astronaut, aviator, politician, and businessman (Appeared as a game show contestant and winner on Name That Tune and as himself on Frasier)	
December 8	Joseph Mascolo	87	Italian-American actor and musician, best known for playing Stefano DiMera on Days of Our Lives from 1982 to 2000 and 2007 to 2016, and Massimo Marone on The Bold and the Beautiful from 2001 to 2006. Other roles include Domino (Nicholas Van Buren) on General Hospital, Carlos Alvarez on Santa Barbara, supporting roles in Where the Heart Is and From These Roots, and guest starring roles on All in the Family, The Eddie Capra Mysteries, Lou Grant and The Rockford Files.	
December 12	Tom Moffatt	85	Television/radio personality and concert promoter who was as a fixture in the Honolulu media market as host of music shows at KHVH and KHON, and served as concert coordinator/producer for Elvis: Aloha from Hawaii	
December 13	Alan Thicke	69	Actor, best known as Dr. Jason Seaver on Growing Pains. Also reality show star (Unusually Thicke), theme song composer and singer (The Facts of Life, Diff'rent Strokes, and several game shows), and talk show host (The Alan Thicke Show and Thicke of the Night). Father of singer Robin Thicke.	
December 14	Bernard Fox	89	Welsh character actor/magician, famous for portraying Dr. Hubert Bombay in Bewitched, Tabitha, and Passions, and Colonel Crittendon on Hogan's Heroes. Other credits include Pee-Wee's Playhouse, The Man from U.N.C.L.E, Knight Rider, Murder, She Wrote, F Troop, Columbo, and M*A*S*H	
December 15	Craig Sager	65	Sportscaster and reporter for Turner Sports, best known as the sideline reporter on NBA on TNT	
December 17	Guillermo Benites	75	Argentine-born American news anchor for Univision	
December 18	Zsa Zsa Gabor	99	Hungarian-born American actress, singer, personality, and socialite (television credits include guest spots on Gilligan's Island, The Fresh Prince of Bel Air, Hart to Hart, Jukebox Jury, Batman, Rowan and Martin's Laugh-In, and Playhouse 90)	
December 18	Gordie Tapp	94	Canadian entertainer, notable for being a cast member of Hee Haw from 1969 to 1988	
December 19	Dick Latessa	87	American actor	
December 20	Lisa Tedesco	59	Radio and television personality in the Boston and Memphis media market (known on-air as Lisa Lipps), who also wrote the 1982 single "General Hosp-Tale," a parody on General Hospital for the Afternoon Delights	
December 21	Valerie Fairman	23	Reality television personality who was featured in 16 and Pregnant	
December 25	George Michael	53	Grammy Award-winning musician/songwriter, and former member of Wham! (appeared as a recurring regular in Eli Stone; guest credits include American Bandstand, American Idol and Solid Gold)	
December 26	Ricky Harris	54	American actor and comedian (Everybody Hates Chris)	
December 26	George S. Irving	94	American stage/film/television actor, notable for being the voice of the narrator on Underdog and the Heat Miser in The Year Without Santa Claus	
December 27	Carrie Fisher	60	American actress, best known for her iconic role as Princess Leia in the Star Wars franchise. (television credits include a regular role in Castastrophe, guest hosting Saturday Night Live, guest starring on Laverne & Shirley and 30 Rock, and voice work on Family Guy)	
December 28	Debbie Reynolds	84	American actress, singer, businesswoman, humanitarian, and author, as well as the mother of Carrie Fisher (notable television credits include starring in her own self-titled television series and Aloha Paradise, the Halloweentown film series, Will & Grace, Madame's Place, and The Love Boat)	
December 28	Barbara Tarbuck	74	American actress (Dallas, Quincy M.E., Cagney & Lacey, Falcon Crest, Santa Barbara, NYPD Blue, General Hospital and American Horror Story)	
December 31	William Christopher	84	American actor, notable for playing Father Mulcahy on M*A*S*H and AfterMASH	
December 31	Daniel Kay, Jr.	40	Reality television participant who appeared in season 17 of Survivor	

== See also ==
- 2016 in American television
- Deaths in 2016
