= John Pastore =

American lawyer and politician (1907–2000)

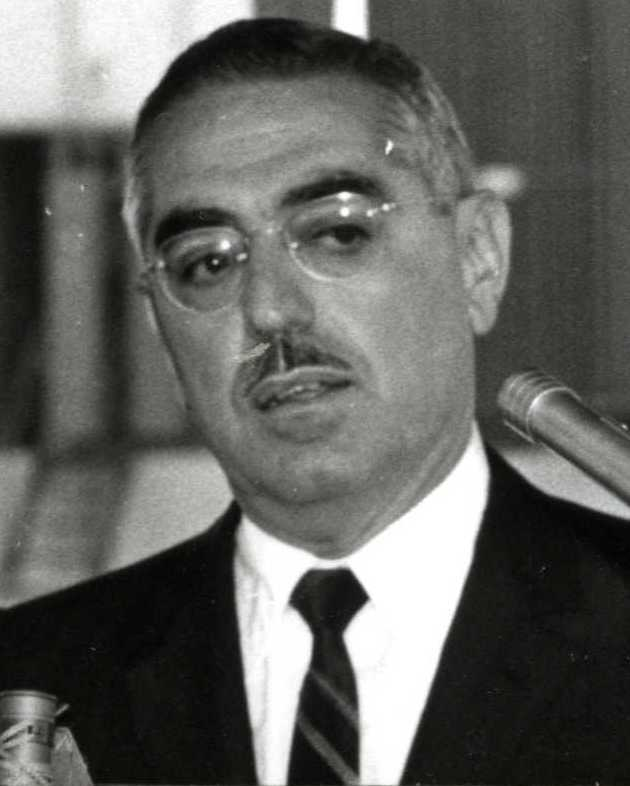
- Pastore in 1961

United States Senator from Rhode Island
- In office December 19, 1950 – December 28, 1976
- Preceded by: Edward L. Leahy
- Succeeded by: John Chafee

61st Governor of Rhode Island
- In office October 6, 1945 – December 19, 1950
- Lieutenant: Vacant (1945–1947); John S. McKiernan (1947–1950)
- Preceded by: J. Howard McGrath
- Succeeded by: John S. McKiernan

54th Lieutenant Governor of Rhode Island
- In office January 1945 – October 6, 1945
- Governor: J. Howard McGrath
- Preceded by: Louis W. Cappelli
- Succeeded by: John S. McKiernan

Member of the Rhode Island House of Representatives
- In office 1934–1937

Personal details
- Born: John Orlando Pastore; March 17, 1907 Providence, Rhode Island, U.S.
- Died: July 15, 2000 (aged 93) Cranston, Rhode Island, U.S.
- Party: Democratic
- Spouse: Elena Caito
- Children: 3
- Education: Northeastern University (LLB)

John Orlando Pastore (Note: Pronounced /pæˈstɔːri/ pa-STOR-ee.) (March 17, 1907 – July 15, 2000) was an American lawyer and politician. A member of the Democratic Party, he served as a United States senator from Rhode Island from 1950 to 1976 and as the 61st governor of Rhode Island from 1945 to 1950. He was the first Italian American elected to the Senate.

== Early life and education ==
John Pastore was born in the Federal Hill neighborhood of Providence, Rhode Island. The second of five children, he was the son of Michele and Erminia (née Asprinio) Pastore, who were Italian immigrants. His father, a tailor who had moved from Potenza to the United States in 1899, died when John was nine, and his mother went to work as a seamstress to support the family. She married her late husband's brother, Salvatore, who also ran a tailoring business. As a child, Pastore worked delivering coats and suits for his uncle/stepfather, as an errand boy in a law office, and as a foot-press operator in a jewelry factory.

Pastore graduated with honors from Classical High School in 1925, and spent a year working a $15-a-week job as a claims adjuster for the Narragansett Electric Company. In 1927, he enrolled in an evening law course given by Northeastern University at YMCA in Providence. He received a Bachelor of Laws degree (equivalent to a modern J.D. degree) in 1931, and was admitted to the bar the following year. He then established a law office in the basement of his family's home, but attracted few clients due to the Great Depression.

== Career ==
=== Rhode Island legislature ===
In 1934, Pastore was elected as a Democrat to the Rhode Island House of Representatives. He was re-elected in 1936, and became chairman of the House Corporations Committee. He served as an assistant attorney general from 1937 until 1938, when he lost that position after the Republican Party swept several statewide offices. He then served as a member of the Providence Charter Revision Commission from 1939 to 1940.

When the Democratic Party returned to power in 1940, Pastore was appointed assistant attorney general in charge of the criminal calendar, serving in that position until 1944. In July 1941, he married Elena Caito, to whom he remained married until his death; the couple had one son and two daughters.

=== Governor of Rhode Island ===
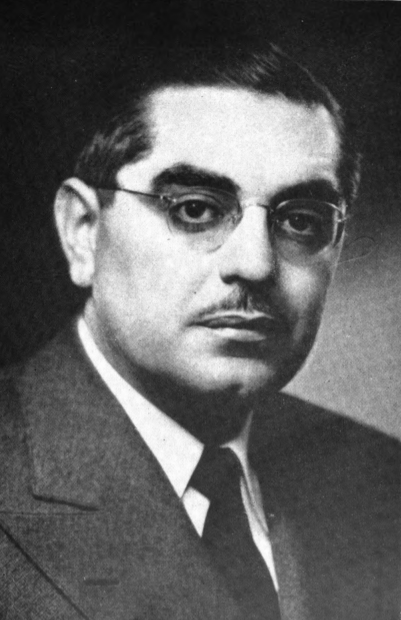
Pastore as governor

Pastore was elected Lieutenant Governor of Rhode Island in 1944. On October 6, 1945, he succeeded to the office of Governor of Rhode Island when Governor J. Howard McGrath resigned to become U.S. Solicitor General under President Harry S. Truman. During his first year in office, he established a one-percent sales tax.

In 1946, Pastore was elected to a full term as governor after defeating his Republican opponent, John G. Murphy, by a margin of 54% to 46%. With his victory, he became the first Italian American to be elected a governor in the United States; Charles Poletti, who served as Governor of New York in December 1942, also succeeded to office but never sought election in his own right. He was re-elected in 1948, defeating Warwick mayor Albert P. Ruerat by 61%-38%. During his tenure, he enacted the state's first primary election law and corporate income tax. He also created a program to combat water pollution and a $20 million bonus for World War II veterans. As chairman of the New England Governors' Conference, he called for a uniform nationwide unemployment insurance tax, either through "federalization of the program or some form of federal reinsurance".

=== U.S. Senate ===
In 1950, Pastore was elected to the United States Senate as a Democrat in a special election to succeed J. Howard McGrath, who had resigned in 1949 to become United States Attorney General (Edward L. Leahy held the office during a 16-month interim appointment). Pastore was reelected in 1952, 1958, 1964, and 1970.

In 1964, Pastore delivered the keynote address at the Democratic National Convention in Atlantic City, New Jersey, which nominated Lyndon B. Johnson for the presidency.

Pastore won his final senate race in 1970 by a 68%–32% margin over John McLaughlin, a Catholic priest who at the time opposed the Vietnam War. McLaughlin, who later left the priesthood, became more famous as the host of the television program The McLaughlin Group.

Pastore voted in favor of the Civil Rights Act of 1957, the Civil Rights Act of 1960, the 24th Amendment to the U.S. Constitution, the Civil Rights Act of 1964, the Voting Rights Act of 1965, the Medicare program, the Civil Rights Act of 1968, and the confirmation of Thurgood Marshall to the U.S. Supreme Court.

Fred Rogers testifies before the Senate Subcommittee on Communications, chaired by Pastore, on May 1, 1969.

Pastore served as the chairman of United States Senate Subcommittee on Communications. He is well remembered for taking part in a 1969 hearing involving a $20 million grant for the funding of PBS and the Corporation for Public Broadcasting proposed by former President Lyndon B. Johnson. President Richard Nixon wanted to cut the proposed funding to $10 million due to the demands of the Vietnam War. Fred Rogers, host of Mister Rogers' Neighborhood, appeared before the committee to argue for the full $20 million. In about six minutes of testimony, Rogers spoke of the need for social and emotional education that public television provided. Pastore was not familiar with Rogers' work, and was sometimes described as gruff and impatient, but he told Rogers that the testimony had given him goose bumps, and after Rogers recited the lyrics to "What Do You Do with the Mad that You Feel?", one of the songs from his show, Pastore declared: "I think it's wonderful. I think it's wonderful. Looks like you just earned the $20 million." The following year's appropriation increased PBS funding from $9 million to $22 million.

Pastore was mocked on The Smothers Brothers' final Comedy Hour, in a show scheduled for April 13, 1969, unaired due to network cancellation. In the show, Pastore was offered a ‘Flying Fickle Finger of Fate’ award. Tommy Smothers averred, “I have someone that’s very deserving I’d like to do it to,” because “[Pastore] says that everything is filth and gore on television,” and noting Pastore had said a French actress “shouldn’t be allowed on television” after wearing a low-cut evening gown on the Merv Griffin show.

In 1971, Pastore was one of twenty-five Senators to co-sponsor the Health Security Act, a bill that advocated health coverage for every person living in America through a government-run health insurance program.

In 1976, Pastore did not seek re-election, and retired from the Senate. In retirement, he served on the board of directors of Providence-based Columbus National Bank until its merger with Hospital Trust Bank in the late 1980s.

== Personal life ==
Pastore and his wife Elena had three children and seven grandchildren. He lived in Cranston, Rhode Island, until his death due to kidney failure on July 15, 2000.

His keynote speech at the 1964 Democratic National Convention has been called "The Speech Heard Round the World". The late Ted Kennedy eulogized: "My brother Jack had thought the world of him...John had a great heart." Pastore's private funeral service was held shortly after his death in 2000, in Cranston, Rhode Island.

The University of Rhode Island's Pastore Hall, completed in 1953, is named for Pastore. The building was initially home to the university's Department of Chemistry.

== Notes ==
Political offices
Preceded by Louis W. Cappelli	Lieutenant Governor of Rhode Island; 1945	Succeeded by John S. McKiernan
Preceded by J. Howard McGrath	Governor of Rhode Island; 1945–1950	Succeeded by John S. McKiernan
Party political offices
Preceded by J. Howard McGrath	Democratic nominee for Governor of Rhode Island; 1946, 1948	Succeeded by Dennis J. Roberts
Preceded by J. Howard McGrath	Democratic nominee for U.S. Senator from Rhode Island (Class 1); 1950, 1952, 1958, 1964, 1970	Succeeded by Richard Lorber
Preceded by Frank Church	Keynote Speaker of the Democratic National Convention; 1964	Succeeded by Daniel Inouye
U.S. Senate
Preceded by Edward L. Leahy	U.S. Senator (Class 1) from Rhode Island; 1950–1976; Served alongside: Theodore F. Green, Claiborne Pell	Succeeded by John Chafee
Preceded by Chet Holifield	Chair of the Joint Atomic Energy Committee; 1963–1965	Succeeded by Chet Holifield
Preceded by Chet Holifield	Chair of the Joint Atomic Energy Committee; 1967–1969	Succeeded by Chet Holifield
Preceded by Chet Holifield	Chair of the Joint Atomic Energy Committee; 1971–1973	Succeeded by Melvin Price
Preceded by Melvin Price	Chair of the Joint Atomic Energy Committee; 1975–1977	Succeeded by ???
