= United States energy independence =

Idea of eliminating the need for the United States to import foreign sources of energy

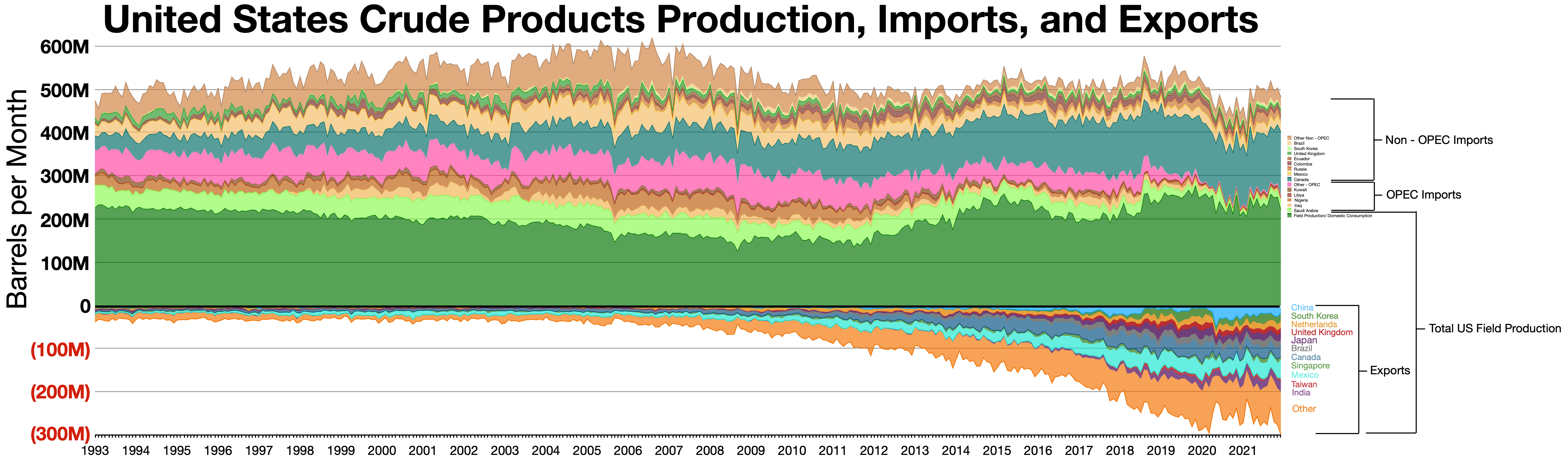
US oil production, imports, & exports

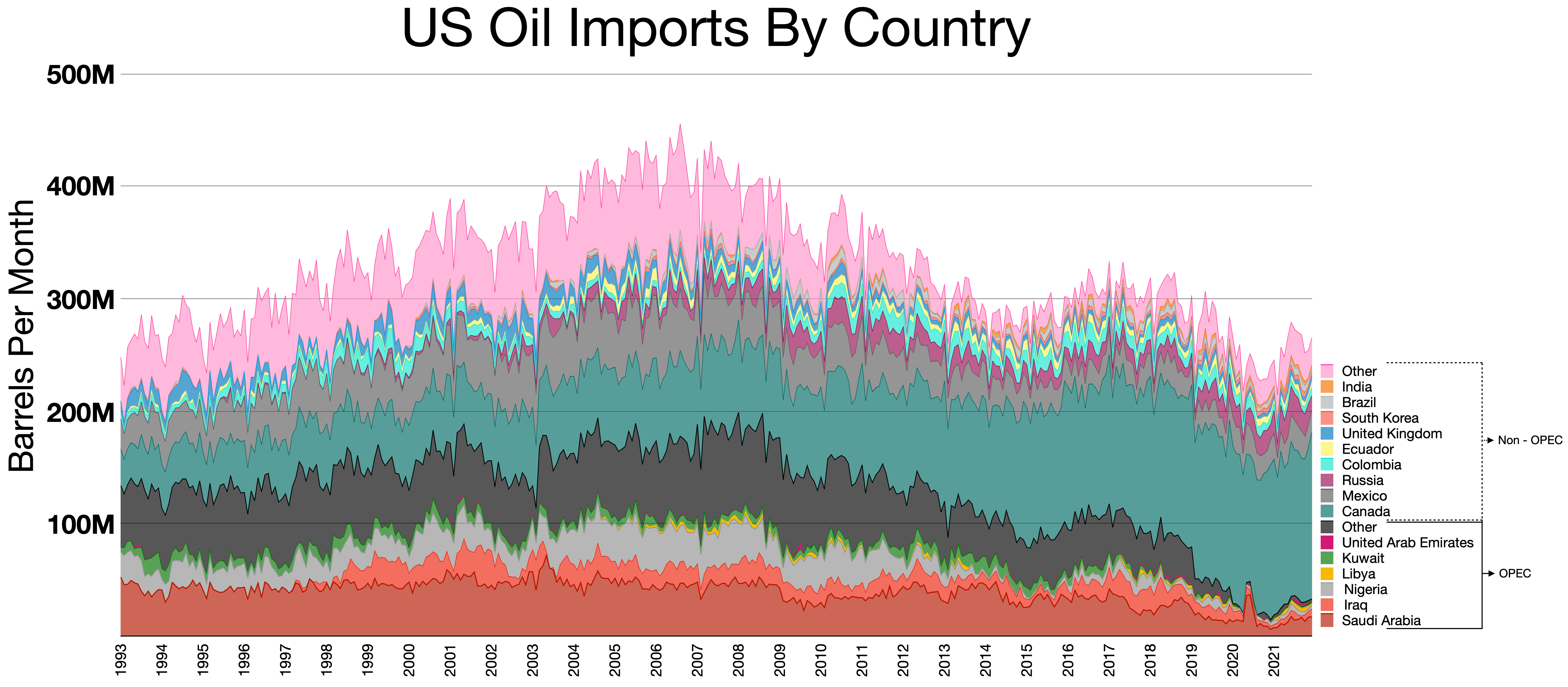
Oil imports by country

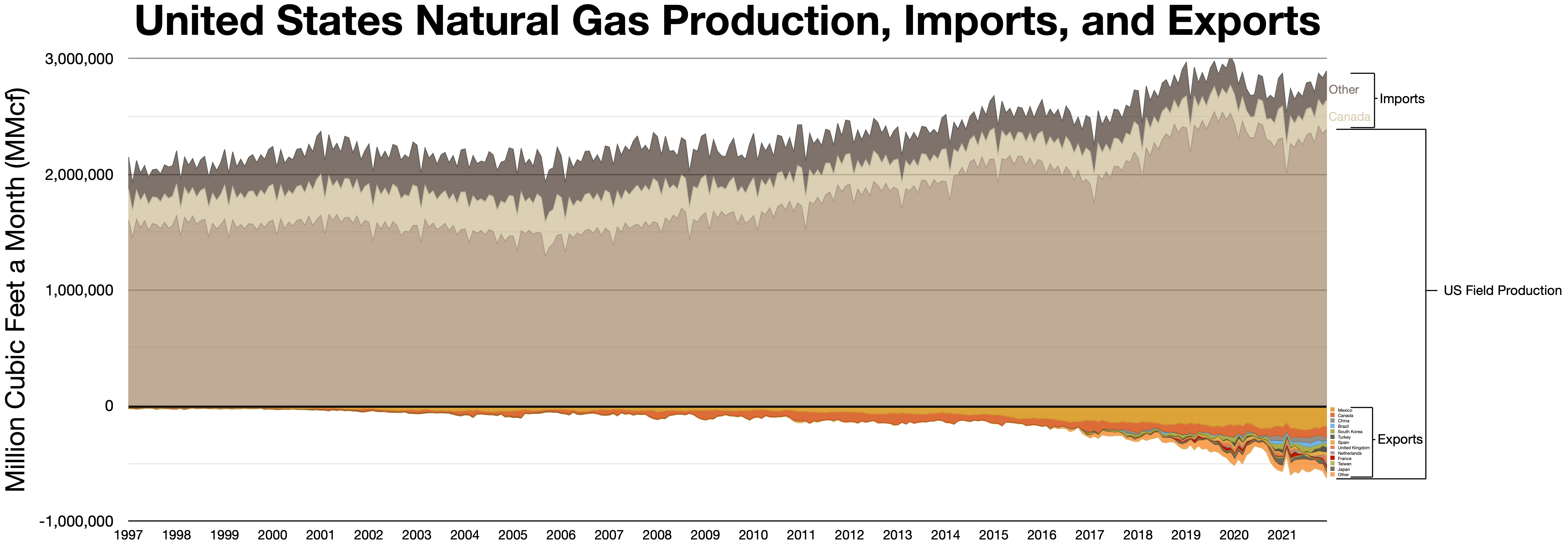
US natural gas production, imports, and exports

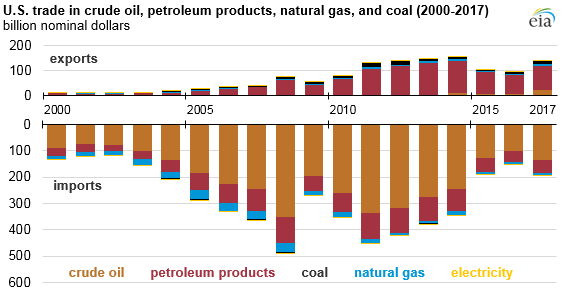
US energy product trade, 2000–2017

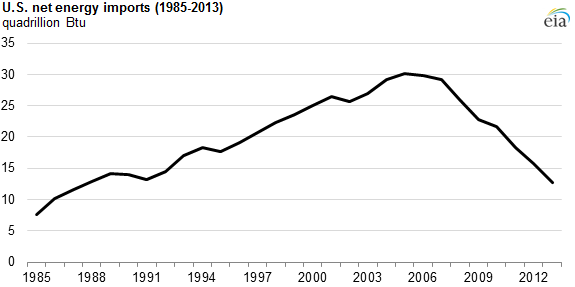
Trend of net energy imports into the United States, 1985–2013

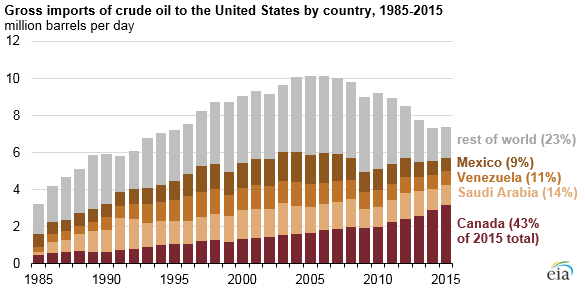
Sources of crude oil imports, 1985–2015

United States energy independence is the concept of eliminating or substantially reducing import of petroleum to satisfy the nation's need for energy. Some proposals for achieving energy independence would permit imports from the neighboring nations of Canada and Mexico, in which case it would be called North American energy independence. Energy independence is espoused by those who want to leave the US unaffected by global energy supply disruptions and would restrict reliance upon politically unstable states for its energy security.

In total energy consumption, the US produces more energy than it uses. In May 2011, the US became a net exporter of refined petroleum products. By 2014, the United States was the world's third largest producer of crude oil, after Saudi Arabia and Russia, and second-largest exporter of refined products, after Russia. In October 2019, the United States first became a net exporter of all oil products, including both refined petroleum products and crude oil. This was in the week ending October 18. During this week of "net exporter of all oil products, including both refined petroleum products and crude oil", "Weekly U.S. Commercial Crude Oil Imports Excluding SPR" were 5,857,000 barrels per day and exports were 3,683,000 barrels per day. In this week of "energy independence", the United States was still importing more crude oil than it was exporting. Weekly Production of Crude Oil for this week totaled 12,600,000 barrels per day. This "energy independence" occurred again during two weeks in December 2019. In 2020, this occurred in 38 weeks. It occurred 11 times in 2021 and it has occurred every week since the week ending March 11, 2022 through week ending May 5, 2023, (the most recent reporting of the EIA) 68 times. During the pandemic, weekly crude oil production dropped to a low of 9,700,000 barrels per day. As of week ending May 5, 2023, crude oil production had returned to pre-pandemic levels of 12,300,000 barrels per day. By 2021 the US was the world's largest producer.

As of March 2015, 85% of crude oil imports came from, in order of decreasing volume, Canada, Saudi Arabia, Mexico, Venezuela, and Colombia. Nineteen percent of imported oil came from the Middle East. The fraction of crude oil consumed in the US that was imported went from 35% immediately before the 1973 oil crisis, peaked at 60% in 2005, and then returned to 35% by 2013 thanks to increased domestic production from the shale oil boom. Beginning in the 1970s, exports of crude oil were illegal without a permit; in 2013, the United States physically exported a relatively small amount of oil, and only to Canada. The ban was repealed in 2015.

Greater energy self-sufficiency, it is claimed, would prevent major supply disruptions like the 1973 oil crisis and the 1979 energy crisis. Proponents argue that the potential for political unrest in major oil suppliers, such as Saudi Arabia, Venezuela, and Nigeria, is abundant, and often causes great fluctuations in crude oil prices, especially in the short term.

Large individual US pipelines and other fuel infrastructure and extraction projects are controversial issues in US politics.

== Historical trend ==
Trend of US net imports (imports minus exports) of natural gas, 1973–2017 (data from US EIA)

In the early 20th century the United States became a major oil supplier to the world. World War II prompted a Synthetic Liquid Fuels Program but it did not go beyond research. In mid-century the country shifted from being a major exporter to a net importer. An import quota imposed in 1959 (during the Dwight D. Eisenhower administration) limited imports to a fraction of domestic production until 1973. After the 1973 oil crisis, the United States Department of Energy and Synthetic Fuels Corporation were created to address the problem of fuel import dependency.

The US's dependence on foreign oil rose from 26 percent to 47 percent between 1985 and 1989. According to the Washington & Jefferson College Energy Index, by 2012, American energy independence had decreased by 22% since the Presidency of Harry Truman. The US's imports of foreign oil fell to 36 percent in 2013 (during the Barack Obama administration), down from a high of 60 percent in 2006 (during the George W. Bush administration).

Many proponents of energy independence look to the United States' untapped domestic oil reserves, either known or potential. Those who favor increasing domestic oil production often suggest removing many of the limitations on oil exploration in the Gulf of Mexico, the Arctic National Wildlife Refuge (see Arctic Refuge drilling controversy) and the outer continental shelf. Foreign dependence is not the only factor in North American energy politics, however; environmental concerns around land and water pollution and greenhouse gases are also matters of controversy.

== Approaches ==
Some proponents of US energy independence promote wider use of alternatives such as ethanol fuel, methanol, biodiesel, plug-in hybrids and other alternative propulsion. A 2013 report published by the Fuel Freedom Foundation said that without a shift to domestic feedstocks for fuel, such as natural gas and biomass, the US would not be able to achieve energy independence. As of 2014, the United States imposed an import tariff of 54 cents a gallon on ethanol fuel (there is no such import tariff on oil or methanol fuel). Ethanol fuel in Brazil is produced from sugarcane, which yields much more fuel per acre than the corn used for ethanol production in the United States.

In the United States, oil is primarily consumed as fuel for cars, buses, trucks and airplanes (in the form of gasoline, diesel and jet fuel). Two thirds of US oil consumption is due to the transportation sector. A national strategy designed to shift all transportation to a combined use of alternative fuels and plug-in hybrids is predicted to make the US independent of petroleum (oil).

=== North American energy independence ===
Oil imports are most problematic in domestic politics and energy security when they come from countries that are openly hostile to US foreign policy and interests (Iran, Venezuela, and formerly Iraq), are former or potential future rivals (Russia) or have questionable human rights practices (Saudi Arabia). Sometimes an alternative "North American energy independence" is proposed, by which North America as a unit should be energy independent, but in which the US could still import energy from Canada and Mexico, which are less problematic allies and more tightly economically integrated.

A related, less absolute, policy may be called North American energy security. In 2012 in an editorial to Canadian newspaper The Globe and Mail Mexican president elect Enrique Peña Nieto, called North American energy security a "common goal" of Canada and Mexico.

The benefits are argued to be similar to US energy independence—the reduction of North America's energy dependence on unstable regions such as the Middle East and South America and accepting supplies from the reliable North American Free Trade Area, reducing exposure to terrorism abroad; lower balance of trade and foreign exchange stresses on the US economy in an era when suppliers may begin to price oil in euros; the development of renewable energy sources to displace fossil fuels; and the promotion of energy conservation technology exportable to energy-poor nations.

=== Programs to limit US energy interests by Canada and Mexico ===
In Canada and Mexico there is also the concern not to have energy policy dictated by the United States, as well as tension over US ownership of energy companies.

In 1937 Mexico passed a constitutional amendment to nationalize its oil industry, which led to the creation of Pemex, the national oil company. There have been several proposals to privatize Pemex since, but they have never come to fruition as many Mexicans fear foreign control of this strategic industry.

The 1957 Canadian election was fought partially in response to the 1956 Pipeline Debate which concerned whether or not the government should allow a US-owned company to build a trans-Canadian gas pipeline and whether the route should be entirely within Canada or partly through the United States. The right-leaning Progressive Conservatives and leftist Co-operative Commonwealth Federation opposition parties opposed American involvement in the pipeline while the Liberal government supported it. The Liberals were defeated in the 1957 election.

In 1973 Canada created its own state energy company Petro-Canada. It began operations in 1976, though it bought assets from private companies rather than seizing them as in many other countries. In 1980 the National Energy Program was launched to create oil self-sufficiency within Canada. It attempted to use tax incentives to discourage oil exports (mostly from Western Canada, primarily the province of Alberta) to the US, and redirect these towards to the oil importing provinces of Eastern Canada. The Foreign Investment Review Agency was also created to screen foreign (mostly US) takeovers of Canadian companies. These policies were bitterly opposed by the provincial government of Alberta, and were repealed and reversed during the Conservative government of 1984–1993 which sought closer economic ties with the US, including the Canada–US Free Trade Agreement of 1988.

== US presidential views ==
=== Carter administration ===
In his Malaise speech, President Jimmy Carter declared that the United States will never again import as much oil as it did in 1977 (Carter),

=== Bush administration ===
In his 2006 State of the Union Address, President George W. Bush used the phrase addicted to oil, a phrase widely discussed in the media. Oil imports into the US peaked in 2006, when imports supplied nearly 12 million barrels/day which is 60% of US consumption; they have declined since, due both to increased domestic oil production, and reduced consumption.

=== Obama administration ===
In 2011, President Barack Obama released his Blueprint for a Secure Energy Future that aimed to reduce oil dependence by a third, by producing more oil domestically, increasing use of cleaner alternative fuels, and improving efficiency. Obama stated, "The fact of the matter is, is that for quite some time, America is going to be still dependent on oil in making its economy work."

In 2012, Obama repeatedly stated that the US had begun "freeing ourselves from foreign oil." Canadian observers noted that his usage of "foreign" did not include Canada. Obama called Canada and Mexico "stable" foreign energy suppliers.

=== Keystone XL Pipeline - Obama vs. Trump ===
The Keystone XL pipeline from Alberta to the Gulf Coast would expedite processing of Canadian oil. In November 2015, Obama rejected the proposal to build this pipeline because of domestic environmental concerns over water quality as well as the general antipathy of the environmental movement to pipeline building, and the production practices in the source (the Athabasca oil sands).

In March 2017, President Donald J. Trump announced the granting of a permit for construction of the Keystone XL pipeline, calling it "the first of many infrastructure projects" that he intended to approve in order to put more Americans to work. The permitting came two months after Trump, only days into his presidency, signed an executive order aimed at reviving the Keystone XL and Dakota Access pipelines.

=== Trump administration ===
In May 2017, President Donald J. Trump promised "complete" independence from foreign sources of oil.

During his administration's Energy Week celebration of June 2017, President Trump announced that he was formally seeking a review of US energy policies, in order to help the Nuclear power industry prosper. Trump also announced that the Interior Department would be kicking off the formal process to expand areas available for offshore drilling of oil and natural gas. He vowed to create "American energy dominance".

The value of US LNG exports was estimated to reach nearly $5 billion in 2018 and $12 billion in 2019.

In early December 2018, it was reported by Bloomberg that the US had turned into a net exporter of oil "last week", thus breaking nearly 75 continuous years of dependence on foreign oil. Reportedly, the US sold overseas a net of 211,000 barrels a day of crude and refined products such as gasoline and diesel. This, compared to net imports of about three million barrels a day on average previously during 2018 and the prior annual peak of more than 12 million barrels a day during 2005, was confirmed by the US Energy Information Administration. This occurred not because of an increase in crude oil production, as it remained at 11,700,000 per day, it occurred because of an over 1,000,000 barrel per day increase in crude oil exports that came from an equal reduction in Crude Oil Stock. The next week, the Weekly US Imports of Crude Oil and Petroleum Products returned to 1,322,000 barrels per day.

In March 2019, crude oil prices regained momentum after reports showed an unexpected drop in US fuel supplies. The American Petroleum Institute reported domestic crude inventories declined 2.58 million barrels the previous week. The US Energy Information Administration was due to report on the official numbers on domestic supply and demand. However, James Williams, president at WTRG Economics in London, Arkansas said, "These are clearly bullish numbers, and if reinforced it will be more bullish".

It wasn't until January 2020 that Weekly US Field Production of Crude Oil hit 13,000,000 barrels per day and at this level, consistently made the US a net exporter of Crude Oil and Petroleum Products. By May, as the COVID-19 pandemic took hold, production dropped to 11,900,000 barrels per day and then by the end of August to 9,700,000 barrels per day. Even at these low levels of production, the US remained a net exporter due to the suppression of demand.

=== Biden administration ===
In January 2021, when President Joseph R. Biden Jr. became president, the United States was still "energy independent" even though domestic crude oil production had declined to 10,900,000 barrels of crude oil per day from its 13,100,000 peak. As demand recovered from the pandemic, the United States lost its "energy independence" until it regained it in the end of 2021, even though, domestic weekly production of crude oil had only grown to 11,500,000 barrels per day. By the week ending March 18, 2022, the United States regained its "energy independence" with daily production only increasing by 100,000 barrels of crude oil per day; it has maintained it ever since.

While the Biden administration has often been maligned for its efforts to migrate to renewable energy and its opponents have promised to return the United States to "energy independence," the United States has been "energy independent" for 80 of the 142 weeks of President Biden's term in office and has been continuously since March 2022. By the definition commonly used, the United States is energy independent.

== Benefits of oil dependence ==
In a 2012 poll of energy experts by Foreign Policy magazine, almost two-thirds of respondents said energy independence was not a sensible goal.

Highlighting the difficulty of separating domestic and foreign oil sources, journalist Robert Bryce stated in 2008 that "the trends of energy interdependence are growing and are inexorable" and branded the idea of being able to choose where your oil came from as "hogwash".

The structure of the argument of critics is arranged as follows:

1. Energy independence will not decrease US involvement in the Middle East.
  1. Interests in the Persian Gulf, including the protection of worldwide energy security upon which the global economy is dependent, will remain a US priority.
  2. Terrorism will not decline in the Middle East if the US ceases to buy oil, because terrorism is not funded by oil money.
  3. Although vast oil supplies are found in an unstable region subject to difficult geopolitics, these geopolitics will continue to be fueled by other large consumers of oil, such as China, whether or not the US achieves energy independence. US energy independence will not cause a US pull-out from the Middle East, it will not decrease terrorism, and it will not foster stability or reform in the region.
2. Renewable energy sources can be extremely inefficient, as in the case of corn-based biofuels, which requires massive government subsidies and also enormous amounts of water and chemicals to grow, and causes significant air pollution when burned. Other renewables, namely wind and solar power, are expensive and intermittent, and lack the infrastructure and technology needed to properly store the energy they harness from the environment:
  1. Natural gas was not a viable portion of US energy as of 2008, since we may have peaked in domestic reserves: US imports of natural gas from Canada tripled since 1973.
    1. However, US gross natural gas production set new all-time record highs each year from 2007 through 2013, due in part to new methods to extract Shale gas. Despite record withdrawals, the volume of US proved reserves still in the ground also stands at an all-time high, according to reserve data for the end of 2011. US net imports of natural gas peaked in 2007, then declined rapidly, and in 2013 were 60 percent below 2007.
  2. In the absence of breeder reactors or fusion reactors, nuclear power plants aren't a solution to energy independence either, since uranium must be imported: currently, 80% of US uranium is imported, mainly from Russia and Canada.
  3. Although the US enjoys massive coal reserves able to power the country at current rates of energy consumption for 200 years, the hope that the country could use this resource as a liquid to fuel the transportation sector is unlikely. Although currently the US remains a net coal exporter of lower-quality coal, a large and, as of 2008, increasing portion of coal is being imported due to the cheaper, high-quality, low-sulfur foreign coal needed by power plants coping with air-quality regulations.
    1. However, from 2007 to 2011, US coal imports fell by 64%, and coal exports rose by 81%. As of 2011, coal exports from the US were eight times the tonnage of imports, and the US was the world's fourth-largest exporter of coal.
  4. US oil reserves cannot be relied upon: US oil production in 2008 had been steadily declining since 1970.
    1. From that point, US oil production rose rapidly during 2009–2013; US crude oil production for 2013 was 49% higher than that of 2008.
  5. Energy-efficient electrical and electronic devices require rare earth elements which mostly come from Inner Mongolia, and lithium, which mostly comes from the Salar de Uyuni in Bolivia.

In 2008, Roger Howard has argued in The Wall Street Journal that oil dependence has significant benefits for the US and other oil-importing nations. First, the world's major oil exporters are highly dependent on their oil revenues, and fear rapid drops in the price of oil, such as occurred in late 2008 and in 2014/2015. Second, this fear restrains destructive actions by exporters: Howard cites the example of Russia's 2008 invasion of Georgia. Russia's stock market plunged, and "within a week capital outflow reached a massive $16 billion, suddenly squeezing domestic credit while the ruble collapsed in value." He also gives the example of Libya, where Muammar al-Gaddafi gave up his nuclear weapon program in exchange for the US lifting its economic sanctions, which had prevented Libya from increasing its oil production.

In 2008, Andy Grove argued that energy independence is a flawed and infeasible objective, particularly in a network of integrated global exchange. He suggests instead that the objective should be energy resilience: resilience goes hand in hand with adaptability, and it also is reflected in important market ideas like substitutability. Resilience is one of the best features of market processes; the information transmission function of prices means that individual buyers and sellers can adapt to changes in supply and demand conditions in a decentralized way. His suggestion for how to increase the resilience of the US energy economy is to shift use from petroleum to electricity (electrification), that can be produced using multiple sources of energy, including renewables.

== Green Energy ==
In 2008, former vice president Al Gore challenged the United States to commit to producing all electricity from renewable sources (AERS) like solar and wind power in 10 years. Both the Center for Resource Solutions and former president Barack Obama have publicly stated they support Al Gore's AERS goal.

Canada is the world's second largest producer of hydroelectricity (after China) and exported three billion dollars' worth of electricity to the US in 2015, mostly from the major hydro-producing provinces of Québec, Ontario, Manitoba and British Columbia.

== See also ==
- Autarky
- Carter Doctrine
- Electric car
- Energy independence
- Energy Independence and Security Act of 2007
- Ethanol fuel in the United States
- Nuclear power
- Oil battle
- Peak oil
- Phase-out of fossil fuel vehicles
- Pickens Plan
- Securing America's Energy Independence Act of 2007
- Solar power in the United States
- Sustainable energy
- Wind engineering
- Zero emission
