= 1958 United States Senate election in Rhode Island =

- November 4, 1958
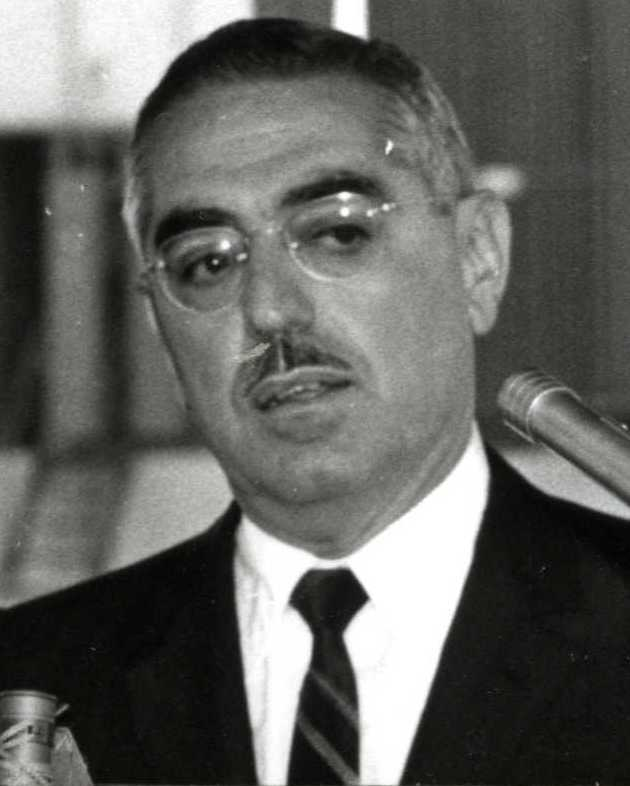

Nominee	John Pastore	Bayard Ewing
Party	Democratic	Republican
Popular vote	222,166	122,353
Percentage	64.49%	35.51%
- Pastore: 50–60% 60–70% 70–80% Ewing: 50–60% 60–70% Tie: 50%
U.S. senator before election
John Pastore
Democratic
Elected U.S. Senator
John Pastore
Democratic

The 1958 United States Senate election in Rhode Island took place on November 4, 1958. Incumbent Democratic U.S. Senator John Pastore successfully sought re-election, defeating Republican Bayard Ewing in a repeat of their 1952 race.

== Primary elections ==
The Democratic primary was held on September 17, 1958, and the Republican primary was held on September 25, 1958.

=== Democratic primary ===
==== Candidates ====
- John Pastore, incumbent U.S. Senator

==== Results ====
Democratic primary results
Party	Candidate	Votes	%
Democratic	John Pastore (Incumbent)		unopposed

=== Republican primary ===
==== Candidates ====
- Bayard Ewing, attorney, Republican national committeeman, Republican nominee for Senate in 1952

==== Results ====
Republican primary results
Party	Candidate	Votes	%
Republican	Bayard Ewing		unopposed

== General election ==
=== Results ===
General election results
Party	Candidate	Votes	%
Democratic	John Pastore (Incumbent)	222,166	64.49
Republican	Bayard Ewing	122,353	35.51
Majority		99,813	28.98
Turnout		344,519	
Democratic hold			

== Bibliography ==
- Congressional Elections, 1946-1996. Washington, D.C.: Congressional Quarterly Inc. 1998. ISBN 1-56802-248-4.
- Official Count of the Ballots Cast for United States Senator, Representatives in Congress, General Officers, and Senators and Representatives in the General Assembly, 1958 (PDF). Board of Elections of Rhode Island. 1960.
