= Jack Germond =

American journalist, author, and pundit

- Born: John Worthen Germond; January 30, 1928; Boston, Massachusetts, U.S.
- Died: August 14, 2013 (aged 85); Charles Town, West Virginia, U.S.
- Education: University of Missouri
- Occupations: Journalist; author
- Known for: Panelist on The McLaughlin Group
- Spouse: Barbara Wippler (m. 1951, divorced) Alice Travis (m. 1995)
- Children: 4

John Worthen Germond (January 30, 1928 – August 14, 2013) was an American journalist, author, and pundit whose career spanned over 50 years. Germond wrote for the Washington Star and the Baltimore Sun, and was a longtime panelist on the television discussion show The McLaughlin Group. Together with Jules Witcover, Germond also co-wrote "Politics Today," a five-day-a-week syndicated column, for almost a quarter-century.

== Early years ==
Germond was born in Boston, Massachusetts. After serving in the U.S. Army as a paymaster, Germond graduated from the University of Missouri with a degree in journalism and history.

== Career ==
Germond began his career in 1951 writing for the Evening News in Monroe, Michigan. In 1953, he moved to Gannett's Rochester Times-Union, and he was chief of Gannett's Washington bureau from 1969 until 1973. In 1974, he joined the Washington Star, becoming a syndicated columnist and national editor, and went on to the Baltimore Sun when the Washington Star folded.

On television, Germond began appearing on Meet the Press in 1972 and The Today Show in 1980. He was a fixture on The McLaughlin Group from the show's inception in 1982, acting as a "liberal voice" against conservative guests such as Pat Buchanan and Robert Novak. When The McLaughlin Group was parodied on Saturday Night Live in the early 1990s, Germond was portrayed by Chris Farley and John Goodman. Germond left the program in 1996, citing a decline in the show's discourse and frustration with John McLaughlin's heavy-handed moderation. He was later featured as a panelist on the PBS program Inside Washington.

Germond retired in 2000. In 2011, he wrote several pieces on the 2012 presidential election for The Daily Beast, an online-only publication.

== Personal life ==
Germond married Barbara Wippler in 1951. They had two daughters, Mandy and Jessica, before divorcing. In 1995, Germond married Alice Travis, a former secretary of the Democratic National Committee. Germond was stepfather to Alice's two children, Abby and David, from her prior marriage.

Germond died at his home in Charles Town, West Virginia on August 14, 2013, aged 85.

== Bibliography ==
=== With Witcover ===
- Blue Smoke & Mirrors: How Reagan Won and Why Carter Lost the Election of 1980, Viking Press (1981)
- Jack W. Germond; Jules Witcover (1985). Wake Us When It's Over: Presidential Politics of 1984. Simon & Schuster. ISBN 978-0-02-630710-9.
- Whose Broad Stripes and Bright Stars? The Trivial Pursuit of the Presidency 1988, Warner Books (1989)
- Mad As Hell: Revolt at the Ballot Box 1992, Warner Books (1992)

=== Solo ===
- Fat Man in a Middle Seat: Forty Years of Covering Politics. Random House. January 8, 2002. ISBN 978-0-375-75867-6.
- Fat Man Fed Up: How American Politics Went Bad. Random House Trade Paperbacks. 2005. ISBN 978-0-8129-7092-0.
