= Washington & Jefferson College Energy Index =

The Washington & Jefferson College Energy Index is an index measuring American energy independence. The Index describes the amount of energy produced in America versus the total energy consumption in America. On a scale of 1 to 100, 1 represents total dependence and 100 represents total independence. In 2012, the Index was 74. Regional figures are produced, and historical figures have been developed back to 1949. The Index showed that by 2012, American energy independence had decreased by 22% since the tenure of President Harry Truman.

The Index is authored by Professors Leslie Dunn and Robert Dunn, of the Washington & Jefferson College Department of Economics and Business. The Index utilizes publicly available energy data, analyzed with a proprietary algorithm. Additionally, the energy index has also been used to analyze more local energy use, including Washington & Jefferson College energy use in dormitories from 2001-2012.

The index is reproduced as an infographic by the Associated Press for national distribution.

The Index was unveiled in 2012's W&J Energy Summit, with Susan Eisenhower, of The Eisenhower Institute, and journalist Eleanor Clift leading the discussions.
