= 1948 Rhode Island gubernatorial election =

- November 2, 1948
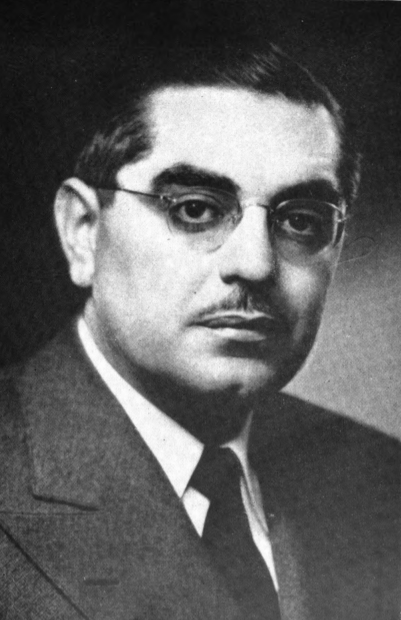

Nominee	John Pastore	Albert P. Ruerat
Party	Democratic	Republican
Popular vote	198,056	124,441
Percentage	61.15%	38.42%
- Pastore: 50–60% 60–70% 70–80% Ruerat: 50–60% 60–70% 70–80%
Governor before election
John Pastore
Democratic
Elected Governor
John Pastore
Democratic

The 1948 Rhode Island gubernatorial election was held on November 2, 1948. Incumbent Democrat John Pastore defeated Republican nominee Albert P. Ruerat with 61.15% of the vote.

== General election ==
=== Candidates ===
- Clemens J. France (Progressive)
- John Pastore, incumbent Governor since 1945 (Democratic)
- Albert P. Ruerat (Republican)

=== Results ===
1948 Rhode Island gubernatorial election
Party	Candidate	Votes	%	±%
Democratic	John Pastore (incumbent)	198,056	61.15%	
Republican	Albert P. Ruerat	124,441	38.42%	
Progressive	Clemens J. France	1,366	0.42%	
Majority		73,615		
Turnout		323,863		
Democratic hold		Swing		
