= 1970 United States Senate election in Rhode Island =

- November 3, 1970
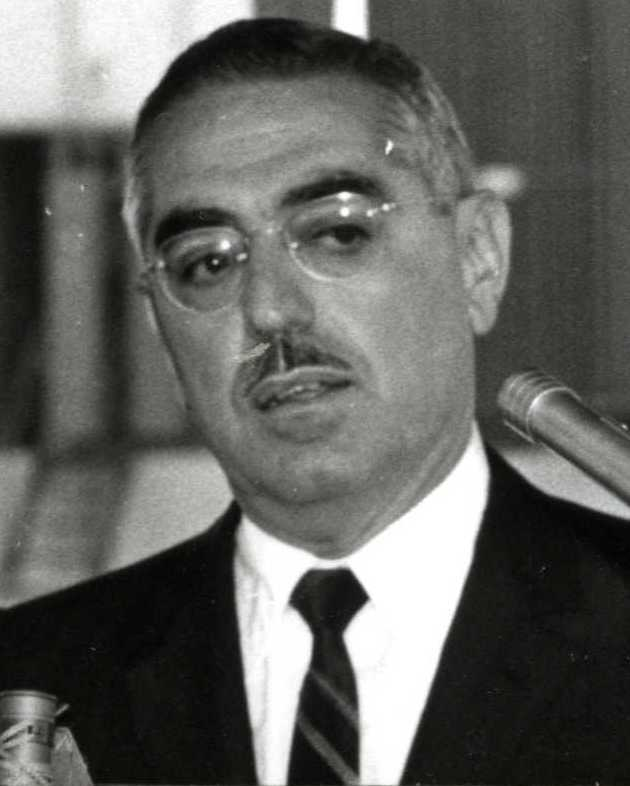

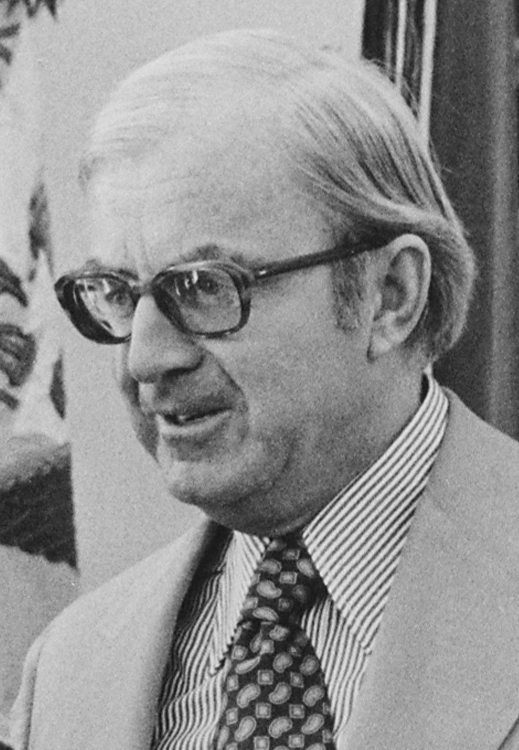
Nominee	John Pastore	John McLaughlin
Party	Democratic	Republican
Popular vote	230,469	107,351
Percentage	67.54%	31.46%
- Pastore: 50–60% 60–70% 70–80% McLaughlin: 50–60%
U.S. senator before election
John Pastore
Democratic
Elected U.S. Senator
John Pastore
Democratic

The 1970 United States Senate election in Rhode Island took place on November 3, 1970. Incumbent Democratic U.S. Senator John Pastore successfully sought re-election, defeating Republican John McLaughlin. This was the last election until 2006 in which a Democrat was elected to Rhode Island's Class 1 Senate seat.

== Democratic primary ==
=== Candidates ===
- John Pastore, incumbent U.S. Senator since 1950
- John Quattrocchi

=== Results ===
Democratic primary results
Party	Candidate	Votes	%
Democratic	John Pastore (inc.)	54,090	88.06
Democratic	John Quattrocchi	7,332	11.94
Majority		46,758	76.13%
Total votes		61,422	100.00

== Republican primary ==
=== Candidates ===
- John McLaughlin

== General election ==
=== Results ===
General election results
Party	Candidate	Votes	%
Democratic	John Pastore (inc.)	230,469	67.54
Republican	John McLaughlin	107,351	31.46
Peace and Freedom	David N. Fenton	2,406	0.71
Socialist Workers	Daniel B. Fein	996	0.29
Majority		123,118	36.08%
Total votes		341,222	100.00
Democratic hold			
