= 1946 Rhode Island gubernatorial election =

- November 5, 1946
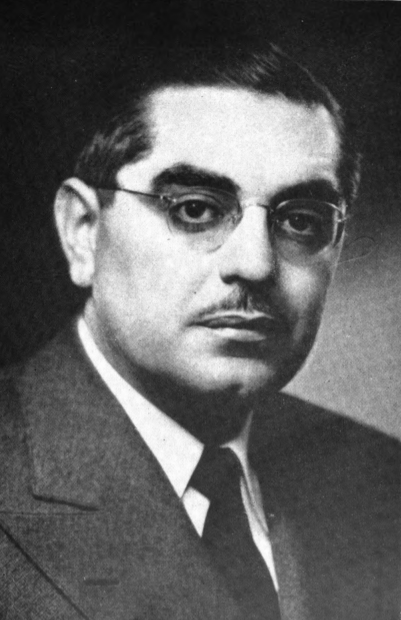

Nominee	John Pastore	John G. Murphy
Party	Democratic	Republican
Popular vote	148,885	125,456
Percentage	54.27%	45.73%
- Pastore: 50–60% 60–70% Murphy: 50–60% 60–70% 70–80% 80–90%
Governor before election
John Pastore
Democratic
Elected Governor
John Pastore
Democratic

The 1946 Rhode Island gubernatorial election was held on November 5, 1946. Incumbent Democrat John Pastore defeated Republican nominee John G. Murphy with 54.27% of the vote.

== General election ==
=== Candidates ===
- John Pastore, incumbent Governor since 1945 (Democratic)
- John G. Murphy (Republican)

=== Results ===
1946 Rhode Island gubernatorial election
Party	Candidate	Votes	%	±%
Democratic	John Pastore (incumbent)	148,885	54.27%	
Republican	John G. Murphy	125,456	45.73%	
Majority		23,429		
Turnout		275,341		
Democratic hold		Swing		
