= The Afternoon Delights =

American vocal studio quartet

- Origin: Boston, Massachusetts, U.S.
- Years active: 1981
- Label: MCA
- Past members: Rebecca Hall; Janet Powell; Robalee Barnes; Suzanne Boucher

The Afternoon Delights were a Boston-based vocal studio quartet, including Rebecca Hall, Janet Powell, Robalee Barnes, and Suzanne Boucher.

== Career ==
In 1981, the Afternoon Delights released the novelty song "General Hospi-Tale" that lyrically summarized some of the plot developments on the ABC soap opera General Hospital. The song was co-written by Harry King (who also produced) and Lisa "Lips" Tedesco, a soap updater for Medford-based station Kiss 108. Hall sang the lead vocal, including the spoken word portion at the end talking about her "addiction", noting "I just can't cope/without my soap!" Musically, meanwhile, the track was very reminiscent of Blondie's recent hit "Rapture". "General Hospi-Tale" peaked at number 23 on Billboard's Hot Soul Singles chart and number 33 on the Billboard Hot 100 chart. Despite its modest chart placings, "General Hospi-Tale" (the single) sold 850,000 7-inch singles and 250,000 12-inch copies.

The group quickly released a follow-up single ("Dancing For Pennies", which was a non-novelty pop/R&B tune.) An Afternoon Delights album called General Hospi-Tale was also released, which was a straight pop/R&B release, aside from the title track. These both failed to chart, and the group quickly disbanded. Hall later recorded some solo singles in the mid-1980s, and Barnes and Boucher both continued work as studio vocalists.

The song was integrated into a movie, Young Doctors in Love, which had a successful run on cable channels in the US and abroad.

General Hospital revisited the group's single in an episode that aired on April 28, 2013, as part of the series' 50th anniversary.
