= 1952 United States Senate election in Rhode Island =

- November 4, 1952
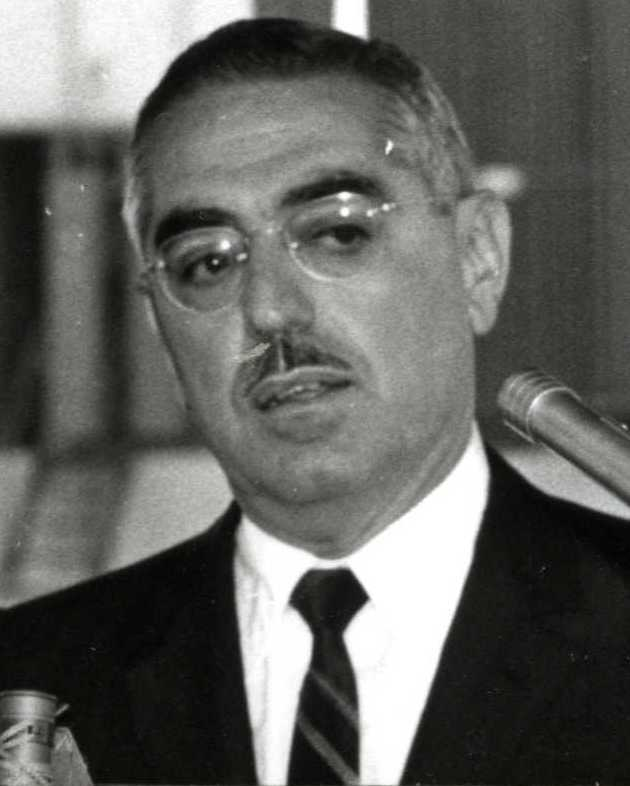

Nominee	John Pastore	Bayard Ewing
Party	Democratic	Republican
Popular vote	225,128	185,850
Percentage	54.78%	45.22%
- Pastore: 50–60% 60–70% Ewing: 50–60% 60–70% 70–80%
U.S. senator before election
John Pastore
Democratic
Elected U.S. Senator
John Pastore
Democratic

The 1952 United States Senate election in Rhode Island took place on November 4, 1952. Incumbent Democratic U.S. Senator John Pastore was re-elected to a second term in office.

== Primary elections ==
The Republican primary was held on September 15, 1952, and the Democratic primary was held on September 24, 1952.

=== Democratic primary ===
==== Candidate ====
- John Pastore, incumbent U.S. Senator

==== Results ====
Democratic primary results
Party	Candidate	Votes	%
Democratic	John Pastore (Incumbent)	unopposed	

=== Republican primary ===
==== Candidate ====
- Bayard Ewing, State Representative

==== Results ====
Republican primary results
Party	Candidate	Votes	%
Republican	Bayard Ewing	unopposed	

== General election ==
=== Results ===
General election results
Party	Candidate	Votes	%
Democratic	John Pastore (Incumbent)	225,128	54.78
Republican	Bayard Ewing	185,663	
Clean Government	Bayard Ewing	187	
Total	Bayard Ewing	185,850	45.22
Majority		39,278	9.56
Turnout		410,978	
Democratic hold			

== Bibliography ==
- Congressional Elections, 1946-1996. Washington, D.C.: Congressional Quarterly Inc. 1998. ISBN 1-56802-248-4.
- Official Count of the Ballots Cast for Presidential Electors, United States Senator, Representatives in Congress, General Officers, and Senators and Representatives in the General Assembly etc (PDF). Board of Elections of Rhode Island. 1952.
