= Securing America's Energy Independence Act of 2007 =

On January 18, 2007, Congressmen Michael McNulty (D-NY) and Dave Camp (R-MI) introduced legislation to reinvest funds in America's most abundant renewable resource – solar power. Title: "Securing America's Energy Independence Act of 2007.", H.R. 550 January 18, 2007: Referred to the House Committee on Ways and Means.

February 14, 2007 – Senators Gordon H. Smith (R-OR) and Ken Salazar (D-CO) introduced legislation to stimulate investment in America's most abundant renewable resource – solar power. Title: "Securing America's Energy Independence Act of 2007.", S. 590 February 14, 2007 Referred to Senate committee. Status: Read twice and referred to the Committee on Finance.
