= Eleanor Clift =

American political journalist, pundit, and author

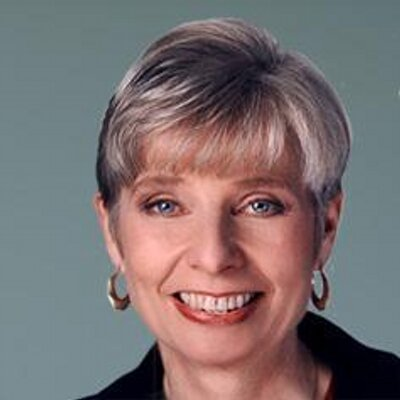
- Clift in 1999
- Born: Eleanor Irene Roeloffs; July 7, 1940 (age 85); New York City, U.S.
- Occupation: Journalist
- Notable credit(s): The Daily Beast; MSNBC; The McLaughlin Group
- Spouses: William Brooks Clift Jr. (m. 1964; div. 1981) Tom Brazaitis (m. 1989; died 2005)
- Children: 3
- Relatives: Montgomery Clift (brother-in-law)
- Website: eleanorclift.com

Eleanor Irene Clift (née Roeloffs; born July 7, 1940) is an American political journalist, television pundit, and author. She is a contributor to MSNBC and blogger for The Daily Beast. She is best known as a regular panelist on The McLaughlin Group. Clift is a board member at the IWMF (International Women's Media Foundation).

== Early years ==
Eleanor Roeloffs was born in the New York City borough of Brooklyn, the daughter of German immigrants from the island of Föhr in the North Sea. She grew up in the Jackson Heights neighborhood of Queens, where her parents ran a delicatessen in Sunnyside. Clift was raised a Lutheran. She attended both Hofstra University and Hunter College, but left both schools without a degree.

== Journalism career ==
Clift began her career in 1963 as a secretary at Newsweek, and was one of the first female reporters to earn an internship from the secretary pool. Working out of Atlanta, Clift became the reporter assigned to cover the then-unlikely candidate, Jimmy Carter. Clift traveled with the campaign and reported from the road. After Carter's win, Clift became White House correspondent for Newsweek and has covered every presidential campaign for the magazine since 1976. When Newsweek merged with The Daily Beast in 2010, Clift stayed on to cover politics for the online publication.

== Broadcasting career ==
She began a broadcast career on The Diane Rehm Show on WAMU-FM, Washington, D.C., as a Friday week-in-review panelist. She became known to listeners for her good-natured acceptance of ribbing from other panelists and callers to the program.

She became a regular panelist on the nationally syndicated show The McLaughlin Group, which she has compared to "a televised food fight".

Her role as a talk show panelist has led to appearances in movies. Clift played a panelist in Rising Sun (1993) and appeared as herself in Dave (1993), Independence Day (1996) and Getting Away with Murder (1996). She was portrayed by Jan Hooks on Saturday Night Live. She was also portrayed by actress Mary Ann Burger in the 2009 film Watchmen.

In 2008, she wrote Two Weeks of Life: A Memoir of Love, Death, and Politics, which intertwines the events of her own life and those of the nation concerning the Terri Schiavo case during a two-week period in March 2005. In it she examines the way people in the United States deal with death, publicity and personality.

She was a keynote speaker at the 2012 Washington & Jefferson College Energy Summit, where the Washington & Jefferson College Energy Index was unveiled.

Contributing to the anthology Our American Story (2019), Clift addressed the possibility of a shared American narrative and focused on America as a social movement, writing, "[S]ocial movements are America's story, and they're my story as a woman born in the middle of the last century whose life was made measurably better amid these broad strokes of history."

=== Honors ===
- Hoover Institution William and Barbara Edwards Media Fellow September 16–22, 2002

== Personal life ==
Clift married William Brooks Clift Jr. (1919–1986), the older brother of actor Montgomery Clift, in 1964 with whom she had three sons. They divorced in 1981.

In 1989, Clift married Tom Brazaitis, a Washington columnist for ‘‘The Plain Dealer’’ in Cleveland, Ohio. They remained together until his death from kidney cancer in 2005.

== Bibliography ==
External videos
- Booknotes interview with Clift and Brazaitas on War Without Bloodshed, August 25, 1996, C-SPAN
- Presentation by Clift and Brazaitis on War Without Bloodshed, December 2, 1997, C-SPAN
- Washington Journal interview with Clift and Brazaitis on Madam President, July 3, 2000, C-SPAN
- Discussion with Clift and Evan Thomas on Election 2004: How Bush Won and What You Can Expect in the Future, January 20, 2005, C-SPAN
- Presentation by Clift on Two Weeks of Life: A Memoir of Love, Death and Politics at the National Press Club, March 17, 2008, C-SPAN
- Presentation by Clift on Selecting a President, May 24, 2012, C-SPAN

- Clift, Eleanor (1996). War Without Bloodshed: The Art of Politics. New York: Simon & Schuster. ISBN 0-684-80084-5.
- Clift, Eleanor (2000). Madam President: Shattering the Last Glass Ceiling. New York: Scribner. ISBN 0-684-85619-0.
- Clift, Eleanor (2003). Founding Sisters and the Nineteenth Amendment. Hoboken: John Wiley & Sons. ISBN 0-471-42612-1.
- Clift, Eleanor (2004). Election 2004: How Bush Won and What You Can Expect in the Future. New York: PublicAffairs. ISBN 1-58648-293-9.
- Clift, Eleanor (2008). Two Weeks of Life: A Memoir of Love, Death, and Politics. New York: Basic Books. ISBN 978-0-465-00251-1.
- Eleanor Clift and Matthew Spieler (2012). Selecting a President. New York: Thomas Dunne Books. ISBN 978-1-250-00449-9
