= John McLaughlin (host) =

American journalist and political commentator (1927–2016)

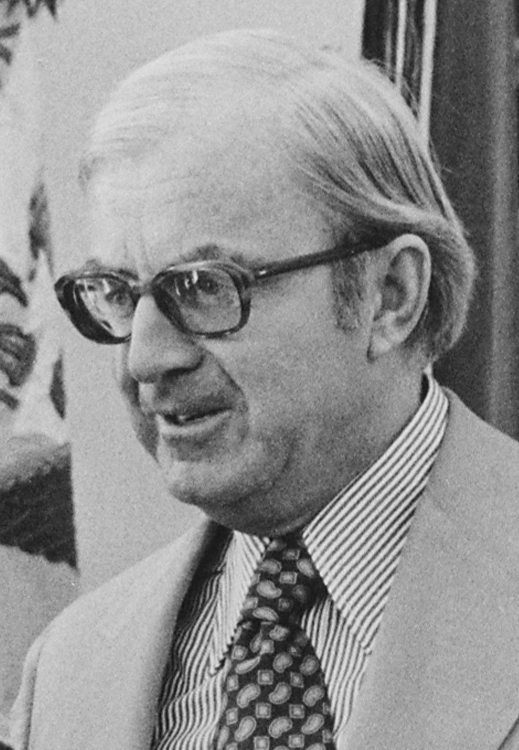
- McLaughlin at the White House in 1974
- Born: John Joseph McLaughlin; March 29, 1927; Providence, Rhode Island, U.S.
- Died: August 16, 2016 (aged 89); Washington, D.C., U.S.
- Education: Boston College (BA, MA); Columbia University (PhD)
- Known for: The McLaughlin Group; John McLaughlin's One on One
- Political party: Democratic (before 1970); Republican (1970–2016)
- Spouses: Ann Lauenstein (m. 1975; div. 1992); Cristina Vidal (m. 1997; div. 2010)

John Joseph McLaughlin (/məkˈlɑːklɪn/ March 29, 1927 – August 16, 2016) was an American television personality and political commentator. He created, produced, and hosted the political commentary series The McLaughlin Group from 1982 to 2016, and hosted and produced John McLaughlin's One on One, which ran from 1984 to 2013.

== Early life and education ==
John Joseph McLaughlin was born in Providence, Rhode Island on March 29, 1927, the son of Augustus Hugh McLaughlin and his wife Eva Philomena, née Turcotte. He grew up in a Catholic family whose parents were second-generation Irish-Americans. McLaughlin attended La Salle Academy in Providence, and at age 18, he entered Weston College in Weston, Massachusetts (which would later become Boston College's seminary), training to become a Catholic priest.

He entered the Jesuit order in 1947, aged 20, was ordained as a priest in 1959, and went on to earn two master's degrees (in philosophy and in English literature) from Boston College. After his ordination, McLaughlin spent some years as a high school teacher at Fairfield College Preparatory School, a Jesuit prep school in Connecticut. He took time off from teaching to earn a Ph.D. in philosophy from Columbia University, his thesis being written on the Catholic poet Gerard Manley Hopkins.

== Career ==
=== Early positions ===
He then became a writer and later assistant editor for the Jesuit current affairs publication, America, in New York City. Disagreements with the editor of the magazine led to his departure in 1970, after which he moved back to Providence.

=== Political positions ===
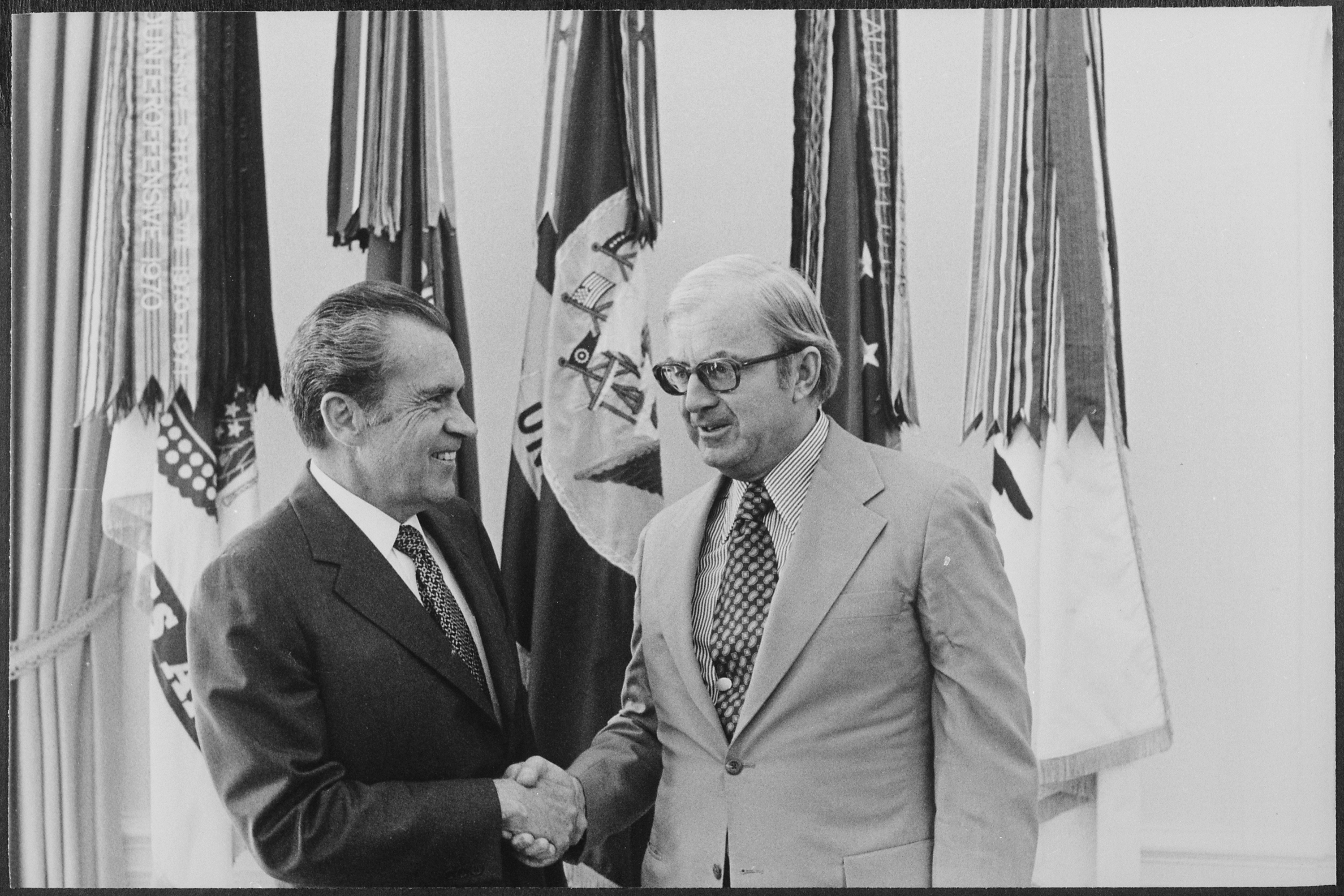
McLaughlin with Richard Nixon on May 3, 1974.

McLaughlin was originally a Democrat, but changed his party affiliation to Republican and opposed the Vietnam War, in particular, in a 1970 Republican run for the office of U.S. Senator from Rhode Island, where he called for the war's rapid end. McLaughlin was "in frequent conflict with his [Jesuit] superiors, who disapproved of his 1970 run", an event used by Elizabeth Jensen to characterise his style as "[c]ombative... from the beginning". (They had given permission to Robert Drinan, a fellow Jesuit and an antiwar Democrat, who ran that year for a Massachusetts seat in the U.S. House, and successfully). McLaughlin, "chastised by the bishop of Providence", ran regardless, and lost "by a wide margin" to the incumbent, Senator John O. Pastore.

Despite the loss, McLaughlin would make the move to the nation's capital in 1971, joining U.S. President Richard Nixon's staff as a speechwriter, and special assistant to the president, positions arising after Pat Buchanan, then a White House speechwriter, felt affinity for McLaughlin's views about the "leanings of the country’s 'broadcasting hierarchy'". In those roles, he was given the nickname of "Nixon’s Priest", and identified as an ardent war supporter, apart from his speechwriting duties, giving "frequent speeches in defense of the president’s conduct of the Vietnam War". According to one source, McLaughlin’s position in the White House was abolished at the start of President Gerald Ford's administration; according to another, he spent a further two months working under President Ford, when Vice President Ford succeeded Nixon after the latter's resignation in August 1974. McLaughlin would petition Pope Paul VI to be relieved of his obligations as a priest (i.e., for "laicization"), and leave the Catholic priesthood to marry, in 1975.

=== Media career ===
On leaving the White House, McLaughlin and Ann Dore founded a "public affairs and media relations consulting firm", he became Washington editor and a columnist for the National Review magazine (a role he would continue into the early The McLaughlin Group era), and he broke into radio in 1980 as a talk show and call-in host on WRC-AM (in Washington, D.C.). His Washington Post obituary states that he was fired "a year into [that last] gig, 'reportedly for talking too much and taking too few calls'".

Beginning in 1982, McLaughlin began hosting a newly conceived television program, The McLaughlin Group, on WRC-TV, a station that operated alongside his earlier AM radio employer, and this "political chat show... [was] unrecognizable" by standards at that time. The television show brought together four political commentators, usually two conservatives and two liberals, with McLaughlin seated in the middle. McLaughlin was known for his loud and forceful style of presentation, usually stating his opinion in an apodictic manner, and often cutting off other panelists by declaring their opinion "Wrong!", or putting a question to the panel, listening to other opinions, before finally giving his opinion as "the correct answer". Discussions in the McLaughlin Group tended to run until the very last few seconds of airtime, when McLaughlin would rather abruptly end each episode by saying "Bye-bye!".

McLaughlin also hosted the interview show John McLaughlin's One on One, first telecast in 1984, and ended in 2013. Also from 1989 through 1994, he produced and hosted McLaughlin, a one-hour nightly talk show on CNBC. For a short while in 1999, he hosted an MSNBC show, McLaughlin Special Report. The show was announced on January 22, and its cancellation was announced on February 25. A revival of The McLaughlin Group ran briefly in 2018, retaining McLaughlin's name in the show's title (despite his death, see following).

== Personal life ==
McLaughlin was routinely described during his life as "a former Jesuit priest"; after having trained and spent some years as a Jesuit priest, he left the Catholic priesthood in 1975.

McLaughlin married Ann Dore (née Lauenstein) on August 23, 1975, his former campaign manager and a former United States Secretary of Labor under President Ronald Reagan (1987-1989). McLaughlin and Dore divorced in 1992. McLaughlin married his second wife, Cristina Clara Vidal (vice president for operations of Oliver Productions) on June 22, 1997. The marriage ended in divorce in 2010.

In August 1989, a former executive assistant at McLaughlin's Oliver Productions, Linda D. Dean, at the time, 36-years old, was plaintiff in a lawsuit asking $4 million in penalties, accusing McLaughlin and Oliver productions of "sexual harassment and discrimination"; despite denying the suit's claims, McLaughlin and Oliver Productions settled the suit out-of-court, and in a December 1989 report on the settlement, neither plaintiff nor defendants offered comment.

Oliver Productions was named after McLaughlin's pet dog—a Basset Hound—which was portrayed in an animation of the brand logo at the close of each show. Oliver shared their Watergate apartment during McLaughlin's tenure as speechwriter for President Nixon. During 2014 year-end awards episode, McLaughlin ended the show saying: "Person of the year: Pope Francis, especially now that he's told that animals can go to heaven. And Oliver is up there waiting for me."

McLaughlin died of prostate cancer at the age of 89, at his home in Washington, D.C., on August 16, 2016, having missed his first broadcast in 34 years. McLaughlin's last message to fans was August 13, when he explained he had missed recent tapings due to his poor health.

== In popular culture ==
Dana Carvey of Saturday Night Live "memorably parodied... McLaughlin’s bombastic style", playing him as a character in skits in the early 1990s. McLaughlin enjoyed SNL's recurring McLaughlin Group sketches, even making a 1991 cameo appearance as the Grim Reaper in one of them.

McLaughlin also appeared in several films, including Dave, Mission: Impossible, Independence Day, and War, Inc., generally portraying himself discussing a political character in the movie. In the 2009 movie Watchmen, he is portrayed by Gary Houston in an early scene interviewing Pat Buchanan (played by James M. Connor) and Eleanor Clift (played by Mary Ann Burger) about the possibility of nuclear war with the Soviet Union. McLaughlin also hosted a special celebration for the 200th episode of the NBC sitcom Cheers.

Party political offices
Preceded by Ronald R. Lagueux	Republican nominee for U.S. Senator from Rhode Island (Class 1); 1970	Succeeded by John Chafee
