= John McLaughlin's One on One =

John McLaughlin's One on One is a weekly TV interview show that aired on American public broadcaster PBS. It was hosted by John McLaughlin, also the host of The McLaughlin Group. The show first aired in 1984 and produced its final program on May 24, 2013 after 29 years on the air.

The show was originally produced at WRC-TV in Washington, D.C., as a sister/spin-off to The McLaughlin Group. During the 1990s, the program was sponsored by the Archer-Daniels-Midland Company and Metropolitan Life Company.
