= America's Car Show =

American radio and television program

America's Car Show was a weekly American call-in radio program and a magazine format television program focusing on cars and the automotive industry. Callers call into the radio program with their difficult car problems, and host Tom Torbjornsen attempted to lead callers through diagnosis and gives suggestions on how to repair their vehicles. Torbjornsen frequently emphasized that automotive technology has progressed rapidly, and because most cars now have built-in computer diagnostic systems, he warned his listeners to not use "do it yourself" remedies and instead have the car taken to a professional, using the advice and diagnosis from his answer to the caller's question as a starting point.

The show also has interviews with guests in the automotive and related industries. Examples of previous guests in related industries include car sound systems, radar detectors, GPS, electronics, and biodiesel.

Torbjornsen (born July 3, 1956 in Brooklyn) was married twice; he had no children but did have two stepchildren from his second marriage. He died unexpectedly September 16, 2016.

== History ==
America's Car Show was based in Buffalo, New York and changed flagship stations frequently during its time on air. For many years, WBEN was the station's flagship. In 2004, however, WBUF went to a hot talk format and convinced Torbjornsen to join WBUF. Six months later, WBUF dumped the talk format and the show was displaced to WECK. Dissatisfied with being placed on an adult standards station, Torbjornsen left CBS Radio's cluster and joined WHLD, which had adopted a progressive talk radio format. This, however, was also short-lived, as when WHLD ran out of money, the talk format was dropped and the show was once again without a flagship. Eventually, the flagship became WWKB. The program also aired on America Right on XM Radio Saturday afternoons.

In July 2008, Tom Torbjornsen and Syndicated Solutions, the show's distributor, went their separate ways. It was an amicable separation according to Tom, and he planned to pursue other fields of work. Tom changed his mind when XM Radio contacted him stating they wanted him to continue the show just for America Right on XM. Tom agreed, and from July 2008 to January 2009, America's Car Show was exclusively heard every Sunday night on America Right XM 166.

On January 18, 2009, America's Car Show was moved from its long-time satellite home of America Right, over to Sirius XM Stars Too. Unlike America Right, Stars Too is available to all subscribers on both XM Radio channel 139, and Sirius Radio channel 108, as well as their Canadian platforms, and the online streaming services. The move more than doubled the potential audience of the show to over 20,000,000 subscribers.

Torbjornsen also wrote a weekly column (entitled "Tom's Corner") covering similar topics to the radio show; he also hosts two weekly segments on WIVB-TV. He resided in Chautauqua County for most of his adult life.

A longer-form television version of the series launched in September 2012 on WBBZ-TV. As of 2014, the show is no longer listed among WBBZ's offerings.
