= The McLaughlin Group =

Public affairs television program

- Title card for The McLaughlin Group introduced in September 2019
- Genre: Public affairs News analysis
- Created by: John McLaughlin
- Presented by: John McLaughlin (1982–2016); Tom Rogan (2018–2020)
- Starring: Pat Buchanan; Eleanor Clift; Clarence Page
- Country of origin: United States

Production
- Production locations: Washington, D.C.: WRC-TV studios (1982-2008); WUSA Broadcast House (2008–2016); WJLA studios (2018)
- Camera setup: multi-cam
- Running time: 30 minutes
- Production companies: Oliver Productions, Inc. WTTW Chicago

Original release
- Network: Broadcast syndication, primarily to public television
- Release: January 1, 1982 – August 19, 2016
- Release: January 7 – December 30, 2018
- Release: September 6, 2019 – December 25, 2020

The McLaughlin Group is a syndicated half-hour weekly public affairs talk show television program in the United States, hosted by John McLaughlin from 1982 until his death in 2016. Prompted by the host, the group of four pundits discussed current political issues in a round table format. A revival reuniting the regular panelists aired intermittently between 2018 and 2020.

== Format ==
The general format for the show consisted of moderator John McLaughlin questioning four commentators, among them Pat Buchanan, Eleanor Clift, Clarence Page, Morton Kondracke, Fred Barnes, Jack Germond and Mort Zuckerman. Members of the regular panel varied over the years.

A typical episode covered three or four issues. The first was introduced by McLaughlin, beginning with, "Issue one..." which was explained by him, usually in a prerecorded video segment accompanied by his voice-over. He then proposed a question for the panelists, starting with Buchanan (if present). The conversation was usually sedate at the beginning of the program, but as opposing viewpoints emerged there was more verbal rough-housing, good-natured gamesmanship and occasionally very loud crosstalk as panelists attempted to out-yell the others, all of which were the show's trademarks.

Two episodes at the turn of the calendar year were reserved for "The McLaughlin Group Year-End Awards". Each panelist announced his or her choice for each category such as “Biggest Winner of 2008,” ”Best Politician,” “Most Boring,” “Turncoat of the Year,” “Enough Already,” “Most Underrated,” etc., followed by McLaughlin's choice. During the first of these special episodes, the participants typically dressed in festive Christmas attire; in the second, they typically dressed in formal evening wear for the New Year.

On March 11, 2011, The McLaughlin Group began broadcasting in high definition, with broadcasts presented in letterboxed and pillarboxed format for viewers with standard-definition television sets watching either through cable or satellite television. The program remained the set, while upconverted its existing graphics package to HD.

== Criticism ==
Journalists James Fallows and ex-McLaughlin Group panelist Jack Germond opined that the show gloried too much in sensationalism and simplification, to the detriment of serious journalism. Ronald Reagan, while in office as U.S. president, once referred to McLaughlin and his group as taking the traditional Sunday morning talk show format of a moderator with a group of journalists and turning it into "a political version of Animal House."

Despite the president's remark, Christopher Hitchens wrote in 1987 that The McLaughlin Group was firmly aligned with the Reagan administration. Not only did it accept all sorts of preconditions for access to official guests (servitude Hitchens attributed to all major political talk shows of the time), it actively assisted the White House – McLaughlin's wife Ann served in the cabinet, and Pat Buchanan was "hired straight off the set" to be Reagan's director of communications. As for McLaughlin himself, Hitchens said, "he likes to canvass all opinions from the extreme right to the moderate right".

== Syndication ==
The original incarnation aired on PBS member TV stations and the PBS digital subchannel World as well as on some local commercial TV stations, including WCBS-TV in New York City. During its run, underwriters included Pfizer, the New York Stock Exchange, and GE (the longest-serving, which spent 16 years).

The show was distributed by Chicago-based PBS member station WTTW. In the United States, it was carried on numerous public broadcasting stations and, from May 2007 to August 2016, a small number of CBS-affiliated stations. Most stations carried the program on weekends, but there were a few, like WGBH in Boston, Kentucky Educational Television stations across Kentucky, Mississippi ETV in Jackson, Mississippi, PBS channel 8 KUHT in Houston, Texas, WGVU Channel 35/WGVK Channel 52 Grand Rapids/Kalamazoo, Michigan, and PBS channel 28 KBTC in Tacoma, Washington, that ran it on Friday evenings, and WHUT-TV Channel 32 in Washington, D.C., aired it on Tuesdays. Internationally, the show was carried on several satellite channels, such as Voice of America TV and it was on the London-based CNBC Europe. It was also carried by CTV in Christchurch, New Zealand, and by Triangle TV in Auckland, New Zealand.

From its start until May 2008, the program originated from WRC-TV, the NBC-owned station in Washington, D.C. From May 2008 until it ended in August 2016, the show was produced at and aired by WUSA-TV, the Tegna-owned CBS affiliate for Washington, D.C.

== Final episode ==
In the final months of the show's run, McLaughlin took a smaller role in the panel's weekly discussions due to health issues and a wavering voice. The McLaughlin Group recorded its last episode on August 12, 2016 without him on camera. It was the only episode he missed in the original run's 34-year history, although his voice introduced the week's issues via pre-recorded voiceovers. The episode began with a written statement from McLaughlin, which read:

Dear Friends of The McLaughlin Group, Dr. McLaughlin here. As the panel′s recent absences attest, I am under the weather. The final issue of this episode has my voice, but please forgive me for its weaker than usual quality. Yet my spirit is strong and my dedication to this show remains absolute!

Panelist Pat Buchanan then began the episode by saying, "This is our first time in 34 years that our distinguished leader Dr. McLaughlin is not in his chair and we miss him. But let's get on with the show." Buchanan, Eleanor Clift, Clarence Page, and Tom Rogan recorded the show without a moderator. Rogan closed the episode by saying, "On behalf of the panel, we want to say to John that we're thinking of you and you have our very best."

Four days after the recording of the last episode, John McLaughlin died at the age of 89 on August 16, 2016. On August 18, 2016, WTTW's chief content officer Dan Soles announced that The McLaughlin Group had ended production. He told The Hollywood Reporter in a statement, "This long-running political commentary and discussion show was consistently an audience favorite, and we will miss this important contribution to our political coverage. WTTW is proud to have brought the series, and Dr. McLaughlin, to the PBS system."

== Revival ==
The program was revived January 7, 2018 – retaining McLaughlin's name posthumously – reuniting the same panelists from the later years of the original run, joined by Tom Rogan as host.

Airing on WJLA-TV in Washington, D.C. during its first few months, and then available only online through December 30, 2018. The revival went into hiatus from January 4, 2019 through August 30, 2019, but returned to the air on Maryland Public Television on September 6, 2019. The show began airing nationally on PBS in the United States on January 3, 2020. It again went into hiatus after its broadcast of December 25, 2020.

=== WJLA-TV ===
In a chance meeting with Eleanor Clift in March 2017, BL Media Group chief executive officer Seth Berenzweig proposed a revival of The McLaughlin Group. Although Clift initially opposed the idea, arguing that the show could not go on without McLaughlin as host, she became more positive about the proposal after meeting with Berenzweig, Clarence Page, Pat Buchanan, McLaughlin Group producer and director Shelly Schwartz, and BL Media Group president Tod Castleberry. They decided to offer Tom Rogan the position of host of the revived show, and he accepted.

On August 12, 2017, a pilot episode for a revived The McLaughlin Group appeared on YouTube. The panelists were Buchanan, Clift, Page, and former Central Intelligence Agency officer and 2016 presidential candidate Evan McMullin. Rogan served as the host of the program. According to Buchanan's official website, the panelists were hoping to sell the revived show to a network so that The McLaughlin Group could be "back on the air on a full-time basis."

Berenzweig and Castleberry believed that a revived McLaughlin Group could not survive commercially as merely a regional show in the Washington, D.C., area and needed national distribution to be financially viable. At the time the pilot appeared on YouTube, Sinclair Broadcast Group was trying to acquire Tribune Media, and Berenzweig and Castleberry approached WJLA-TV, the Sinclair-owned ABC affiliate in Washington, D.C., about a deal to carry the revived show locally. Based on the YouTube pilot, BL Media Group and WJLA-TV agreed to a deal, with the expectation that the merger of Sinclair and Tribune would go through as expected and lead to national distribution of The McLaughlin Group not long after its WJLA-TV debut. On December 22, 2017, it was announced that the program would return in 2018 with Rogan as host and longtime panelists Buchanan, Clift, and Page also set to return. The new version of The McLaughlin Group premiered on January 7, 2018, airing only on WJLA-TV. It was broadcast on Sundays at noon Eastern Time, with its episodes also available online. Sinclair Broadcasting expressed hopes to syndicate the show during the 2018–19 television season, most likely in a news block also featuring Full Measure with Sharyl Attkisson.

The proposed Sinclair-Tribune merger came under scrutiny by the Federal Communications Commission, and within three months Tribune Media decided to pull out of the potential deal. Without the merger, there was no chance of national distribution of The McLaughlin Group via Sinclair alone, so BL Media Group opted not to renew its contract with WJLA-TV and parted company amicably with the station. As a result, after a few months, The McLaughlin Group ceased to air on WJLA-TV and became available online only. After it revived the original program's two-part end-of-year annual "awards" show in its episodes of December 23 and 30, 2018, the new show went into hiatus. With The McLaughlin Group having no prospect of national distribution at the time, BL Media Group believed that it was unlikely to survive.

=== Maryland Public Television ===
From January 4, 2019 to August 30, 2019, The McLaughlin Group's web site featured a banner that said: "Exciting news coming soon for McLaughlin Group fans! We are taking a brief hiatus on-air and will have a major announcement coming soon. 'The American Original' for over three decades, the sharpest minds, best sources and hardest talk will be bigger and better in 2019. Thanks for your support and stay tuned right here and on our social media for the latest." Meanwhile, BL Media Group decided that public television offered the best chance of resurrecting the revived show and approached several PBS stations during 2019 about carrying it. Ultimately, they chose Maryland Public Television (MPT) because of MPT's mutual familiarity with BL Media Group, proximity to Washington, D.C., and willingness to promote The McLauglin Group as a marquee show.

In August 2019, a redesigned version of the web site announced that the show would return to the air on MPT and would premiere there on September 6, 2019, again moderated by Rogan and with Buchanan, Clift, and Page returning as regular panelists. A redesigned opening title sequence in high definition (the previous opening was letterboxed), featuring a caricature drawing of McLaughlin before the new logo, was added.

On August 12, 2019, MPT and The McLaughlin Group's production company, Re-Group Media, LLC, announced an agreement under which the show was recorded on Fridays at a studio in Washington, D.C., and aired on MPT on Fridays at 11:30 p.m. Eastern Time and again on Saturdays at 11:00 a.m. Eastern Time; the most recent episode became available online at 12:00 noon Eastern Time on Sunday. Telecasts began on September 6, 2019, with a new logo and set but otherwise retaining the format of the 2018 revival. MPT produced, marketed, promoted, and distributed the program nationally through an agreement with American Public Television, with plans to begin national distribution in January 2020. On January 3, 2020, the program began to air nationally in the United States, exclusively on PBS stations and digital platforms.

The McLaughlin Group also produced a "Web Exclusive" each week. Available on the show's web site, each "Web Exclusive" was a continuation of that week's episode in which the panelists discuss an additional topic using footage not included in the broadcast. The first "Web Exclusive" was recorded as a continuation of the television episode of November 1, 2019.

On November 1, 2019, Westwood One began to produce the show for its podcast network. During the weekend of December 7–8, 2019, the show premiered around the United States on the Westwood One radio network.

By early March 2020, The McLaughlin Group aired on 204 television stations around the United States, reaching 60 percent of the American population, including outlets in 14 of the top 25 U.S. television markets, among them Chicago, Dallas, Los Angeles, New York City, San Francisco, and Washington, D.C. At the time, an expanded one-hour version of the show aired on 40 radio stations around the United States through Westwood One, in addition to the Westwood One-produced podcast version of the show.

In the revived McLaughlin Group, the panel sought a calmer tone from that fostered by McLaughlin during his years as host, adopting a more conversational style with less shouting and crosstalk and no demands by the host for one-word answers to questions. As host, Rogan also took on a different persona and approach from McLaughlin, weaving his opinions into conversations rather than barking them out at panelists. Reflecting this new tone, the revived show adopted the slogan "Where friends disagree, agreeably."

When public health restrictions to address the COVID-19 pandemic became widespread and commonplace in the United States in March 2020, The McLaughlin Group stopped taping episodes in a studio and moved to a format in which members of the panel participated remotely. This format continued through the broadcast of December 25, 2020.

After the two-part annual end-of-year "awards" show was broadcast in the episodes of December 18 and 25, 2020, The McLaughlin Group again ceased to air on television or post episodes or "Web Exclusives" on its Web site. On January 8, 2021, the show's Twitter feed posted a message that stated "As we kick-off the new year, The McLaughlin Group and its producers would like to thank all of our loyal viewers and listeners. We are taking a brief hiatus as we work with our broadcast partners to continue to bring to you this landmark and vital show during this important time in our country." An identical message appeared on the show's Web page, from which all other content disappeared. During the second half of June 2022, the Web page disappeared, and as of July 1, 2022, both the show's website and Facebook page are permanently offline.

== Panelists ==
Regular panelists, revival and original

- Pat Buchanan: political commentator and author
- Eleanor Clift: contributor, MSNBC and The Daily Beast
- Clarence Page: columnist, The Chicago Tribune

Original series regular panelists

- Paul Glastris: editor, Washington Monthly
- Mort Zuckerman: owner, New York Daily News and U.S. News & World Report
- David Rennie: columnist, The Economist

Original series recurring panelists

- Fred Barnes
- Michael Barone
- Tony Blankley
- Jay Carney
- Monica Crowley
- Susan Ferrechio
- Jack Germond
- Al Hunt
- Katty Kay
- Michael Kinsley
- Morton Kondracke
- Lawrence Kudlow
- Rich Lowry
- Chris Matthews
- Laura Ingraham
- Robert Novak
- Tucker Carlson
- Lawrence O'Donnell
- Tom Rogan
- Mark Shields
- Chrystia Freeland

== In popular culture ==
McLaughlin's loud and forceful style of presentation was parodied by Dana Carvey on Saturday Night Live. McLaughlin made a cameo appearance on one of Carvey's parody sketches. The 2009 film Watchmen features a fictionalized version of the show.

== See also ==
- John McLaughlin's One on One
