= Ryan White HIV/AIDS Program =

Agency of the US Department of Health and Human Services

HIV/AIDS Bureau

Agency overview
- Agency executive: Laura Cheever, Associate Administrator
- Parent department: Health Resources and Services Administration
- Website: ryanwhite.hrsa.gov

The Ryan White HIV/AIDS Program, formally the HIV/AIDS Bureau, is a bureau of the U.S. Health Resources and Services Administration (HRSA) in the U.S. Department of Health and Human Services. It funds primary health care, support services and life-sustaining medications for about half of the estimated 1.1 million people living with HIV/AIDS in the United States, as the U.S. government's social response to the HIV/AIDS epidemic of the late 20th century, with a budget of more than $2.1 billion (FY 2008).

The Ryan White HIV/AIDS Program was established in 1990 by the Ryan White CARE Act, named after AIDS activist Ryan White. It was administratively spun off as a separate bureau in 1997.

== Programs ==
The Ryan White HIV/AIDS Program provides primary medical care—including dentistry—and support services to individuals living with the disease who lack health insurance or personal financial resources to pay for their own care. For most, it is the "program of last resort", covering those who do not qualify for any other health benefits program, including Medicare or Medicaid.

While clinical care and support services are the primary focus of the program, Ryan White also funds training and technical assistance for medical professionals as well as demonstration projects aimed at identifying and slowing the epidemic in high-risk populations. At present, young males of color are at greatest risk. But HIV/AIDS is also increasing among women: in 1985 women made up only 8% of total cases; by 2006 that number had increased to 23%.

HRSA-funded services are intended to reduce the use of costly inpatient care, extend screening and treatment into medically underserved populations, and improve the quality of life for those affected by the epidemic. The program achieves these goals by funding HIV/AIDS care and services through grants to state and local governments, health care providers and community-based organizations.

Almost three-quarters of Ryan White patients are minorities, who have higher rates of HIV infection and are more likely to reside in areas with a shortage of health professionals, screening facilities and treatment centers. Providing HIV-testing, early diagnosis and ongoing care is made more difficult by the relative scarcity of health services in these communities, as well as social attitudes related to the disease and means of transmission.

=== Funding for metropolitan areas ===
Through Part A of the program, HRSA provides funding to Eligible Metropolitan Areas and Transitional Grant Areas (those hardest hit by the HIV/AIDS epidemic) for a wide range of community-based efforts, such as outpatient health care and case management.

=== Funding to states ===
Through Part B, HRSA provides formula funding to states and territories to strengthen the quality, availability, and organizational structures of their delivery networks. This funding includes the AIDS Drug Assistance Program (ADAP), which supports the provision of prescription medications. About a third of the Ryan White budget is spent on ADAP.

The AIDS Drug Assistance Program (ADAP) is the fastest growing grant component in Ryan White. First funded in FY 1996 at $52 million, state-run ADAPs today receive $808.5 million to provide antiretroviral medications to patients who cannot afford them. On average, more than 158,000 clients receive their prescriptions annually through ADAP.

=== Funding to communities ===
Through Part C, HRSA grants support public and private non-profit providers (such as community and migrant health centers, faith-based organizations, hospitals and university medical centers, and city and county health departments) for outpatient early-intervention services and capacity-building.

As an example of what is possible, in 1989 Pernessa C. Seele worked with major religious leaders, such as Dr. Frederick B. Williams and Dr. Wyatt Tee Walker and their congregations in Harlem, New York, to create the first Harlem Week of Prayer for Healing of AIDS. She doubled the number of congregations the next year, and incorporated as "The Balm in Gilead, Inc." The non-profit now provides educational and technical assistance as a center for public health through faith communities, with some funding from the US Centers for Disease Control in Atlanta. Beginning with organizing congregations in prayers, Seele and her staff work with them to provide education and work to prevent HIV/AIDS, as well as to provide faith community support to patients and families. They have involved 10,000 congregations across the United States, as well as establishing model programs in the Caribbean and some nations in Africa.

=== Funding for women, children and families ===
Through Part D, HRSA funds public agencies and private non-profits to build community- and faith-based programs for children, youth, women and families. Part D also provides for a Youth Services Initiative to identify HIV-infected adolescents; bring them into comprehensive, culturally and linguistically sensitive care; and retain them in treatment.

Part F includes the Special Projects of National Significance Program, which provides funding to public and private nonprofit entities to develop innovative models of HIV care for underserved populations. Part F also includes the Dental Reimbursement Program, the Community-Based Dental Partnership Program and the AIDS Education and Training Centers.

== History ==
The original Ryan White Program was enacted in 1990 to improve the quality and availability of care for people with HIV/AIDS and their families. It was reauthorized in 1996, 2000 and 2006. Another reauthorization was due in 2009.

The HIV/AIDS Bureau was created in 1997, consolidating functions that had previously been dispersed among four other bureaus of HRSA.

The bureau currently operates under the Ryan White HIV/AIDS Treatment Modernization Act of 2006, which directs that more funds be spent on "core services" (medical, dental and prescription assistance), rather than such support functions as housing and transportation. The new law also allows the U.S. Secretary of Health and Human Services greater flexibility in reallocating funds to respond to changes in the course of the epidemic.

In March 2026, during the second presidency of Donald Trump, the Department of Health and Human Services (HHS) imposed conditions on funding from the Ryan White Program that barred acknowledgement of transgender identity and provision of gender-affirming care. These restrictions were adopted to comply with Trump's Executive Order 14168, which prohibited federal funding for "gender ideology". In June 2026, a group of medical associations and healthcare providers sued the Trump administration in the District Court of Massachusetts over these conditions. On November 19, 2026, judge William G. Young sided with the plaintiffs, ruling that the restrictions violated the first and fifth amendments and were "based in animus, loathing, and discrimination".
