= San Francisco AIDS Foundation =

American nonprofit organization

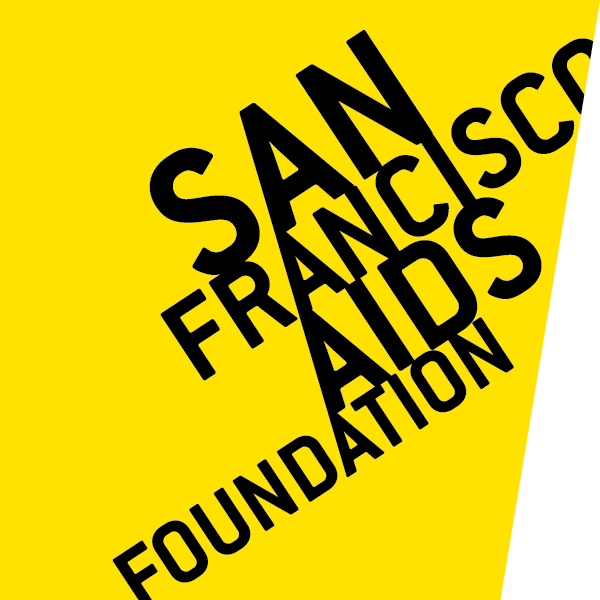
- Abbreviation: SFAF
- Formation: April 1982; 44 years ago
- Founder: Cleve Jones; Marcus Conant; Frank Jacobson; Richard Keller
- Type: Nonprofit
- Services: Advice and assistance for people with HIV/AIDS
- CEO: Tyler TerMeer, PhD
- Website: sfaf.org

The San Francisco AIDS Foundation (SFAF) is a nonprofit organization dedicated to providing services for people with HIV/AIDS, with a mission to end the AIDS epidemic in the United States. They were founded in 1982, at the beginning of the AIDS epidemic. SFAF is one of the largest and oldest community-based AIDS service organizations in the United States. SFAF's ratings at Charity Navigator are mixed. While it has an 87.67% overall rating and a 97% accountability & transparency rating, its leadership rating is only 50%, and it has not provided sufficient information to be rated on impact and measurement, program planning, culture and compensation, or workplace policies.

== History ==
The SFAF was established in April 1982 as the Kaposi's Sarcoma Research and Education Foundation, by Cleve Jones, Marcus Conant, Frank Jacobson, and Richard Keller. They reorganized as the San Francisco AIDS Foundation in 1984.

The SFAF was originally an all volunteer group led by physicians and gay community leaders. It began by providing a hotline service originally called the Kaposi Sarcoma or KS hotline that was later renamed along with the organization. The Hotline was intended to serve as a source of accurate information about the AIDS epidemic. It was initially available in Northern California but the organization's growth would see it expand nationwide. By 1995, the SFAF reported receiving more than 10,000 calls every month on their Northern California AIDS Hotline.

By October 1982 the foundation officially began working with the San Francisco Department of Public Health. Through collaboration the SFAF was able to provide public services meant to educate people about AIDS. By November the foundation was working with the California Department of Health Services to provide the same services to other areas of California. By 1983 the foundation had reached the point where they could establish a social services department that could offer emergency services to those affected by AIDS and related issues. Additionally, a major part of the SFAF mission was getting condoms in the hands of gay men. Due to the heavily heterosexual advertising and a lack of scientific support, many gay men did not view condoms as useful for their sexual health. In 1987, one of the advertising designers for SFAF, Les Pappas, urged condom companies and public health officials to include gay men in their target audience. Pappas believed that eroticizing condoms and their role in preventing sexually transmitted diseases would change attitudes towards their use. As a result, the SFAF conducted a large advertising campaign, placing messages on public transportation, popular newspapers, and strategically placed advertisements in venues and media popular with the gay community, like gay bars and bathhouses. Additionally, SFAF regularly spoke at public conventions and campaigned to the healthcare fields and government. The foundation also worked with journalists to increase awareness and understanding of the epidemic. The media produced by the SFAF focused on risk reduction and safe sex. In particular the Foundation emphasized the use of condoms during anal intercourse for gay men, and cautioned against activities that shared bodily fluids. While this advertising saw success, SFAF consistently struggled to reach non-white communities.

Today the SFAF continues its mission in combating AIDS and to eventually end the disease, and has grown large enough be a respected source of information on AIDS as well as support other organizations and programs aside from its advertising efforts. Among the services offered, the SFAF offers sexual health services including a pre-exposure program. Participants in the program are assisted in obtaining medication easily. The SFAF also runs services designed to help with substance abuse such as the Stonewall Project and social support programs aimed at the homeless and people over fifty. In addition the SFAF is a major influence and collaborator on the Getting to Zero initiative.

SFAF has received part of its funding from the annual AIDS Walk SF, which has raised over $80 million for SFAF since the first AIDS Walk in 1987.

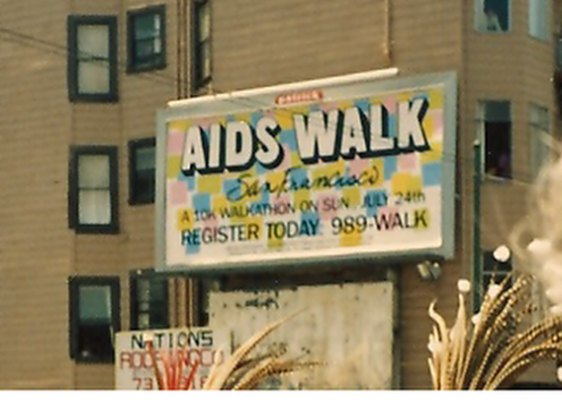
billboard for San Francisco Aids walk 1988

SFAF additionally funds other local and international HIV/AIDS organizations with proceeds from the walk. AIDS Walk SF severed ties with SFAF after the 2013 walk. SFAF advocates for reducing stigma associated with HIV/AIDS and treatments for it. Congressperson Nancy Pelosi gave tribute to SFAF in October 2004, praising then-executive director Pat Christen.

In 2011 SFAF took over the Stop AIDS Project.

In 2016 SFAF opened Strut, a sexual health clinic at 470 Castro Street in the Castro District in San Francisco.

The 50-Plus Network, developed by Jeff Leiphart, PhD, and Noah Briones, MFT, and currently managed by Vince Crisostomo, offers a growing number of opportunities for older gay men in the San Francisco area to improve health and well-being, connect with peers, and give back to their community.

In February 2025, SFAF became the lead plaintiff in the lawsuit San Francisco AIDS Foundation v. Trump, filed by Lambda Legal. The suit challenges three executive orders issued by Donald Trump, titled "Ending Radical And Wasteful Government DEI Programs And Preferencing" (EO 14151), "Defending Women from Gender Ideology Extremism and Restoring Biological Truth to the Federal Government" (EO 14168), and "Ending Illegal Discrimination And Restoring Merit-Based Opportunity" (EO 14173).

== Publications ==
- How AIDS Ends: An Anthology from San Francisco AIDS Foundation, Timothy Ray Brown, Jeanne White Ginder and Cleve Jones, foreword by Bill Clinton. (2012) ISBN 978-0-615-73068-4

== See also ==
- Hank M. Tavera
