= Seele =

Seele may refer to:

== People ==
- Gertrud Seele (1917–1945), German nurse and social worker executed by the Nazis for helping Jews
- Pernessa C. Seele (born 1954), American immunologist and interfaith public health activist
- Thomas Seele (1611–1675), Irish Anglican priest, 11th Provost of Trinity College Dublin and Dean of St Patrick's Cathedral
- Troy Seele, former guitarist of the American heavy metal band Iced Earth
- Herr Seele, pseudonym of Flemish cartoonist Peter Van Heirseele (born 1959)

== Other uses ==
- Željne, Slovenia, a village spelled Seele in German
- Seele GmbH, German engineering and construction company
- Die Seele (English: The Soul), a 1914 book by German philosopher and psychologist Joseph Geyser
- SEELE, a fictional organization led by Keel Lorentz in the anime Neon Genesis Evangelion
- Seele Vollerei, a playable character in Honkai Impact 3rd
- Seele, a playable character in Honkai: Star Rail based on the Honkai Impact 3rd character
