= San Francisco AIDS Foundation v. Trump =

Federal lawsuit filed on February 20, 2025

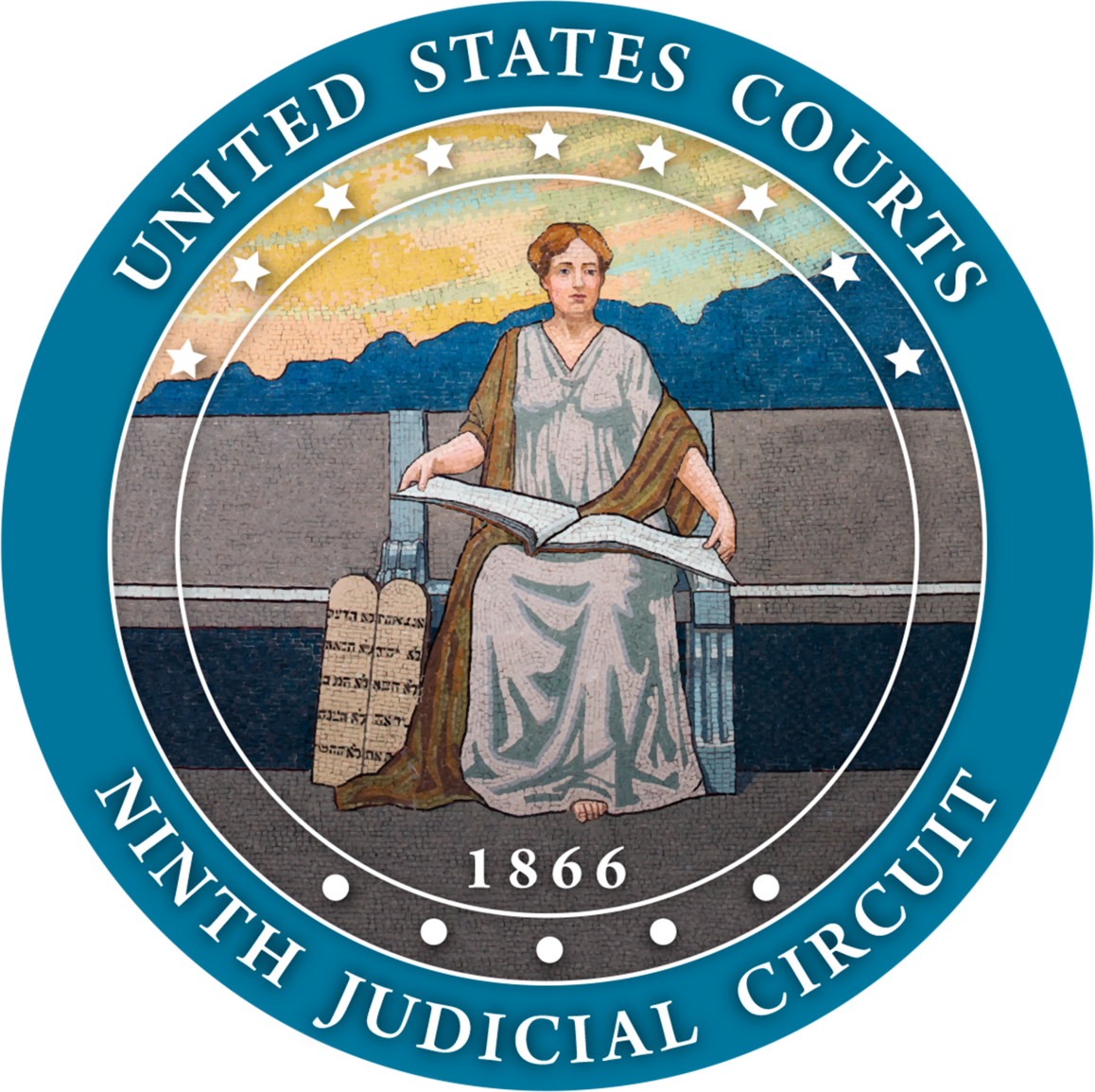
- Court: United States Court of Appeals for the Ninth Circuit
- Full case name: San Francisco AIDS Foundation, et al. v. Trump, et al.
- Started: August 7, 2025; 3 months ago
- Decided: Pending
- Defendants: Donald J. Trump Michael Schloss; National Archives and Records Administration; National Endowment for the Humanities; Office of Federal Contract Compliance Programs; Office of Management and Budget; Pamela Bondi; Robert F. Kennedy, Jr. Russell T. Vought; Scott Turner; Shelly C. Lowe; U. S. Department of Health and Human Services; U.S. Department of Housing and Urban Development; U.S. Department of Justice; U.S. Department of Labor; Vincent N. Micone William Bosanko
- Counsel for plaintiffs: Jose Abrigo; Camilla Taylor; Ken Upton; Omar Gonzalez-Pagan; Pelecanos; Karen Loewy
- Plaintiffs: San Francisco AIDS Foundation Los Angeles LGBT Center; GLBT Historical Society; San Francisco Community Health Center; Prisma Community Care; The NYC LGBT Community Center; Bradbury-Sullivan Community Center; Baltimore Safe Haven FORGE
- Citation: 25-4988

Case history
- Prior action: San Francisco A.I.D.S. Foundation v. Trump (4:25-cv-01824)
- Appealed from: United States District Court for the Northern District of California

San Francisco AIDS Foundation v. Trump is a lawsuit filed on February 20, 2025, in the United States District Court for the Northern District of California. In the lawsuit, the San Francisco AIDS Foundation and eight other nonprofit organizations challenge provisions in the executive orders of President Donald Trump. The district court issued a preliminary injunction in June 2025, which was appealed to the U.S. Court of Appeals for the Ninth Circuit by the Trump administration in August 2025.

== Background ==
The plaintiffs include the San Francisco AIDS Foundation and eight other nonprofit organizations that support LGBTQ and HIV-affected communities. They are represented by Lambda Legal. These organizations are:

- San Francisco AIDS Foundation (San Francisco)
- Los Angeles LGBT Center (Los Angeles)
- GLBT Historical Society (San Francisco)
- San Francisco Community Health Center (San Francisco)
- Prisma Community Care (Arizona)
- The NYC LGBT Community Center (New York City)
- Bradbury-Sullivan Community Center (Lehigh Valley, Pennsylvania)
- Baltimore Safe Haven (Baltimore)
- FORGE (Wisconsin)

The lawsuit names 17 defendants including Donald Trump.

The lawsuit challenges the executive orders titled "Ending Radical And Wasteful Government DEI Programs And Preferencing" (EO 14151), "Defending Women from Gender Ideology Extremism and Restoring Biological Truth to the Federal Government" (EO 14168), and "Ending Illegal Discrimination And Restoring Merit-Based Opportunity" (EO 14173). These orders, which were signed at the beginning of Trump's second presidency in January 2025, restrict federal grant funding for organizations based on their policies on DEI and gender identity.

== Legal proceedings ==
On May 22, 2025, Judge Jon S. Tigar heard arguments from the parties at the federal courthouse in Oakland, California. The plaintiffs requested a preliminary injunction to block the implementation of Trump's executive orders.

On June 9, 2025, judge Tigar granted the plaintiff's request to block enforcement of the grant funding requirements in Trump's executive orders, finding that these provisions "reflect an effort to censor constitutionally protected speech and services promoting DEI and recognizing the existence of transgender individuals". However, the judge did not block all of the provisions in the orders, and ruled that the plaintiffs lacked standing to challenge five of the nine provisions they contested in the lawsuit. The Trump administration filed an appeal with the U.S. Court of Appeals for the Ninth Circuit.

On July 15, 2025, Lambda Legal reported that $6.2 million in grant funding had been restored to the plaintiffs following judge Tigar's preliminary injunction. As of October 2025, the court case is ongoing.

On October 10, 2025, the attorneys general of 17 states, led by California, Illinois, and Massachusetts, filed an amicus brief, urging the appellate court to uphold district court judge Tigar's preliminary injunction. The following week, the office of the City Attorney of San Francisco announced that they had filed an amicus brief on behalf of 12 U.S. cities and counties, also urging the appellate court to uphold the district court's decision.

== See also ==
- 2020s anti-LGBTQ movement in the United States
- Diversity, equity, and inclusion policies of the second Trump administration
- Legal affairs of the second Donald Trump presidency
