= Executive Order 14168 =

2025 US executive order

- "Defending Women from Gender Ideology Extremism and Restoring Biological Truth to the Federal Government"
- Type: Executive order
- Number: 14168
- President: Donald Trump
- Signed: January 20, 2025

Federal Register details
- Federal Register document number: 2025-02090
- Publication date: January 30, 2025

Executive Order 14168, titled "Defending Women from Gender Ideology Extremism and Restoring Biological Truth to the Federal Government", is an executive order issued by Donald Trump, the 47th president of the United States, on January 20, 2025, the day of the inauguration of his second presidency.

Part of a broader targeting and persecution of transgender people in the United States, the order prohibits the federal government from recognizing the gender identity of transgender people. It requires the federal government to replace usages of "gender" with "sex", defining sex as an immutable male–female binary determined "at conception", and orders ceasing all funding for gender-affirming care and the promotion of "gender ideology", requiring the binary sex marker on the birth certificate printed closest to birth on all U.S. passports, and prohibiting transgender people from using sex-segregated spaces congruent with their gender in federally funded facilities. It also calls upon the attorney general to re-evaluate the application of Bostock v. Clayton County (2020) as to not provide Title VII protection based on gender identity in federal activities.

Provisions of the order have faced legal challenges, with temporary restraining orders having been issued to suspend the withholding of federal funding to programs that fund gender-affirming care and promote "gender ideology", the forced transfers of transgender inmates to facilities congruent with their sex assigned at birth, issuing all new U.S. passports in the bearer's assigned sex at birth (without regard to if they have completed sex reassignment surgery, have an amended birth certificate, or a legal sex change in their home state), and the mass removal of documents published by the Centers for Disease Control and Prevention, Food and Drug Administration, Department of Health and Human Services that mention topics related to "gender ideology".

== Background ==
On June 29, 2023, then-presidential candidate Donald Trump signed the "Presidential Promise to American Women" authored by the Concerned Women for America (CWA) Legislative Action Committee. According to Penny Young Nance, president of CWA, this was a "pledge to American women stating unequivocally there are only two genders, only women can be mothers and bear children, and as president, he will protect our safe spaces, our locker rooms, bathrooms, prisons, domestic violence shelters, health care, education, and, yes, ban biological men from competing in women's sports".

Trump signed the order on his first day as president, as well as more than 25 other executive orders. A Trump administration official said "this is step one" and that more restrictions on transgender people will follow. CWA considers Trump's Executive Order a fulfillment of his Presidential Promise.

=== Workplace protections for transgender persons ===
Title VII of the Civil Rights Act of 1964 outlaws discrimination on the basis of sex, among other things. Historically, there has been ambiguity regarding whether protection against discrimination on the basis of "sex" can be understood to also encompass gender identity. This question eventually "matriculated up to the Supreme Court" when, in the Bostock v. Clayton County case (2020), the Court held that protections outlined in the Civil Rights Act did indeed extend to gender identity.

A key concern regarding this executive order is that, by changing the definition and enforcement of the term "sex" in ways that "ignores decades of scientific evidence to the contrary", it may undermine the protections afforded by the Bostock case.

== Summary ==
The order attacks what it calls "gender ideology", described as replacing "the biological category of sex with an ever-shifting concept of self-assessed gender identity, permitting the false claim that males can identify as and thus become women and vice versa, and requiring all institutions of society to regard this false claim as true". The order stated that it would "defend women's rights and protect freedom of conscience by using clear and accurate language and policies that recognize women are biologically female, and men are biologically male".

The order additionally defines "female" and "male" as "a person belonging, at conception to the sex that produces the large reproductive cell" and a "person belonging, at conception, to the sex that produces the small reproductive cell" respectively.

The executive order mandated that:

- Federal agencies should use "sex" instead of "gender", remove materials that "promote gender ideology", and halt "funding of gender ideology"
- Official government documents such as passports and visas must display the bearer's binary assigned sex at birth, using the documentation and early public records printed closest to birth. Existing documents will not be affected unless they are renewed.
- Transgender people not be imprisoned in facilities congruent with their gender identity
- The Bureau of Prisons halt any federal funding for gender-affirming care and that the Prison Rape Elimination Act be amended and Americans with Disabilities Act be re-interpreted to do so.
- Federal funding no longer go to gender-affirming care.
- The attorney general provides guidance "to correct the misapplication of the Supreme Court's decision in Bostock v. Clayton County (2020) to sex-based distinctions" in federal agency activities.
- Prior policies and federal government documents that are inconsistent with this order be rescinded, including policies that require the use of names and pronouns consistent with a person's gender identity in federal workplaces.
  - For instance, EO 14168 rescinded the Biden-era EO 13988, which had previously mandated protections against discrimination based on gender identity and sexual orientation. (Note: The official text of the EO 14168 states: "The requirements of this order supersede conflicting provisions in any previous Executive Orders or Presidential Memoranda, including but not limited to Executive Orders 13988... These Executive Orders are hereby rescinded...")

== Analysis ==
The order defines a female as "a person belonging, at conception to the sex that produces the large reproductive cell", while a male is a "person belonging, at conception, to the sex that produces the small reproductive cell".

It is not possible to determine at conception which reproductive cells an embryo will eventually create as it takes eight to 10 weeks for genetic signals to stimulate the development of non-neutral gonads (i.e. testes or ovaries).

Intersex people were not included in the executive order. According to activist Alicia Roth Weigel, this order "attempts to negate our very existence".

Some (including Sarah McBride, the first transgender member of Congress) have speculated that the order may be interpreted as defining everyone as female since male genes are not expressed until 6–8 weeks after conception. This was called false by Snopes, referring to recent research that shows that it is incorrect to say that all embryos start as female. Instead, the Snopes analysis points out that since the executive order does not define what "belonging [...] to" means in terms of determining a person's sex, the order could be interpreted as either all persons belong to no sex, or alternatively, all persons belong to both sexes. In early development, human embryos develop both early-stage female reproductive tracts (i.e., Müllerian ducts) and early-stage male reproductive tracts (i.e., Wolffian ducts). It is only later in development that the expression of male or female genes normally causes one or the other of these tracts to further develop into male or female reproductive tracts, and the other to be absorbed.

Writing for The New York Times, Masha Gessen argued that the restrictions of this order, along with those implemented as part of Executive Order 14187 and Executive Order 14183 constituted an effort by the Trump administration to "denationalize" transgender people, much in the way that Jews were in 1930s Germany.

== Implementation ==
Hours after the order was signed, the Trump administration deleted mentions of LGBTQ+ resources across federal government websites.

In April 2025, White House press secretary Karoline Leavitt stated, "As a matter of policy, we do not respond to reporters with pronouns in their bios" in response to a journalist who queried her for unrelated information. She later stated, "Any reporter who chooses to put their preferred pronouns in their bio clearly does not care about biological reality or truth and therefore cannot be trusted to write an honest story."

=== Department of State ===
On January 22, 2025, Secretary of State Marco Rubio directed the Department of State to suspend all passport applications seeking a sex marker change or a nonbinary "X" sex marker. By January 23, 2025, a state department webpage describing how to amend the gender marker on passports was taken offline. According to a White House spokesperson, passports that have not expired will remain valid, regardless of how gender is depicted, but new applications will have to comply with the order and designate sex according to that assigned at birth. Some trans people also allege that upon applying to renew their passports, their documents were seized indefinitely and they were not issued a passport in any form.

International travel advisories by the State Department replaced their language on "LGBTQ+ Travelers" with language around "LGB Travelers" and removed reference to issues unique to transgender travelers to other countries.

On February 25, Rubio announced that transgender visa applicants who list a sex other than their assigned sex at birth on their visa application would be permanently banned from entry to the United States, and that applicants who do list their assigned sex on their application but whose home documents list a different sex would have their file marked with the letters 'SWS25' for tracking purposes. The announcement is framed as part of a ban targeting transgender female athletes alongside Executive Order 14201, however according to legal experts, the actual text of the order would apply to all transgender travelers.

==== Passport Policy Implementation ====
According to Executive Order 14168, the State Department is required to look through the prior passport records of every passport applicant to determine if they may have had a passport under a different gender, or a gender that differs from their birth certificate. If this is the case, an information request letter is sent to request early early childhood records listing their sex at birth. The applicant must then send originals of their early childhood records, which must be unamended and unaltered. Amendments are only acceptable in the case of clerical error, and the documentation used to amend the birth certificate will be required to verify that it is for a true clerical error and not for gender identity.

Some indicators of amendment or alteration may include different fonts on parts of their birth certificate, a "date issued" on the document which is not within a few years of the applicant's birth, if the submitted early childhood records are a photocopy as opposed to original paper, or if the name of the applicant is changing from a name ordinary used by one gender to the other. Usually, the applicant's original birth certificate with a "date issued" within a few years of birth will be sufficient. The State Department will then investigate the applicant to determine their sex at birth based on the documentation submitted, as well as any documentation submitted in support of prior passport applications. Once this is done, the new passport will be issued in the applicant's sex at birth, after a review all of all available documentation. The sex marker must be either "M" or "F", which is the case regardless of whether the applicant is intersex or is otherwise non-binary. If none of the applicant's submitted documentation or documentation in State Department databases shows a sex marker of "M" or "F" for this reason, then the applicant may self-attest their sex marker as either "M" or "F". This policy makes it effectively impossible for passport applicants, even those who live in states with strong transgender rights protections or states that allow legal sex changes, to receive a passport that is not in their sex at birth. In certain circumstances, applicants who attempt to circumvent the sex at birth policy through either false statements or amended/altered documentation of their sex may be investigated by Passport Services for passport fraud, or have their passport application denied. This policy took effect in November 2025, after the Supreme Court's stay of Orr v. Trump.

Polices regarding passport adjudication are promulgated through the Department of State's Passport Services Directorate, Office of Adjudication Policy. Previously, information was available in the State Department's Foreign Affairs Manual, however after Executive Order 14168, this section of the FAM was removed. As a result, the policy for sex markers in passports was replaced through diplomatic cables and memoranda sent to passport specialists as well as US embassies and consulates. For example, if a baby born is born with a birth certificate that has an F sex marker, and the parents apply for a passport with that birth certificate, but the doctor corrects the sex of the baby due to an error in sex assignment, the sex change would be denied on future passport applications and the baby would be required to display an F sex marker on all future passports issued under the Executive Order, even if the baby has male genitalia. The key idea behind the Passport Policy is that the documentation issued closest to birth should be used to establish the passport applicant's sex at birth. In this policy, the "issue date" refers to the date that the physical piece of paper (or passport book) was created. Records from the Social Security Administration relating to sex are not used at this time, but the State Department has the theoretical ability to do this in the future.

=== Department of Health and Human Services (HHS) ===
On February 1, 2025, the Centers for Disease Control and Prevention ordered its scientists to retract any not yet published research they had produced which included any of the following banned terms: "Gender, transgender, pregnant person, pregnant people, LGBT, transsexual, non-binary, nonbinary, assigned male at birth, assigned female at birth, biologically male, biologically female". Larry Gostin, director of the World Health Organization Center on Global Health Law, said that the directive amounted to censorship of not only government employees, but private citizens as well. For example, if the lead author of a submitted paper works for the CDC and withdraws their name from the submission, that kills the submission even if coauthors who are private scientists remain on it.

All references to transgender people and gender identity were also removed from the Centers for Disease Control's website. The CDC and other federal agencies also directed their employees to remove pronouns from their email signatures.

The National Institute of Allergy and Infectious Diseases's HIV Language Guide, described in its background introduction as being "designed to help NIAID staff communicate with empowering rather than stigmatizing language", was also removed.

On February 19, the Office on Women's Health launched a website entitled "Protecting Women and Children", which featured a one-page explanation of the department's transgender policy, defining a person's sex as "an immutable biological classification" determined strictly by their reproductive function as either male or female, and featured a video of conservative activist Riley Gaines explaining the new policy.

On February 26, the Centers for Disease Control and Prevention announced it would stop processing transgender-related identity data.

In March 2025, hundreds of National Institutes of Health grants were terminated for including targeted keywords, including relating to LGBT people and/or gender identity in a biomedical context.

In April 2025, at least 34 online archives placed a disclaimer on their sites that reads, "This repository is under review for potential modification in compliance with Administration directives" as a result of this executive order.

In June 2025, the HHS eliminated from their 2026 proposed budget the "Press 3 option" for LGBTQ youth calling the Suicide and Crisis Lifeline (9-8-8) to connect to specialized counselors. Later that month, the Substance Abuse and Mental Health Services Administration (SAMHSA) announced that this service will end on July 17. When asked about the proposed budget cut, a spokesperson for the Office of Management and Budget stated that the youth service was a "chat service where children are encouraged to embrace radical gender ideology".

In July 2025, The Lancet published an investigation which alleged that around half of all US health datasets were secretly and substantially altered in the two months after the executive order was signed, with the alterations being done to remove messages that "promote or otherwise inculcate gender ideology".

In April 2025, the Trump administration demanded that states receiving money for sex education under the Personal Responsibility Education Program (PREP), a program overseen by HHS, remove all references to gender identity, transgender and non-binary people from the curriculum. As of October 2025, at least eleven states have complied with the demands, while 16 other states and Washington DC have filed a lawsuit. On October 27, 2025, the deadline given by the administration to comply or risk losing federal funding, U.S. district court judge Ann Aiken ruled that HHS may not cut funding from states that do not comply.

=== Department of Justice ===
The Human Rights Campaign (HRC) and American Civil Liberties Union (ACLU) said they had received reports that transgender women were being transferred to men's prisons, told they would be, or moved to solitary confinement. The legal director of the HRC said the court orders granting inmates access to gender affirming care remain in effect despite federal policy changes. Data suggests that over 2,000 trans people in federal custody could be affected. The Bureau of Prisons stopped reporting the number of imprisoned transgender people as a result of the order.

Advocates say the order violates the Prison Rape Elimination Act (PREA), a 2003 law requiring trans inmates be housed on a case-by-case basis and federal, state, and local prisons to enforce a zero-tolerance sexual assault policy. They also argued it violated the Americans with Disabilities Act, since the ADA recognizes gender dysphoria as a disability. It was also argued to violate the U.S. Constitution's Fifth Amendment's Due Process Clause and Eighth Amendment's prohibition against cruel and unusual punishment.

On February 24, 2025, U.S. district judge Royce Lamberth temporarily blocked the transfer of trans women in federal prisons to men's facilities, and the denial of their access to hormone therapy. The temporary restraining order was in response to a lawsuit filed the previous week by three imprisoned trans women. In December, the Department of Justice eliminated enforcement of PREA policies designed to protect LGBT prisoners from sexual assault.

In February 2026, the Federal Bureau of Prisons adopted new policies based on policies in Florida that mandated conversion therapy for trans inmates. Under the federal policy, trans inmates would have their hair cut short, be taken off hormone medication, and instead be put into psychiatric therapy and given psychiatric drugs.

=== Intelligence services ===
On February 18, 2025, the DHS Office of Intelligence and Analysis removed from their policy manual rules prohibiting the I&A from surveilling people based solely on their sexual orientation or gender identity.

On February 26, Director of National Intelligence Tulsi Gabbard fired more than 100 intelligence officers from the National Security Agency for discussing in group chats topics relating to preferred pronouns, gender transition, and polyamory, which were deemed "sexually explicit" by investigators. The officers' security clearances were revoked shortly thereafter.

=== Other departments ===
==== Department of Education ====
In February 2025, the Department of Education announced that the Free Application for Federal Student Aid (FAFSA) would be altered to no longer allow students to identify as nonbinary.

In October 2025, pursuant to Executive Order 14235^{[ws]}, titled "Restoring Public Service Loan Forgiveness", the administration finalized revisions to the Public Service Loan Forgiveness program. The rules expand the power of the Education Department to exclude organizations that engage in activities involving a "substantial illegal purpose", including puberty blockers for trans youth (referred to as "chemical castration").

==== Department of Housing and Urban Development ====
On February 7, the Department of Housing and Urban Development declared that they would stop enforcing a 2016 policy prohibiting gender identity discrimination in housing programs and shelter spaces. According to an announcement by HUD Secretary Scott Turner, the goal of this repeal was to allow women's shelters to implement bans on transgender women from entering. In November, the Trump Admin released new rules allowing them to deny funding to any homeless housing program or shelter that "violates the sex binary".

==== Department of the Interior ====
The National Park Service (NPS) removed all references to the existence of transgender people and transgender rights from its webpages covering the Stonewall National Monument, the Stonewall riots, and LGBTQ+ history more broadly, going so far as to change the acronym on the site from "LGBTQ+" to "LGB". NPS similarly altered the acronym on a webpage for the Pauli Murray Family Home in February 2025, and, in addition, blocked the public view of an NPS biography on Pauli Murray which had stated, "we do recognize that pronouns matter".

==== Department of Veteran's Affairs ====
In June 2025, the VA imposed new guidelines on its hospitals, citing this order in allowing hospitals to refuse to hire or treat individuals based on their political affiliation, marital status, and/or worker's union involvement.

==== Department of Homeland Security ====
In February 2025, the Transportation Security Administration issued a policy barring transgender officers from conducting or witnessing security patdowns. In September 2025, U.S. Customs and Border Protection issued new regulations by which they would deny passage in their Advanced Passenger Information System to any passports bearing a non-binary gender marker.

==== Independent federal agencies ====
The National Endowment for the Arts has announced that all 2026 projects must ensure that they are "compliant with all legal, regulatory, and policy requirements applicable to [their] award". This includes not promoting "gender ideology".

The National Science Foundation compiled an internal list of words the presence of which in a research paper, grant application, or other relevant documentation, would flag a project and put its funding under review. Words that would initiate a review included "gender", "LGBT", and "women", among others.

NASA took down webpages relating to LGBTQ+ employee resource groups and diversity at the organization, and according to employees, verbally informed its employees that any display of LGBTQ+ symbols, such as a pride flag in one's workspace, would be met with being placed on administrative leave.

Shortly following the order, the Equal Employment Opportunity Commission's acting chair said that it would no longer allow "X" gender markers for those filing discrimination charges. In mid-February 2025, the EEOC ceased investigating all new claims of discrimination against transgender people in employment, and moved to dismiss current claims. By December, the EEOC had successfully thwarted almost every discrimination claim brought by a trans worker - with the few remaining being those pursued entirely through private lawyers.

In February 2025, the Office of Personnel Management (OPM) announced that insurance carriers that provide health insurance coverage to federal employees under the Federal Employees Health Benefits Program must provide only two options for a person's sex (i.e., male and female) on their insurance forms. In July of that year, the OPM issued a memorandum giving all federal departments until August 11 to revoke any trans-inclusive policies and present a document to the OPM outlining how they did so.

The Social Security Administration removed its pages on gender identity and changing sex identification. It has not responded to requests for comment on its current policy. An internal message sent on January 31, 2025, instructed employees not to accept or process changes to gender markers on Social Security records, effective immediately.

In August 2025, the OPM stated in an internal memo that beginning in 2026, gender-affirming care would no longer be covered by the Federal Employees Health Benefits and Postal Service Health Benefits programs.

=== Non-governmental organizations ===
On February 7, 2025, the National Center for Missing and Exploited Children announced that they would remove all references to trans people from their public-facing materials in order to comply with the executive order. Shortly thereafter, the Rape, Abuse & Incest National Network likewise cut mention of transgender people from its public facing materials.

== Legal challenges ==
=== Prisons ===
On January 26, 2025, an incarcerated trans woman represented by GLBTQ Legal Advocates & Defenders (GLAD) and the National Center for Lesbian Rights (NCLR) filed a lawsuit – Moe v. Trump – in the United States District Court for the District of Massachusetts, alleging that forced transfers and detransition of trans inmates violates the Due Process Clause, Eighth Amendment protections against cruel and unusual punishments, and the Rehabilitation Act of 1973. On January 30, 2025, District Judge George A. O'Toole Jr. unsealed the case and revealed that he had issued a temporary restraining order against transferring the woman or preventing her from receiving gender-affirming care. The organizations went on to file further lawsuits representing three other trans inmates, including two who had previously been sexually assaulted in men's facilities. On February 4, 2025, District Judge Royce Lamberth issued a temporary restraining order against the provision under Eighth Amendment grounds.

On March 7, 2025, the Transgender Law Center and the ACLU filed the class action lawsuit Kingdom v. Trump in the United States District Court for the District of Columbia, on behalf of three incarcerated trans people who were denied access to prescribed hormone therapy due to the provisions of Trump's executive order. On June 3, 2025, judge Royce Lamberth granted a preliminary injunction, blocking enforcement of the executive order for all persons incarcerated in Bureau of Prisons facilities with a medical diagnosis of gender dysphoria.

On September 28, 2026, U.S. solicitor general D. John Sauer filed an emergency request to the U.S. Supreme Court, asking that gender-affirming care be denied to incarcerated trans people while litigation continues in lower courts.

=== Passport applications ===
Orr v. Trump
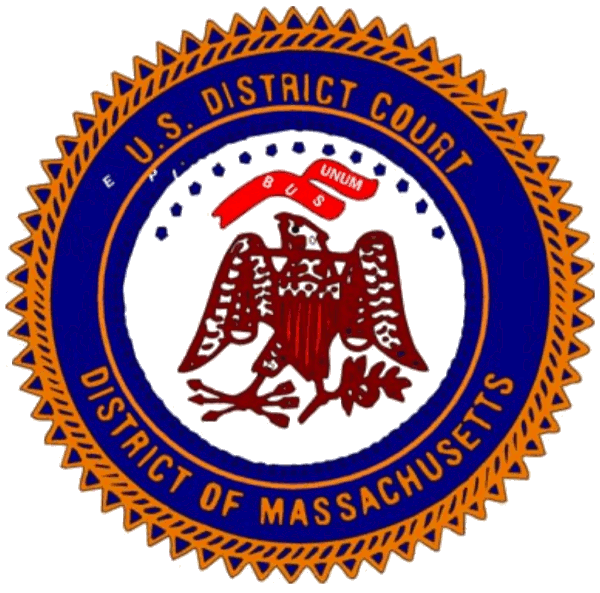
- Court: District of Massachusetts
- Started: February 7, 2025
- Docket nos.: 1:25-cv-10313 (D. Mass.); 25-1579 (1st Cir.); 25a319 (SCOTUS)

Case history
- Appealed to: First Circuit
- Subsequent action: district ruling stayed by Supreme Court via shadow docket

Court membership
- Judge sitting: Julia Kobick

On February 7, 2025, the ACLU filed a lawsuit in Massachusetts challenging changes to passport registration policies that were made under the order, alleging violations of the Administrative Procedure Act (by not providing a customary notice and comment period on associated changes to application forms), the First Amendment (considering one's gender identity to be a protected expression), the Due Process Clause, the Equal Protection Clause, and that they constitute a restriction on the freedom of movement. The preliminary injunction hearing for the case, Orr v. Trump, took place in the US District Court for Massachusetts on March 25, 2025.

On April 18, 2025, a preliminary injunction was issued by District Judge Julia Kobick to stop enforcement of the order for six plaintiffs, stating that it was based on animus demonstrating "irrational prejudice toward transgender Americans", therefore offending the "constitutional commitment to equal protection for all Americans". On June 17, 2025, Kobick approved a class certification that effectively suspends the policy nationwide, by extending the temporary restraining order to all Americans who sought to receive a passport with an "X" gender marker or a gender marker which does not match their sex as defined by the executive order.

Following the Supreme Court's decision in United States v. Skrmetti, in which the court, under a rational basis decision, upheld a Tennessee law that banned gender affirming care for minors and rejected the challenge that the law violated sex discrimination, the government motioned to have Kobick's order dissolved. Kobick declined the motion, stating the government had failed to demonstrate why rational basis should be used for the passport case, in addition to other challenges related to the Administrative Procedure Act.

On September 19, 2025, the justice department filed an emergency request with the Supreme Court to lift Kobick's injunction. On November 6, 2025, the Supreme Court granted the administration's request, halting the lower court's injunction while the lawsuit continues. The Supreme Court issued its ruling in three sentences, stating that "Displaying passport holders' sex at birth no more offends equal protection principles than displaying their country of birth—in both cases, the Government is merely attesting to a historical fact without subjecting anyone to differential treatment". The State Department allows passport applicants to change their country of birth, provided they submit an amended birth certificate. However, the Supreme Court ruling allows the State Department to restart its policy of reverting the sex markers of passport applicants to the sex assigned on the birth certificate issued (printed or created) closest to birth, regardless of whether the applicant's birth certificate is amended or corrected.

=== Removal of documents ===
On February 13, 2025, following a lawsuit by Doctors for America, Judge John Bates issued a temporary restraining order, requiring that the CDC, FDA, and HHS restore web pages that it had retracted in compliance with the order. However, the restored pages were amended with a disclaimer stating: "Any information on this page promoting gender ideology is extremely inaccurate and disconnected from the immutable biological reality that there are two sexes, male and female."

=== Civil rights ===
On February 19, 2025, the civil rights organizations National Urban League, National Fair Housing Alliance, and AIDS Foundation of Chicago filed a federal lawsuit challenging the attacks on DEI and accessibility in executive orders 14168, 14151, and 14173. The organizations filing the lawsuit, National Urban League v. Trump, are represented by Lambda Legal and the Legal Defense Fund.

On February 20, 2025, nine nonprofit organizations supporting LGBTQ and HIV-affected communities filed a lawsuit, San Francisco AIDS Foundation v. Trump, challenging executive orders 14168, 14151, and 14173. The organizations are represented by Lambda Legal.

On December 22, 2025, a transgender data scientist employed by the National Security Agency filed a lawsuit, O'Neill v. Hartman, stating that EO 14168 denies her "very existence" and violates Title VII of the Civil Rights Act.

=== Freedom of speech ===
On March 6, 2025, four arts organizations that support transgender and nonbinary art and artists filed a lawsuit against the National Endowment for the Arts (NEA). The suit, Rhode Island Latino Arts v. National Endowment for the Arts, argues that the NEA's prohibition on funding the promotion of "gender ideology" violates first and fifth amendment rights. The organizations are represented by the ACLU.

=== Federal funding ===
On March 1, 2025, Judge Lauren King blocked the part of the executive order that sought to cut federal funding for programs that "promote gender ideology" and withhold federal funding from health-care providers who offer gender-affirming care to minors.

HHS implemented this Executive Order in March 2026, by imposing conditions attached to Ryan White HIV/AIDS Program. The conditions barred funding recipients from acknowledging transgender identity or providing gender-affirming care. Medical associations and healthcare providers challenged them in the District Court of Massachusetts, filing suit against the Trump administration in June. Judge William G. Young ruled for the plaintiffs on November 19, holding that the restrictions violated the first and fifth amendments and were "based in animus, loathing, and discrimination".

== Reactions ==
=== Organizations ===
==== For ====
Jim Daly, president of Focus on the Family, issued a statement in support of the executive order stating in part "We are long overdue in this effort to re-establish the exclusivity of two genders". The American Family Association has praised the change as one that "acknowledges the truth". The Alliance Defending Freedom stated that the order is a "180-degree turn back toward reality and common sense". The Women's Liberation Front (WoLF), an American trans-exclusionary radical feminist organization that opposes transgender rights, sees the executive order as a "major victory".

==== Against ====
The executive order was widely condemned as "extremist" by feminist, LGBTQ+, and civil rights organizations. According to The New Republic, the executive order is "packed with the kinds of conspiratorial thinking about gender and sexuality that have become commonplace on the right". The American Civil Liberties Union's Chase Strangio described the executive order as aimed at eradicating trans people from civic and public life. The ACLU vowed to take the Trump administration to court "wherever we can" to defend LGBTQ+ rights.

Human Rights Campaign President Kelley Robinson said "today's expected executive actions targeting the LGBTQ+ community serve no other purpose than to hurt our families and our communities" and that "we will fight back against these harmful provisions with everything we've got". Advocates for Trans Equality stated that it would continue to protect national transgender rights. Asian Americans Advancing Justice also expressed its intention to "confront hate and discrimination in all its forms" regarding the order.

The National Organization for Women condemned Trump's "extremist executive orders spree" and "scorecard of shame" that NOW said is "defined by cruelty, not common sense, and puts people in real danger". The National Council of Jewish Women and Keshet issued a joint statement condemning Trump's actions targeting the LGBTQ+ community for "seeking to erase federal recognition of trans people" and said that these actions are designed to instill hatred, promising to fight them with legal action.

The Lemkin Institute for Genocide Prevention has described the executive order, along other Trump executive orders targeting trans people, as part of a "genocidal process against the transgender community". Gregory Stanton, founder of Genocide Watch, has described the withdrawal of recognition of trans identities by the United States as "'totalitarian' and driven by 'Nazi ideology'."

The assertions of the executive order were described as being at odds with determinations of expert groups including the American Medical Association, which holds that gender identity is a spectrum, not an "immutable male–female binary".

In February 2025, 463 artists signed a letter asking the National Endowment for the Arts to roll back the restrictions on the funding of projects promoting DEI or "gender ideology".

=== Politicians and elected offices ===
Maryland's Attorney General Anthony Brown released a statement denouncing the order, stating that it would threaten peoples' lives, and that he aimed to "protect all Marylanders – especially members of marginalized communities – and wants transgender residents of our State to know that they belong, they matter, and our Office will fight for their rights and safety".

=== International ===
According to Voice of America, the order received mixed reactions across Africa, with conservatives welcoming it and gay rights activists condemning it.

Canadian human rights groups and activists have, in response to the order, called for transgender and non-binary people to be exempted from the Safe Third Country Agreement (which prevents asylum claimants from making a claim in Canada after first arriving in the U.S.). In July 2025, Justice Julie Blackhawk of the Canadian Federal Court blocked the deportation of a non-binary person who had been attempting to immigrate from the United States to Canada, pending further judicial rulings. Blackhawk ruled that the pre-removal risk assessment conducted by an immigration officer had "failed to consider recent evidence of the conditions that may have supported a reasonable fear of persecution" under present conditions for LGBTQ+ people in the United States.

== See also ==
- 2020s anti-LGBTQ movement in the United States
- LGBTQ rights in the United States
- Anti-LGBT curriculum laws in the United States
- Culture war
- Gender-critical feminism
- History of transgender people in the United States
  - Transgender disenfranchisement in the United States
  - Transgender rights in the United States
  - Transphobia in the United States
  - Persecution of transgender people under the second Trump administration
- Identity documents in the United States
- List of executive orders in the second presidency of Donald Trump
  - Executive Order 14151 ("Ending Radical and Wasteful Government DEI Programs and Preferencing")
  - Executive Order 14183 ("Prioritizing Military Excellence and Readiness")
  - Executive Order 14187 ("Protecting Children from Chemical and Surgical Mutilation")
- Parental rights movement
- For Women Scotland Ltd v The Scottish Ministers (UKSC 16, 2025)
- Cass Review
