= Stop AIDS Project =

STOP AIDS Project
- Company type: Non Profit Organization
- Founded: 1985, San Francisco
- Defunct: 2011
- Headquarters: 2128 15th Street, San Francisco, CA 94114
- Number of employees: 20+ (Staff); 300+ (volunteers)
- Website: www.STOPAIDS.org

STOP AIDS Project (SAP) was a nonprofit organization which worked to prevent transmission of HIV among all gay, bisexual, and trans men in San Francisco, California, through multicultural, community based organising.

== Mission ==
The mission statement of the STOP AIDS Project evolved from "The mission of the STOP AIDS Project is to prevent HIV Transmission among gay men in San Francisco" to "The mission of the STOP AIDS Project is to prevent HIV Transmission among all gay, bisexual and transgender men in San Francisco through collaborative and multicultural, community based organising."

== History ==
The STOP AIDS project emerged out of research conducted by the San Francisco AIDS Foundation and the San Francisco Department of Public Health. In 1984, the San Francisco AIDS Foundation, along with funding provided by the San Francisco Department of Public Health, contracted with Research & Decisions Corporation to conduct a survey of gay and bisexual men in San Francisco. The Foundation wanted to know and understand what men knew about AIDS, their concerns on a personal and community level and the effects, if any, of AIDS on their sexual behavior. This information would be used by the Foundation to plan future educational and prevention programs within the community at large.

Research & Decisions Corporation, under contract, conducted a series of focus groups to gather the information requested by the San Francisco AIDS Foundation. Small groups of gay and bisexual men were brought together for a series of group interviews. These men were all sexually active and at risk for contracting AIDS.

Feedback from the men who attended these focus groups and subsequent follow-up interviews indicated that participation in the group process was valuable. Participants expressed an appreciation for the opportunity to discuss their concerns about AIDS openly and free of judgment. They felt less isolated and indicated their fears were lessened by sharing their thoughts and feelings. Most reported a change in their behavior as a result of participating in the focus groups, which has been reported effective in motivating high-risk men to end transmission of the AIDS virus.

After completion of the survey, Larry Bye of Research & Decisions Corporation and Sam Puckett of the San Francisco AIDS Foundation began formulating a concept for grass-roots-inspired social change. The focus group model was modified, changing the focus from collecting information to one that encourages genuine dialogue about AIDS prevention and related issues of health and well-being among gay and bisexual men. It was conceived as "an experiment in communication."

Bye and Puckett presented their ideas to the San Francisco Department of Public Health in December 1984. The result of this presentation was a one-time grant from the city for $75,000 to conduct a pilot project that would allow 1,000 gay and bisexual men to participate. The grant, awarded in January 1985 was given to the Shanti Project, with the understanding that Research & Decisions Corporation would develop and administer the project. Group facilitators were selected in early February. They were thoroughly trained in the format to be used for the groups. Through the work of the small initial corps of staff and consultants, participants were recruited to attend the first group sessions, which were called STOP AIDS meetings.

Meetings were initially held in the focus group facilities of Research & Decisions Corporation. As participants experienced the groups, many offered their homes as places to meet. Beginning the first week of March, groups were being held all over San Francisco nearly every day of the week, including weekends. By the time the pilot project ended in early June, approximately 950 men and women had participated in STOP AIDS meetings.

When the "pilot" phase concluded, the STOP AIDS Project was formed and incorporated as a California nonprofit corporation.

SAP's organizational structure consisted of a Board of Directors, salaried staff, and pro-bono community volunteers. The employed staff of SAP are as follows: 1) Project Administrator, responsible to the Board of Directors for the operation of the Project 2) Outreach Coordinator, responsible for invitation and community organization efforts 3) Scheduling Coordinator, manager of the office and scheduler of group meetings. In addition to the salaried staff, the project employed the services of two health education consultants, who provided program design and management services to the organization.

Internationally recognized as a successful model of grassroots prevention and support, SAP brought diverse gay, bisexual, and trans men together to talk about the challenges and issues posed by HIV and AIDS through neighborhood outreach, for example on busy streets or outside bars and nightclubs; workshops, often held in the living rooms of residents; and community forums. Such outreach took form in many ways, including clothing, pins, stickers, risk assessment surveys, condoms, safe injection kits, and other miscellaneous objects. Some programs were designed for specific groups of men, such as Q-Action for men under 25 or Our Love for men of color.

Their work extended beyond education—helping change behavior, create personal commitment to safer sex, build community support for each individual with the vision that "HIV Transmission Can Be Prevented".

By 1985, in response to rising deaths from AIDS, SAP had reached over 30,000 men in 2 years, with many starting to practice safe sex. In 1987 it shut its doors in response to data showing that HIV transmission rates in San Francisco dropped to less than 1%.

Between 1987 and 1990, the STOP AIDS Resource Center shared the experience to help sixteen other communities across the country establish their own HIV prevention programs, an idea sparked by the visit in 1986 of a group of New Zealanders trying to learn from the experience of SAP in San Francisco.

In May 1990, SAP re-opened its doors in San Francisco due to rising HIV transmission rates in the city. In 2011, SAP merged with the San Francisco AIDS Foundation.

In 1992 the CDC gave a grant which enabled the it to grow its staff. Public support was sometimes controversial as its material was often sexually explicit, which some found offensive. In 2002 the CDC conducted an audit of SAP, in response to allegations of misuse of federal funds and obscene content. They determined that the SAP was in compliance with Federal law and local guidelines and founded on evidence-based, sound prevention science. The records of SAP are held at Stanford University.

== The STOP AIDS Model ==
A central facet of SAP was its "STOP AIDS Model" of AIDS prevention that encouraged changes in community standards to support reduced risk behavior. The model combined grassroots community organizing techniques with a small group discussion format. The resulting interactions provide opportunities for individuals at risk for AIDS to discuss and scrutinize peer norms, community standards, individual responsibility, and related issues of health and well-being. As larger numbers of people are contacted and participate in this expanding dialogue about AIDS prevention, a critical shift in attitude influences risk behavior change in the entire community.
