= Untersuchungen über die Bedeutung der Deszendenztheorie für die Psychologie =

1903 book by Max E.Ettlinger

Untersuchungen über die Bedeutung der Deszendenztheorie für die Psychologie (English: Examinations of the Implications of the Theory of Common Descent for Psychology) is a book written by German psychologist, pedagogist, aesthetician and philosopher Max E. Ettlinger. It was published in 1903 for the Görres Gesellschaft zur Pflege der Wissenschaft im katholischen Deutschland (English: Görres Society).

== Context ==
Ettlinger's book presents a criticism of many of the contemporary scientific and philosophical notions. He especially focuses on the impact of these discoveries on psychology and the accompanying philosophical debate, referring to the works of authors such as Charles Darwin, Edward Thorndike and Ernst Häckel. This relates Ettlinger's criticism to many of the developments of psychology as a discipline during the prior centuries.

=== Common descent and psychology ===
The idea of common descent, stating that all life forms originated from one or several primitive common ancestors, influenced the way psychology as a discipline and specifically psychological methods of investigation developed, which prompted Ettlinger to write the book. At the end of the 19th century the field of comparative psychology emerged as a consequence of Darwin's observations of evolutionary mechanisms. Through this theoretical framework, and by popularizing the theory of common descent Darwin also made it relevant for psychologists to compare animals to humans mentally. Although possible comparisons between animal and human minds had been previously stressed in the writings of enlightenment thinkers such as David Hume, most philosophical thought had seen a clear distinction between animals and humans in the development of certain mental faculties. This way of thinking about mental processes in animals was continued in the late 19th century by those who had otherwise accepted Darwin's theory and the principle of natural selection, including Alfred Wallace who was a strong proponent of Darwinism but excluded the human mind as its subject. This disagreement of Darwinists about the applicability of natural selection to the human mind is also picked up by Ettlinger in the book.

Darwin's theory of natural selection had been under debate at the time, among others by Ettlinger himself, although the number of academics adopting alternative theories such as that of Jean-Baptiste Lamarck to explain the problems common descent posed had declined towards the turn of the century. The problem of blending inheritance, which had been used to criticize the theory of natural selection in its early stages, had largely been resolved by the independent rediscovery of the importance of Mendel's work by Hugo de Vries, Carl Correns, and Erich von Tschermak in 1900. Although the general problem of blending inheritance had been resolved there was still no sufficient explanation of the mechanisms behind inheritance and how genes were passed on from one generation to the next.

Despite lacking clarity about the specifics of Darwinian evolution, the theory rapidly spread to Germany, where it was defended among others by Ernst Häckel, and encouraged psychologists worldwide to expand the study of animals beyond the already existing biological field of comparative anatomy to comparative psychology. Animal research was favored over research in humans as certain behavioral processes could be made visible more easily, for instance by surgical operations on animals' nervous systems. Early comparative psychology still had to deal with problems such as the frequent anthropomorphising of animals by researchers and the coherent integration of anatomical knowledge about the nervous system with that of reflexes and with psychological causation, which also had implications for works on the philosophy of mind. One of Ettlinger's aims in his work was to point out those weaknesses, by explaining the state of animal psychology.

=== Common descent and the mind body problem ===
The predominant philosophy of mind around 1903, and up until the 1960s had been that of dualism, seeing the mind as a non-physical and the body as a physical entity. Dualism is a hypernym, including several different views of the mind body problem. Historically, interactionism, in which the mind interacts with the body in some undefined way has been contrasted to parallelism in which the mind and body do not interact causally but act in parallel, in such a manner that all mental and bodily events are correlated, leading to a coherent subjective experience. This debate makes up one of the central topics of "Untersuchungen über die Bedeutung der Deszendenztheorie für die Psychologie", forming the main subject of the first of six chapters, as a broad answer to the problem is seen as a prerequisite for the debate about comparative psychology by Ettlinger.

Prior to the beginning of comparative psychology, most psychological research had focussed on the contrast between people's perceptions and the actual world, accompanied by the philosophical debate around the mind-body problem. Most psychological research on animals had been anecdotal, as may be seen in the pioneering work of Romanes, and included frequent anthropomorphisms making the formation of a coherent theoretical framework difficult to achieve. In 1989 a new way of conducting psychological research gained popularity when Edward Thorndike published his work on the law of effect which later became the basis of operant conditioning. Through the employment of his so-called Puzzle-Boxes, Thorndike was able to show that certain actions in animals could be increased in the frequency of their occurrence if those actions were followed by a stimulus, usually consisting of food, that was perceived as positive by the animal. Aversive stimuli following a behavior on the other hand would decrease the frequency with which an action would be performed. The methodology used by Thorndike and the resulting observation about learning in animals constituted a step towards an objective animal psychology attempting to satisfy Morgan's Canon. A further step in this direction was made at the turn of the century with Ivan Pavlov's serendipity of what later became known as classical conditioning. With these discoveries the examination of subjective experience through introspection was no longer the only way to conduct research in animals and a solution to the mind body problem was not a necessary prerequisite for conducting animal research.

Opposing the scientific trends in psychology, Ettlinger was a strong opponent of such a behavioral approach to conducting research, describing it in the terms of Friedrich Albert Lange as "Psychology without Soul". He specifically opposed Wilhelm Wundt's idea of a parallelist approach to psychology. He further rejected a materialist view of the human mind that sets it equal with the brain and its processes. To support this argument he pointed towards the insufficiently clear localization of brain areas, the ability to partially regain mental functions after brain injury through recruitment of unaffected brain areas, as well as the lack of a physiological explanation for memory-formation through integration of different sensory modalities, and, more important still, no existing prospects of explaining the existence of judgment and free will on a physical basis. Instead, Ettlinger held an interactionist view of the mind and the brain, in which after brain injury, the mind would merely lose its means of communication with the body.

=== Common descent and the church ===
Major criticisms against Darwinism and therefore indirectly against the new comparative psychology emanated from the Catholic church under Pope Leo XIII. Ettlinger had been part of the neo-scholastic movement at the time of writing the book. Neo-Scholasticism had emerged in the late 19th century as a philosophical defense by the Catholic church against enlightenment ideas and the movement known as modernism which were seen as harmful to Christian morality. The philosophy was in the following carried on by the Society of Jesus. Some authors also suggest that the rise of the Neo-Scholastic movement was largely driven by the adoption of evolution within scientific communities, pointing towards a perceived threat of the church's influence in science not only due to the enlightenment but also due to Darwin's theory directly. Ettlinger himself expressed his optimistic views about the movement, believing that it would eventually reunite science with a theological world view. In doing so, Ettlinger also denounced religious arguments stating that the fact that science does not disprove the existence of God proves God's existence, showing a critical view on the defense of Christianity against science.

Unlike most of his Catholic contemporaries, Ettlinger did not oppose Darwinian evolution because of its incompatibility with a Christian faith. Ettlinger saw the fact that Darwin's most important student George John Romanes was able to return to a Christian world view as proof that Darwinism would not contradict religious ideas. He evaluated the reason for Darwin's own atheism to be his rigid way of thinking and his exclusively "inductive" mind. Instead, Ettlinger criticized the theory objectively based on the unresolved problems it presented.

In their 1903 annual report the Görres Society, for which the book was published, described its mission to conduct science in the name of the Catholic faith as challenged by the fact that Catholics had become a minority among scientist. It was argued by the society's president Georg von Hertling that the Görres Society should compensate for this shortcoming by publishing scientific works. He wrote that the increasing public belief in their biased and unreasonable scientific practices has made it harder for Catholic scholars to gain recognition. Ettlinger was closely affiliated with the society through Hertling who was his teacher and a central figure in his conversion to Catholicism. In 1906 he was responsible for founding the natural science section of the Görres Society together with the Jesuit Erich Wasmann, allegedly as a response to Häcke's foundation of the "Deutsche Monistenbund", which was based on a materialist, monist philosophy of mind.

=== The purpose of the book ===
Ettlinger's religious but critical views of psychology and philosophy are reflected in a quoted bible verse above the preface of the book:

"Ubi non est scientia, non est bonum;

et qui festinus est pedibus, offendet."

(English: "Also, that the soul be without knowledge, it is not good;

and he that hasteth with his feet sinneth.")

— Prov. XIX, 2.

He expresses his opinion that the advances in experimental psychology, made in the previous century, do not allow for the use of an often ambiguous "popular psychology", in trying to answer the important philosophical and scientific questions around the implications of common descent for psychology. The book aims at creating such an approach to the theory of common descent. Ettlinger further describes that the book was not entirely unique in its content as similar points had been raised by Carl Stumpf and Oswald Külpers before the book could be published. Despite having published the work for a Catholic organization, Ettlinger describes his intent as an objective examination of the theory of common descent unaffected by the broader philosophical and theological attempts to answer the world riddles. This objective writing style Ettlinger exhibits and his agreeable treatment of intellectual opponents have been notice in many of his other works as well.

== Contents ==
=== Structure ===
The book is structured in a preface, an introduction and three chapters. While clarifying the aim of the book in the preface, the introduction focuses on the origins and problems of the theory of common descent and presents a criticism of Darwinian selection as a solution to these problems. The first chapter focuses on the possible value and limitations of the theory for psychology, creating a basis for the following discussion. The second and third chapters focus on how consciousness can be determined and how learning and memory in animals may allow for the examination of animal consciousness respectively. In the fourth chapter Ettlinger examines the characteristics of animal consciousness with regards to self-awareness while he highlights the defining characteristics of human consciousness in the fifth chapter. The last chapter draws a conclusion about the use of the theory of common descent in psychology.

=== Darwinism ===
In the book Ettlinger presents a critical examination of what the validity of common descent implies for research in the field of psychology and comparative psychology. In the introduction, an argument against using Charles Darwin's concept of natural selection as an explanation of common descent is laid out. Ettlinger describes the concept of natural selection as disputed among biologists and criticizes how it is introduced by Darwin. Among several arguments it is described that the concept of selective breeding which Darwin draws on to explain natural selection is an incorrect analogy since it assumes environmental conditions that are seldom met in nature, such as gradual, stepwise changes in the environment into the same direction, that last long enough for organisms to adapt. As a philosophical argument against natural selection Ettlinger also quotes Aristotle who observed the phenomenon that all things in the universe fulfill a function, describing it with the words: “But God and nature create nothing that has not its use.” Ettlinger expresses the opinion that Darwin unsuccessfully tries to explain this phenomenon through natural selection by defining it too narrowly as applying only to living organisms. Other aspects of Darwin's theory, such as the at the time insufficiently identified source and character of variation are also criticized.

=== Comparative psychology ===
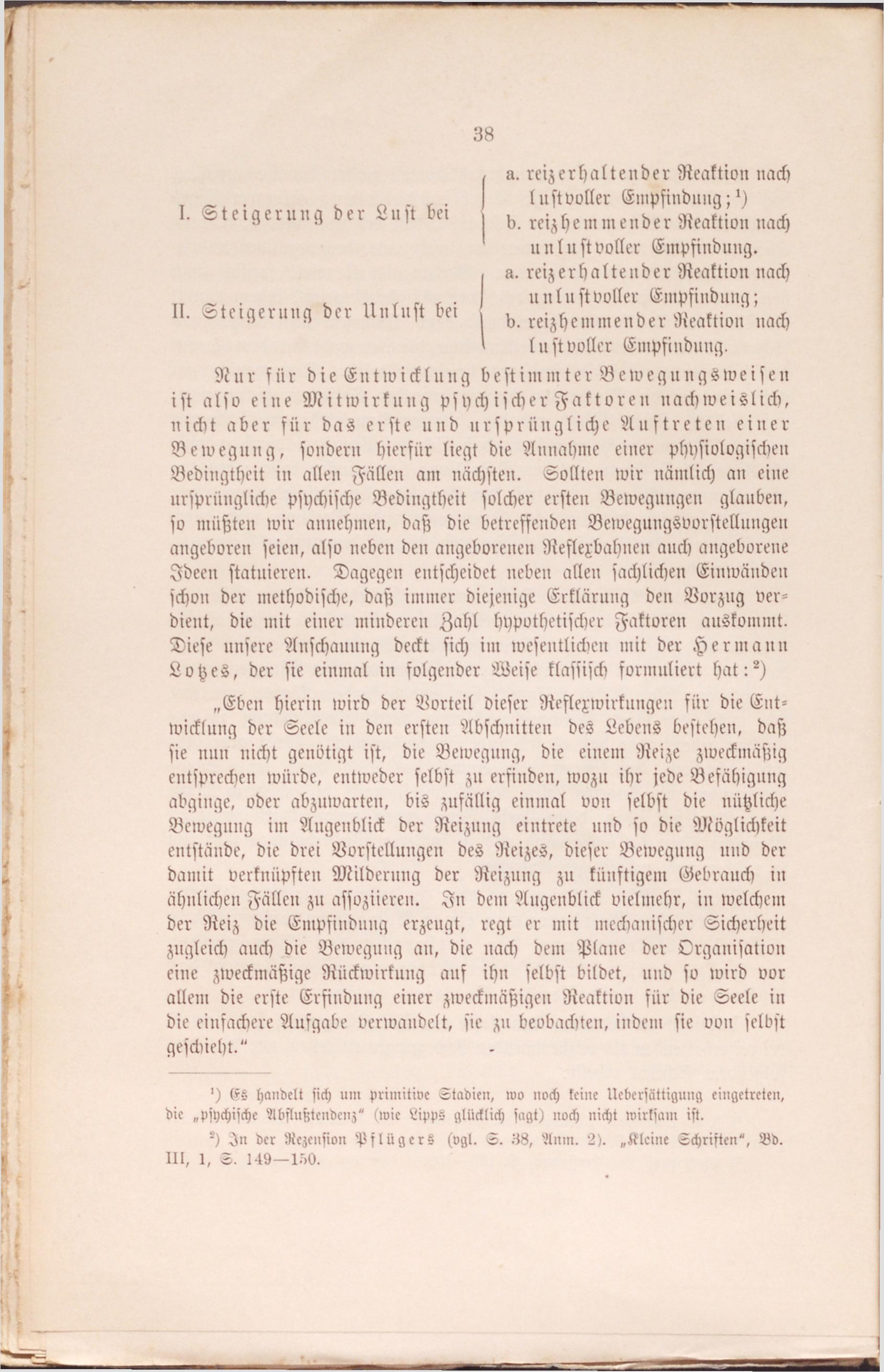
Ettlinger's conceptualization of the learning process through operant conditioning using positive/negative reinforcement/punishment.

The book lists other fundamental assumptions that need to be made in order to effectively use the theory of common descent in psychology and criticizes the view of contemporary scholars that have in Ettlinger's opinion led to confusion. One of the fundamental assumptions Ettlinger proposes to correctly use a comparative psychology based on common descent, is that research needs to assume psychophysical interactionism as a philosophy of mind to be able to make inferences about the animal mind from animal behavior, instead of psychophysical parallelism which has previously been held by some psychologists conducting animal research. He further argues that behavior and other physiological processes alone should not be subject of psychology, as proposed by Herbert Spencer, but should only be examined by psychologists if they aid to the understanding of subjective experience, which Ettlinger viewed as the only subject of psychology.

Later in the book, Ettlinger describes limitations that need to be kept in mind when using animal behavior as a criterion of consciousness to analyze the animal psyche. It is concluded that only changes in behavior through learning by reinforcement and the formation of associations can reliably be used as indicators of animal consciousness, since behavior at any moment in time may be the result of reflexes or psychological causation alike. Ettlinger also points towards a more fundamental problem for comparative psychology. He explains that analogy to the own mind is necessary to draw a conclusions about an animal's mental processes, because this limitation, known as the other minds problem, also applies when inferring the consciousness of other human beings. This also implies that the limitations of introspection apply to the process of making inferences about consciousness. One of the limitations of introspection is the fact that it needs to be carried out retrospectively on the memory of events rather than events themselves, if the memory is to not be distorted by the act of introspection itself. Since memory of events is limited and details are often filled in, the experiences that are described in introspective verbal report are often less detailed than those encountered during the activity. Ettlinger describes that this leads to the assumption of a gradual consciousness which is weaker for events that have happened longer times ago, while consciousness should be described as an all or nothing phenomenon according to him.

=== The human mind ===
The book describes the human psyche as distinct from the animal psyche in several regards. Ettlinger sees the main distinguishing feature of the human mind in the ability to create general rules from few examples of an event. By referring to Ernst Meumann's theory of language formation, he describes this ability of abstraction as the reason for the development of flexible language, the ability to teach older children without making them experience a certain situation and ultimately the emergence of culture. Animals and very young children on the other hand are described to be bound to learning by experience through the mechanisms of conditioning by reinforcements and by associating stimuli to other positive or aversive unconditioned stimuli. From this Ettlinger draws the conclusion that animals cannot apply learned knowledge to situations in which the context is different from the environment of the conditioning scenario, leading to less flexible behavior. He also argues that the human mind as it exists in adults cannot have evolved gradually due to the specification of sensory organs and their distinct sensations. He elaborates that these psychological sensations could not have evolved gradually as such gradual development of mental qualities is unprecedented in human ontogenesis. This he describes as an unsolvable obstacle for the application of the theory of common descent to the human mind.

=== Conclusion ===
The book concludes that using the theory of common descent to create a comparative psychology creates unclarity and confusion in psychological research and theory which Ettlinger sees as a reason for the decline in popularity comparative psychology had been facing. He explains that psychological principles may be applied to explain the theory of common descent in return. In this approach an animal would through learning adapt to a certain environment and develop physical adaptations as a consequence of the psychological ones. Ettlinger expresses that this would create a more plausible explanation of the source of variation than the one delivered by Darwin.

== Reception ==
=== The immediate impact ===
Following the publication of "Untersuchungen über die Bedeutung der Deszendenztheorie für die Psychologie", Ettlinger wrote two important further works on the topic of animal psychology titled "Einführung in die Tierpsychologie" (English: Introduction to Animal Psychology), published in 1921, and "Lehre von der Tierseele" (English: Teachings of the Animal Mind), published in 1925. His efforts to defend Catholic morality against opposing forces continued when he became professor of philosophy in Munich and was involved in founding the Deutsche Institut für wissenschaftliche Pädagogik (English: German institute of scientific pedagogy.) which sought to create a pedagogy with emphasis on Catholic moral education. Ettlinger's philosophical views on animal psychology and consciousness also influenced other important Catholics such as Edith Stein who taught and studied at the institute.

Ettlinger, as well as many other catholic intellectuals under Georg von Hertling, had the aim of influencing educational policy in Germany by defending it from modernist scholars who had overtaken many of the teaching positions at German universities. This effort represented a continuation of the neo-scholastic movement, motivated by the political goal of the preservation of traditional Christian values, as manifested in the Centre Party during the Weimar Republic.

In his book "Die psychischen Fähigkeiten der Ameisen" (English: The psychological Capabilities of Ants), Wasman responds to Ettlinger's view, expressed in "Untersuchungen über die Bedeutung der Deszendenztheorie für die Psychologie", that psychological qualities or consciousness are a prerequisite for the formation of associative memory and learning. He acknowledges that although this is true, Ettlinger underestimates scientists' ability to infer these qualities. Ettlinger was of the opinion that only associative learning could be taken as a criterion of consciousness. Instead, Wasmann believed that even in lower animals, consciousness could be inferred with a certain probability. Ettlinger himself later changed his stance on certain topics expressed in the book. He for instance stated that he no longer believed the gradual evolution of sensory qualities from the sensory qualities of a single organ (a skin cell) would prove to be a fatal obstacle to the theory of common descent in the field of psychology. He argued that, in very primitive organisms, there is a single primordial sense encompassing all sensations, implying that this sense may have evolved gradually to differentiated into the different human senses.

The book was later mentioned as one of Ettlingers important works in the chronicles of the "Revue néoscolastique de philosophie" upon Ettlinger's death. Not many of the major ideas expressed in the book itself with regards to the approach to conducting psychological research, its perspective on the mind body problem and its views on the theory of evolution were able to hold in the scientific and philosophical world.

=== Suppression of Ettlinger's ideas ===
Throughout the early 20th century the church remained the strongest opponent of darwinism and many of the works of German darwinists such as Häckel had been burned during the national socialist regime often due to the socialist and liberal views of the authors. Catholic authors were however also under censorship during this time. The Hochland magazine in which Ettlinger had frequently published his opinions and for which he had been the editor from 1908 to 1917 was restricted in its ability to publish and was banned in 1941 as one of the last Catholic magazines along with some jesuit publications.

Before, and in part throughout, this time the psychoanalytic approaches of psychiatrists such as Freud and Jung dominated 20th century psychology in Europe. The main continuation of comparative psychology and the application of conditioning as defined by Thorndike and Pavlov originated from North America in the form of the behaviorist movement. Behaviorism in psychology was driven by John B. Watson as an attempt to create an objective psychology independent of the method of introspection which he saw as prone to errors and unreliable. Instead of using introspection only behavior should be consulted to study the psychology of humans as well as animals, without inferring any mental processes at all. In doing this Watson also faced the challenge of explaining many psychoanalytic concepts in terms of conditioning and other behavioral mechanisms and succeeded at expressing many of the phenomena observed by Freud this way. Since it could be shown that using behaviorism in such way to explain psychological processes would make it a viable alternative to Freudian psychoanalysis, the movement quickly gained in popularity with research in comparative psychology as its main inspiration. This development of psychology as a discipline is in contradiction to the subjective methods advertised by authors like Ettlinger.

=== The development of the mind body problem ===
Simultaneously, the philosophy of mind changed throughout the 20th century changed fundamentally. Research on the brain in relation to the mind was able to progress at a quicker rate. With discoveries such as the ones by Carl Wernicke, the localization of certain cognitive functions in the brain had begun during the late 19th century but was now becoming increasingly sophisticated. In one of his later works titled "Zur Entwicklung der Raumanschauung bei Mensch und Tier" (English: On the Development of Spatial Awareness in Man and Animal) Ettlinger retracts some of the views expressed in "Untersuchungen über die Bedeutung der Deszendenztheorie für die Psychologie" because of such developments. He states that animal research can be more useful to psychologists than he previously assumed since it has led to advances in the field of brain localization. With increasing knowledge of the effects of brain damage on mental processes, or at least on their expression, it became increasingly difficult to defend certain dualist philosophies of mind such as parallelism.

Despite having first emerged as a research program independent of the mind-body problem itself, behaviorism also spawned its own philosophy of mind. With Burrhus Skinner's radical behaviorism, a philosophy of mind emerged which equated behavior with mind, thereby providing an explanation of the mind-body problem without a non-physical mind. Due to inherent problems of explaining all mental processes in terms of behavior, the view was quickly replaced by the notion of functionalism which was derived in analogy to the Turing Machine, describing each mental state in terms of its functions. Functionalism had the advantage over behaviorism, that it was able to explain how mental events may cause each other in a chain of mental processes eventually leading to behavior. This way it can also account for contemplating thought that does not lead to behavior. Ettlinger saw this type of thought as a major argument for dualism, making the rise of a philosophy such as functionalism a challenge to his argument.

Subsequently, more biological approaches to the mind body problem and psychology in general became available. The idea that learning for instance could occur through changes in brain connectivity during the simultaneous activation of weakly connected neurons was introduced by Donald Hebb. This too contradicts Ettlingers argumentation, which sees learning as the criterion of consciousness precisely because there was no way of explaining it in physical terms when the book was written. Through such explanations an objective psychology emerged, replacing the use of introspection to investigate subjective experience, with biological observations and theories, to create a scientific psychology. In his book, Ettlinger had advocated against such an objective psychology as he thought psychology should only be concerned with subjective experience as its subject and only draw on physiological processes if they relate to that subjective experience. This he thought to be limited as there were no good theoretical and empirical grounds on which to link physical events with mental ones.

Much of the evidence Ettlinger had previously used to defend his dualist position against materialism also lost credibility. With Hebbian learning and neural plasticity the recovery of mental functions after brain damage could for example be explained with physical processes. Similarly, new neuroscientific and philosophical theories delivered support for a materialist understanding of free will or the absence thereof.

=== The church and evolution ===
Later during the 20th century the Catholic church gradually took a more liberal position towards evolutionary theory in the Darwinian sense, through natural selection, as scientific advances in the field of genetics made it increasingly difficult to defend alternative theories. Notably, it still defended the view that the human soul forms an exception from the process of evolution and is divine in nature. Religious resistance against Darwinism continues to this day for example in the movement of creationism. Scientists and philosophers on the other hand have mostly accepted natural selection to be true. Hence, views on natural selection similar to those of Ettlinger align with further developments within the church but not within scientific communities.
