= Leo T. Sorokin =

American judge (born 1961)

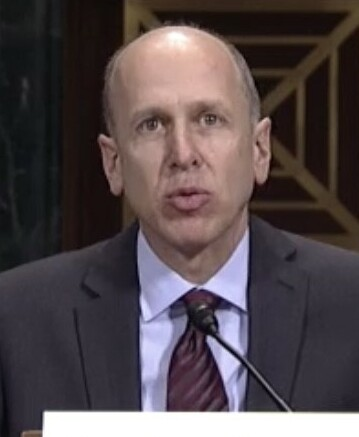
- Sorokin in 2014

Judge of the United States District Court for the District of Massachusetts
- Incumbent
- Assumed office June 10, 2014
- Appointed by: Barack Obama
- Preceded by: Joseph L. Tauro

Chief Magistrate Judge of United States District Court for the District of Massachusetts
- In office 2012 – June 10, 2014

Magistrate Judge of the United States District Court for the District of Massachusetts
- In office April 11, 2005 – June 10, 2014

Personal details
- Born: 1961 (age 64–65) Hartford, Connecticut, U.S.
- Education: Yale University (BA); Columbia University (JD)

Leo Theodore Sorokin (born 1961) is a United States district judge of the United States District Court for the District of Massachusetts and former United States magistrate judge of the same court.

== Biography ==
Sorokin received a Bachelor of Arts degree, cum laude, in 1983 from Yale College. He received a Juris Doctor in 1991 from Columbia Law School. He served as a law clerk to Judge Rya W. Zobel of the United States District Court for the District of Massachusetts from 1991 to 1992. He worked in private practice at the law firm of Mintz, Levin, Cohn, Ferris, Glovsky and Popeo P.C., from 1992 to 1994.

From 1994 to 1996, he served in the Office of the Attorney General of Massachusetts as assistant attorney general and, from 1996 to 1997, as opinions coordinator in the same office. He served as an assistant federal public defender in Boston, from 1997 to 2005.

=== Federal judicial service ===
In 2005, he was appointed as a United States magistrate judge in the District of Massachusetts, becoming chief United States magistrate judge in 2012.

On December 19, 2013, President Barack Obama nominated Sorokin to serve as a United States district judge of the United States District Court for the District of Massachusetts, to the seat vacated by Judge Joseph L. Tauro, who assumed senior status on September 26, 2013. He received a hearing before the United States Senate Judiciary Committee on February 25, 2014. On March 27, 2014, his nomination was reported out of committee by a voice vote. On June 5, 2014, Senate Majority Leader Harry Reid filed for cloture on the nomination. On June 9, 2014, the United States Senate invoked cloture on his nomination by a 52–33 vote. On June 10, 2014, his nomination was confirmed by a 91–0 vote. He received his judicial commission on June 10, 2014.

In 2025, he ordered the U.S. government to provide 48 hours notice before deporting a doctor from Lebanon with a H1B visa who had returned to the U.S.

Legal offices
Preceded by Joseph L. Tauro	Judge of the United States District Court for the District of Massachusetts; 2014–present	Incumbent
