= Joseph L. Tauro =

American judge (1931–2018)

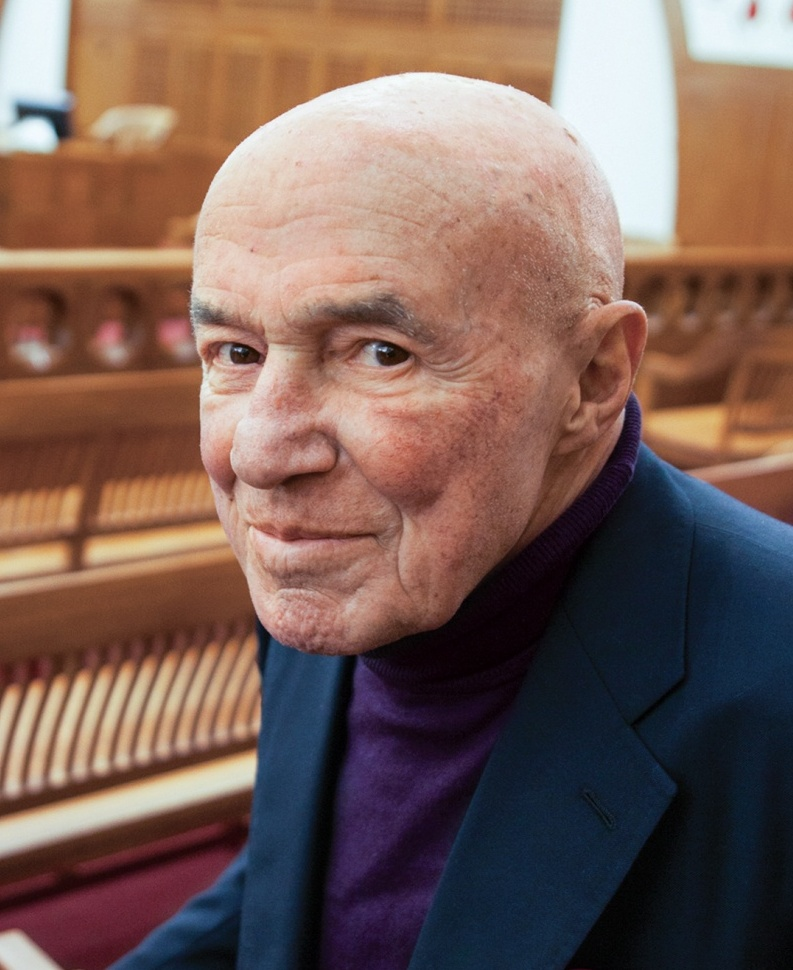
- Tauro in 2015

Senior Judge of the United States District Court for the District of Massachusetts
- In office September 26, 2013 – November 30, 2018

Chief Judge of the United States District Court for the District of Massachusetts
- In office 1992–1999
- Preceded by: Frank Harlan Freedman
- Succeeded by: William G. Young

Judge of the United States District Court for the District of Massachusetts
- In office October 17, 1972 – September 26, 2013
- Appointed by: Richard Nixon
- Preceded by: Francis Ford
- Succeeded by: Leo T. Sorokin

United States Attorney for the District of Massachusetts
- In office 1972
- Appointed by: Richard Nixon
- Preceded by: James N. Gabriel
- Succeeded by: James N. Gabriel

Personal details
- Born: Joseph Louis Tauro; September 26, 1931 Winchester, Massachusetts, U.S.
- Died: November 30, 2018 (aged 87) Marblehead, Massachusetts, U.S.
- Spouses: Elizabeth Quinlan (died 1978); June Jones (m. 1980)
- Children: 3
- Parent: G. Joseph Tauro (father)
- Education: Brown University (AB); Cornell University (LLB)

Joseph Louis Tauro (/ˈtɔːroʊ/; September 26, 1931 – November 30, 2018) was a United States district judge of the United States District Court for the District of Massachusetts. He was the son of the late Massachusetts Chief Justice G. Joseph Tauro.

== Education and career ==
Born in Winchester, Massachusetts, in 1931, Tauro received an Artium Baccalaureus degree from Brown University in 1953 and a Bachelor of Laws from Cornell Law School in 1956. He was a First Lieutenant in the United States Army from 1956 to 1958, and was an Assistant United States Attorney for the District of Massachusetts from 1959 to 1960. He was in private practice in Boston and Lynn, Massachusetts from 1960 to 1971. He was a chief legal counsel to the Governor of Massachusetts, John A. Volpe, from 1965 to 1968. He was the United States Attorney for the District of Massachusetts in 1972.

== Federal judicial service ==
On September 12, 1972, Tauro was nominated by President Richard Nixon to a seat on the United States District Court for the District of Massachusetts vacated by Judge Francis Ford. Tauro was confirmed by the United States Senate on October 12, 1972, and received his commission on October 17, 1972. He served as Chief Judge from 1992 to 1999. Tauro took senior status effective September 26, 2013, retaining approximately a 60% caseload with a focus on criminal cases. Before taking senior status, Tauro was the last active judge appointed to his position by Nixon. (Note: Gerald Bard Tjoflat, appointed by Nixon to the Middle District of Florida in 1970, would be appointed by Ford to an appellate seat in 1975 and remain in active service until 2019, six years after Tauro took senior status.)

== Notable cases ==
On July 8, 2010, in the cases of Gill v. Office of Personnel Management and Massachusetts v. United States Department of Health and Human Services, Tauro issued decisions holding unconstitutional that part of the federal Defense of Marriage Act that defined marriage "as a legal union exclusively between one man and one woman." Those decisions were affirmed by the United States Court of Appeals for the First Circuit, and certiorari was denied after the Supreme Court issued its opinion in United States v. Windsor. In a lawsuit under NEPA involving possible radiations dangers from the original 1978 Pave Paws on Cape Cod he offered the plaintiffs a guided tour of the facility so they could see for themselves how "safe" it was.

== Personal life and death ==
Tauro and his first wife, Elizabeth Quinlan, had three children; she died in 1978. Two years later, he married June Jones. Tauro died from primary myelofibrosis at his home in Marblehead, Massachusetts, on November 30, 2018, aged 87.

== See also ==
- List of United States federal judges by longevity of service

== Sources ==
- Gill v. OPM, 1:09-cv-10309-JLT, (D.Mass. July 8, 2010), at 38. Available at online
- Mass. v. US Dept. Available online

Legal offices
Preceded by Francis Ford	Judge of the United States District Court for the District of Massachusetts; 1972–2013	Succeeded by Leo T. Sorokin
Preceded by Frank Harlan Freedman	Chief Judge of the United States District Court for the District of Massachusetts; 1992–1999	Succeeded by William G. Young
