= Calvin O. Butts =

American pastor (1949–2022)

The Reverend Calvin O. Butts
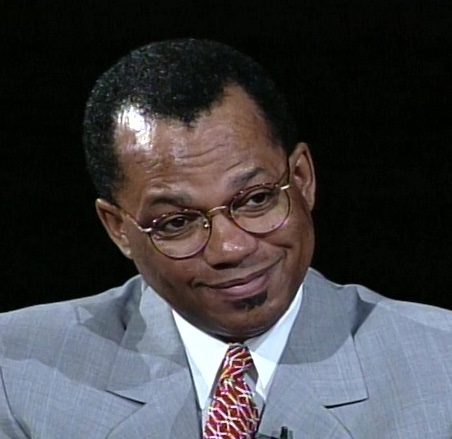
- Butts on CUNY TV's Urban Agenda (1996)

President of the State University of New York at Old Westbury
- In office 1999–2020

Personal details
- Born: Calvin Otis Butts III; July 19, 1949 Bridgeport, Connecticut, U.S.
- Died: October 28, 2022 (aged 73) Harlem, New York, U.S.
- Spouse: Patricia Butts
- Education: Morehouse College (BA); Union Theological Seminary (MDiv); Drew University (DMin)
- Profession: Pastor

Calvin Otis Butts III (July 19, 1949 – October 28, 2022) was an American academic administrator and a senior pastor of the Abyssinian Baptist Church, which historically was the largest black church in New York City. He led the Abyssinian Development Corporation, which focuses on Harlem, and was president of the State University of New York College at Old Westbury.

== Early life and education ==
Calvin Butts III was born in Bridgeport, Connecticut, on July 19, 1949. His father, Calvin Otis Butts II, worked as a cook and butcher; his mother, Eloise (Edwards), was employed as a supervisor for the New York City welfare department. Soon, the family moved to Queens, where he attended public schools. He spent summers in rural Georgia with his grandmothers.

Elected president of his senior class, Butts graduated from Flushing High School in 1967. He was awarded a partial scholarship to study at Morehouse College, where he joined the Kappa Alpha Psi fraternity. There, he earned a Bachelor of Arts in philosophy. After returning to New York, he earned from Union Theological Seminary a Master of Divinity in church history, and from Drew University a Doctor of Ministry in church and public policy.

== Career ==
Butts joined the Abyssinian Baptist Church in Harlem, traditionally New York City's largest and preeminent black church, as a youth minister in 1972. For decades its senior pastor, he also delivered a weekly sermon by radio on a local station, 98.7 FM (KISS-FM).

During the late 1980s, Butts offered an early endorsement of the Harlem Week of Prayer, organized by Pernessa C. Seele, and helped mobilize the religious community to support programs for AIDS patients and their families.

Butts founded the Abyssinian Development Corporation (ADC) in 1989, which he later chaired. The corporation is an arm of the church that undertook community projects, including the first high school constructed in Harlem in half a century, as well as several of the first national retail chain stores in the area. The ADC also oversaw the construction of one of Harlem's first new full-service supermarkets, a department store, and a shopping center. It went on to own more than 1,100 rental units, which were leased almost exclusively for low-income residents.

In 1995, Governor George Pataki appointed Butts to two of New York state's economic development boards – the Empire State Development Corporation and the New York State Science and Technology Foundation – both of which controlled loans and grants to businesses.

In 2003, Butts ordained Conrad Tillard, who became a preacher at the Abyssinian Baptist Church.

From 1999 to 2020, Butts was the president of the State University of New York at Old Westbury. In turn, Butts received honorary degrees from a number of colleges, including the City College of New York, Claflin College, Dillard University, Hartwick College, Muhlenberg College, Trinity College, Fordham University, and Tuskegee University.

== Personal life and death ==
Butts was married to Patricia Reed Butts, who founded the health ministry at her husband's church, until his death. They had three children and six grandchildren.

Butts died of pancreatic cancer on October 28, 2022, at his home in Harlem, at the age of 73.

== In popular culture ==
One of Butts's sermons inveighing against hardcore rap music was ironically sampled by the group Bone Thugs-n-Harmony in their 1994 hit song "Thuggish Ruggish Bone".
