= Francis Ford (judge) =

American judge (1882–1975)

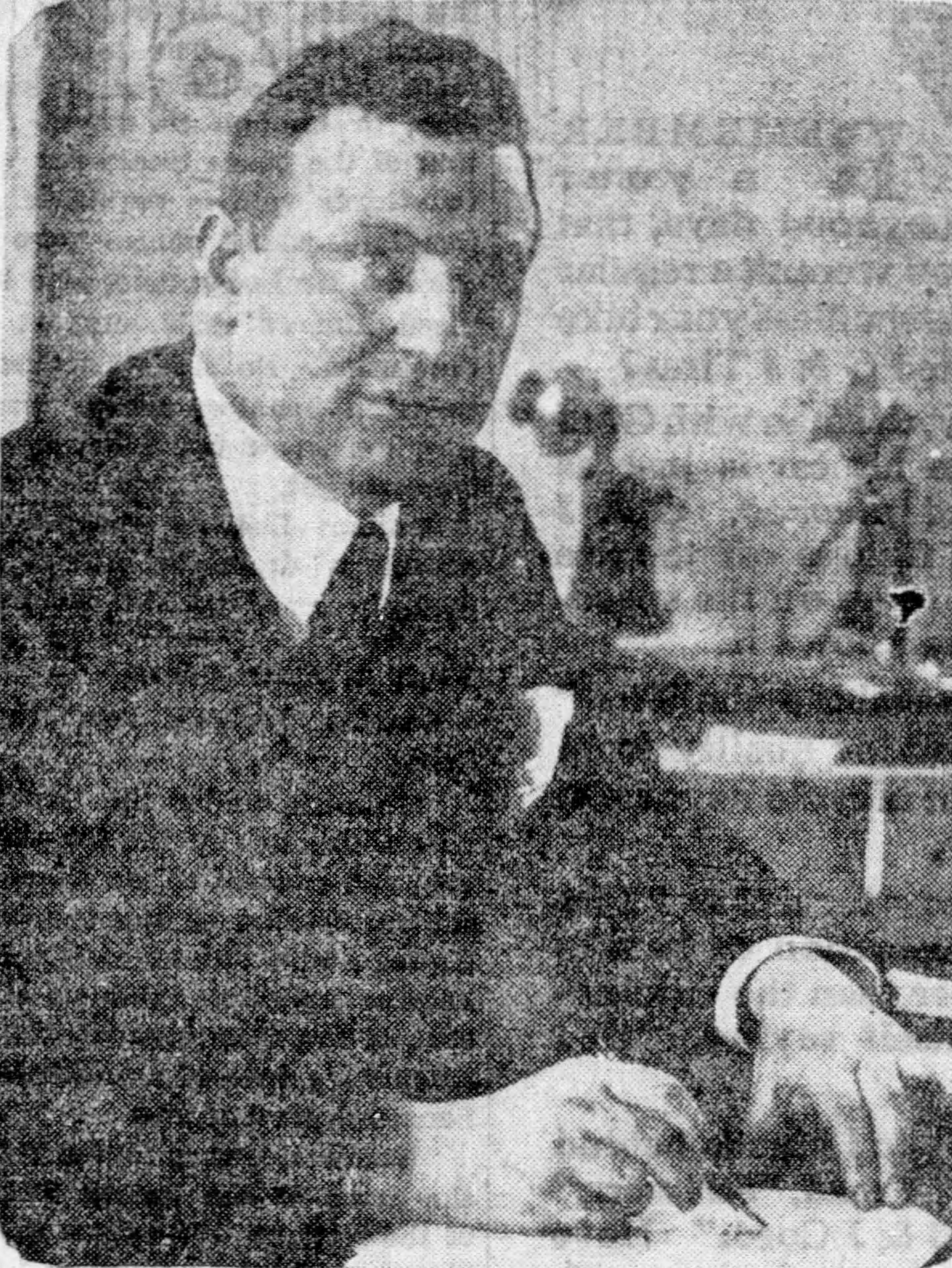
- Ford, circa 1919

Senior Judge of the United States District Court for the District of Massachusetts
- In office July 1, 1972 – May 26, 1975

Judge of the United States District Court for the District of Massachusetts
- In office June 24, 1938 – July 1, 1972
- Appointed by: Franklin D. Roosevelt
- Preceded by: Seat established by 52 Stat. 584
- Succeeded by: Joseph L. Tauro

United States Attorney for the District of Massachusetts
- In office 1933–1938
- Appointed by: Franklin D. Roosevelt
- Preceded by: Frederick H. Tarr
- Succeeded by: John A. Canavan

President of the Boston City Council
- In office 1919
- Preceded by: Walter L. Collins
- Succeeded by: James T. Moriarty

Member of the Boston City Council
- In office 1917–1922

Personal details
- Born: Francis Joseph William Ford; December 23, 1882 Boston, Massachusetts
- Died: May 26, 1975 (aged 92) Boston, Massachusetts
- Education: Harvard University (A.B.); Harvard Law School (LL.B.)

Francis Joseph William Ford (December 23, 1882 – May 26, 1975) was a United States district judge of the United States District Court for the District of Massachusetts.

== Early life and career ==
Born in Boston, Massachusetts, Ford spent his childhood in South Boston and attended the Boston Latin School. He received an Artium Baccalaureus degree from Harvard University in 1904, where he met Franklin D. Roosevelt. He graduated from Harvard Law School in 1906 but did not receive his Bachelor of Laws until 1907 due to the fact that he could not afford the $20 diploma cost. He was in private practice of law in Boston from 1906 to 1933. He was a member of the Boston City Council from 1917 to 1922. He was appointed as the United States Attorney for the District of Massachusetts by President Roosevelt, serving from 1933 to 1938. Ford unsuccessfully ran for District Attorney of Suffolk County, Massachusetts.

== United States Attorney ==
Ford was particularly alarmed at the growing rate of marijuana use among Boston teenagers. Ford, along with Boston Police Commissioner Joseph Timilty, created a campaign with the Federal Narcotics Bureau to "nip the evil flower of marijuana in the bud." This was primarily the result of an incident in South Boston during which teenagers fired at police while apparently under the influence of marijuana. The teens had just come from a "tea party" in South Boston, which at the time referred to a party at which marijuana was smoked.

As United States Attorney, Ford successfully prosecuted two mail-robbers in U.S. v. Rettich which was upheld on appeal. In this case, the defendants were found guilty of both conspiracy to assault a mail truck driver and robbing the driver of United States mail. They were also indicted and found guilty for assaulting the truck driver with a dangerous weapon, thus "effecting a robbery of said registered mail." The defendants' main argument was that the trial court erred in allowing certain evidence ($10,000 found buried in Rettich's yard) because it was obtained through illegal search and seizure. The court wrote that "evidence secured even by an unlawful search and seizure by state officers, when not acting in behalf of the federal government, is admissible in a prosecution for a federal offense in the United States Courts, whether seized under an invalid search warrant or without any warrant at all."

== Federal judicial service ==
Ford was nominated by President Franklin D. Roosevelt on June 9, 1938, to the United States District Court for the District of Massachusetts, to a new seat created by 52 Stat. 584. He was confirmed by the United States Senate on June 15, 1938, and received his commission on June 24, 1938. He served as a member of the Judicial Conference of the United States from 1961 to 1967. He assumed senior status on July 1, 1972. His service was terminated on May 26, 1975, due to his death in Boston.

== Dr. Spock trial ==
Ford presided over the 1968 trial of childcare specialist and anti-Vietnam War activist Benjamin Spock ("Dr. Spock"), William Sloane Coffin (the chaplain of Yale University) Michael Ferber, Mitchell Goodman, and Marcus Raskin. The group of anti-Vietnam War activists became known as "the Boston Five." In this case the defendants were indicted with conspiring to "counsel, aid and abet diverse Selective Service registrants to neglect, fail, refuse and evade service in the armed forces of the United States and all other duties required of registrants under the Universal Military Training and Service Act, to fail and refuse to have in their personal possession at all times their registration certificates (and) valid notices of classification (and conspired to) unlawfully, willfully and knowingly hinder and interfere, by any means, with the administration of the Universal Military Training and Service Action." Essentially, they were charged with conspiring to aid and abet draft dodgers. The jury found the defendants guilty of violating the Selective Service Act of 1948.

The jury found the defendants guilty of conspiracy in large part due to special questions submitted by Ford to the jury. He also informed the jury that the legality of the Vietnam War was not a relevant issue. Following the trial, Dr. Spock stated that "Ford was not going to listen to any arguments that the government was wrong about the war." Spock also later stated that a friend of his, when leaving the courtroom, overheard Ford say, "They brought a bunch of slick New York lawyers to try to interfere with justice here, but they're not going to do it." Among the questions Ford submitted was the following:

Does the Jury find beyond a reasonable doubt that defendants unlawfully, knowingly and willfully conspired to counsel Selective Service registrants to knowingly and willfully refuse and evade service in the armed forces of the United States in violation of Section 12 of the Military Selective Service Act of 1967? (Id. at 180).

The second question substituted the word 'counsel' for 'aid' while the third question substituted the word 'counsel' with 'abet'. The jury returned a verdict of guilty, while answering most of the special questions in the government's favor. When Ford sentenced the defendants to two years in prison he stated, "Rebellion against the law is in the nature of treason." His verdict was overturned by the First Circuit Court of Appeals. The Court held that Ford had committed prejudicial error by submitting the ten special questions to the jury.

There was widespread criticism of Ford following the Spock trial. Howard Zinn, in his book Disobedience and Democracy: Nine Fallacies of Law and Order wrote, "In sentencing Dr. Spock, William Coffin, Michael Ferber, and Mitchell Goodman to jail terms on July 10, 1968, Judge Francis Ford in Boston quoted Justice Fortas that 'Lawlessness cannot be tolerated,' and added his own words: 'Where law and order stops, obviously anarchy begins.'" Zinn continued, "That is the same basically conservative impulse which once saw minimum wage laws as leading to socialism, or bus desegregation leading to intermarriage…."

== Personal life ==
Ford married Anna Creswell and they had one daughter.

== See also ==
- List of United States federal judges by longevity of service

Legal offices
Preceded by Seat established by 52 Stat. 584	Judge of the United States District Court for the District of Massachusetts; 1938–1972	Succeeded by Joseph L. Tauro
