= Die Seele =

1914 book by Joseph Geyser

Die Seele: Ihr Verhältnis zum Bewusstsein und zum Leibe (English: The soul: its relation to consciousness and body) is a book by the German philosopher and psychologist Joseph Geyser was published in the journal "Wissen und Forschen (Schriften zur Einführung in die Philosophy, Band 6)" in 1914.

With Die Seele Geyser aims to clarify the specific processes of the soul and its relation to our consciousness and body thereby discussing the Mind–body problem and different positions such as Materialism or parallelism. Finally, Geyser concludes with an interactionist position ("Wechselwirkung") between mind and body.

== Historical context ==
Joseph Geyser (1869–1948) received his doctorate in philosophy from the University of Bonn in 1898. Later, he was teaching at the University of Münster (1904), the University of Freiburg (1917) and the Ludwig-Maximilians-Universität München (1924). As a supporter of the philosophia perennis he aims at answering questions in an objective, critical and realistic manner while being independent of the temporary situation:

Geyser held that answers to philosophical questions must be based on direct contact with a real actuality, understood in the Aristotelian sense, as an entity independent of consciousness, and not on the creative activity of an idealistic, theoretical thought. Only thus can we stand on firm ground

—

At the time, the pressing question as formulated in Psychological Bulletin at the beginning of 1914 was: "Is psychology purely a study of behaviour, or is it solely a study of mental states and processes, or does its problem lead to research in both fields?" In Die Seele (1914) Geyser himself claims to fit the Zeitgeist of philosophy and psychology at the beginning of the 20th century to focus not on basic but higher conscious processes. His work is written and published at a time where psychology was in its early shoes. On the one hand, the first experimental psychology lab in Leipzig, Germany, has been opened in 1879 by Wilhelm Wundt. During the period of 1970–1914 in Germany and America, psychology has been transformed into an experimental psychology. In this period many mental phenomena started to be investigated in an empirical fashion. Especially visual and spatial perception has been a centre of attention with phenomena such as binocular stereopsis (3D and depth perception) and colour blindness. These developments slowly replaced more traditional associationist psychology which regarded psychology as a science of purely mental phenomena. On the other hand, in parallel to the experimental movement, Sigmund Freud and his publications in psychoanalysis entered the field of psychology. Wundt is seen as a representative of a dual psychology, i.e. dealing with an "experimental psychology of elementary psychic phenomena", as seen in Wundt's physiological psychology and a "non-experimental psychology of higher psychic phenomena" as seen in Wundt's nonexperimental "ethnopsychology" ("Völkerpsychologie"). In Germany as well as in the United States, the "new psychology" in contrast to the old, metaphysical psychology, emerged, usually dated as by 1914.

This development is also reflected by James Watson's publication of Psychology as the Behaviorist Views it, marking the beginning of Behaviourism. One year prior to Die Seele by Geyser, 1913, this work formulates the behaviourist viewpoint from which the discipline of psychology is seen as a purely objective experimental branch of natural science, disregarding introspection and the study of consciousness.

Geyser, combining empirical psychology and philosophical psychology, appreciated experimental results and the Würzburg School. Oswald Külpe, former student of Wundt, associated with the Würzburg School, extended under criticism of Wundt experimental psychology to higher cognitive and mental processes. Geyser's work is influenced by the dual psychology of Wilhelm Wundt which in contrast to the emerging behaviourism does not completely disregard the metaphysical aspects of consciousness, Oswald Külpe and the Würzburg School. While Wundt supports the psychophysical parallelism, stating that mental and physical phenomena form two distinct, parallel existing realms, Geyser closes Die Seele with a more interactionist position of the mind–body problem.

=== Influence on Die Seele ===
With Die Seele (1914) Geyser himself says to fit the Zeitgeist of philosophy and psychology at the beginning of the 20th century to focus not on basic but higher conscious processes and examines the role of our soul and consciousness as he describes it in his preamble. As Geyser further points out, Metaphysics is inevitable in the question of consciousness, but influenced by Wilhelm Wundt and Experimental psychology the has the opinion to limit metaphysics to an amount only necessary for the human logical need to understand. Further Geyser's work complies with Oswald Külpe's (doctoral student and assistant of Wundt) urge to not completely separate psychology and philosophy since they mutually depend on each other.

Die Seele is one of Geyser's earlier and more unknown works and is described as an outsourced summary of the specific parts about the soul of the earlier work "Lehrbuch der allgemeinen Psychologie" (1912). This work integrates into the research interest of the time to clarify general philosophical and psychological concepts as can be seen in contemporary works such as Natorps "Allgemeine Psychologie nach kritischer Methode" (1912).

=== Influence of logic in Geyser's work ===
Later works of Geyser include "Grundlegung der Logik und Erkenntnistheorie" (English: Basics of Logic and Epistemology; 1919) and "Auf dem Kampffelde der Logik" (English: On the battlefield of logic; 1926) and his strong background in Logic is already noticeable throughout Geyser's earlier work Die Seele. Arguments of other philosophers are decomposed and analysed such as Paul Natorp's argument which contains the fallacy petitio principii.

== Reception ==
Today Joseph Geyser is rather unknown, but that Joseph Geyser's work was relevant and valued at the time can be seen in the commemorative publication "Philosophia Perennis. Abhandlungen zu ihrer Vergangenheit und Gegenwart" by Fritz-Joachim von Rintelen in honour of the sixtieth birthday anniversary of Geyser. In more than 1000 pages this commemorative publication combines articles of various contemporary scholars at the time such as Étienne Gilson, Jacques Maritain, Reginald Garrigou-Lagrange, Martin Grabmann, Joseph Maréchal, Peter Wust, Antonin Sertillanges, Richard Hönigswald and Dietrich von Hildebrand. Max Ettlinger's (1877–1929) article deals with Joseph Geyser as a Psychologist. Ettlinger points out that Geyser's philosophy and psychology developed through intense exchange within the circle of students at the Ludwig-Maximilians-Universität München under the "inspiring teacher" Theodor Lipps. Lipps is described as developing from earlier positions such as Psychologism to metaphysics of mind whereby the latter was congenial to Geyser view.

Valued by the German philosopher Nicolai Hartmann, who was also a supporter of the philosophia perennis and critical realism, Geyser is described as having a "consistently thought-out and complete worldview" which was developed within his Christian belief.

Geyser further called attention through his discussion of the causality principle. In his Das Prinzip vom zureichenden Grunde (English: The principle of sufficient reason; Ratisbon, 1929) and in Das Gesetz der Ursache (English: The law of cause; Freiburg, 1933) he develops the idea that we can only discover the meaning of causality through experience. He questions whether his principle of causation is a priori. This question is highly "significant for any further epistemological and metaphysical construction that is in accord with experience".

== Content ==
The book comprises an introduction and six main chapters with several sub-chapters in order to clarify the concept of the soul and its relation to our consciousness and body.

=== Preamble and Introduction ===
While the naive person regards the soul as a homogeneous entity being the "Wurzel, Zuschauer und Täter der mannigfaltigen Vorgänge im geistig Inneren" (English: root, the observer and an actor of various processes in our inner world), Geyser points out that many psychologists doubt this simple view. A consistent name for the sum of all inner, mental processes suggests that there is a soul that feels and thinks, but usually, psychologists regard this view scientifically wrong. Geyser states that his book aims to fill the academic gap between theory and practice by clarifying the concept of "the soul". Either the concept of a soul that is used by the layperson should be scientifically justified or should be abandoned completely.

=== I. First chapter: The mental facts of experience and the concept of consciousness ===
The first chapter introduces the problem of separating mental and bodily states as well as separating psychology and natural sciences. Classically, natural sciences like chemistry and physics were seen as dealing with experiences through sensory organs while psychology deals with everything else, like emotional states. However, Geyser states that the same object e.g. colours can be subject to both research streams:

Deshalb sind die unmittelbar wahrgenommen Sinnesinhalte zwar, wenn wir auf ihr Dasein sehen, etwas Seelisches. Sie verdanken aber ihr Dasein, ihre Beschaffenheit und ihre Beziehungen in erster Linie nicht der Seele, sondern den Realen der Natur. Man hat darum die Sinnesobjecte als eine Resultante aus seelischen und nicht seelischen Ursachen und Vorgängen aufzufassen

—

Therefore, everything we perceive is a result of mental as well as non-mental causes and processes, thereby Geyser opposes pure Idealism. The mental ("Seelisches") is defined as the act of perception and the content of perception. Geyser refers to Max Plancks' notion that perceptions can only give us a hint of the reality but may not depict the reality itself. The chapter concludes with the notions that the act of perceiving accompanies every sensory experience turning it in a psychological experience.

=== II. Second chapter: The knowledge about the soul out of its existence and characteristics of consciousness ===
The second chapter examines how we can know that the soul exists by knowing that we are conscious. One sub-chapter deals with Immanuel Kant's ideas and Transcendental idealism. In another subchapter, Geyser argues against Paul Natorp by stating that our knowledge of our consciousness ("Bewusstsein") implies that we are conscious of it. This paves the way for Geysers' metaphysics of mind. The chapter concludes that we know that the various processes in our consciousness ("Bewusstseinsfeld") exist in the subject that experiences them ("Bewusstsein").

=== III. Third chapter: general organisation of consciousness ===
After defining the terminology of the soul and consciousness several sub-chapter examine the organisation of our consciousness in greater detail.

1. The duration of the soul: Is the momentary subject of perception the same as yesterday? Geyser argues it is because we remember and have the ability to "re-cognize".
2. The passivity of the soul: Geyser argues that assuming that our senses are simply stimulated by physical processes and the conscious perception is simply passive as described in Associationism is not enough to understand the nature of the soul. In his opinion, the active part of the soul is what leads to a qualitative character of every perception.
3. The reactivity of the soul
4. The activity of the soul while thinking
5. The activity of the soul and free will: Deterministic and Indeterministic viewpoints are discussed. However, Geyser concludes that we have a will and that despite influencing motives and tendencies we have the willpower to consciously choose the opposite, given enough consideration time. He gives the example of picking a card.

=== IV. Fourth chapter: The problem of the unconscious. Being aware, noticing, observing. Real-definitions of the human soul ===
The unconscious nature of certain processes is discussed whereby several sub-chapters examine different processes such as being aware, noticing and observing and its unconscious parts. Geyser distances his work from Freud's psychoanalytical view of the unconscious.

=== V. Fifth chapter: Rejection of the denial of the soul by materialism ===
The materialism denies that there is a mental part, a soul. Geyser discusses the different form of materialism in the light of Naïve realism (psychology) and Critical realism (philosophy of perception).

=== VI. Sixth chapter: The nature of the dependence of mental and bodily processes ===
The mind–body problem is introduced with the question whether there are two separate substances, namely the mental (soul) and the physical (body) and if so, whether and how those two substances interact. Geyser opposes René Descartes who stated the problems of Interactionism (philosophy of mind). The chapter discusses arguments against the notion that substances who interact have to be the same substance. Usually the strong argument against some sort of dualism is the law of conservation of energy argument, however, Geyser rather quickly refutes it. He supports his opinion by referring to Erich Becher and his work on "Leben und Seele" (1912) who argues that interaction ("Wechselwirkung") is not incompatible with results of Rubner, Laulanie and Atwater regarding conservation of energy. Subsequently, the position of Parallelism (philosophy) is discussed and denied.

Finally, Geysers concludes that there must be an interaction ("Wechselwirkung") between mental and physical, as can be seen by the fact that we do not just think but also speak and write about our thoughts with the aim to influence other peoples thoughts and decisions:

Denn warum begnügen wir uns nicht mit unseren Gedanken? Warum sprechen und schreiben wir? Doch aus keinem anderen Grunde und Zwecke als dazu, damit undere Gedanken durch diese Vermittlung der körperlichen Natur zum Bewusstsein der übrigen Menschen dringen und dort Gedanken und Enschlüsse wecken

—

== Bibliography ==
- Geyser, Joseph (1914). Die Seele: Ihr Verhältnis zum Bewusstsein und zum Leibe. Leipzig: Felix Meiner Verlag: Wissen und Forschen.
- M. Ettlinger: Joseph Geyser als Psychologe, in: Philosophia Perennis, Band 2, 1930, pp. 1131–1140
