= Preston Washington =

American Baptist minister (1948–2003)

- Reverend
- Church: Memorial Baptist Church
- Metropolis: Harlem, New York
- Appointed: 1976
- Successor: Renee Frances Washington

Personal details
- Born: Preston Robert Washington; August 26, 1948 Manhattan, New York, U.S.
- Died: June 25, 2003 (aged 54) Manhattan, New York, U.S.
- Denomination: Baptist
- Spouse: Rev. Renee F. Washington
- Occupation: minister
- Education: Williams College; Union Theological Seminary; Columbia University

Preston Robert Washington (August 26, 1948 – June 25, 2003) was a prominent minister of Memorial Baptist Church in Harlem, New York. He was a co-founder of the Harlem Congregations for Community Improvement and held leadership positions from 1986 to 2001, bringing millions of dollars in development projects for housing and retail to the neighborhood.

== Early life ==
Washington was born in Manhattan, New York. He grew up on 99th Street in Spanish Harlem and attended public schools. He then attended Williams College, graduating summa cum laude in 1970. While he was at Williams, he was a member of the social and literary fraternity St. Anthony Hall.

Next, attended Union Theological Seminary where he received a master of divinity. His masters thesis was The Paradox of Theological Education: A Third Way. He also received a doctorate in education from the Teacher's College at Columbia University. His Ed.D. dissertation was The Black Religious Imagination: A Theological and a Pedagogical Interpretation of the Afro-American Sermon in the Twentieth Century.

== Career ==
In 1976, Washington became a senior pastor at Memorial Baptist Church in Harlem, New York, serving there until he died in 2003. The congregation grew to 1,500 people under his leadership. The church became a popular stop for politicians.

In 1986 with Canon Frederick B. Williams, Washington co-founded the Harlem Congregations for Community Improvement (HCCI), a consortium of 90 congregations that developed housing and retail services. He served as the president and CEO of HCCI. HCCI helped start a revival in Harlem during the difficult years of the 1980s and early 1990s. HCCI spent $200 million in the Bradhurst section of Harlem, developing 1,300 housing units. Part of this was House of Hope which built houses for homeless single parents and their children. HCCI also established thirty retail stores in Harlem.

HCCI spent $1.7 million, supporting programs for housing for people with HIV/AIDS, as well as education and prevention of HIV/AIDS. Washington said, "'What kind of damn God is this that allows this damn stuff? Babies dying of AIDS?'' I have to constantly check my own faith because this disease threatens every aspect of faith."

Washington encouraged his congregation to welcome tourists who arrived by busloads to hear gospel music. These tourists made contributions that helped renovate the church. Washington even organized the church service so that his preaching would take place after the tourists, many who did not speak English, had left. In 1996 he told NPR that "members joked that the church was a European church on Sunday morning and a clandestine black church at nights during the week."

Washington also pushed the role of a church into managing three parks and a jobs skills training program. In 1997, he told Mother Jones magazine, ''We want to get beyond soup kitchens and care packages."

He also preached in China, Cuba, and South Korea. He served on the board of the Black Leadership Commission on AIDS, the Boys Choir of Harlem, and the Consortium for Central Harlem Development.

== Publications ==
- From the Pew to the Pavement: Messages on Urban Outreach (Aaron Press, 1986) ISBN 978-0942683004
- God's Transforming Spirit: Black Church Renewal (Judson Press, 1988) ISBN 978-0817011291

== Honors ==
- In Washington's honor, New York City named W.115th Street, where Memorial Baptist Church is located, Bishop Preston R. Washington Sr. Place.
- Washington received a Bicentennial Medal from Williams College.
- In 2001, Washington played himself on Emeril, a situation comedy on NBC.

== Personal life ==
He married Renee Frances Washington who also became a minister and assisted at Memorial Baptist Church. They had five sons together: Brandon, Devon, Jamel, Nicholas, and Preston Jr. They also had two adopted sons: Keith Gay and Jonathan R. Staples. They lived in New Rochelle, New York.

In 2003, Washington died at the Medical Center in Manhattan of heart failure at the age of 54 years.

In 2004, Rev. Renee Washington was elected to succeed Washington as senior minister of Memorial Baptist Church.
