= Julia Kobick =

American judge (born 1983)

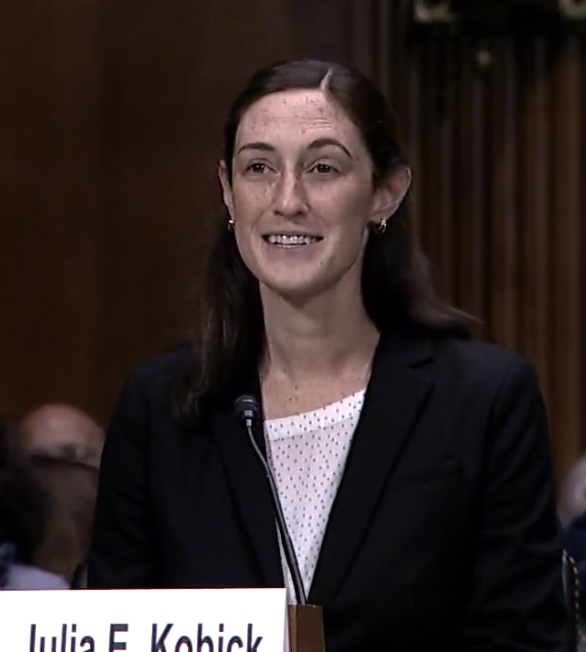

Judge of the United States District Court for the District of Massachusetts
- Incumbent
- Assumed office November 13, 2023
- Appointed by: Joe Biden
- Preceded by: William G. Young

Personal details
- Born: Julia Eleanor Kobick; 1983 (age 42–43) Boston, Massachusetts, U.S.
- Education: Harvard University (BA, JD)

Julia Eleanor Kobick (born 1983) is an American lawyer who is serving as a United States district judge of the United States District Court for the District of Massachusetts since 2023. She previously served as deputy state solicitor in the Office of the Massachusetts Attorney General.

== Education ==
Kobick earned a Bachelor of Arts, cum laude, from Harvard University in 2005 and a Juris Doctor, magna cum laude, from Harvard Law School in 2010.

== Career ==
From 2005 to 2007, Kobick was a second and third grade teacher at P.S. 86, Kingsbridge Heights Elementary School; during the same period she was a corps members with Teach For America. From 2007 to 2011, she was a resident tutor at Cabot House. She served as a summer associate during the summer of 2009 with Hogan Lovells. Kobick served as a law clerk for Judge F. Dennis Saylor IV of the United States District Court for the District of Massachusetts from 2010 to 2011, for Judge Michael Chagares of the United States Court of Appeals for the Third Circuit from 2011 to 2012, and for Associate Justice Ruth Bader Ginsburg of the United States Supreme Court from 2012 to 2013. From 2013 to 2021, she served as a deputy attorney general in the Office of the Massachusetts Attorney General. She became deputy state solicitor, the state's title for the deputy solicitor general, in 2021 and left in 2023 to become a federal judge.

=== Notable cases ===
In 2017, Kobick was part of the legal team that sued the Trump administration for its rollback of the Affordable Care Act's contraceptive coverage mandate.

In 2022, Kobick defended Massachusetts' mask mandate during the COVID-19 pandemic.

In 2022, Kobick was part of the legal team defending Massachusetts' "right to repair" law. The law mandated access to car diagnostic and repair systems.

In November 2026, Kobick issued a nationwide injunction enjoining enforcement of the United States Department of Homeland Security's rule sharply limiting the use of Curricular Practical Training by international students on F visas.

=== Federal judicial service ===
On July 29, 2022, President Joe Biden announced his intent to nominate Kobick to serve as a United States district judge of the United States District Court for the District of Massachusetts. On August 1, 2022, her nomination was sent to the Senate. President Biden nominated Kobick to the seat vacated by Judge William G. Young, who assumed senior status on July 1, 2021. On November 30, 2022, a hearing on her nomination was held before the Senate Judiciary Committee. During her hearing, she was repeatedly questioned by Senator Josh Hawley about an argument she made before the Supreme Court, claiming the Second Amendment did not apply to stun guns because they did not exist when the Amendment was written; an argument which had previously been rejected unanimously by the Court, and which the Court again rejected when she made it. On January 3, 2023, her nomination was returned to the President under Rule XXXI, Paragraph 6 of the United States Senate. She was renominated on January 23, 2023. On February 9, 2023, her nomination was reported out of committee by an 11–10 vote. On November 7, 2023, the Senate invoked cloture on her nomination by a 52–46 vote, with Senator Joe Manchin voting against the motion to invoke cloture on her nomination. Later that day, Kobick was confirmed by a 52–46 vote, with Senator Manchin voting against confirmation. Kobick's confirmation made her the 150th judge confirmed during the Biden presidency. She received her judicial commission on November 13, 2023.

== See also ==
- List of law clerks for the sixth seat of the Supreme Court of the United States

Legal offices
Preceded by William G. Young	Judge of the United States District Court for the District of Massachusetts; 2023–present	Incumbent
