= Pernessa C. Seele =

American immunologist (born 1954)

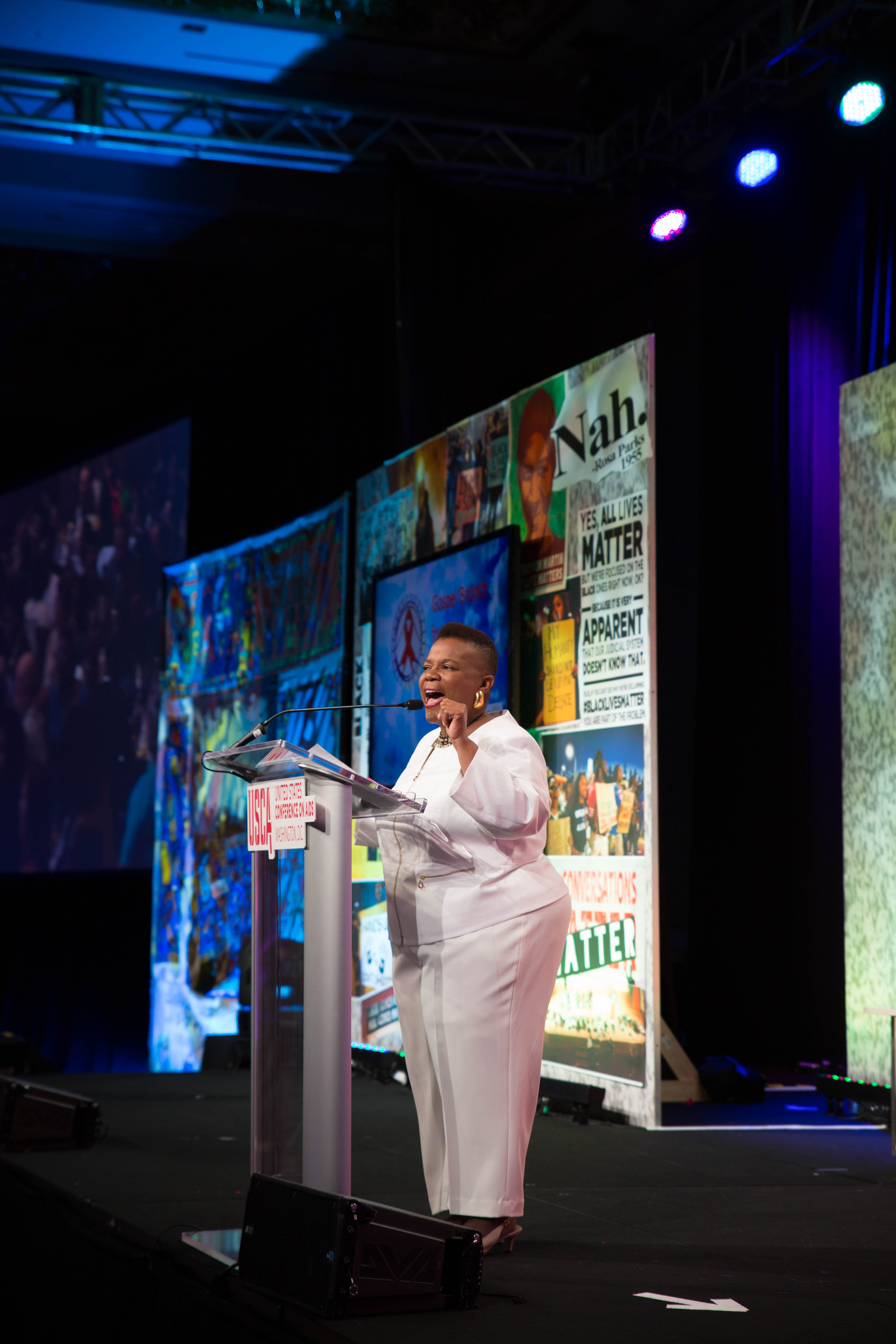
- Seele in 2015
- Born: October 15, 1954 (age 72); Lincolnville, South Carolina, U.S.
- Occupations: Immunlologist, Activist, CEO

Pernessa C. Seele (born October 15, 1954) is an American immunologist and interfaith public health activist. Seele is the CEO and founder of Balm in Gilead, Inc., a religious-based organization that provides support to people with AIDS and their families, as well as working for prevention of HIV and AIDS. In 1989, she initiated the Harlem Week of Prayer, with 50 churches, synagogues and mosques participating. This became an annual event and organizing force for the religious community to respond to the AIDS crisis.

Seele incorporated a growing organization as "The Balm in Gilead, Inc." This national movement to address public-health issues through communities of faith" has grown to include more than ten thousand churches, and numerous branches in the United States, Africa and the Caribbean. After 30 years in New York, Seele and the organization are now based in Richmond, Virginia.

== Early life and education ==
Pernessa Seele was born to Luella and Charles Seele in Lincolnville, South Carolina, about 20 miles from Charleston. It was an all-black rural town, where religious revivals were part of the community fabric and a way to mobilize civic action.

Seele studied biology as an undergraduate at Clark College (now Clark Atlanta University) where she earned a B.S. In 1979 she earned a master's degree in immunology at Atlanta University. She went to New York to start a career in science research.

== Career ==
Seele went to New York to work at Rockefeller University in the immunology of malaria. Then she took a job at Sloan Kettering Memorial Hospital in cancer research. Still in her twenties, she moved out of that to do what she called "little jobs".

In the early 1980s, the biological mechanisms of AIDS were still unknown, but the medical community was becoming aware of an epidemic crisis. Seele felt called to use her immunology degree in a different way. Seele developed one of the first AIDS education programs, held at a methadone clinic. She worked at Harlem Hospital as an administrator in the AIDS Initiative Program. Confronted with the needs of patients and their families in the wards, she decided to try to organize the large Harlem religious community in their support.

Harlem religious communities at first associated the disease with downtown gay men.

Religious leaders like Frederick Williams and Preston Washington credit a fiery former immunologist, Pernessa C. Seele, for changing the way they see the disease. As an administrator at Harlem Hospital, Ms. Seele grew weary of watching dozens of patients die alone, without the spiritual support of their congregations.

In 1989, Seele met with leaders of 50 churches, mosques, and Ethiopian Hebrews, to ask them to come together in prayer and education, for the first Harlem Week of Prayer. Religious congregations were encouraged to include education programs on AIDS and its prevention, as well as to create support for patients and their families. Her leadership was supported by major religious leaders in Harlem: Dr. Preston Washington, Dr. Frederick B. Williams, Dr. Wyatt Tee Walker, Dr. Calvin O. Butts, Bishop Norman N. Quick, James A. Forbes, and numerous others.

By 1991, 100 congregations participated in the annual week of prayer, as the Harlem community came to realize that HIV/AIDS was their disease, too. The Harlem Week of Prayer and mobilization began to receive national attention. Seele was invited to churches and public health groups in other cities to speak about it.

Seele's effort to address public health issues through communities of faith received technical assistance and support from the federal government. She received funding from the Centers for Disease Control and Prevention (CDC) to expand the program to six pilot cities. The CDC recognized the potential of the movement to prevent HIV/AIDS and support patients. Seele incorporated the Balm in Gilead, Inc., to create an organization with non-profit status.

By 2003, the organization reached 10,000 churches, and 70 community organizations had been created to implement its programs in the United States, some African nations, and the Caribbean. Through a cooperative agreement with the CDC, the Balm in Gilead, Inc. operates the Black Church HIV/AIDS National Technical Assistance Center. For years CDC has provided funding and technical assistance to communities of faith to mobilize efforts in education and prevention of HIV/AIDS.

In 2004, Seele and her organization launched the African American Denominational Leadership Health Initiative. It was a partnership between the Balm In Gilead and the women's societies and councils of three Black religious denominations: the African Methodist Episcopal Church (AME), the African Methodist Episcopal Zion Church and the Christian Methodist Episcopal Church. It was designed to build the capacity of these denominations to address cervical cancer, HIV/AIDS and other health issues in Black communities.

== Legacy and honors (selected) ==
- 2006 - Seele was the guest of President George W. Bush and his wife for his fifth State of the Union address, in which he renewed the government's commitment to the fight against HIV/AIDS in the black community.
- 2006 - Time magazine listed her among the Top 100 Americans.
- 2008 - Seele was a featured speaker at the XVII International Conference on AIDS at Mexico City.
- 1996, Manhattan Borough, President Award
- 1997, Harlem United Community AIDS Center, Life Award
- 1997, State of Michigan, special tribute
- 1997, Community Works, Harlem Women Making a Difference Award
- 1998, Unity Fellowship Church, Bishop Carl Bean Visionary Award
