= Frederick B. Williams =

Frederick Boyd Williams (23 April 1939 – 4 April 2006) was a religious leader of national importance in the United States. As Canon of the Church of the Intercession in Harlem, New York from 1971 to 2005, he led an influential congregation, the first in the nation to establish a programmatic response to AIDS. A patron of the arts, he provided the first home for the Boys Choir of Harlem. He was a co-founder of the Harlem Congregations for Community Improvement (HCCI), which coordinated 90 congregations to develop 2000 units of housing and retail space. While earning a doctorate from Colgate Rochester Divinity School, he led a congregation that worked for civil rights and social justice, both in the United States and Africa.

== Early life and education ==
Born 23 April 1939 in Chattanooga, Tennessee, Williams grew up in the South. He earned a bachelor's degree at Morehouse College, a historically black college in Atlanta, Georgia. He earned a second bachelor's degree at General Theological Seminary in New York. Later he earned a doctorate from Colgate Rochester Divinity School.

== Career ==
Williams was one of a generation of activist ministers who were important in New York. He started as a parish priest in Washington, DC and Inkster, Michigan.

From 1971–2005, Williams led as Vicar and Rector at the Church of the Intercession, an Episcopal church in Harlem at the border of Washington Heights. His leadership brought the church to deal with new issues of the AIDS crisis, as well as longstanding issues in community development, social justice and international actions in Africa.

In 1985 Williams invited 50 black ministers to a conference about AIDS; only 15 came, showing people's reluctance then to deal with the disease. After that he led the church as the first in creating programs of outreach and pastoral care. He supported Pernessa C. Seele in 1989 as she launched the Harlem Week of Prayer with 50 churches, mosques and synagogues to support people with AIDS and their families. Williams became the chair of the National Clergy Advisory Committee of the Harlem Week of Prayer (the Balm in Gilead, Inc.) and served for 10 years. He served for 10 years. The Week of Prayer was developed around reaching out to people with AIDS and their families and friends.

Dr. Williams also led efforts for affordable housing and community development. In 1986 together with Dr. Preston Washington of Memorial Baptist Church, Williams co-founded and chaired the Harlem Congregations for Community Improvement, Inc. (HCCI). It grew to be a consortium of 90 congregations that developed nearly 2000 units of housing and 40 commercial spaces, including one of Harlem's first large supermarkets. In addition to putting together financing and development packages, the consortium established training for people in construction crafts and design.

Williams encouraged local arts groups, helping the Boys Choir of Harlem by allowing them to use the Church of the Intercession as their first performance space and base of operations. Williams led a variety of efforts for social justice; he was active in supporting African liberation and anti-apartheid efforts.

In 1988 with Rev. Dr. Wyatt Tee Walker of Canaan Baptist Church in Harlem, Williams co-founded the Religious Action Network (RAN) of the American Committee on Africa (ACOA) (since 2001 called Africa Action.) This was during the height of the anti-apartheid struggle in South Africa. Through his work, Williams became a friend of Bishop Desmond Tutu of South Africa, who sometimes officiated at the Church of the Intercession on his visits to the United States. RAN is a network of over 300 congregations throughout the U.S. that continues to provide prophetic witness to issues in Africa and to influence US policies toward nations there.

== Death ==
On 4 April 2006 Williams suffered a fatal heart attack. He was survived by a godson and several cousins.

== Legacy and honors ==
- Williams was named honorary canon of the cathedral in Gaborone, Botswana, for his support of African liberation movements.
- 2003 – The Episcopal Divinity School in Cambridge, Massachusetts established a prize in his name in pastoral theology.
- 2006 – Cong. Charles B. Rangel of New York read an appreciation of the life of Canon Williams into The Congressional Record.
