= Max Ettlinger =

German psychologist, philosopher, pedagogist, and aesthetician

Max Ettlinger (30 January 1877 in Frankfurt – 12 October 1929 in Munich) was a German psychologist, philosopher, pedagogist, and aesthetician.

== Literary works ==
- Ettlinger. 1905. Pierre Bonnier: Le sens du retour. Revue philos. 56 (7), 30–50. 1903. Zeitschrift für Psychologie und Physiologie der Sinnesorgane 38: 56
- Ettlinger. 1905. Gaston Rageot: Les formes simples de l'attention. Revue philos. 56 (8), 113–141. 1903. Zeitschrift für Psychologie und Physiologie der Sinnesorgane 38: 58–60
- Ettlinger. 1905. Henri Piéron: L'association médiate. Revue philos. 56 (8), 142–149. 1903. Zeitschrift für Psychologie und Physiologie der Sinnesorgane 38: 60
- Ettlinger. 1905. Gustave Loisel: La sexualité. Revue scient. 19 (22), 673–680. 1903. Zeitschrift für Psychologie und Physiologie der Sinnesorgane 38: 77
- Ettlinger. 1905. Marcel Mauxion: Les éléments et l'évolution de la moralité. Revue philosophique I u. II, 56 (7), 1-29; (8), 150–180. 1903. Zeitschrift für Psychologie und Physiologie der Sinnesorgane 38: 78–79
- Zimmer. 1905. Max Ettlinger: Untersuchungen über die Bedeutung der Deszendenztheorie für die Psychologie. Köln, Bachem. 1903. 86 S. Zeitschrift für Psychologie und Physiologie der Sinnesorgane 38: 321–322
- Philosophische Fragen der Gegenwart, 1925
- Beiträge zur Lehre von der Tierseele ind ihrer Entwicklung, 1925
- Wesen und Wert der Erziehungswissenschaft, 1929
