= William G. Young =

American federal judge (born 1940)

William Young
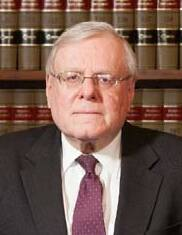
- Young c. 2010

Senior Judge of the United States District Court for the District of Massachusetts
- Incumbent
- Assumed office July 1, 2021

Chief Judge of the United States District Court for the District of Massachusetts
- In office 1999–2005
- Preceded by: Joseph L. Tauro
- Succeeded by: Mark L. Wolf

Judge of the United States District Court for the District of Massachusetts
- In office April 4, 1985 – July 1, 2021
- Appointed by: Ronald Reagan
- Preceded by: Seat established by 98 Stat. 333
- Succeeded by: Julia Kobick

Personal details
- Born: William Glover Young; September 23, 1940 (age 86) Huntington, New York, U.S.
- Education: Harvard University (BA, LLB)

William Glover Young (born September 23, 1940) is an American attorney and jurist serving as a senior U.S. district judge of the United States District Court for the District of Massachusetts. He was appointed in 1985 by President Ronald Reagan, and he served as chief judge of the district from 1999 to 2005. Young was a judge of the Massachusetts Superior Court from 1978 to 1985.

== Early life and career ==
Born in Huntington, New York, Young received a B.A. degree from Harvard University in 1962. He received a Bachelor of Laws from Harvard Law School in 1967. He was a Captain in the United States Army from 1962 to 1964. He was a law clerk for Chief Justice Raymond S. Wilkins of the Massachusetts Supreme Judicial Court from 1967 to 1968.

Young was in private practice of law in Boston, Massachusetts, from 1968 to 1972. Young was a special assistant attorney general of Massachusetts from 1970 to 1972 and chief counsel to the Governor of Massachusetts, Republican Francis Sargent, from 1972 to 1974. He was in private practice of law in Boston from 1975 to 1978. He was an associate justice of the Massachusetts Superior Court from 1978 to 1985. Young was a lecturer in law for Boston College Law School from 1968 to the present and at Boston University Law School from 1979 to the present. He was a lecturer in law at Harvard Law School from 1979 to 1990.

== Federal judicial service ==
Young was first nominated by President Ronald Reagan on September 11, 1984, to the United States District Court for the District of Massachusetts, to a new seat created by 98 Stat. 333, but the nomination lapsed without a Senate vote. Reagan renominated him on March 8, 1985. He was confirmed by the United States Senate on April 3, 1985, and received his commission on April 4, 1985. He served as chief judge from 1999 to 2005. On March 10, 2021, Young advised President Joe Biden that he intended to retire from regular active service on July 1, 2021, and would serve as a senior judge thereafter. In January 2024, Young blocked the $3.8 billion merger of Spirit Airlines and JetBlue, saying that it would violate the Clayton Act, which "was designed to prevent anticompetitive harms for consumers". Ten months later, Spirit Airlines announced plans to file for bankruptcy. On May 2, 2026, it ceased operations.

== Notable cases ==
=== Patent cases ===
As a federal judge, Young has heard patent cases relating to biotechnology and pharmaceuticals and also heard computer-related patent cases, including a patent infringement suit by a small company against RealNetworks. The jury found that the patents were invalid and the case was affirmed upon appeal.

=== Criminal cases ===
Young has heard many criminal cases both as a Massachusetts state judge and as a federal judge, including the "Big Dan" rape case, the shoe bomber case, and the Boston Strangler case.

He was the trial judge in Massachusetts state court for the highly publicized "Big Dan" rape case which was the inspiration for the movie The Accused. He sentenced Richard Reid, better known as the shoe bomber, to three life terms plus 110 years in prison.

=== Constitutional law cases ===
==== Singer v. City of Newton - drones ====
Young heard Singer v. City of Newton, the first case in the United States on the constitutionality of state and local regulation of drones (unmanned aerial vehicles). He partially invalidated the city ordinance because it was preempted by Federal Aviation Administration regulations.

==== AAUP v. Rubio - free speech ====
Young heard American Association of University Professors et al. v. Marco Rubio, which he called "perhaps the most important to fall within the jurisdiction of this district court". In his decision, he addressed the question "whether non-citizens lawfully present here in United States actually have the same free speech rights as the rest of us". Young answered, "unequivocally 'yes, they do.' 'No law' means 'no law.' The First Amendment does not draw President Trump's invidious distinction and it is not to be found in our history or jurisprudence."

Young further addressed ICE agents' practice of wearing masks:

Can you imagine a masked marine? It is a matter of honor—and honor still matters. To us, masks are associated with cowardly desperados and the despised Ku Klux Klan. In all our history we have never tolerated an armed masked secret police. Carrying on in this fashion, ICE brings indelible obloquy to this administration and everyone who works in it.

Young's decision concluded:

[T]his Court finds as fact and concludes as matter of law that Secretaries Noem and Rubio and their several agents and subordinates acted in concert to misuse the sweeping powers of their respective offices to target noncitizen pro-Palestinians for deportation primarily on account of their First Amendment protected political speech. They did so in order to strike fear into similarly situated non-citizen pro-Palestinian individuals, pro-actively (and effectively) curbing lawful pro-Palestinian speech and intentionally denying such individuals (including the plaintiffs here) the freedom of speech that is their right. Moreover, the effect of these targeted deportation proceedings continues unconstitutionally to chill freedom of speech to this day.

=== American Public Health Association v. National Institutes of Health ===
In American Public Health Association v. National Institutes of Health, United States Supreme Court Justices Neil Gorsuch and Brett Kavanaugh accused Young of defying its shadow docket orders. Justice Stephen Breyer defended Young, and Young apologized.

== See also ==
- List of United States federal judges by longevity of service

== Sources ==
Legal offices
| Preceded by Seat established by 98 Stat. 333 | Judge of the United States District Court for the District of Massachusetts; 1985–2021 | Succeeded by Julia Kobick |
| Preceded by Joseph L. Tauro | Chief Judge of the United States District Court for the District of Massachusetts; 1999–2005 | Succeeded by Mark L. Wolf |
