= Executive Order 14151 =

Ending DEIA programs in US federal government

- "Ending Radical and Wasteful Government DEI Programs and Preferencing"
- Type: Executive order
- Number: 14151
- President: Donald Trump
- Signed: January 20, 2025

Federal Register details
- Federal Register document number: 2025-01953
- Publication date: January 29, 2025

Executive Order 14151, titled "Ending Radical and Wasteful Government DEI Programs and Preferencing", is an executive order issued by Donald Trump, the 47th President of the United States, on January 20, 2025, the day of the inauguration of his second presidency.

The order requires the termination of all activities relating to "diversity, equity, inclusion, and accessibility" (DEIA) by the U.S. federal government and its executive departments: this has resulted in the termination of various DEIA-related positions from the federal government, the removal of references to topics (including recognition of the accomplishments of people based on membership in a minority group) that could constitute a promotion of DEI from federal museums and websites, and restricting applications for federal grants in arts and science that are related to or mention keywords related to DEI.

== Background ==
President Trump signed 26 executive orders on January 20, 2025, his first day as president during his second term. These orders were officially published over the span of January 28 through January 31.

== Provisions and effects ==
EO 14151 directs the director of the Office of Management and Budget (OMB) to terminate all mandates, policies, programs, preferences, and activities relating to 'diversity, equity, inclusion, and accessibility.' It also mandates that agencies must report a list of all employees in DEI and "environmental justice" positions to the OMB director within 60 days.

The order was issued alongside Executive Order 14173, which targets DEI and affirmative action within the hiring practices of federal departments and subcontractors, and mandates a merit-based approach.

== Implementation ==
Lists were compiled across the federal government of any employee who had ever worked in a post related to DEI, as well as employees who didn't work in such posts, but who had purportedly taken part in some sort of diversity training, workshop, affinity group (see below), or other initiative. These employees were subsequently purged en masse.

An internal Department of Government Efficiency report obtained by The Washington Post outlined a three phase process by which DOGE would lead a purge of DEI from the federal government.

- In phase one, which took place on January 20, 2025, all DEI related executive orders and initiatives would be rescinded, offices at various federal organizations that served a DEI role would be dissolved and their employees terminated, federal websites would remove all DEI-related material from their websites, and DEI-related contracts would be terminated.
- In phase two, which is slated to last from January 21 to February 19, the government would begin purging employees that did not work in a DEI-related role, but who had taken part in DEI in some way that made them "corrupted".
- In phase three, scheduled for February 20 to July 19, the DOGE would begin mass-scale firings of any employee in any office or part of the federal government which did not take part in any DEI offices or initiatives, but who was nonetheless determined through unknown criteria to be "DEI-related".

=== Mass layoffs ===
On February 2, 2025, it was reported that the Department of Education had put at least 100 employees, only two of whom actually worked in DEI, on administrative leave to await termination.

The Department of Energy put a double-digit number of employees on administrative leave awaiting termination under the order, less than a quarter of whom actually worked in a DEI role.

In February 2025, the Trump administration proceeded to compile lists of officers in the military accused of supporting diversity, and have them subsequently purged. These ranged from officers who had made tweets in support of diversity, to officers whom the administration simply accused of having originally received their jobs for not being white.

The Central Intelligence Agency compiled lists of every employee that was part of an employee affinity group, and later reportedly dismissed these officers and revoked their security clearances.

On February 2, 2025, it was reported that the Office of Personnel Management (OPM) had put several employees, including many who had not worked in DEI but who had previously taken part in a DEI-related initiative, on administrative leave to await termination. The OPM also sent emails to all federal employees encouraging them to report any coworker they knew of who had been involved with such initiatives.

=== Other actions ===
On February 14, the Department of Education put out a letter accusing American educational institutions of discriminating against white and Asian students based on race, and ordering a halt to any "hiring, promotion, compensation, financial aid, scholarships, prizes, administrative support, discipline, housing, graduation ceremonies, and all other aspects of student, academic, and campus life" that was related to DEI.

Attorney General Pam Bondi ordered the Department of Justice to criminally investigate any company with a DEI policy. In April 2025, the Department of Justice terminated a landmark civil rights settlement with the State of Alabama to address serious health risks posed by Lowndes County's inadequate sanitation systems. The department claimed that the Biden-era agreement violated President Trump's proscription of DEI initiatives.

The Internal Revenue Service reportedly deleted any mention of diversity, equity, or inclusion from its procedural handbook.

In June 2025, Secretary of Defense Pete Hegseth announced that USNS Harvey Milk would be renamed. Milk, who served in the US Navy during the Korean War, was also a gay rights activist and himself a homosexual. The ship was subsequently renamed USNS Oscar V. Peterson. The United States Military Academy ordered the shutdown of all student "affinity" groups - student organizations oriented towards racial minorities, women, and/or LGBT people. The National Cryptologic Museum covered up plaques celebrating women and people of color who had served the NSA, and the United States Army Women's Museum covered up a poster celebrating the contributions of transgender soldiers.

The Defense Intelligence Agency and the Cybersecurity and Infrastructure Security Agency also reportedly dissolved their employee affinity groups, with the former also ceasing all recognition of Martin Luther King Day, Holocaust Remembrance Day, Black History Month, Pride Month, and other similar civil-rights related holidays. The Central Intelligence Agency and Federal Bureau of Investigation both dissolved their diversity offices, with the former reportedly also dissolving all employee affinity groups (see above) and compiling lists of every employee that was part of one.

Employees at NASA were instructed by headquarters to "drop everything" in favor of using the time to scrub NASA websites of anything relating to diversity, underrepresented minority groups, and/or women (such as women in leadership).

The National Science Foundation compiled an internal list of words the presence of which in a research paper, grant application, or other relevant documentation, would flag a project and put its funding under review. Words that would initiate a review included "women", "female", "gender", "bipoc", "LGBT", "disability", "hate speech", and "trauma", among others.

The National Endowment for the Arts (NEA) imposed restrictions on grant applications to comply with the order barring federal funds for programs focused on DEI or used to "promote gender ideology".

In December 2025, ProPublica reported that after the signing of EO 14151, more than 1000 nonprofits rewrote the mission statements in their tax filings to remove references to DEI efforts.

== See also ==
- Anti-LGBT curriculum laws in the United States
- Culture war
- Florida Parental Rights in Education Act (HB 1557, 2022)
- List of executive orders in the second presidency of Donald Trump
  - Executive Order 14168 ("Defending Women from Gender Ideology Extremism and Restoring Biological Truth to the Federal Government")
  - Executive Order 14183 ("Prioritizing Military Excellence and Readiness")
  - Executive Order 14187 ("Protecting Children from Chemical and Surgical Mutilation")
- Merit, excellence, and intelligence (MEI) – framework that emphasizes selecting candidates based solely on their merit, achievements, skills, abilities, intelligence, and contributions
- Racism in the United States
  - Institutional racism in the United States
  - Florida Senate Bill 266 (HB 999, 2023)
  - Schuette v. Coalition to Defend Affirmative Action (572 U.S. 291, 2014)
  - White supremacy in U.S. school curriculum
- Social conservatism in the United States
- Students for Fair Admissions v. Harvard (600 U.S. 181, 2023)
