= Bomb lance =

Type of projectile weapon used in whaling

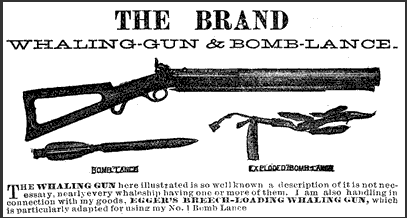
Bomb lance with shoulder gun at the New Bedford Whaling Museum

A bomb lance is a projectile weapon used in whaling to injure and kill the object of the hunt. As the name implies, it explodes once it has embedded itself into a whale. The conditions of whale hunting in the arctic led to the invention of the bomb lance. There, the presence of ice floes provide cover for whales to dive under, making it nearly impossible to execute a hand lance kill before the whale can escape. With bomb lances, a well directed shot assures a quick kill.

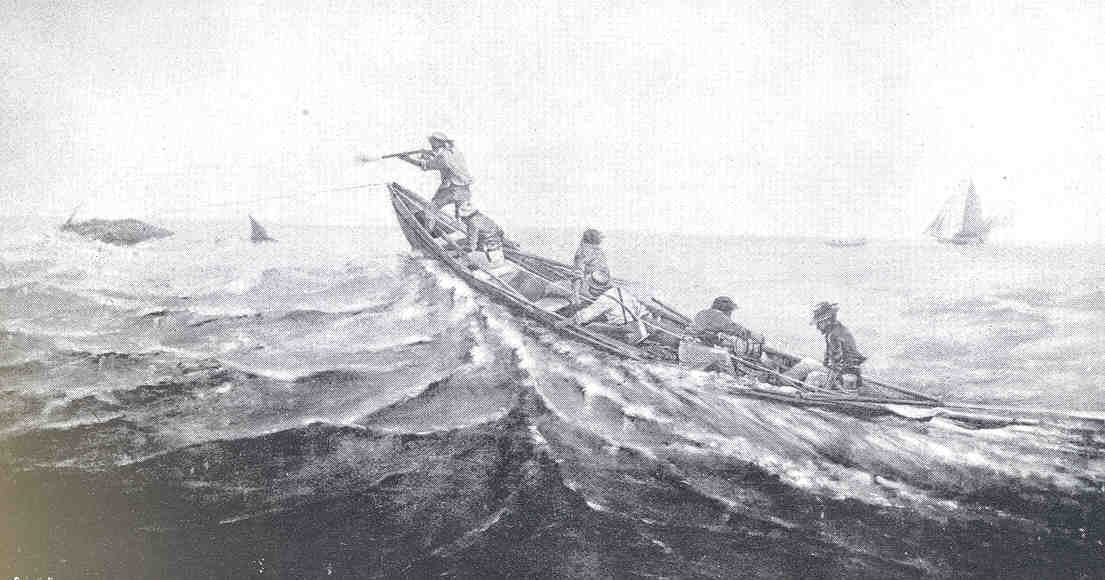
Shooting a bomb lance into a whale

In 1874, a bomb lance was 21.5 inches long and pointed with three elastic feathers. It was fired from a three-foot long bomb gun made of iron, with a 23-inch barrel and a 1 1/8 inch bore. It weighed twenty-four pounds. Though it was first used as early as 1849, it wasn't widely utilized by open-boat whalemen until the late 1850s. It had an accurate range of about sixty feet. It was used to kill whales from a distance instead of using a hand-thrown lance. Men were occasionally injured when the guns burst. Between 1850 and 1870, several different types of shoulder guns were patented for firing bomb lances, including those made by Captain Ebenezer Pierce, Patrick Cunningham, Selmar Eggers, and Christopher Brand. Shoulder guns were used for firing bomb lances throughout whaling into the 20th century.

In 2007, Inupiat whalers conducting a traditional subsistence hunt killed a 50-ton bowhead with a modern bomb lance, kicking off a flurry of research into species longevity when it was revealed that the whale's body also contained fragments of an older bomb lance manufactured back in the 19th century, leading to the discovery that the whale was over 130 years old. “No other finding has been this precise,” said John Bockstoce, an adjunct curator of the New Bedford Whaling Museum. It is possible the hunters who killed the ancient bowhead could be descended from the very same hunters who first attacked it more than a century ago. Bockstoce says he found tiny scratches on the lance head. "And that, we think, is an ownership mark that a native whaleman would have used. Because the Eskimos who have hunted whales for at least 2000 years up there for their subsistence, they mark their hunting equipment with their own particular brand. This has six little notches, and we don't know who that person was, but it is definitely unlike something that would have been done by say, a commercial whaleman at the same time."

Bomb lances played a key role in the development of U.S. property law concerning whaling customs. In the landmark case Ghen v. Rich, a federal court upheld the Provincetown custom for finback whaling: the whaler who first killed a whale by firing a marked bomb lance (which remained embedded in the carcass) owned it when the body later washed ashore, even without a tethered line for continuous pursuit. The court viewed this as consistent with the broader American whaling rule of "iron holds the whale"—where planting a marked harpoon or lance established ownership—as recognized in prior cases such as Swift v. Gifford. The decision illustrated how reasonable industry customs could establish possession of wild animals (ferae naturae).
