= John J. McNaught =

American judge

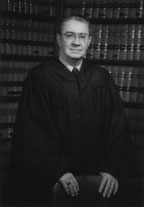

Judge of the United States District Court for the District of Massachusetts
- In office March 23, 1979 – February 1, 1991
- Appointed by: Jimmy Carter
- Preceded by: Seat established by 92 Stat. 1629
- Succeeded by: Richard G. Stearns

Judge of the Massachusetts Superior Court
- In office 1972–1979

Personal details
- Born: John Joseph McNaught; November 22, 1921 Malden, Massachusetts
- Died: January 24, 1994 (aged 72) Melrose, Massachusetts
- Cause of death: Pneumonia
- Education: Boston College (BA, JD)

Military service
- Branch/service: United States Army
- Years of service: 1943–1946
- Rank: Second Lieutenant
- Unit: Transportation Corps
- Battles/wars: World War II

John Joseph McNaught (November 22, 1921 – January 24, 1994) was a United States district judge of the United States District Court for the District of Massachusetts.

== Education and career ==
Born in Malden, Massachusetts, McNaught graduated from Malden Catholic High School in 1939. He received a Bachelor of Arts degree from Boston College in 1943 and was in the United States Army for the remainder of World War II, from 1943 to 1946. He received a Juris Doctor from Boston College Law School in 1949. He was in private practice in Malden from 1949 to 1950, and was then a law clerk to Judge William T. McCarthy of the United States District Court for the District of Massachusetts from 1950 to 1954, thereafter returning to private practice in Boston until 1972. He was an associate justice of the Superior Court of the Commonwealth of Massachusetts from 1972 to 1979.

== Federal judicial service ==
On January 25, 1979, McNaught was nominated by President Jimmy Carter to a new seat on the United States District Court for the District of Massachusetts created by 92 Stat. 1629. He was confirmed by the United States Senate on March 21, 1979, and received his commission on March 23, 1979. McNaught served in that capacity until his retirement on February 1, 1991.

== Post-judicial service ==
From 1991 to 1994 he was in private practice in Melrose.

== Death ==
McNaught died of pneumonia on January 24, 1994, at Melrose-Wakefield Hospital in Melrose, Massachusetts.

== Sources ==
Legal offices
Preceded by Seat established by 92 Stat. 1629	Judge of the United States District Court for the District of Massachusetts; 1979–1991	Succeeded by Richard G. Stearns
