= List of United States federal courthouses in Massachusetts =

Following is a list of current and former courthouses of the United States federal court system located in Massachusetts. Each entry indicates the name of the building along with an image, if available, its location and the jurisdiction it covers, the dates during which it was used for each such jurisdiction, and, if applicable the person for whom it was named, and the date of renaming. Dates of use will not necessarily correspond with the dates of construction or demolition of a building, as pre-existing structures may be adapted for court use, and former court buildings may later be put to other uses. Also, the official name of the building may be changed at some point after its use as a federal court building has been initiated.

== Courthouses ==
Courthouse	City	Image	Street address	Jurisdiction	Dates of use	Named for
U.S. Post Office and Subtreasury	Boston		5 Post Office Square	D. Mass.	1883–1929; Razed in 1929	n/a
John W. McCormack U.S. Post Office and Courthouse†	Boston		5 Post Office Square	D. Mass.	1933–present	John William McCormack
John Joseph Moakley U.S. Courthouse	Boston		1 Courthouse Way	D. Mass., 1st Cir.	1999–present	U.S. Rep. Joe Moakley
U.S. Post Office and Court House	Springfield		436 Dwight Street	D. Mass.	1932–1983; Now in use by the state government.	n/a
1550 Main	Springfield		1550 Main Street	D. Mass.	1981–2008	n/a
U.S. Court House	Springfield		300 State Street	D. Mass.	2008–present	n/a
U.S. States Post Office	Worcester		?	D. Mass.	1926–1930; Razed ca. 1930	n/a
Harold D. Donohue Federal Building and United States Courthouse†	Worcester		595 Main Street	D. Mass.	1932–present	U.S. Rep. Harold Donohue (1987)

== Key ==
^{†}	Listed on the National Register of Historic Places (NRHP)
^{††}	NRHP-listed and also designated as a National Historic Landmark
