= Judge Schofield =

Judge Schofield may refer to:

- Lorna G. Schofield (born 1956), judge of the United States District Court for the Southern District of New York
- William Schofield (1857–1912), judge of the United States Court of Appeals for the First Circuit
