= Thomas Leverett Nelson =

American judge

Judge of the United States District Court for the District of Massachusetts
- In office January 10, 1879 – November 21, 1897
- Appointed by: Rutherford B. Hayes
- Preceded by: John Lowell
- Succeeded by: Francis Cabot Lowell

Personal details
- Born: Thomas Leverett Nelson; March 4, 1827 Haverhill, New Hampshire
- Died: November 21, 1897 (aged 70) Worcester, Massachusetts
- Education: Dartmouth College; University of Vermont read law

Thomas Leverett Nelson (March 4, 1827 – November 21, 1897) was a United States district judge of the United States District Court for the District of Massachusetts.

Nelson was nominated by President Rutherford B. Hayes on January 7, 1879, to a seat vacated by John Lowell. He was confirmed by the United States Senate on January 10, 1879, and received commission the same day. Nelson's service was terminated on November 21, 1897, due to death.

== Education and career ==
Born on March 4, 1827, in Haverhill, New Hampshire, Nelson, one of twelve children of John and Lois Leverett Nelson, attended Kimball Union Academy in Meriden, New Hampshire. He attended Dartmouth College for two years, then graduated from the University of Vermont in 1846. Following graduation, he became an engineer and engaged in railroad construction. A serious accident which permanently injured his knee ended his engineering career and while in physical recovery, he began to study law with Judge Francis H. Dewey. He read law and was admitted to the bar in 1855. He entered private practice in Worcester, Massachusetts from 1855 to 1879. He was a member of the Massachusetts House of Representatives in 1869. He was city solicitor for Worcester from 1870 to 1873. He served as Railroad Commissioner for the Providence and Worcester Railroad.

== Federal judicial service ==
Nelson was nominated by President Rutherford B. Hayes on January 7, 1879, to a seat on the United States District Court for the District of Massachusetts vacated by Judge John Lowell. He was confirmed by the United States Senate on January 10, 1879, and received his commission the same day. His service terminated on November 21, 1897, due to his death in Worcester.

== Religious memberships ==
Nelson was active in Congregational churches early in his life and then became a member of First Unitarian Church in Worcester and then Central Church.

== Civic membership ==
Nelson was a member of the American Antiquarian Society.

== Notable decisions ==
- Ghen v. Rich, 8 F. 159 (1881)

Legal offices
| Preceded by John Lowell | Judge of the United States District Court for the District of Massachusetts; 1879–1897 | Succeeded by Francis Cabot Lowell |
