= Francis Cabot Lowell (judge) =

American judge (1855–1911)

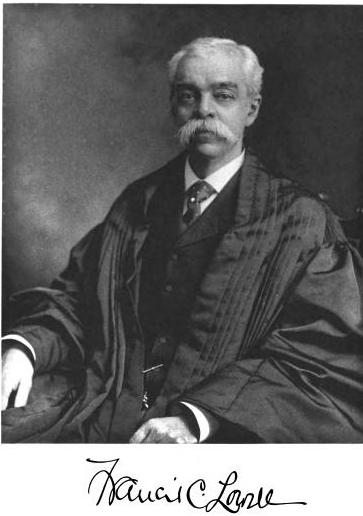

Judge of the United States Court of Appeals for the First Circuit
- In office February 23, 1905 – March 6, 1911
- Appointed by: Theodore Roosevelt
- Preceded by: Seat established by 33 Stat. 611
- Succeeded by: William Schofield

Judge of the United States Circuit Courts for the First Circuit
- In office February 23, 1905 – March 6, 1911
- Appointed by: Theodore Roosevelt
- Preceded by: Seat established by 33 Stat. 611
- Succeeded by: William Schofield

Judge of the United States District Court for the District of Massachusetts
- In office January 10, 1898 – April 15, 1905
- Appointed by: William McKinley
- Preceded by: Thomas Leverett Nelson
- Succeeded by: Frederic Dodge

Member of the Massachusetts House of Representatives
- In office 1895

Personal details
- Born: January 7, 1855 Boston, Massachusetts, U.S.
- Died: March 6, 1911 (aged 56) Boston, Massachusetts, U.S.
- Spouse: Cornelia Prime Baylies (m. 1882)
- Relatives: Lowell family
- Education: Harvard University (AB, LLB)

Francis Cabot Lowell (January 7, 1855 – March 6, 1911) was a United States circuit judge of the United States Court of Appeals for the First Circuit and of the United States Circuit Courts for the First Circuit and previously was a United States district judge of the United States District Court for the District of Massachusetts.

== Early life ==
Lowell was born on January 7, 1855, in Boston, Massachusetts. He was the only son of George Gardner Lowell (1830–1885) and Mary Ellen (née Parker) Lowell (1832–1915), a daughter of James Parker. His sister, Anna Parker Lowell, married their distant cousin and Francis' law partner, A. Lawrence Lowell, the 22nd President of Harvard University.

His paternal grandfather was industrialist Francis Cabot Lowell, Jr. (son of Francis Cabot Lowell, namesake of Lowell, Massachusetts), and his paternal uncle was historian Edward Jackson Lowell.

He received an Artium Baccalaureus degree in 1876 from Harvard College and a Bachelor of Laws in 1879 from Harvard Law School.

== Career ==
Lowell entered private practice in Boston from 1880 to 1898 with his well-known cousin A. Lawrence Lowell. He was private secretary to Justice Horace Gray of the Supreme Judicial Court of Massachusetts from 1880 to 1882. He was a member of the Boston Common Council from 1889 to 1891. He was a member of the Massachusetts House of Representatives in 1895.

=== Federal judicial service ===
Lowell was nominated by President William McKinley on January 5, 1898, to a seat on the United States District Court for the District of Massachusetts vacated by Judge Thomas Leverett Nelson. He was confirmed by the United States Senate on January 10, 1898, and received his commission the same day. His service terminated on April 15, 1905, due to his elevation to the First Circuit.

Lowell was nominated by President Theodore Roosevelt on February 15, 1905, to the United States Court of Appeals for the First Circuit and the United States Circuit Courts for the First Circuit, to a new joint seat authorized by 33 Stat. 611. He was confirmed by the Senate on February 23, 1905, and received his commission the same day. His service terminated on March 6, 1911, due to his death in Boston.

== Personal life ==
On November 27, 1882, Lowell was married to Cornelia Prime Baylies (1859–1922) in New York City. Cornelia, who was born in Newport, Rhode Island, was a daughter of New York merchant Edmund Lincoln Baylies and Nathalie Elizabeth (née Ray) Baylies. Her brother was the prominent New York lawyer Edmund L. Baylies. Among her first cousins were Elizabeth Livingston Cavendish-Bentinck (the wife of George Cavendish-Bentinck), Ruth Livingston Mills (the wife of Ogden Mills), and Robert Ray Hamilton.

He was elected a member of the American Antiquarian Society in 1895.

Judge Lowell died suddenly on March 6, 1911, at his home on Beacon Street in Boston. His widow died in 1922.

== Sources ==
Legal offices
Preceded by Thomas Leverett Nelson	Judge of the United States District Court for the District of Massachusetts; 1898–1905	Succeeded by Frederic Dodge
Preceded by Seat established by 33 Stat. 611	Judge of the United States Circuit Courts for the First Circuit; 1905–1911	Succeeded by William Schofield
Preceded by Seat established by 33 Stat. 611	Judge of the United States Court of Appeals for the First Circuit; 1905–1911	Succeeded by William Schofield
