= James Madison Morton Jr. =

American judge (1869–1940)

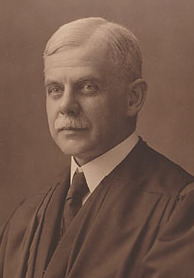

Senior Judge of the United States Court of Appeals for the First Circuit
- In office September 30, 1939 – June 26, 1940

Judge of the United States Court of Appeals for the First Circuit
- In office January 9, 1932 – September 30, 1939
- Appointed by: Herbert Hoover
- Preceded by: George W. Anderson
- Succeeded by: John Christopher Mahoney

Judge of the United States District Court for the District of Massachusetts
- In office August 12, 1912 – January 19, 1932
- Appointed by: William Howard Taft
- Preceded by: Frederic Dodge
- Succeeded by: Hugh Dean McLellan

Personal details
- Born: James Madison Morton Jr. August 24, 1869 Fall River, Massachusetts
- Died: June 26, 1940 (aged 70) Fall River, Massachusetts
- Education: Harvard University (AB, AM); Harvard Law School (LLB)

James Madison Morton Jr. (August 24, 1869 – June 26, 1940) was a United States circuit judge of the United States Court of Appeals for the First Circuit and previously was a United States District Judge of the United States District Court for the District of Massachusetts.

== Education and career ==
Born on August 24, 1869, in Fall River, Massachusetts, Morton's father, James Madison Morton Sr., was a prominent Boston lawyer who eventually served on the state supreme court. Morton received an Artium Baccalaureus degree in 1891 from Harvard University and received an Artium Magister degree in 1894 from the same institution. He received a Bachelor of Laws in 1894 from Harvard Law School. He was in private practice in Fall River from 1894 to 1912.

== Federal judicial service ==
Morton was nominated by President William Howard Taft on August 9, 1912, to a seat on the United States District Court for the District of Massachusetts vacated by Judge Frederic Dodge. He was confirmed by the United States Senate on August 12, 1912, and received his commission the same day. His service terminated on January 19, 1932, due to his elevation to the First Circuit.

Morton was nominated by President Herbert Hoover on December 15, 1931, to a seat on the United States Court of Appeals for the First Circuit vacated by Judge George W. Anderson. He was confirmed by the Senate on January 6, 1932, and received his commission on January 9, 1932. He assumed senior status on September 30, 1939. His service terminated on June 26, 1940, due to his death in Fall River.

Legal offices
Preceded by Frederic Dodge	Judge of the United States District Court for the District of Massachusetts; 1912–1932	Succeeded by Hugh Dean McLellan
Preceded by George W. Anderson	Judge of the United States Court of Appeals for the First Circuit; 1932–1939	Succeeded by John Christopher Mahoney
