= Herbert F. Travers Jr. =

American judge

United States Attorney for the District of Massachusetts
- In office 1969–1971
- Preceded by: Paul F. Markham
- Succeeded by: James N. Gabriel

Personal details
- Born: May 8, 1928 Worcester, Massachusetts, U.S.
- Died: December 26, 2013 (aged 85) Barnstable, Massachusetts, U.S.
- Education: College of the Holy Cross (BA); Georgetown University (LLB)

Herbert F. Travers Jr. (May 8, 1928 – December 26, 2013) was an American attorney and judge who served as the United States Attorney for the District of Massachusetts from 1969 to 1971 and later served as a Massachusetts Superior Court judge. Born in Worcester, Massachusetts, in 1928, Travers died on December 26, 2013, in Barnstable, Massachusetts.
