= Elisha Hume Brewster =

American judge (1871–1946)

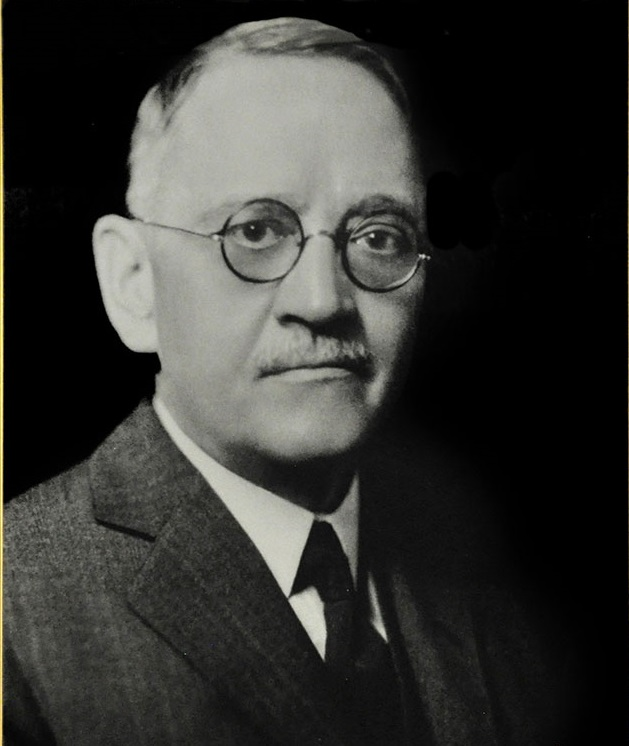

Senior Judge of the United States District Court for the District of Massachusetts
- In office October 14, 1941 – April 29, 1946

Judge of the United States District Court for the District of Massachusetts
- In office September 22, 1922 – October 14, 1941
- Appointed by: Warren G. Harding
- Preceded by: Seat established by 42 Stat. 837
- Succeeded by: Arthur Daniel Healey

Personal details
- Born: Elisha Hume Brewster; September 10, 1871 Worthington, Massachusetts
- Died: April 29, 1946 (aged 74) Springfield, Massachusetts
- Education: Boston University School of Law (LL.B.)

Elisha Hume Brewster (September 10, 1871 – April 29, 1946) was a United States district judge of the United States District Court for the District of Massachusetts.

== Education and career ==
Born in Worthington, Massachusetts, Brewster received a Bachelor of Laws from Boston University School of Law in 1896. He was private practice from 1896 to 1922, and was a member of the Massachusetts House of Representatives from 1902 to 1904.

== Federal judicial service ==
On September 20, 1922, Brewster was nominated by President Warren G. Harding to a new seat on the United States District Court for the District of Massachusetts created by 42 Stat. 837. He was confirmed by the United States Senate on September 22, 1922, and received his commission the same day. He assumed senior status on October 14, 1941, serving in that capacity until his death on April 29, 1946, in Springfield, Massachusetts.

== Sources ==
Legal offices
Preceded by Seat established by 42 Stat. 837	Judge of the United States District Court for the District of Massachusetts; 1922–1941	Succeeded by Arthur Daniel Healey
