= Frederic Dodge =

American judge (1847–1927)

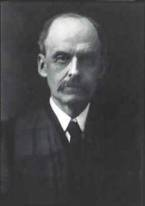

Judge of the United States Court of Appeals for the First Circuit
- In office July 23, 1912 – June 30, 1918
- Appointed by: William Howard Taft
- Preceded by: William Schofield
- Succeeded by: George W. Anderson

Judge of the United States District Court for the District of Massachusetts
- In office February 23, 1905 – September 10, 1912
- Appointed by: Theodore Roosevelt
- Preceded by: Francis Cabot Lowell
- Succeeded by: James Madison Morton Jr.

Personal details
- Born: Frederic Dodge; April 4, 1847 Cambridge, Massachusetts
- Died: March 7, 1927 (aged 79) Belmont, Massachusetts
- Education: Harvard University (BA); Harvard Law School (LLB)

Frederic Dodge (April 4, 1847 – March 7, 1927) was a United States circuit judge of the United States Court of Appeals for the First Circuit and previously was a United States District Judge of the United States District Court for the District of Massachusetts.

== Education and career ==
Born in Cambridge, Massachusetts, Dodge received a Bachelor of Arts degree from Harvard University in 1867 and a Bachelor of Laws from Harvard Law School in 1869. He was in private practice of law in Boston, Massachusetts from 1869 to 1905.

== Federal judicial service ==
Dodge was nominated by President Theodore Roosevelt on February 15, 1905, to a seat on the United States District Court for the District of Massachusetts vacated by Judge Francis Cabot Lowell. He was confirmed by the United States Senate on February 23, 1905, and received his commission the same day. His service terminated on September 10, 1912, due to his elevation to the First Circuit.

Dodge was nominated by President William Howard Taft on July 10, 1912, to a seat on the United States Court of Appeals for the First Circuit vacated by Judge William Schofield. He was confirmed by the Senate on July 23, 1912, and received his commission the same day. His service terminated on June 30, 1918, due to his resignation.

== Death ==
Dodge died on March 7, 1927, in Belmont, Massachusetts.

== Sources ==
Legal offices
| Preceded by Francis Cabot Lowell | Judge of the United States District Court for the District of Massachusetts; 1905–1912 | Succeeded by James Madison Morton Jr. |
| Preceded by William Schofield | Judge of the United States Court of Appeals for the First Circuit; 1912–1918 | Succeeded by George W. Anderson |
