= Andrew A. Caffrey =

American judge (1920–1993)

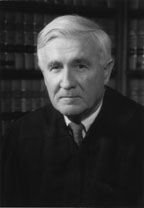

Senior Judge of the United States District Court for the District of Massachusetts
- In office October 17, 1986 – October 6, 1993

Chief Judge of the United States District Court for the District of Massachusetts
- In office 1972–1986
- Preceded by: Anthony Julian
- Succeeded by: Frank Harlan Freedman

Judge of the United States District Court for the District of Massachusetts
- In office October 13, 1960 – October 17, 1986
- Nominated by: Dwight D. Eisenhower
- Appointed by: Dwight D. Eisenhower (recess); John F. Kennedy (commission)
- Preceded by: William T. McCarthy
- Succeeded by: Edward F. Harrington

Personal details
- Born: Andrew Augustine Caffrey; November 2, 1920 Lawrence, Massachusetts, U.S.
- Died: November 6, 1993 (aged 73) West Palm Beach, Florida, U.S.
- Spouse: Evelyn F. White
- Children: 6
- Education: College of the Holy Cross (BA); Boston College (LLB); Harvard University (LLM)

Military service
- Branch/service: United States Army
- Years of service: 1942–1946
- Battles/wars: World War II

Andrew Augustine Caffrey (October 2, 1920 – October 6, 1993) was a United States district judge of the United States District Court for the District of Massachusetts.

== Early life and education ==
Caffrey was born in Lawrence, Massachusetts, on October 2, 1920. He graduated from the College of the Holy Cross in Worcester, Massachusetts, with a Bachelor of Arts in English literature in 1941. As an undergraduate at Holy Cross, Caffrey was a member of Alpha Sigma Nu and wrote a senior thesis titled, "Civil society, its nature and purpose".

After graduation, Caffrey served in the United States Army from May 20, 1944, to July 2, 1946. He was an intelligence lieutenant in the United States Army Signal Corps, Intelligence Branch. After his military service, he earned a Bachelor of Laws in 1948 from Boston College Law School and a Master of Laws from Harvard Law School that same year.

== Early career ==
He was an associate professor at Boston College Law School from 1948 to 1955. He was Chief of the Civil Division of the Office of United States Attorney for the District of Massachusetts from 1955 to 1959, and First Assistant United States Attorney in that office from 1959 to 1960.

== Federal judicial service ==
Caffrey received a recess appointment from President Dwight D. Eisenhower on October 13, 1960, to a seat on the United States District Court for the District of Massachusetts vacated by Judge William T. McCarthy. He was nominated to the same position by President Eisenhower on January 10, 1961. He was confirmed by the United States Senate on August 9, 1961, and received his commission from President John F. Kennedy on August 16, 1961. He served as Chief Judge from 1972 to 1986. He was a member of the Judicial Conference of the United States from 1973 to 1979. He was a member of the Judicial Panel on Multidistrict Litigation from 1975 to 1990, serving as chair of that panel from 1980 to 1990. He assumed senior status on October 17, 1986. His service terminated on October 6, 1993, due to his death in West Palm Beach, Florida.

== Sources ==
- Judges of the United States (1983)

Legal offices
Preceded by William T. McCarthy	Judge of the United States District Court for the District of Massachusetts; 1960–1986	Succeeded by Edward F. Harrington
Preceded by Anthony Julian	Chief Judge of the United States District Court for the District of Massachusetts; 1972–1986	Succeeded by Frank Harlan Freedman
