= List of federal judges appointed by William Howard Taft =

President William Howard Taft.

Following is a list of all Article III United States federal judges appointed by President William Howard Taft during his presidency. In total Taft appointed 57 Article III federal judges, among them were: six justices to the Supreme Court of the United States, including the appointment of a sitting associate justice as chief justice, 13 judges to the United States Courts of Appeals, and 38 judges to the United States district courts. Taft also appointed judges to various specialty courts, including 5 appointees to the Article III United States Commerce Court, 6 appointees to the Article I United States Court of Customs Appeals and 1 appointee to the Article I tribunal Board of General Appraisers (later the United States Customs Court). The Commerce Court was abolished in 1913; Taft was thus the only president to appoint judges to that body.

From the establishment of the United States courts of appeals on June 16, 1891, until the abolition of the United States circuit courts on December 31, 1911, all United States Circuit Judges where jointly appointed to both the United States court of appeal and the United States circuit court for their respective circuit. Starting January 1, 1912, United States Circuit Judges served only on the United States court of appeal for their respective circuit.

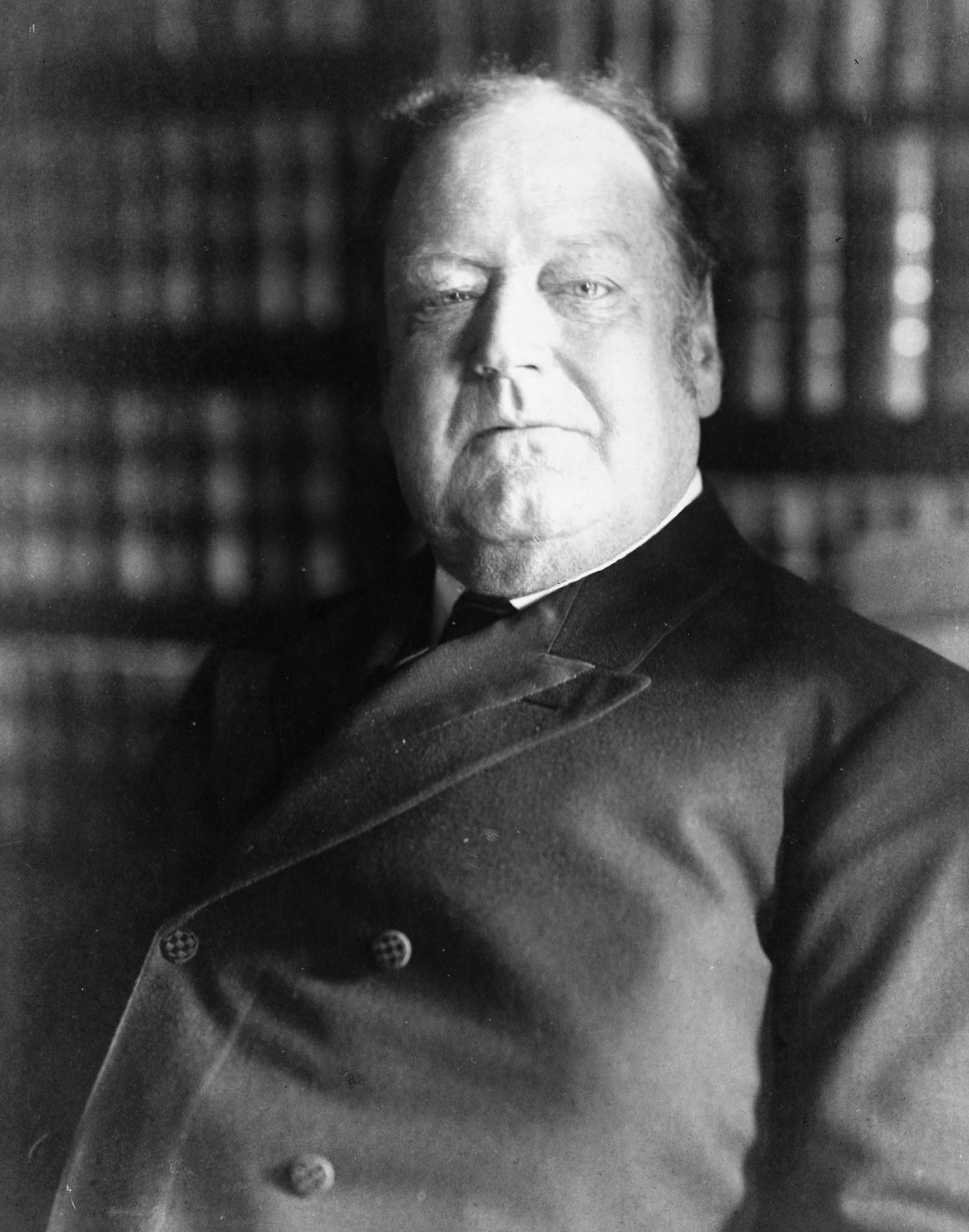
Taft picked Edward Douglass White to be Chief Justice of the Supreme Court.

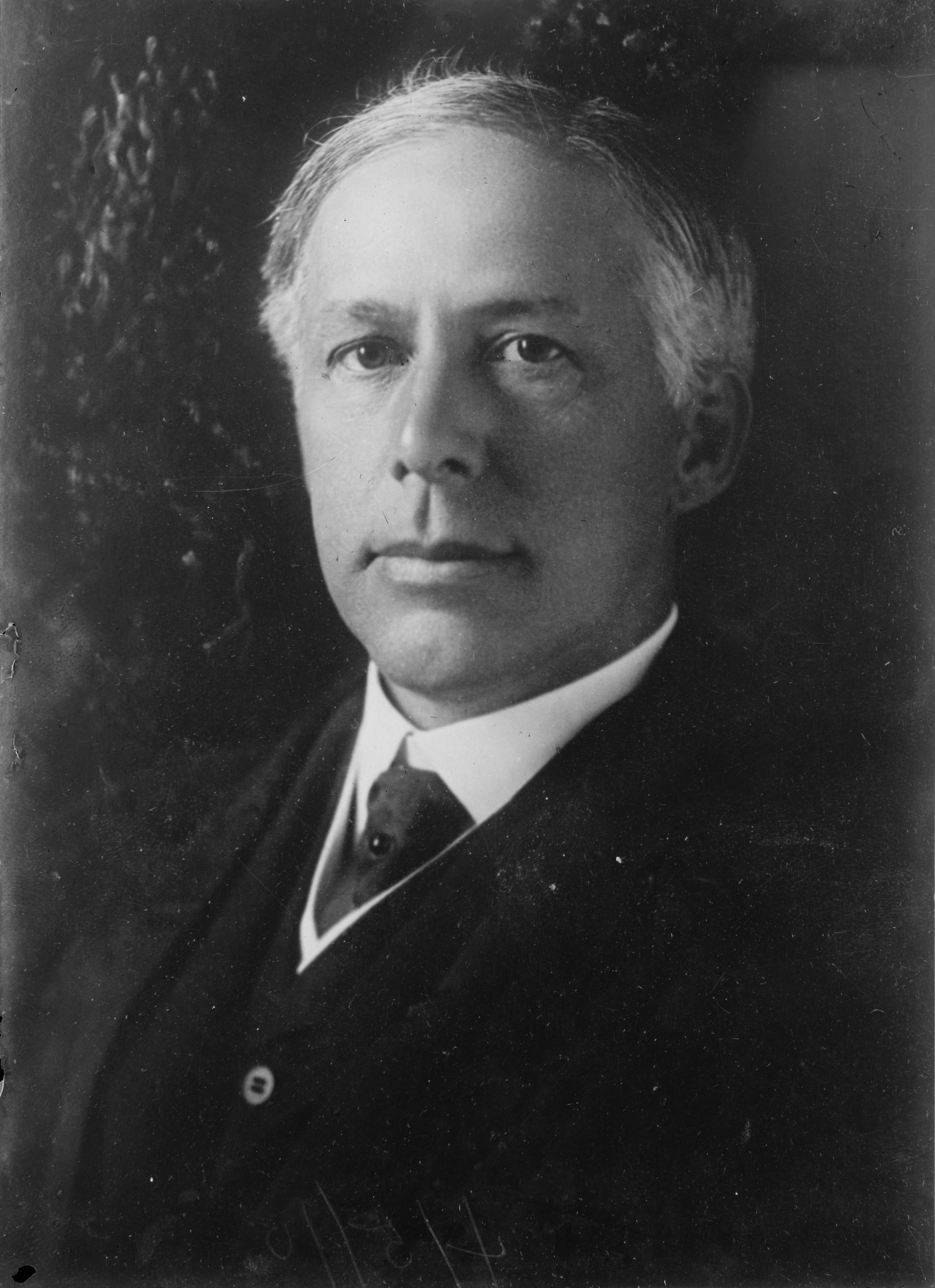
Willis Van Devanter was the longest-serving of Taft's five Supreme Court appointees.

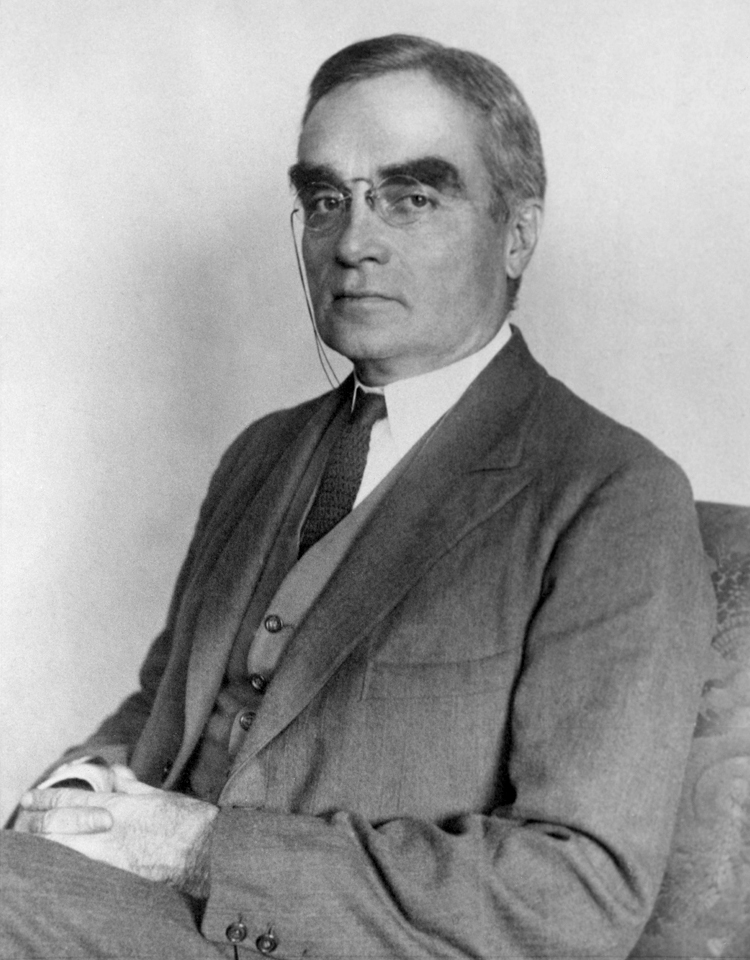
Learned Hand, appointed by Taft to the United States District Court for the Southern District of New York, was later elevated by Calvin Coolidge to the United States Court of Appeals for the Second Circuit.

== United States Supreme Court justices ==
#	Justice	Seat	State	Former justice	Nomination date	Confirmation date	Began active service	Ended active service	Ended retired service
1	Horace Harmon Lurton	3	Tennessee	Rufus W. Peckham	December 13, 1909	December 20, 1909	December 20, 1909	July 12, 1914	–
2	Charles Evans Hughes	6	New York	David Josiah Brewer	April 25, 1910	May 2, 1910	May 2, 1910	June 10, 1916	–
3	Edward Douglass White	Chief	Louisiana	Melville Fuller	December 12, 1910	December 12, 1910	December 12, 1910	May 19, 1921	–
4	Willis Van Devanter	1	Wyoming	Edward Douglass White	December 12, 1910	December 15, 1910	December 16, 1910	June 2, 1937	February 8, 1941
5	Joseph Rucker Lamar	4	Georgia	William Henry Moody	December 12, 1910	December 15, 1910	December 17, 1910	January 2, 1916	–
6	Mahlon Pitney	8	New Jersey	John Marshall Harlan	February 19, 1912	March 13, 1912	March 13, 1912	December 31, 1922	–

== Courts of appeals and circuit courts ==
The United States circuit courts were abolished on January 1, 1912, the final day of service being December 31, 1911. Judges Frederic Dodge and John Bayard McPherson did not have any United States circuit court service, having taken office subsequent to abolition of the circuit courts.

#	Judge	Circuit	Nomination date	Confirmation date	Began active service	Ended active service	Ended senior status
1	John Wesley Warrington	Sixth	March 16, 1909	March 16, 1909	March 16, 1909	October 6, 1919	May 26, 1921
2	William M. Lanning	Third	May 6, 1909	May 18, 1909	May 18, 1909	February 16, 1912	–
3	Loyal Edwin Knappen	Sixth	January 17, 1910	January 31, 1910	January 31, 1910	April 15, 1924	May 14, 1930
4	Martin Augustine Knapp	Second / Fourth	December 12, 1910	December 20, 1910	December 20, 1910	February 10, 1923	–
5	Robert W. Archbald	Third	December 12, 1910	January 31, 1911	January 31, 1911	January 13, 1913	–
6	John Emmett Carland	Eighth	December 12, 1910	January 31, 1911	January 31, 1911	November 11, 1922	–
7	Julian Mack	Seventh / Sixth / Second	December 12, 1910	January 31, 1911	January 31, 1911	September 6, 1940	September 5, 1943
8	Walter I. Smith	Eighth	January 17, 1911	January 31, 1911	January 31, 1911	January 27, 1922	–
9	William Henry Hunt	Ninth	December 12, 1910	January 31, 1911	February 8, 1911	January 31, 1928	November 30, 1928
10	Arthur Carter Denison	Sixth	February 25, 1911	March 2, 1911	March 2, 1911	December 31, 1931	–
11	William Schofield	First	May 25, 1911	June 6, 1911	June 6, 1911	June 10, 1912	–
12	John Bayard McPherson	Third	March 16, 1912	April 3, 1912	April 3, 1912	January 20, 1919	–
13	Frederic Dodge	First	July 10, 1912	July 23, 1912	July 23, 1912	June 30, 1918	–

== District courts ==
#	Judge	Court (Note: See List of United States district and territorial courts)	Nomination date	Confirmation date	Began active service	Ended active service	Ended senior status
1	Oscar Richard Hundley	N.D. Ala.	–	–	March 6, 1909	May 25, 1909	–
2	Milton D. Purdy	D. Minn.	December 8, 1908 (Note: Previously nominated by President Roosevelt on April 23, 1908. Renominated by President Roosevelt on December 8, 1908.)	–	March 6, 1909	May 1, 1909	–
3	Charles Prentiss Orr	W.D. Pa.	March 25, 1909	April 8, 1909	April 8, 1909	May 16, 1922	–
4	Learned Hand	S.D.N.Y.	April 1, 1909	April 26, 1909	April 26, 1909	December 29, 1924	Elevated
5	Robert S. Bean	D. Ore.	April 15, 1909	April 28, 1909	April 28, 1909	January 7, 1931	–
6	George Donworth	W.D. Wash.	May 8, 1909	May 18, 1909	May 18, 1909	March 20, 1912	–
7	William Irwin Grubb	N.D. Ala.	May 8, 1909	May 18, 1909	May 18, 1909	October 27, 1935	–
8	John Rellstab	D.N.J.	May 6, 1909	May 18, 1909	May 18, 1909	October 10, 1928	September 22, 1930
9	Charles Andrew Willard	D. Minn.	May 8, 1909	May 18, 1909	May 18, 1909	March 13, 1914	–
10	Henry G. Connor	E.D.N.C.	May 10, 1909	May 25, 1909	May 25, 1909	November 23, 1924	–
11	George Albert Carpenter	N.D. Ill.	December 13, 1909	January 11, 1910	January 11, 1910	June 30, 1933	–
12	Arthur Carter Denison	W.D. Mich.	January 17, 1910	January 31, 1910	January 31, 1910	October 3, 1911	Elevated
13	Howard Clark Hollister	S.D. Ohio	February 24, 1910	March 7, 1910	March 7, 1910	September 24, 1919	–
14	John Carter Rose	D. Md.	March 25, 1910	April 4, 1910	April 4, 1910	December 26, 1922	Elevated
15	Carl L. Rasch	D. Mont.	April 26, 1910	May 2, 1910	May 2, 1910	October 15, 1911	–
16	Gordon J. Russell	E.D. Tex.	May 27, 1910	June 6, 1910	June 6, 1910	September 14, 1919	–
17	Arba Seymour Van Valkenburgh	W.D. Mo.	June 14, 1910	June 21, 1910	June 21, 1910	March 18, 1925	Elevated
18	John Milton Killits	N.D. Ohio	June 21, 1910	June 24, 1910	June 24, 1910	October 6, 1928	September 13, 1938
19	Van Vechten Veeder	E.D.N.Y.	January 13, 1911	January 26, 1911	January 26, 1911	December 31, 1917	–
20	Frank H. Rudkin	E.D. Wash.	January 17, 1911	January 31, 1911	January 31, 1911	January 17, 1923	Elevated
21	Alexis C. Angell	E.D. Mich.	February 25, 1911	March 2, 1911	March 2, 1911	June 1, 1912	–
22	Clarence W. Sessions	W.D. Mich.	February 25, 1911	March 2, 1911	March 2, 1911	April 1, 1931	–
23	Charles B. Witmer	M.D. Pa.	February 20, 1911	March 2, 1911	March 2, 1911	April 7, 1925	–
24	William Louis Day	N.D. Ohio	April 6, 1911	May 9, 1911	May 9, 1911	May 1, 1914	–
25	James Douglas Elliott	D.S.D.	May 25, 1911	June 7, 1911	June 7, 1911	January 30, 1933	–
26	Henry Augustus Middleton Smith	D.S.C. / W.D.S.C. E.D.S.C.	May 25, 1911	June 7, 1911	June 7, 1911	November 23, 1923	November 23, 1924
27	Frank A. Youmans	W.D. Ark.	May 29, 1911	June 20, 1911	June 20, 1911	April 11, 1932	–
28	William Hayes Pope	D.N.M.	January 22, 1912	February 20, 1912	February 20, 1912	September 13, 1916	–
29	Julius Marshuetz Mayer	S.D.N.Y.	February 19, 1912	February 26, 1912	February 26, 1912	October 13, 1921	Elevated
30	George M. Bourquin	D. Mont.	February 13, 1912	March 8, 1912	March 8, 1912	March 9, 1934	November 15, 1958
31	Ferdinand August Geiger	E.D. Wis.	February 19, 1912	March 20, 1912	March 20, 1912	May 22, 1939	–
32	Edward E. Cushman	W.D. Wash.	April 9, 1912	May 1, 1912	May 1, 1912	November 3, 1939	January 25, 1944
33	Joseph Whitaker Thompson	E.D. Pa.	June 5, 1912	June 16, 1912	July 16, 1912	February 3, 1931	Elevated
34	Arthur J. Tuttle	E.D. Mich.	August 2, 1912	August 6, 1912	August 6, 1912	December 2, 1944	–
35	James Madison Morton Jr.	D. Mass.	August 9, 1912	August 12, 1912	August 12, 1912	January 19, 1932	Elevated
36	John Moses Cheney	S.D. Fla.	July 25, 1912 (Note: Renominated on December 3, 1912.)	–	August 26, 1912	March 3, 1913	–
37	Clinton Woodbury Howard	W.D. Wash.	August 19, 1912	–	August 26, 1912	March 3, 1913	–
38	Richard Elihu Sloan	D. Ariz.	March 1, 1912	–	August 26, 1912	March 3, 1913	–

== Specialty courts ==
=== United States Commerce Court ===
#	Judge	Nomination date	Confirmation date	Began active service	Ended active service
1	Martin Augustine Knapp	December 12, 1910	December 20, 1910	December 20, 1910	December 13, 1913
2	Robert W. Archbald	December 12, 1910	January 31, 1911	January 31, 1911	January 13, 1913
3	John Emmett Carland	December 12, 1910	January 31, 1911	January 31, 1911	December 13, 1913
4	Julian Mack	December 12, 1910	January 31, 1911	January 31, 1911	December 13, 1913
5	William Henry Hunt	December 12, 1910	January 31, 1911	February 8, 1911	December 13, 1913

=== United States Court of Customs Appeals ===
#	Judge	Nomination date	Confirmation date	Began active service	Ended active service	Ended senior status
1	Orion M. Barber	January 5, 1910 (Note: Originally nominated on January 5, 1910. Nomination was withdrawn on February 22, 1910 and renominated on March 9, 1910.)	March 30, 1910	March 30, 1910	September 30, 1928	March 28, 1930
2	Marion De Vries	January 5, 1910	March 30, 1910	March 30, 1910	June 28, 1921	–
3	William Henry Hunt	January 5, 1910	March 30, 1910	March 30, 1910	January 31, 1911	Elevated
4	Robert Morris Montgomery	March 9, 1910	March 30, 1910	March 30, 1910	June 27, 1920	–
5	James Francis Smith	January 5, 1910	March 30, 1910	March 30, 1910	June 29, 1928	–
6	George Ewing Martin	February 1, 1911	February 8, 1911	February 8, 1911	January 4, 1923	–

=== Board of General Appraisers ===
#	Judge	Nomination date	Confirmation date	Began active service	Ended active service
1	Samuel B. Cooper	May 16, 1910	May 24, 1910	May 26, 1910	August 21, 1918

== Notes ==
Renominations

== Sources ==
- Federal Judicial Center
