= Richard G. Stearns =

American judge (born 1944)

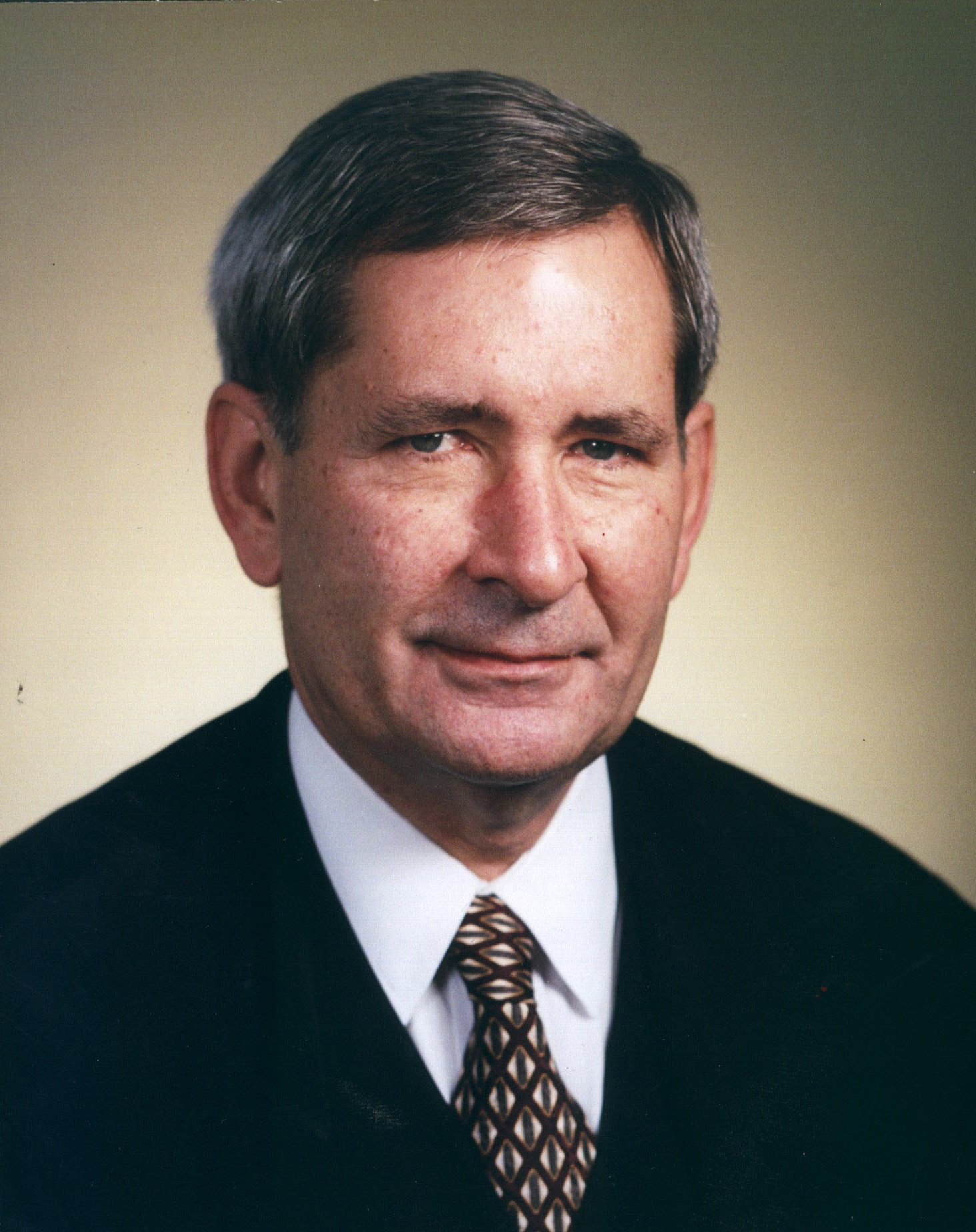
- Stearns in 2013

Judge of the United States District Court for the District of Massachusetts
- Incumbent
- Assumed office November 24, 1993
- Appointed by: Bill Clinton
- Preceded by: John J. McNaught

Personal details
- Born: 1944 (age 81–82) Los Angeles, California, U.S.
- Education: Stanford University (BA); Balliol College, Oxford (MLitt); Harvard University (JD)

Richard Gaylore Stearns (born 1944) is an American lawyer who serves as a United States district judge of the United States District Court for the District of Massachusetts.

== Early life and education ==
Stearns was born in Los Angeles. He received a Bachelor of Arts from Stanford University in 1968 then a Master of Letters in political philosophy from Balliol College, Oxford, as a Rhodes Scholar, in 1971. He obtained a Juris Doctor from Harvard Law School in 1976.

== Career ==
Stearns worked on the George McGovern presidential campaign, 1972, and later became a special assistant to McGovern from 1972 to 1973. He was a speech writer in the Lieutenant Governor of Massachusetts office from 1975 to 1976. He worked in the Norfolk County (Massachusetts) District Attorney's office from 1976 to 1982. He was an assistant United States attorney of the District of Massachusetts from 1982 to 1990. He was an Associate Justice of the Superior Court of Massachusetts from 1990 to 1993.

=== Federal judicial service ===
On October 27, 1993, Stearns was nominated by President Bill Clinton to a seat on the United States District Court for the District of Massachusetts vacated by John J. McNaught. The United States Senate confirmed Stearns on November 20, 1993, and he received his commission on November 24, 1993. Clinton had originally wanted to appoint Stearns Director of the Federal Bureau of Investigation.

=== Notable cases ===
On August 5, 2025, Stearns ruled that the Trump administration cannot redirect $4 billion in funds intended for natural disaster prevention projects.

On August 13, 2026 he dismissed the Trump administration’s lawsuit against Harvard University for alleged antisemitism.

== See also ==
- List of United States federal judges by longevity of service

Legal offices
Preceded by John J. McNaught	Judge of the United States District Court for the District of Massachusetts; 1993–present	Incumbent
