= O. Rogeriee Thompson =

American federal judge (born 1951)

Rogeriee Thompson

Senior Judge of the United States Court of Appeals for the First Circuit
- Incumbent
- Assumed office September 21, 2022

Judge of the United States Court of Appeals for the First Circuit
- In office March 30, 2010 – September 21, 2022
- Appointed by: Barack Obama
- Preceded by: Bruce M. Selya
- Succeeded by: Lara Montecalvo

Personal details
- Born: August 8, 1951 (age 75) Anderson, South Carolina, U.S.
- Education: Brown University (BA); Boston University (JD)

Ojetta Rogeriee Thompson (born August 8, 1951) is an American lawyer and jurist who serves as a senior United States circuit judge of the United States Court of Appeals for the First Circuit. She was appointed in 2010 by President Barack Obama. Before becoming a federal judge, Thompson was a judge of the Rhode Island District Court from 1988 to 1997 and of the Rhode Island Superior Court from 1997 to 2010.

== Early life and education ==
Thompson was born in segregated Anderson, South Carolina, and grew up in Greenville, South Carolina. She attended Scarsdale High School in Scarsdale, New York, under the auspices of the Student Transfer and Exchange Program (STEP), graduating in 1969. She came to Rhode Island to attend Pembroke College, which was the coordinate women's college for Brown University. Thompson earned a Bachelor of Arts degree from Brown University in 1973 and a Juris Doctor from the Boston University School of Law in 1976.

== Professional career ==
Thompson began her career working as a cashier at the Providence Civic Center in 1973. In 1975 she worked as a law clerk for the Harvard Legal Aid Bureau. In 1974 Thompson started out as a legal intern for Rhode Island Legal Services and then returned in 1976 as Senior Staff Attorney and Family Law Manager until 1979. From 1979 to 1980 she was an Associate for the law firm of McKinnon and Fortunato. In 1980, Thompson became the Assistant City Solicitor for Providence, Rhode Island, and held this position until 1982. Also in 1980, Thompson was a solo practitioner until 1984 when she opened a law firm in South Providence while raising a family with her husband, Rhode Island District Court judge William Clifton. In 1988, Thompson was appointed to the Rhode Island District Court by Governor Edward D. DiPrete. In 1997, she was elevated to the Rhode Island Superior Court by Governor Lincoln Almond.

== Federal judicial career ==
On April 13, 2009, United States Senators Jack Reed and Sheldon Whitehouse announced that they were recommending that President Obama nominate Thompson to the United States Court of Appeals for the First Circuit, to fill the seat left vacant by First Circuit Judge Bruce M. Selya's transition to senior status at the end of 2006. On October 6, 2009, Obama formally nominated Thompson to the seat on the First Circuit. She was confirmed by the Senate on March 17, 2010 by a 98–0 vote. She received her commission on March 30, 2010 and became the first African American and the second woman to serve in this position. She assumed senior status on September 21, 2022.

In August 2017, Thompson dissented when the en banc circuit rejected a lawsuit seeking to give Puerto Ricans the right to vote in U.S. federal elections. In July 2020 Thompson was part of an appellate court decision that vacated the death sentence and overturned three of the firearm convictions of Boston Marathon bomber Dzhokhar Tsarnaev, and referred the matter back to the lower courts. The appellate court cited errors in the sentencing proceedings that found Dzhokhar guilty and condemned him to death; however, the appellate court upheld the life sentence for Dzhokhar. Tsarnaev's death sentence was reinstated by the U.S. Supreme Court on March 4, 2022.

== Personal life ==
Thompson lives in Cranston, Rhode Island. She has three children.

== See also ==
- List of African-American federal judges
- List of African-American jurists
- List of first women lawyers and judges in Rhode Island

Legal offices
Preceded by Bruce M. Selya	Judge of the United States Court of Appeals for the First Circuit; 2010–2022	Succeeded by Lara Montecalvo
