= Michael Ponsor =

American judge (born 1946)

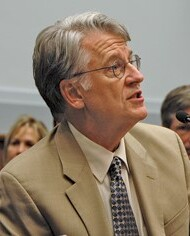
- Ponsor in 2010

Senior Judge of the United States District Court for the District of Massachusetts
- Incumbent
- Assumed office August 15, 2011

Judge of the United States District Court for the District of Massachusetts
- In office February 14, 1994 – August 15, 2011
- Appointed by: Bill Clinton
- Preceded by: Frank Harlan Freedman
- Succeeded by: Mark G. Mastroianni

Magistrate Judge of the United States District Court for the District of Massachusetts
- In office 1984–1994

Personal details
- Born: Michael Adrian Ponsor; August 13, 1946 (age 80) Chicago, Illinois, U.S.
- Education: Harvard University (BA); Pembroke College, Oxford (MA); Yale University (JD)

Michael Adrian Ponsor (born August 13, 1946) is an American judge and writer. He is a senior United States district judge of the United States District Court for the District of Massachusetts, having been confirmed to the federal bench in 1994 and taken senior status in 2011. He serves in the court's western region, in the city of Springfield.

== Education ==
Ponsor graduated from Harvard College with a Bachelor of Arts degree in 1969, and received a Rhodes Scholarship, studying at Pembroke College, Oxford, from which he obtained a Master of Arts degree in 1971. He graduated from Yale Law School with a Juris Doctor in 1975.

== Career ==
Ponsor served as a law clerk to Judge Joseph L. Tauro of the United States District Court for the District of Massachusetts from 1975 to 1976. He was in private practice in Boston, Massachusetts from 1976 to 1978 and in Amherst, Massachusetts from 1978 to 1983. He was an adjunct professor at Yale Law School from 1989 to 1991 and Western New England University School of Law since 1988. He served as a United States magistrate judge of the United States District Court for the District of Massachusetts from 1984 to 1994.

=== Federal judicial service ===
Ponsor was nominated to be a United States district judge of the United States District Court for the District of Massachusetts by President Bill Clinton on November 19, 1993, to a seat vacated by Judge Frank H. Freedman. He was confirmed by the United States Senate on February 10, 1994, and received his commission on February 14, 1994. He assumed senior status on August 15, 2011.

From 2000–2001, Ponsor presided over the trial of Kristen Gilbert, the first death penalty case in Massachusetts in a half-century. Gilbert was convicted but was spared a death sentence by the jury.

Ponsor was named as the 2015 recipient of the Golden Pen Award from the Legal Writing Institute.

In 2024, Ponsor wrote an op-ed in The New York Times criticizing Supreme Court Justice Samuel Alito for an upside-down American flag and a Pine Tree Flag that flew outside of his residences, both of which were associated with the attempts to overturn the 2020 United States presidential election. Republican activist and lawyer Mike Davis filed a complaint about the column, and Chief Judge Albert Diaz of the United States Court of Appeals for the Fourth Circuit concluded that Ponsor's column violated the federal judiciary's conduct code. The complaint was resolved when Ponsor apologized for the column. The controversy's handling drew additional criticism: Robert Minkoff, vice president of the New York County Lawyers' Association, said that while it was inadvisable for judges to engage in public conflict, Ponsor should not have been compelled to apologize for expressing his views, especially as Alito, as a Supreme Court justice, was not bound to the same code of conduct and was permitted to freely comment on the matter.

== Novels ==
Ponsor has written a trilogy of legal thrillers about a fictional federal judge named David S. Norcross. In an interview, Ponsor said he had aspired to be a novelist in his early years.

=== The Hanging Judge ===
Ponsor's debut novel, The Hanging Judge, was released in December 2013 by Open Road Integrated Media. The novel follows Judge David S. Norcross as he presides over a federal capital trial, and Ponsor was inspired to write it after presiding over the Kristen Gilbert trial. The novel appeared on The New York Times Best Seller List.

=== The One-Eyed Judge ===
Ponsor's second novel, The One-Eyed Judge was released in June 2017, and is the second book in the Judge Norcross Novels.

=== Point of Order ===
A third Judge Norcross story, Point of Order, was published in 2024.

Legal offices
Preceded by Frank Harlan Freedman	Judge of the United States District Court for the District of Massachusetts; 1994–2011	Succeeded by Mark G. Mastroianni
