= Ghen v. Rich =

1881 property law case

- Court: United States District Court for the District of Massachusetts
- Decided: April 23 1881

Holding
- It was unreasonable to expect the whaler to wait for the whale to return to the surface, and therefore the whaler who killed the whale retained his claim to the property.

Court membership
- Judge sitting: Thomas Leverett Nelson

Ghen v. Rich, 8 F. 159 (1881), is an American property law case from the United States District Court for the District of Massachusetts involving ownership of a dead whale. The case is frequently used to illustrate the difficulties of establishing "possession" and ownership under the common law.

== Parties ==
- Ghen was a whaler who operated out of Massachusetts. He killed the whale in question.
- Ellis was the person who found the killed whale on the beach and auctioned it.
- Rich was the buyer of the whale from Ellis; Rich processed the whale into oil and other by-products.

== Facts and holding ==
This 1881 case decided ownership of a dead finback whale (Balaenoptera physalus). The whale was killed by libellant (plaintiff) Ghen's bomb lance. The whale washed up on the shore 17 miles from Cape Cod and was found by Ellis, who then auctioned off the whale to Rich, the defendant. Finback whales generally sink after being killed, and it takes time for the whale to resurface. According to the custom of the time, dead whales were retrieved from the shore after 2–3 days, and the finder identified the whaling company that had made the kill from the unique mark of the bomb lance. The finder would then notify the whaling company by communicating with Provincetown and in return receive a finder's fee. In this case, it was unclear whether the whaler or the person who discovered the washed up whale owned the animal.

The U.S. District Court of Massachusetts decided that it was unreasonable to expect the whaler to wait for the whale to return to the surface and therefore the whaler who killed the whale retained his claim to the property according to the custom under the prior common law and case law. The trial judge found "If the fisherman does all that is possible to do to make the animal his own, that would seem to be sufficient [to give that fisherman full ownership]." Request for trover of the whale was granted to Ghen.

== Images ==
Bomb lance whaling harpoon

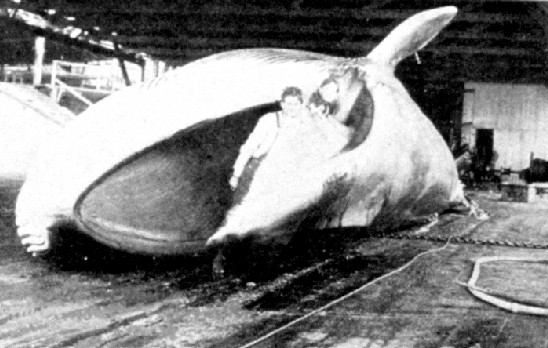
A finback whale caught circa 1912

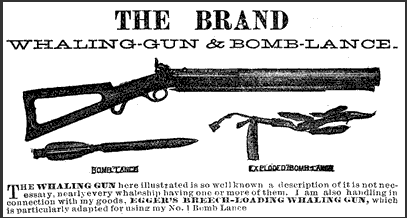
Whaling gun at the New Bedford Whaling Museum

== See also ==
- Pierson v. Post
