= Arthur Daniel Healey =

American judge (1889-1948)

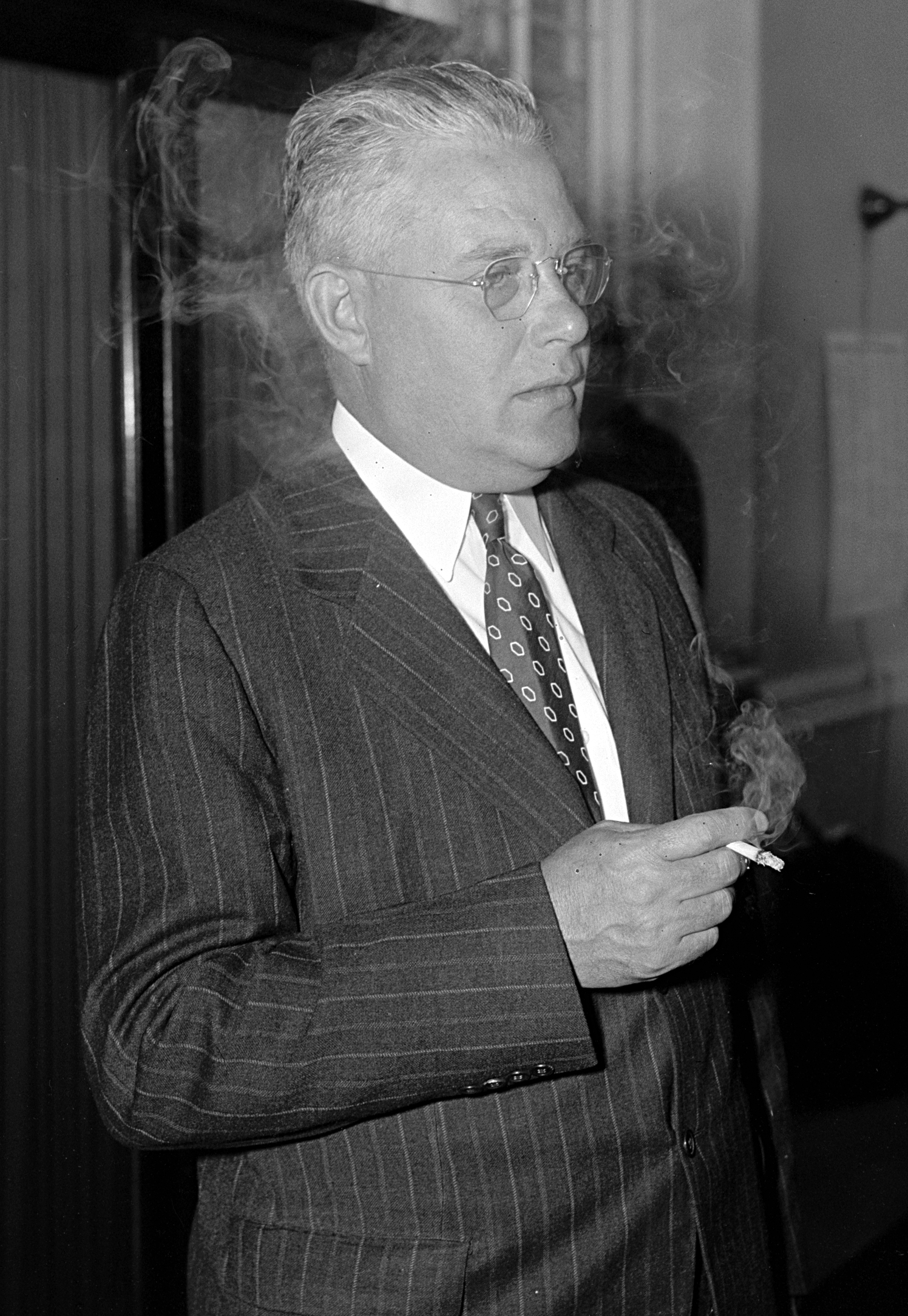
- Democratic United States Representative

Judge of the United States District Court for the District of Massachusetts
- In office December 19, 1941 – September 16, 1948
- Appointed by: Franklin D. Roosevelt
- Preceded by: Elisha Hume Brewster
- Succeeded by: William T. McCarthy

Member of the U.S. House of Representatives from Massachusetts's 8th district
- In office March 4, 1933 – August 3, 1942
- Preceded by: Frederick W. Dallinger
- Succeeded by: Angier Goodwin

Personal details
- Born: Arthur Daniel Healey; December 29, 1889 Somerville, Massachusetts, US
- Died: September 16, 1948 (aged 58) Somerville, Massachusetts, US
- Resting place: Oak Grove Cemetery; Medford, Massachusetts, US
- Party: Democratic
- Education: Dartmouth College; Boston University School of Law (LL.B.)

Arthur Daniel Healey (December 29, 1889 – September 16, 1948) was a Democratic United States Representative from Massachusetts from 1933 to 1942 and a United States district judge of the United States District Court for the District of Massachusetts.

== Education and career ==
Born in Somerville, Massachusetts, Healey attended public schools and graduated from Somerville Latin School in 1908. He attended Dartmouth College in 1909 and 1910. Healey received a Bachelor of Laws from Boston University School of Law in 1913, was admitted to the bar in 1914, and engaged in the private practice of law in Boston from 1914 to 1917. On August 9, 1917, he enlisted in the United States Army and rose through the ranks to second lieutenant in the Quartermaster Corps. He was discharged on March 6, 1919. He then returned to his law practice until 1933.

== Congressional service ==
Healey was elected as a Democrat to an open seat for Massachusetts's 8th congressional district beginning with the 73rd United States Congress, taking office on March 4, 1933. He was returned to the four succeeding Congresses. His name was attached to one significant piece of New Deal legislation, the 1936 Walsh–Healey Act, which regulated hours and working conditions for employees working on government contracts. In 1938, he became one of the initial members of the newly created House Un-American Activities Committee.

== Federal judicial service ==
Healey served in Congress until he resigned to accept an appointment as a judge of the United States District Court for the District of Massachusetts. President Franklin D. Roosevelt nominated Healey on December 1, 1941, to the seat on that court which had been vacated by Judge Elisha Hume Brewster. Healey was confirmed by the United States Senate on December 16, 1941, and received his commission on December 19, 1941, but remained in Congress until August 3, 1942. Healey thereafter served on the court until his death in Somerville on September 16, 1948. He is buried in Oak Grove Cemetery in Medford, Massachusetts. The Arthur D. Healey School in Somerville is a public elementary school named after him.

== See also ==
- List of members of the House Un-American Activities Committee

== Sources ==
- United States Congress. "Arthur Daniel Healey (id: H000423)". Biographical Directory of the United States Congress.

U.S. House of Representatives
Preceded by Frederick W. Dallinger	Member of the U.S. House of Representatives from Massachusetts's 8th congressional district 1933–1942	Succeeded by Angier Goodwin
Legal offices
Preceded by Elisha Hume Brewster	Judge of the United States District Court for the District of Massachusetts; 1941–1948	Succeeded by William T. McCarthy
