= Lara Montecalvo =

American judge (born 1974)

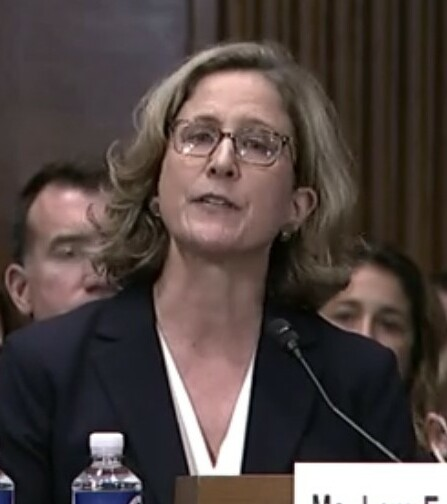

Judge of the United States Court of Appeals for the First Circuit
- Incumbent
- Assumed office September 20, 2022
- Appointed by: Joe Biden
- Preceded by: O. Rogeriee Thompson

Personal details
- Born: Lara Elizabeth Ewens; 1974 (age 51–52) Syracuse, New York, U.S.
- Education: Swarthmore College (BA); Boston College (JD)

Lara Elizabeth Montecalvo (née Ewens; born 1974) is an American lawyer from Rhode Island who has served as a United States circuit judge of the United States Court of Appeals for the First Circuit since 2022.

== Early life and education ==
Born Lara Elizabeth Ewens in 1974 in Syracuse, New York, Montecalvo received her Bachelor of Arts from Swarthmore College in 1996 and her Juris Doctor from Boston College Law School in 2000. She is married to Craig Montecalvo, and they have one child.

== Career ==
Montecalvo started her legal career as a trial attorney in the United States Department of Justice Tax Division from 2000 to 2004. From 2004 to 2020, she served as an assistant public defender in the Rhode Island Public Defender's Office; she served in multiple roles within the office including as a trial attorney from 2004 to 2010, as an appellate attorney from 2010 to 2014 and as chief of the appellate division from 2014 to 2020. In March 2020, Montecalvo was nominated by Rhode Island Governor Gina Raimondo to serve as the Public Defender of Rhode Island.

=== Federal judicial service ===
On April 27, 2022, President Joe Biden announced his intent to nominate Montecalvo to serve as a United States circuit judge for the United States Court of Appeals for the First Circuit. Her nomination was praised by Senators Jack Reed and Sheldon Whitehouse. On May 19, 2022, her nomination was sent to the Senate. President Biden nominated Montecalvo to the seat to be vacated by Judge O. Rogeriee Thompson, who announced her intent to assume senior status upon confirmation of a successor. On May 25, 2022, a hearing on her nomination was held before the Senate Judiciary Committee. On June 16, 2022, her nomination was reported out of committee by a 12–10 vote. On September 13, 2022, the United States Senate invoked cloture on her nomination by a 51–45 vote. On September 14, 2022, her nomination was confirmed by a 52–47 vote. Montecalvo was the sixth public defender nominated by President Biden to be confirmed as a United States circuit judge, handing Biden the record for placing the most nominees with that kind of experience onto the circuit courts. She received her judicial commission on September 20, 2022.

== Personal life ==
Montecalvo lives in Barrington, Rhode Island, with her husband, Craig V. Montecalvo, and their son.

Legal offices
| Preceded by O. Rogeriee Thompson | Judge of the United States Court of Appeals for the First Circuit; 2022–present | Incumbent |
