= George F. Garrity =

American attorney (1895–1967)

United States Attorney for the District of Massachusetts
- In office 1949–1953
- Preceded by: William T. McCarthy
- Succeeded by: Anthony Julian
- In office 1946–1947
- Preceded by: Edmund J. Brandon
- Succeeded by: William T. McCarthy

Personal details
- Born: March 17, 1895; Plymouth, Massachusetts, US
- Died: February 27, 1967 (aged 71); Brockton, Massachusetts, US
- Occupation: Attorney

George F. Garrity (March 17, 1895 – February 27, 1967) was an American attorney who served as the United States Attorney for the District of Massachusetts from 1946 to 1947 and again from 1949 to 1953.
