= United States District Court for the District of Massachusetts =

United States district court

Coordinates: 42.354°N 71.047°W

- (D. Mass.)
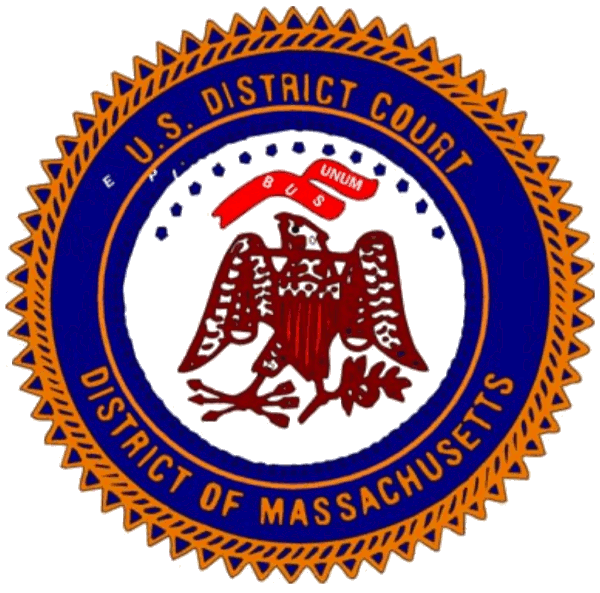

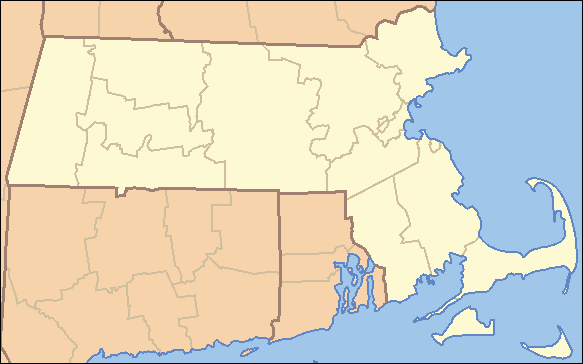
- Location: John Joseph Moakley U.S. Courthouse (Boston) More locations: Harold D. Donohue Federal Building and U.S. Courthouse (Worcester); Springfield; New Bedford
- Appeals to: First Circuit
- Established: September 24, 1789
- Judges: 13
- Chief Judge: Denise J. Casper

Officers of the court
- U.S. Attorney: Leah Foley
- U.S. Marshal: Brian A. Kyes
- www.mad.uscourts.gov

The United States District Court for the District of Massachusetts (in case citations, D. Mass.) is the federal district court whose territorial jurisdiction is the Commonwealth of Massachusetts, United States. The first court session was held in Boston in 1789. The second term was held in Salem in 1790 and court session locations alternated between the two cities until 1813. That year, Boston became the court's permanent home. A western division was opened in Springfield in 1979 and a central division was opened in Worcester in 1987. The court's main building is the John Joseph Moakley Federal Courthouse on Fan Pier in South Boston.

Appeals from the District of Massachusetts are heard by the United States Court of Appeals for the First Circuit, also located in the Moakley courthouse (except for patent claims and claims against the U.S. government under the Tucker Act, which are appealed to the Federal Circuit).

== Jurisdiction ==
The District of Massachusetts has three court divisions:

The Eastern Division, covering Barnstable, Bristol, Dukes, Essex, Middlesex, Nantucket, Norfolk, Plymouth, and Suffolk counties. Cases filed in the Eastern Division are heard in Boston.

The Central Division, covering Worcester county. Cases filed in the Central Division are heard in Worcester.

The Western Division, covering Berkshire, Franklin, Hampden, and Hampshire counties. Cases filed in the Western Division are heard in Springfield.

== U.S. Attorney's Office ==
The United States Attorney's Office for the District of Massachusetts represents the United States in civil and criminal litigation in the courts. As of January 20, 2025 the U.S. attorney is Leah Foley.

== Federal Public Defender's Office ==
The Federal Public Defender's Office represents individuals who cannot afford to hire a lawyer in federal criminal cases and related matters. The office is assigned to cases by the district courts in three districts (New Hampshire, Rhode Island, and Massachusetts), and by the U.S. Court of Appeals for the First Circuit.

== Current judges ==
As of July 4, 2026:

| # | Title | Judge | Duty station | Born | Term of service | | | Appointed by |
| # | Title | Judge | Duty station | Born | Active | Chief | Senior | Appointed by |
|---|---|---|---|---|---|---|---|---|
| 43 | Chief Judge | Denise J. Casper | Boston | 1968 | 2010–present | 2025–present | — | Obama |
| 38 | District Judge | Richard G. Stearns | Boston | 1944 | 1993–present | — | — | Clinton |
| 45 | District Judge | Indira Talwani | Boston | 1960 | 2014–present | — | — | Obama |
| 46 | District Judge | Mark G. Mastroianni | Springfield | 1964 | 2014–present | — | — | Obama |
| 47 | District Judge | Leo T. Sorokin | Boston | 1961 | 2014–present | — | — | Obama |
| 48 | District Judge | Allison D. Burroughs | Boston | 1961 | 2014–present | — | — | Obama |
| 49 | District Judge | Angel Kelley | Boston | 1967 | 2021–present | — | — | Biden |
| 50 | District Judge | Margaret R. Guzman | Worcester | 1960 | 2023–present | — | — | Biden |
| 51 | District Judge | Myong J. Joun | Boston | 1971 | 2023–present | — | — | Biden |
| 52 | District Judge | Julia Kobick | Boston | 1983 | 2023–present | — | — | Biden |
| 53 | District Judge | Brian E. Murphy | Boston | 1979 | 2024–present | — | — | Biden |
| 54 | District Judge | vacant | — | — | — | — | — | — |
| 55 | District Judge | vacant | — | — | — | — | — | — |
| 31 | Senior Judge | William G. Young | Boston | 1940 | 1985–2021 | 1999–2005 | 2021–present | Reagan |
| 33 | Senior Judge | Douglas P. Woodlock | Boston | 1947 | 1986–2015 | — | 2015–present | Reagan |
| 35 | Senior Judge | Nathaniel M. Gorton | Boston | 1938 | 1992–2025 | — | 2025–present | G.H.W. Bush |
| 37 | Senior Judge | Patti B. Saris | Boston | 1951 | 1993–2024 | 2013–2019 | 2024–present | Clinton |
| 40 | Senior Judge | Michael Ponsor | Springfield | 1946 | 1994–2011 | — | 2011–present | Clinton |
| 41 | Senior Judge | George A. O'Toole Jr. | Boston | 1947 | 1995–2018 | — | 2018–present | Clinton |
| 42 | Senior Judge | F. Dennis Saylor IV | Boston | 1955 | 2004–2025 | 2020–2025 | 2025–present | G.W. Bush |

== Vacancies and pending nominations ==
| Seat | Prior judge's duty station | Seat last held by | Vacancy reason | Date of vacancy | Nominee | Date of nomination |
|---|---|---|---|---|---|---|
| 13 | Boston | Nathaniel M. Gorton | Senior status | May 31, 2025 | – | – |
| 7 | Boston | F. Dennis Saylor IV | Senior status | July 31, 2025 | – | – |

== Former judges ==
| # | Judge | Born–died | Active service | Chief Judge | Senior status | Appointed by | Reason for termination |
|---|---|---|---|---|---|---|---|
| 1 | John Lowell | 1743–1802 | 1789–1801 | — | — | Washington | elevation |
| 2 | John Davis | 1761–1847 | 1801–1841 | — | — | J. Adams | resignation |
| 3 | Peleg Sprague | 1793–1880 | 1841–1865 | — | — | Tyler | resignation |
| 4 | John Lowell | 1824–1897 | 1865–1879 | — | — | Lincoln | elevation |
| 5 | Thomas Leverett Nelson | 1827–1897 | 1879–1897 | — | — | Hayes | death |
| 6 | Francis Cabot Lowell | 1855–1911 | 1898–1905 | — | — | McKinley | elevation |
| 7 | Frederic Dodge | 1847–1927 | 1905–1912 | — | — | T. Roosevelt | elevation |
| 8 | James Madison Morton Jr. | 1869–1940 | 1912–1932 | — | — | Taft | elevation |
| 9 | Elisha Hume Brewster | 1871–1946 | 1922–1941 | — | 1941–1946 | Harding | death |
| 10 | James Arnold Lowell | 1869–1933 | 1922–1933 | — | — | Harding | death |
| 11 | Hugh Dean McLellan | 1876–1953 | 1932–1941 | — | — | Hoover | resignation |
| 12 | George Clinton Sweeney | 1895–1966 | 1935–1966 | 1948–1965 | 1966 | F. Roosevelt | death |
| 13 | Francis Ford | 1882–1975 | 1938–1972 | — | 1972–1975 | F. Roosevelt | death |
| 14 | Arthur Daniel Healey | 1889–1948 | 1941–1948 | — | — | F. Roosevelt | death |
| 15 | Charles Edward Wyzanski Jr. | 1906–1986 | 1941–1971 | 1965–1971 | 1971–1986 | F. Roosevelt | death |
| 16 | William T. McCarthy | 1885–1964 | 1949–1960 | — | 1960–1964 | Truman | death |
| 17 | Bailey Aldrich | 1907–2002 | 1954–1959 | — | — | Eisenhower | elevation |
| 18 | Anthony Julian | 1902–1984 | 1959–1972 | 1971–1972 | 1972–1984 | Eisenhower | death |
| 19 | Andrew A. Caffrey | 1920–1993 | 1960–1986 (Note: Recess appointment; formally nominated on January 10, 1961, confirmed by the United States Senate on August 9, 1961, and received commission on August 16, 1961) | 1972–1986 | 1986–1993 | Eisenhower (Note: Judge Caffrey was given a recess appointment by President Eisenhower.); Kennedy (Note: Judge Caffrey was nominated by President Eisenhower but was appointed to the Court by (i.e., received his commission from) President Kennedy.) | death |
| 20 | W. Arthur Garrity Jr. | 1920–1999 | 1966–1985 | — | 1985–1999 | L. Johnson | death |
| 21 | Frank Jerome Murray | 1904–1995 | 1967–1977 | — | 1977–1995 | L. Johnson | death |
| 22 | Levin H. Campbell | 1927–present | 1971–1972 | — | — | Nixon | elevation |
| 23 | Frank Harlan Freedman | 1924–2003 | 1972–1992 | 1986–1992 | 1992–2003 | Nixon | death |
| 24 | Joseph L. Tauro | 1931–2018 | 1972–2013 | 1992–1999 | 2013–2018 | Nixon | death |
| 25 | Walter Jay Skinner | 1927–2005 | 1973–1992 | — | 1992–2005 | Nixon | death |
| 26 | A. David Mazzone | 1928–2004 | 1978–1993 | — | 1993–2004 | Carter | death |
| 27 | Robert Keeton | 1919–2007 | 1979–2003 | — | 2003–2006 | Carter | retirement |
| 28 | John J. McNaught | 1921–1994 | 1979–1991 | — | — | Carter | retirement |
| 29 | David Sutherland Nelson | 1933–1998 | 1979–1991 | — | 1991–1998 | Carter | death |
| 30 | Rya W. Zobel | 1931–2026 | 1979–2014 | — | 2014–2026 | Carter | death |
| 32 | Mark L. Wolf | 1946–present | 1985–2013 | 2006–2012 | 2013–2025 | Reagan | retirement |
| 34 | Edward F. Harrington | 1933–2025 | 1988–2001 | — | 2001–2025 | Reagan | death |
| 36 | Reginald C. Lindsay | 1945–2009 | 1993–2009 | — | — | Clinton | death |
| 39 | Nancy Gertner | 1946–present | 1994–2011 | — | 2011 | Clinton | retirement |
| 44 | Timothy S. Hillman | 1948–present | 2012–2022 | — | 2022–2024 | Obama | retirement |

== Chief judges ==
Chief Judge
| Sweeney | 1948–1965 |
| Wyzanski | 1965–1971 |
| Julian | 1971–1972 |
| Caffrey | 1972–1986 |
| Freedman | 1986–1992 |
| Tauro | 1992–1999 |
| Young | 1999–2005 |
| Wolf | 2005–2012 |
| Saris | 2013–2019 |
| Saylor | 2020–2025 |
| Casper | 2025–present |

Chief judges have administrative responsibilities with respect to their district court. Unlike the Supreme Court, where one justice is specifically nominated to be chief, the office of chief judge rotates among the district court judges. To be chief, a judge must have been in active service on the court for at least one year, be under the age of 65, and have not previously served as chief judge.

A vacancy is filled by the judge highest in seniority among the group of qualified judges. The chief judge serves for a term of seven years, or until age 70, whichever occurs first. The age restrictions are waived if no members of the court would otherwise be qualified for the position.

When the office was created in 1948, the chief judge was the longest-serving judge who had not elected to retire, on what has since 1958 been known as senior status, or declined to serve as chief judge. After August 6, 1959, judges could not become or remain chief after turning 70 years old. The current rules have been in operation since October 1, 1982.

== Succession of seats ==
Seat 1
Seat established on September 24, 1789 by 1 Stat. 73
| John A. Lowell | 1789–1801 |
| Davis | 1801–1841 |
| Sprague | 1841–1865 |
| John Lowell | 1865–1879 |
| T. Nelson | 1879–1897 |
| F. Lowell | 1898–1905 |
| Dodge | 1905–1912 |
| Morton, Jr. | 1912–1932 |
| McLellan | 1932–1941 |
| Wyzanski, Jr. | 1941–1971 |
| Campbell | 1971–1972 |
| Freedman | 1972–1992 |
| Ponsor | 1994–2011 |
| Mastroianni | 2014–present |

Seat 2
Seat established on September 14, 1922 by 42 Stat. 837 (temporary)
Seat made permanent on August 19, 1935 by 49 Stat. 659
| Brewster | 1922–1941 |
| Healey | 1941–1948 |
| McCarthy | 1949–1960 |
| Caffrey | 1961–1986 |
| Harrington | 1988–2001 |
Seat abolished on March 1, 2001 (temporary judgeship expired)

Seat 3
Seat established on September 14, 1922 by 42 Stat. 837 (temporary)
Seat made permanent on August 19, 1935 by 49 Stat. 659
| James A. Lowell | 1922–1933 |
| Sweeney | 1935–1966 |
| Murray | 1967–1977 |
| Mazzone | 1978–1993 |
| Gertner | 1994–2011 |
| Hillman | 2012–2022 |
| Guzman | 2023–present |

Seat 4
Seat established on May 31, 1938 by 52 Stat. 584 (temporary)
Seat made permanent on November 21, 1941 by 55 Stat. 773
| Ford | 1938–1972 |
| Tauro | 1972–2013 |
| Sorokin | 2014–present |

Seat 5
Seat established on February 10, 1954 by 68 Stat. 68
| Aldrich | 1954–1959 |
| Julian | 1959–1972 |
| Skinner | 1973–1992 |
| Saris | 1993–2024 |
| Murphy | 2024–present |

Seat 6
Seat established on May 19, 1961 by 75 Stat. 80
| Garrity, Jr. | 1966–1985 |
| Woodlock | 1986–2015 |
| Kelley | 2021–present |

Seat 7
Seat established on October 20, 1978 by 92 Stat. 1629
| Keeton | 1979–2003 |
| Saylor IV | 2004–2025 |
| vacant | 2025–present |

Seat 8
Seat established on October 20, 1978 by 92 Stat. 1629
| McNaught | 1979–1991 |
| Stearns | 1993–present |

Seat 9
Seat established on October 20, 1978 by 92 Stat. 1629
| D. Nelson | 1979–1991 |
| Lindsay | 1993–2009 |
| Casper | 2010–present |

Seat 10
Seat established on October 20, 1978 by 92 Stat. 1629
| Zobel | 1979–2014 |
| Burroughs | 2014–present |

Seat 11
Seat established on July 10, 1984 by 98 Stat. 333
| Wolf | 1985–2013 |
| Talwani | 2014–present |

Seat 12
Seat established on July 10, 1984 by 98 Stat. 333 (temporary)
Seat made permanent on December 1, 1990 by 104 Stat. 5089
| Young | 1985–2021 |
| Kobick | 2023–present |

Seat 13
Seat established on December 1, 1990 by 104 Stat. 5089
| Gorton | 1992–2025 |
| vacant | 2025–present |

Seat 14
Seat established on May 26, 1995 pursuant to 104 Stat. 5089 (temporary)
Seat became permanent upon the abolition of Seat 2 on March 1, 2001
| O'Toole, Jr. | 1995–2018 |
| Joun | 2023–present |

== List of U.S. attorneys ==
- Christopher Gore (1789–1796)
- Harrison Gray Otis (1796)
- John Davis (1796–1801)
- George Blake (1801–1829)
- Andrew Dunlop (1829–1835)
- John Mills (1835–1841)
- Franklin Dexter (1841–1845)
- Robert Rantoul Jr. (1846–1849)
- George Lunt (1850–1853)
- Benjamin F. Hallett (1853–1857)
- Charles L. Woodbury (1857–1861)
- Richard Henry Dana Jr. (1861–1866)
- George Stillman Hillard (1866–1870)
- David H. Mason (1870–1873)
- George P. Sanger (1873–1886)
- George M. Stearns (1886–1887)
- Owen A. Galvin (1887–1890)
- Frank D. Allen (1890–1893)
- Sherman Hoar (1893–1897)
- Boyd B. Jones (1897–1901)
- Henry P. Moulton (1901–1905)
- Melvin O. Adams (1905–1906)
- Asa P. French (1906–1914)
- George Weston Anderson (1914–1917)
- Thomas J. Boynton (1917–1920)
- Daniel J. Gallagher (1920–1921)
- Robert O. Harris (1921–1924)
- Harold P. Williams (1925–1926)
- Frederick H. Tarr (1926–1933)
- Francis J. W. Ford (1933–1938)
- John A. Canavan (1938–1939)
- Edmund J. Brandon (1939–1946)
- George F. Garrity (1946–1947)
- William T. McCarthy (1947–1949)
- George F. Garrity (1949–1953)
- Anthony Julian (1953–1959)
- Elliot Richardson (1959–1961)
- W. Arthur Garrity Jr. (1961–1966)
- Paul F. Markham (1966–1969)
- Herbert F. Travers Jr. (1969–1971)
- James N. Gabriel (1971–1972)
- Joseph L. Tauro (1972)
- James N. Gabriel (1973–1977)
- Edward F. Harrington (1977–1981)
- William F. Weld (1981–1986)
- Robert Mueller Acting (1986–1987)
- Frank L. McNamara Jr. (1987–1989)
- Jermiah T. O'Sullivan Acting (1989)
- Peter A. Mullin Acting (1989)
- Wayne Budd (1989–1992)
- A. John Pappalardo Acting (1992–1993)
- Donald K. Stern (1993–2001)
- Michael Sullivan (2001–2009)
- Michael Loucks Acting (2009)
- Carmen Ortiz (2009–2017)
- William D. Weinreb Acting (2017)
- Andrew Lelling (2017–2021)
- Nathaniel R. Mendell Acting (2021–2022)
- Rachael Rollins (2022–2023)
- Joshua S. Levy (2023–2025)
- Leah Foley (2025-)

== List of U.S. marshals ==
- Jonathan Jackson (1789–1791)
- John Brooks (1791–1796)
- Samuel Bradford (1796–1804)
- Thomson J. Skinner (1804–1807)
- James Prince (1807–1821)
- Samuel D. Harris (1821–1833)
- Jonas L. Sibley (1833–1841)
- Solomon Lincoln (1841–1844)
- Isaac O. Barnes (1844–1850)
- Charles Devens (1850–1853)
- Watson Freeman (1853–1861)
- John S. Keyes (1861–1867)
- George Leonard Andrews (1867–1871)
- Roland G. Usher (1871–1879)
- Nathaniel P. Banks (1879–1888)
- Henry B. Lovering (1888–1891)
- William W. Doherty (1891–1894)
- Henry W. Swift (1894–1899)
- Charles K. Darling (1899–1908)
- Guy Murchie Sr. (1908–1915)
- John Joseph Mitchell (1915–1920)
- Patrick J. Duane acting (1920–1921)
- William J. Keville (1921–1934)
- John J. Murphy (1934–1939)
- J. Henry Goguen (1939–1947)
- Arthur J. B. Cartier (1947–1953)
- Robert H. Beaudreau (1953–1956)
- Ralph W. Gray (1956–1961)
- Robert F. Morey (1961–1969)
- Albert A. Gammal Jr. (1969–1970)
- John A. Birknes (1970–1977)
- James I. Hartigan (1977–1981)
- Bernard Stone acting (1981–1983)
- James B. Roche III (1983–1990)
- Thomas Nixon acting (1990–1991)
- Robert T. Guiney (1991–1994)
- Nancy McGillivray (1994–2002)
- Anthony Dichio (2002–2005)
- John Gibbons (2010–2021)
- Brian A. Kyes (2023–present)

== Notable cases ==
- Ghen v. Rich (1881) (a whale is the property of the whaler who killed it, and not the person who found it dead on the beach).
- 2019 college admissions bribery scandal (2019)

== See also ==
- Courts of Massachusetts
- Judiciary of Massachusetts
- List of current United States district judges
- List of United States federal courthouses in Massachusetts
- United States Court of Appeals for the First Circuit
