= John A. Canavan =

American lawyer (1896–1963)

United States Attorney for the District of Massachusetts
- In office 1938–1939
- Preceded by: Francis Ford
- Succeeded by: Edmund J. Brandon

Personal details
- Born: August 3, 1896 Boston, Massachusetts
- Died: October 2, 1963 (aged 67) Winthrop, Massachusetts
- Occupation: Attorney

John Aloysius Canavan (August 3, 1896 – October 2, 1963) was an American attorney who served as the United States Attorney for the District of Massachusetts from 1938 to 1939.
