= Leah Foley =

US Attorney for Massachusetts

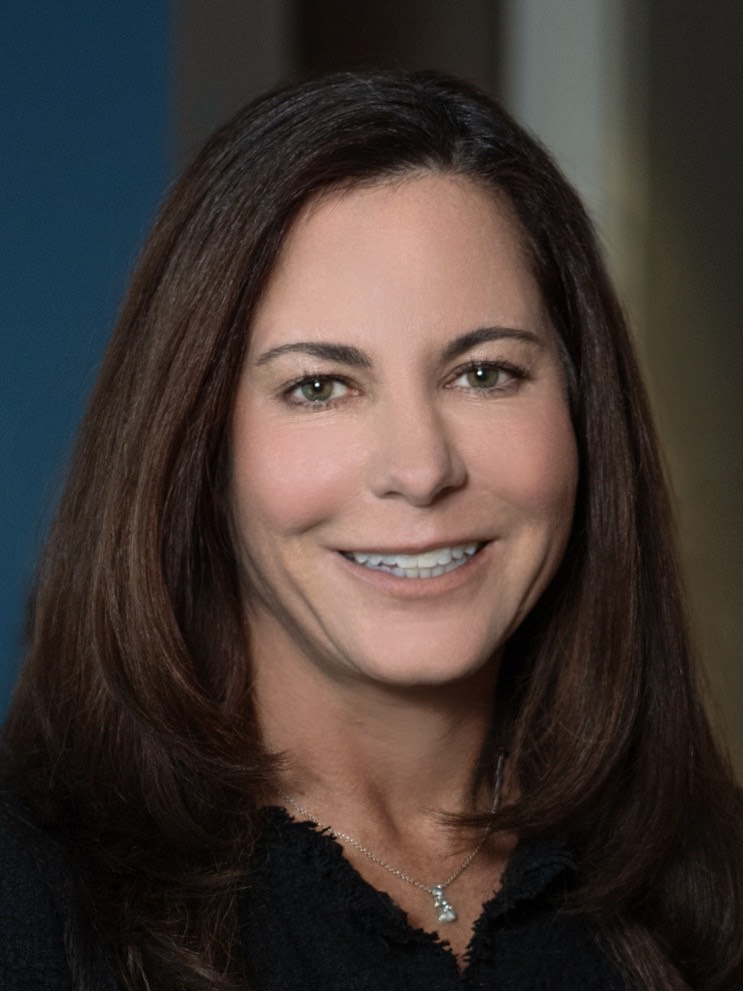
- Official portrait, 2025

United States Attorney for the District of Massachusetts
- Incumbent
- Assumed office January 20, 2025; Interim: January 20, 2025 – May 7, 2025
- President: Donald Trump
- Preceded by: Joshua S. Levy

Personal details
- Education: University of Louisiana at Lafayette (BA); Loyola Marymount University (JD); Georgetown University (LLM)

Leah Belaire Foley is an American lawyer who has served as the U.S. attorney for the District of Massachusetts since 2025.

On Jan. 20, 2025, Acting U.S. Attorney General James McHenry appointed Foley as interim U.S. Attorney. On May 7, 2025, the District Court appointed Foley as U.S. attorney pending the appointment of a Senate-confirmed nominee.

== Career ==
Foley began her career as an Assistant U.S. Attorney for Washington, D.C. Before being appointed she was the Deputy Chief of the Narcotics & Money Laundering Unit, and had since 2013 led the Organized Crime and Drug Enforcement Task Force.

She prosecuted violent crimes, sex crimes, and felony narcotics cases across the Washington, D.C. metropolitan area.

In addition, she served as counsel for the Senate Judiciary Committee from 1998 to 2002. She advised Senator Orrin Hatch on drug policy and worked internationally to combat drug trafficking.

Legal observers have said that under Trump, she is expected to make immigration and drug trafficking one of her top priorities, in line with the president's views. She was considered for the job under Trump's first administration, although that position ultimately went to Andrew Lelling. Lelling's immediate successor, acting U.S. attorney Nathaniel Mendell, indicated that the Trump administration has "a very clear idea about what they want to get accomplished in the time that they have." Former federal prosecutor Brian T. Kelly added that he expects her office to handle more immigration cases.

== Views ==
She has publicly criticized the idea that drug users can safely use pre-obtained illegal drugs under supervision at places known as "safe injection sites", stating they do not help addicts to overcome their addictions but rather that the sites "facilitate destructive behavior that ruins lives". She went further, also criticizing a major Boston tent encampment struggling with substance abuse disorders and homelessness, calling it "Methadone Mile". She said that "[c]reating environments that assist people with pumping poisons into their bodies is neither compassionate nor constructive. We should continue to direct all our resources to the prevention efforts that steer people, especially our youth, away from drug use and treatment protocols that truly save peoples' lives from their addictions." There is no state law in Massachusetts blocking creation of such sites.
