= Joshua S. Levy =

American lawyer

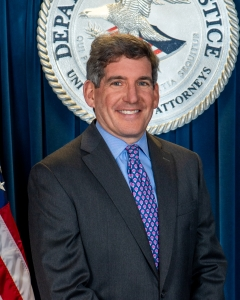

United States Attorney for the District of Massachusetts
- In office May 19, 2023 – January 17, 2025; Acting: May 19, 2023 – November 25, 2024
- President: Joe Biden
- Preceded by: Rachael Rollins
- Succeeded by: Leah Foley

Personal details
- Education: Brown University (BA); Georgetown University (JD)

Joshua S. Levy is an American attorney who previously served as the United States Attorney for the District of Massachusetts from November 25, 2024 to January 17, 2025.

Levy was sworn-in as First Assistant U.S. Attorney for Massachusetts by U.S. District Court Chief Judge F. Dennis Saylor IV on January 11, 2022, after having been appointed to serve by then newly-confirmed U.S. Attorney for Massachusetts, Rachael S. Rollins. On May 19, 2023, Rollins abruptly resigned; in accordance with the Vacancies Act, Levy immediately assumed the role of Acting U.S. Attorney. Levy was twice nominated by President Biden for the permanent role of U.S. Attorney for Massachusetts, but neither nomination passed confirmation by the Senate; Levy was eventually officially appointed by Attorney General Garland in the final week of November 2024, but he ultimately resigned shortly after, on January 17, 2025.

As of March 31, 2025, Levy has returned to Ropes & Gray LLP as a partner in its litigation and enforcement practice group.

== Education ==
Levy is an alumnus of Belmont Hill School. He received a Bachelor of Arts from Brown University in 1987 and a Juris Doctor from Georgetown University Law Center in 1992.

== Career ==
Levy served as a law clerk for Judge Harold H. Greene of the United States District Court for the District of Columbia. From 1997 to 2004, he was an assistant United States attorney in the U.S. Attorney's Office for the District of Massachusetts. From 1993 to 1997, he was an associate at the law firm Ropes & Gray and from 2004 to 2021, he was a partner at the same firm.

In January 2022, Levy returned to the U.S. Attorney's Office for Massachusetts, having been appointed by U.S. Attorney Rachael S. Rollins to serve as her First Assistant U.S. Attorney. On May 19, 2023, he began serving as Acting United States Attorney for the District of Massachusetts. He assumed the role of Acting United States Attorney after two separate ethics reports published by the Justice Department Office of Inspector General and U.S. Office of Special Counsel detailed Hatch Act violations and abuse of office by his predecessor, former U.S. Attorney Rachael Rollins, who promptly resigned.

=== Nomination as U.S. attorney ===
On October 18, 2023, President Joe Biden announced his intent to nominate Levy to be the United States attorney for the District of Massachusetts.

On October 24, 2023, his nomination was sent to the Senate. On January 3, 2024, his nomination was returned to the president under Rule XXXI, Paragraph 6 of the United States Senate. He was renominated on January 11. On March 7, 2024, his nomination was favorably reported out of committee by a 11–10 vote.

His nomination remained pending before the United States Senate for months until U.S. Attorney General Merrick Garland eventually appointed Levy to the official, non-acting position in late November 2024, with only two months of the Biden presidential administration remaining before the inauguration of President-elect Donald Trump on January 20, 2025.

On January 6, 2025, U.S. Attorney Levy tendered his resignation to Attorney General Garland. The resignation, effective January 17, 2025, was accepted. Levy resumed his position as partner at Ropes & Gray LLP in March 2025.

Legal offices
Preceded by Rachael Rollins	United States Attorney for the District of Massachusetts; 2023–present	Incumbent
