= James N. Gabriel =

American judge (1923–1991)

Bankruptcy Judge for the United States District Court for the District of Massachusetts
- In office December 1977 – 1990

United States Attorney for the District of Massachusetts
- In office 1973 – August 1, 1977
- President: Richard Nixon; Gerald Ford; Jimmy Carter
- Preceded by: Joseph L. Tauro
- Succeeded by: Edward F. Harrington
- In office 1971–1972
- President: Richard Nixon
- Preceded by: Herbert F. Travers, Jr.
- Succeeded by: Joseph L. Tauro

Personal details
- Born: James Nicholas Gabriel; February 26, 1923 Brooklyn, New York
- Died: November 26, 1991 (aged 68) Brighton, Massachusetts
- Party: Republican
- Spouse: Helen Rawan
- Children: 5
- Education: Boston College (LLB); New York University (LLM)

Military service
- Branch/service: United States Army Air Forces
- Years of service: 1943–1945
- Battles/wars: World War II

James Nicholas Gabriel (February 26, 1923 – November 26, 1991) was an American lawyer and judge from Massachusetts.

== Early life and education ==
He was born in Brooklyn, New York and graduated from Cambridge Rindge and Latin School. He attended Boston College for two years before enlisting in the military. He graduated from Boston College Law School with a Bachelor of Laws in 1949. He later earned a Master of Laws from New York University School of Law.

== Military service ==
He enlisted and served in the United States Army Air Forces during World War II.

== Legal career ==
He was in private practice before working for the state government of Massachusetts.

He served as an assistant attorney general for public works under Massachusetts Attorneys General Edward Brooke, Ed Martin, and Elliot Richardson.

He served as the United States Attorney for the District of Massachusetts from 1971 to 1972 and again from 1973 to 1977. From 1977 to 1990 he was a United States bankruptcy court judge for the District of Massachusetts. During his last four years on the bench he was the court's chief judge.

== Political career ==
He is a former member of the Massachusetts Republican Committee. He is a former chairman of the Cambridge Republican City Committee and the Young Republican Club of Cambridge.

== Personal life and death ==
He married Helen Rawan and the couple had five children. He died on November 26, 1991, in Lexington, Massachusetts.
