= Hugh Dean McLellan =

American judge

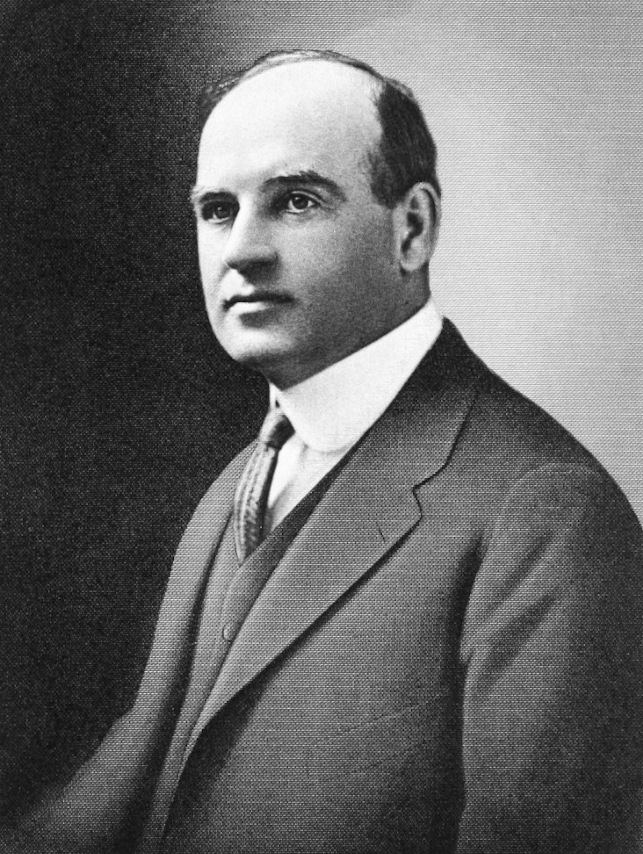

Judge of the United States District Court for the District of Massachusetts
- In office February 10, 1932 – September 30, 1941
- Appointed by: Herbert Hoover
- Preceded by: James Madison Morton Jr.
- Succeeded by: Charles Edward Wyzanski Jr.

Personal details
- Born: September 10, 1876 Belfast, Maine, U.S.
- Died: June 20, 1953 (aged 76) Brookline, Massachusetts, U.S.
- Spouse: Nina McLellan
- Children: 2
- Education: Colby College (A.B.); Columbia Law School (LL.B.)

Hugh Dean McLellan (September 10, 1876 – June 20, 1953) was a United States district judge of the United States District Court for the District of Massachusetts.

== Education and career ==
Born in Belfast, Maine, McLellan graduated from high school at age 14. He received an Artium Baccalaureus degree from Colby College in 1895 at age 18, playing football and baseball while teaching during the winter. He joined his father law practice before obtaining a Bachelor of Laws from Columbia Law School in 1902 while playing on the football team and serving as a teacher in evening school. He was in private practice in Boston, Massachusetts from 1902 to 1932. He was a lecturer for Boston University Law School from 1929 to 1938. He was a lecturer for Harvard Law School from 1935 to 1942.

== Federal judicial service ==
McLellan was nominated by President Herbert Hoover on January 18, 1932, to a seat on the United States District Court for the District of Massachusetts vacated by Judge James Madison Morton Jr. He was confirmed by the United States Senate on February 3, 1932, and received his commission on February 10, 1932. McLellan resigned on September 30, 1941.

== Later career and death ==
After his resignation from the federal bench, McLellan resumed private practice in Boston from 1941 to 1953. He died in Brookline, Massachusetts, on June 20, 1953.

== Sources ==
Legal offices
Preceded by James Madison Morton Jr.	Judge of the United States District Court for the District of Massachusetts; 1932–1941	Succeeded by Charles Edward Wyzanski Jr.
