= Mark G. Mastroianni =

American judge (born 1964)

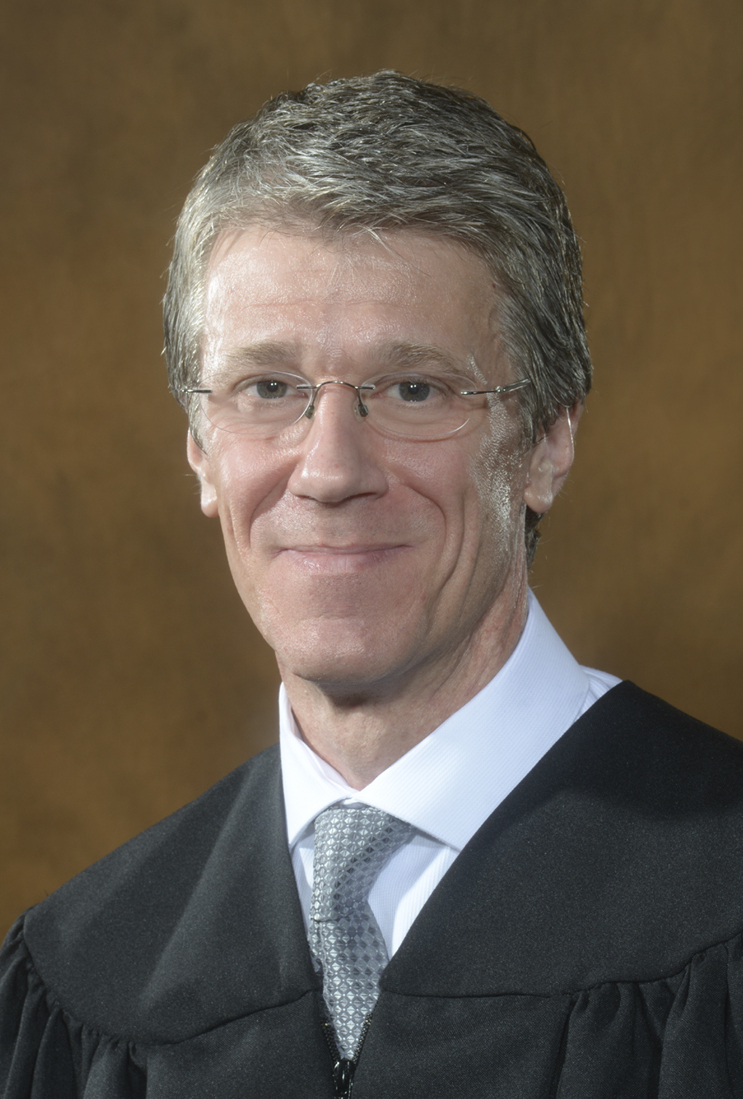
- Mastroianni in 2015

Judge of the United States District Court for the District of Massachusetts
- Incumbent
- Assumed office June 5, 2014
- Appointed by: Barack Obama
- Preceded by: Michael Ponsor

District Attorney of Hampden County
- In office January 5, 2011 – June 5, 2014
- Preceded by: William Bennett
- Succeeded by: James Orenstein

Personal details
- Born: 1964 (age 61–62) Springfield, Massachusetts, U.S.
- Education: American International College (BA); Western New England University (JD)

Mark Gerald Mastroianni (born 1964) is a United States district judge of the United States District Court for the District of Massachusetts. He has served on the court since 2014. Prior to joining the federal bench, he was district attorney of Hampden County, Massachusetts.

== Early life and education ==
Mastroianni graduated from Cathedral High School in Springfield, Massachusetts. He received a Bachelor of Arts degree, magna cum laude, in 1986, from the American International College. He received a Juris Doctor in 1989 from Western New England School of Law.

== Career ==
Mastroianni began his career in the Hampden District Attorney's Office as an assistant district attorney in 1990. From 1995 to 2011, he worked as an attorney in private practice as a sole practitioner, focusing his practice on criminal defense matters in state and federal court. He then became district attorney for Hampden County, Massachusetts, serving as the chief law enforcement officer of the county and managing an office of nearly 140 employees. Under Mastroianni, the D.A.'s Office opened an unsolved-crime unit and a DNA unit, allowing several cold cases to be solved.

=== Federal judicial service ===
When a vacancy on the U.S. District Court for the District of Massachusetts opened, Mastroianni interviewed for the position before a committee to screen and recommend possible candidates, convened by Senator Elizabeth Warren and led by former District Judge Nancy Gertner. Mastroianni submitted his application in early 2013, went through several rounds of interviews, and received the recommendation. On September 24, 2013, President Barack Obama nominated Mastroianni to serve on the court, to the seat vacated by Judge Michael Ponsor, who assumed senior status on August 15, 2011. Mastroianni was rated "well qualified" for the post by a substantial majority of the American Bar Association's Standing Committee on the Federal Judiciary. He received a hearing before the Senate Judiciary Committee on February 11, 2014. His nomination was reported out of committee by voice vote on March 6, 2014. On May 22, 2014 Senate Majority Leader Harry Reid filed for cloture on the nomination. On June 3, 2014, the Senate invoked cloture on his nomination by a 56–39 vote. On June 4, 2014, Mastroianni was confirmed by a 92–2 vote. He received his judicial commission the following day, and was ceremonially sworn in on August 1, 2014.

=== Notable cases ===
Mastroianni presided over a trademark case involving the name "fire cider" (a mixture of herbs, apple cider vinegar, and other ingredients). After a Pittsfield, Massachusetts-based company registered the phrase as a trademark in 2012, others brought suit, contending that the phrase is a longstanding phrase in herbalism that cannot be trademarked. In 2019, Mastroianni issued a decision siding with the challengers and holding that "fire cider" is a generic term.

In 2017, Mastroianni dismissed a defamation lawsuit brought by Katherine Mae McKee against comedian Bill Cosby. After McKee accused Cosby of raping her in 1974, a Cosby representative published a public letter in 2014 questioning her credibility, prompting the woman to sue for defamation. In dismissing McKee's suit, Mastroianni held that the Free Speech Clause of the First Amendment to the United States Constitution gave broad liberty to for individuals publicly accused of misconduct to defend themselves without fear of being held liable for defamation.

== Personal life ==
Mastroianni is married and has three daughters.

Legal offices
Preceded by Michael Ponsor	Judge of the United States District Court for the District of Massachusetts; 2014–present	Incumbent
