= George W. Anderson (judge) =

American judge (1861–1938)

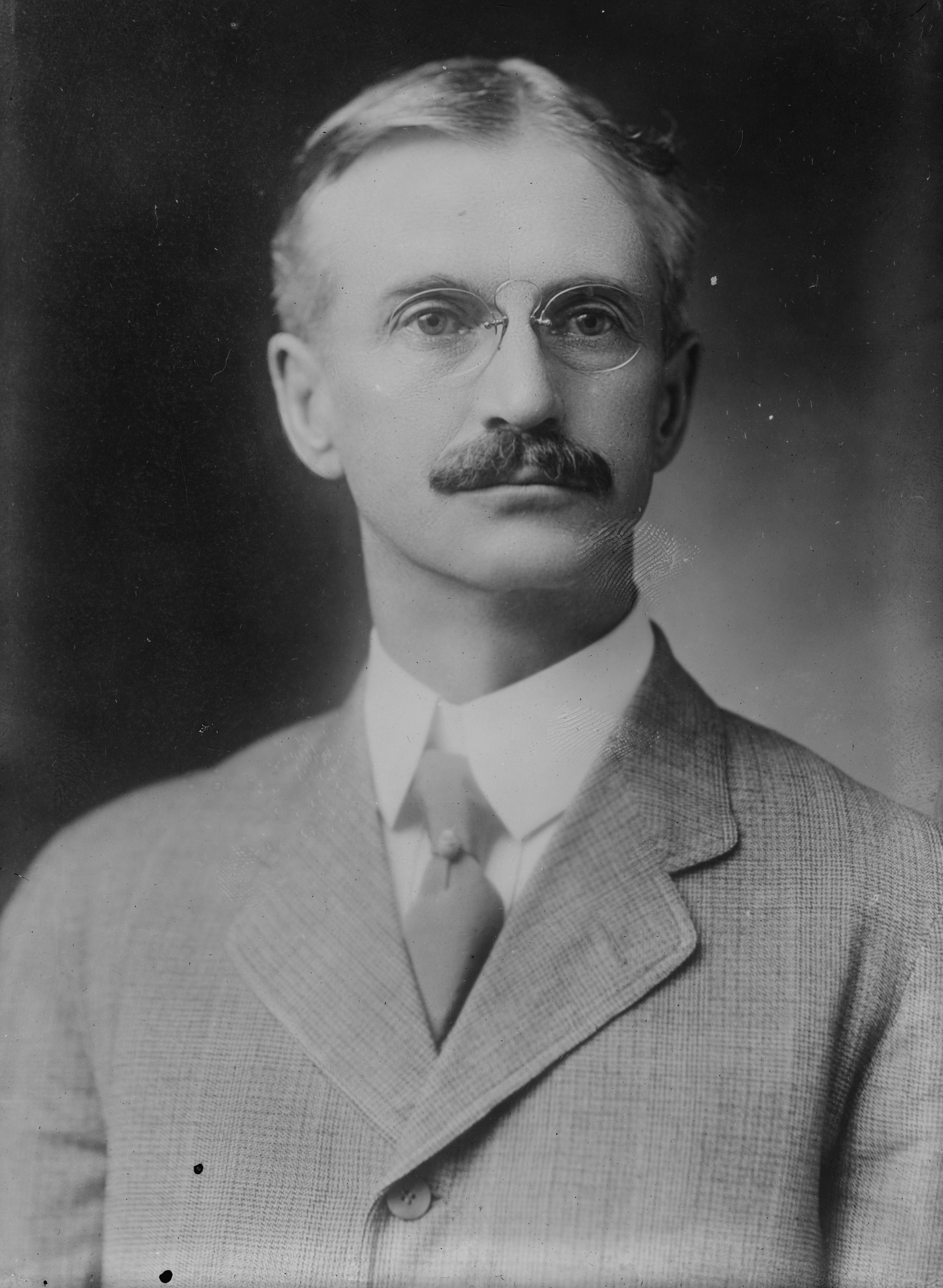

Senior Judge of the United States Court of Appeals for the First Circuit
- In office September 30, 1931 – February 14, 1938

Judge of the United States Court of Appeals for the First Circuit
- In office October 24, 1918 – September 30, 1931
- Appointed by: Woodrow Wilson
- Preceded by: Frederic Dodge
- Succeeded by: James Madison Morton Jr.

United States Attorney for the District of Massachusetts
- In office 1914–1917
- Appointed by: Woodrow Wilson
- Preceded by: Asa P. French
- Succeeded by: Thomas J. Boynton

Personal details
- Born: George Weston Anderson; September 1, 1861 Acworth, New Hampshire, U.S.
- Died: February 14, 1938 (aged 76) DeLand, Florida, U.S.
- Education: Williams College (AB); Boston University School of Law (LLB)

George Weston Anderson (September 1, 1861 – February 14, 1938) was a United States circuit judge of the United States Court of Appeals for the First Circuit.

== Education and career ==
Born on September 1, 1861, on a farm in Acworth, New Hampshire, Anderson received an Artium Baccalaureus degree, cum laude, in 1886 from Williams College and a Bachelor of Laws, magna cum laude, in 1890 from Boston University School of Law. He entered private practice in Boston, Massachusetts from 1890 to 1914. He was an instructor at Boston University School of Law from 1891 to 1894. He was the United States Attorney for the District of Massachusetts from 1914 to 1917. He was a member of the Interstate Commerce Commission from 1917 to 1918.

=== Role in Brandeis confirmation ===
In 1916, he worked to win Senate approval of Louis Brandeis when he was nominated to the United States Supreme Court, serving as counsel to the subcommittee that considered the nomination and conducting some of the crucial cross examination of witnesses.

=== Constitutional convention delegate ===
In 1916, the Massachusetts General Court and electorate approved a calling of a Constitutional Convention. Anderson was elected as a Delegate at Large to serve as a member of the Massachusetts Constitutional Convention of 1917.

== Federal judicial service ==
Anderson was nominated by President Woodrow Wilson on October 1, 1918, to a seat on the United States Court of Appeals for the First Circuit vacated by Judge Frederic Dodge. He was confirmed by the United States Senate on October 24, 1918, and received his commission the same day. He assumed senior status on September 30, 1931. His service terminated on February 14, 1938, due to his death.

=== Notable case ===
Anderson was noted for dissenting when the court upheld some of the convictions arising from the Red Scare of 1919 to 1920. In June 1920, he effectively prevented any further resumption of the Palmer raids of November 1919 and January 1920 when his decision in the case of Colyer v. Skeffington ordered the discharge of 17 arrested radicals. His opinion concluded that there was no evidence that the Communist Party of the United States had urged a violent overthrow of the United States Government and he strongly criticized the United States Department of Justice for using entrapment and for its failure to follow proper legal procedures. Of the deportation proceedings he wrote: "A more lawless proceeding it is hard for anyone to conceive.... I can hardly sit on the bench as an American citizen and restrain my indignation. I view with horror such proceedings as this." The Colyer case remained controversial. For example, during Senate hearings held to consider charges that Attorney General A. Mitchell Palmer had ignored due process in arresting radicals in late 1919 and early 1920, a former Department of Justice official testified that Anderson had shown favoritism to witnesses on behalf of the defendant aliens in the Colyer deportation case.

== Family ==
Anderson was married for eight years to Winnie E. Mitchell of Mason, New Hampshire, until her death. They had two sons and a daughter. In 1897 he married Addie Earle Kenerson of Boston, who survived him. The same year, he was elected a Fellow of the American Academy of Arts and Sciences. He lived in the Wellesley Hills neighborhood of Wellesley, Massachusetts.

== Retirement and death ==
Anderson took inactive senior status in 1932, meaning that while he remained a federal judge, he no longer heard cases or participated in the business of the court. He died at his winter home in DeLand, Florida, on February 14, 1938.

== Sources ==
Party political offices
Preceded by	Democratic nominee for Attorney General of Massachusetts; 1912	Succeeded by Thomas J. Boynton
Legal offices
Preceded by Frederic Dodge	Judge of the United States Court of Appeals for the First Circuit; 1918–1931	Succeeded by James Madison Morton Jr.
