= Edmund J. Brandon =

American lawyer (1894–1946)

United States Attorney for the District of Massachusetts
- In office 1939–1946
- Preceded by: John A. Canavan
- Succeeded by: George F. Garrity

U.S. Securities and Exchange Commission Regional Administrator for the Boston Regional Office, Zone 1
- In office 1935–1936
- Preceded by: Position created
- Succeeded by: James J. Caffrey

Personal details
- Born: May 24, 1894 Cambridge, Massachusetts
- Died: November 1, 1946 (aged 52) near Chestnut Hill, Massachusetts
- Party: Democrat
- Spouse: Anna Coleman McCarthy
- Occupation: Attorney

Edmund John Brandon (May 24, 1894 – November 1, 1946) was an American attorney and government official who served as the Administrator of the U.S. Securities and Exchange Commission's Boston Regional Office, Zone 1 in 1935. He eventually resigned as commissioner because he had too much work to do as receiver of the Atlantic National Bank.

He also served as the United States Attorney for the District of Massachusetts from February 9, 1939 to 1946. In his first year he had a record of 417 wins and one loss.

== Early life ==
He was born in Cambridge, Massachusetts and attended their public schools. He went on to attend Boston College where he played football, and was later graduated from Boston University in 1919. He passed the bar exam in 1918.

== Personal life ==
Brandon served as the Massachusetts State Deputy of the Knights of Columbus from 1924 to 1927. He was a friend of James Roosevelt.

During World War I, he was a Lt. Commander in the Engineering Training Department of the First Naval District. Pope Pius XII made him a knight of the Sovereign Military Order of Malta.

== Works cited ==
- Lapomarda, Vincent A. (1992). The Knights of Columbus in Massachusetts (second ed.). Norwood, Massachusetts: Knights of Columbus Massachusetts State Council.
