= United States Court of Appeals for the First Circuit =

Current United States federal appellate court

- (1st Cir.)

- Location: John Joseph Moakley U.S. Courthouse (Boston, Massachusetts)
- Appeals from: District of Maine; District of Massachusetts; District of New Hampshire; District of Puerto Rico; District of Rhode Island
- Established: June 16, 1891
- Judges: 6
- Circuit Justice: Ketanji Brown Jackson
- Chief Judge: David J. Barron
- www.ca1.uscourts.gov

The United States Court of Appeals for the First Circuit (in case citations, 1st Cir.) is a federal court with appellate jurisdiction over the district courts in the following districts:

- District of Maine
- District of Massachusetts
- District of New Hampshire
- District of Puerto Rico
- District of Rhode Island

The court is based at the John Joseph Moakley Federal Courthouse in Boston, Massachusetts. Most sittings are held in Boston, where the court usually sits for one week most months of the year; in one of July or August, it takes a summer break and does not sit. The First Circuit also sits for one week each March and November at the Jose V. Toledo Federal Building and United States Courthouse in Old San Juan, Puerto Rico, and occasionally sits at other locations within the circuit.

With six active judges and five active senior judges, the First Circuit has the fewest judges of any of the thirteen United States courts of appeals. It covers most of New England, as well as Puerto Rico. Following his retirement from the Supreme Court in 2009, Associate Justice David Souter occasionally sat on the First Circuit by designation. Former justice Stephen Breyer began to do so in 2025.

== Current composition of the court ==
As of November 7, 2025:

#	Title	Judge	Duty station	Born	Term of service			Appointed by
#	Title	Judge	Duty station	Born	Active	Chief	Senior	Appointed by
32	Chief Judge	David J. Barron	Boston, MA	1967	2014–present	2022–present	—	Obama
33	Circuit Judge	Gustavo Gelpí	San Juan, PR	1965	2021–present	—	—	Biden
34	Circuit Judge	Lara Montecalvo	Providence, RI	1974	2022–present	—	—	Biden
35	Circuit Judge	Julie Rikelman	Boston, MA	1972	2023–present	—	—	Biden
36	Circuit Judge	Seth Aframe	Concord, NH	1974	2024–present	—	—	Biden
37	Circuit Judge	Joshua Dunlap	Portland, ME	1983	2025–present	—	—	Trump
18	Senior Judge	Levin H. Campbell	inactive	1927	1972–1992	1983–1990	1992–present	Nixon
27	Senior Judge	Sandra Lynch	Boston, MA	1946	1995–2022	2008–2015	2022–present	Clinton
28	Senior Judge	Kermit Lipez	Portland, ME	1941	1998–2011	—	2011–present	Clinton
29	Senior Judge	Jeffrey R. Howard	Concord, NH	1955	2002–2022	2015–2022	2022–present	G.W. Bush
30	Senior Judge	O. Rogeriee Thompson	Providence, RI	1951	2010–2022	—	2022–present	Obama
31	Senior Judge	William J. Kayatta Jr.	Portland, ME	1953	2013–2024	—	2024–present	Obama

== List of former judges ==
#	Judge	State	Born–died	Active service	Chief Judge	Senior status	Appointed by	Reason for termination
1	LeBaron B. Colt	RI	1846–1924	1891–1913 (Note: Colt was appointed as a circuit judge for the First Circuit in 1884 by Chester A. Arthur. The Judiciary Act of 1891 reassigned his seat to what is now the U.S. Court of Appeals for the First Circuit.)	—	—	Arthur / Operation of law	resignation
2	William LeBaron Putnam	ME	1835–1918	1892–1917	—	—	B. Harrison	retirement
3	Francis Cabot Lowell	MA	1855–1911	1905–1911	—	—	T. Roosevelt	death
4	William Schofield	MA	1857–1912	1911–1912	—	—	Taft	death
5	Frederic Dodge	MA	1847–1927	1912–1918	—	—	Taft	resignation
6	George Hutchins Bingham	NH	1864–1949	1913–1939	—	1939–1949	Wilson	death
7	Charles Fletcher Johnson	ME	1859–1930	1917–1929	—	1929–1930	Wilson	death
8	George W. Anderson	MA	1861–1938	1918–1931	—	1931–1938	Wilson	death
9	Scott Wilson	ME	1870–1942	1929–1940	—	1940–1942	Hoover	death
10	James Madison Morton Jr.	MA	1869–1940	1932–1939	—	1939–1940	Hoover	death
11	Calvert Magruder	MA	1893–1968	1939–1959	1948–1959	1959–1968	F. Roosevelt	death
12	John Christopher Mahoney	RI	1882–1952	1940–1950	—	1950–1952	F. Roosevelt	death
13	Peter Woodbury	NH	1899–1970	1941–1964	1959–1964	1964–1970	F. Roosevelt	death
14	John Patrick Hartigan	RI	1887–1968	1950–1965	—	1965–1968	Truman	death
15	Bailey Aldrich	MA	1907–2002	1959–1972	1965–1972	1972–2002	Eisenhower	death
16	Edward McEntee	RI	1906–1981	1965–1976	—	1976–1981	L. Johnson	death
17	Frank M. Coffin	ME	1919–2009	1965–1989	1972–1983	1989–2009	L. Johnson	death
19	Hugh H. Bownes	NH	1920–2003	1977–1990	—	1990–2003	Carter	death
20	Stephen Breyer	MA	1938–present	1980–1994	1990–1994	—	Carter	elevation
21	Juan R. Torruella	PR	1933–2020	1984–2020	1994–2001	—	Reagan	death
22	Bruce M. Selya	RI	1934–2025	1986–2006	—	2006–2025	Reagan	death
23	Conrad K. Cyr	ME	1931–2016	1989–1997	—	1997–2016	G.H.W. Bush	death
24	David Souter	NH	1939–2025	1990	—	—	G.H.W. Bush	elevation
25	Michael Boudin	MA	1939–2025	1992–2013	2001–2008	2013–2021	G.H.W. Bush	retirement
26	Norman H. Stahl	NH	1931–2023	1992–2001	—	2001–2023	G.H.W. Bush	death

== Chief judges ==
Chief Judge
Magruder	1948–1959
Woodbury	1959–1964
Aldrich	1965–1972
Coffin	1972–1983
Campbell	1983–1990
Breyer	1990–1994
Torruella	1994–2001
Boudin	2001–2008
Lynch	2008–2015
Howard	2015–2022
Barron	2022–present

Chief judges have administrative responsibilities with respect to their circuits, and preside over any panel on which they serve, unless the circuit justice (the Supreme Court justice responsible for the circuit) is also on the panel. Unlike the Supreme Court, where one justice is specifically nominated to be chief, the office of chief judge rotates among the circuit judges.

To be chief, a judge must have been in active service on the court for at least one year, be under the age of 65, and have not previously served as chief judge. A vacancy is filled by the judge highest in seniority among the group of qualified judges, with seniority determined first by commission date, then by age. The chief judge serves for a term of seven years, or until age 70, whichever occurs first. If no judge qualifies to be chief, the youngest judge over the age of 65 who has served on the court for at least one year shall act as chief until another judge qualifies. If no judge has served on the court for more than a year, the most senior judge shall act as chief. Judges can forfeit or resign their chief judgeship or acting chief judgeship while retaining their active status as a circuit judge.

When the office was created in 1948, the chief judge was the longest-serving judge who had not elected to retire, on what has since 1958 been known as senior status, or declined to serve as chief judge. After August 6, 1959, judges could not become or remain chief after turning 70 years old. The current rules have been in operation since October 1, 1982.

== Succession of seats ==
The court has six seats for active judges, numbered in the order in which they were initially filled. Judges who assume senior status enter a kind of retirement in which they remain on the bench but vacate their seats, thus allowing the U.S. President to appoint new judges to fill their seats.

Seat 1
Established on December 10, 1869 by the Judiciary Act of 1869 as a circuit judgeship for the First Circuit
Reassigned on June 16, 1891 to the United States Circuit Court of Appeals for the First Circuit by the Judiciary Act of 1891
Colt	RI	1891–1913
Bingham	NH	1913–1939
Magruder	MA	1939–1959
Aldrich	MA	1959–1972
Campbell	MA	1972–1992
Boudin	MA	1992–2013
Barron	MA	2014–present

Seat 2
Established on June 16, 1891 by the Judiciary Act of 1891
Putnam	ME	1892–1917
Johnson	ME	1917–1929
Wilson	ME	1929–1940
Woodbury	NH	1941–1964
McEntee	RI	1965–1976
Bownes	NH	1977–1990
Souter	NH	1990
Stahl	NH	1992–2001
Howard	NH	2002–2022
Aframe	NH	2024–present

Seat 3
Established on January 21, 1905 by 33 Stat. 611
Lowell	MA	1905–1911
Schofield	MA	1911–1912
Dodge	MA	1912–1918
Anderson	MA	1918–1931
Morton Jr.	MA	1932–1939
Mahoney	RI	1940–1950
Hartigan	RI	1950–1965
Coffin	ME	1965–1989
Cyr	ME	1989–1997
Lipez	ME	1998–2011
Kayatta Jr.	ME	2013–2024
Dunlap	ME	2025–present

Seat 4
Established on October 20, 1978 by 92 Stat. 1629
Breyer	MA	1980–1994
Lynch	MA	1995–2022
Rikelman	MA	2023–present

Seat 5
Established on July 10, 1984 by 98 Stat. 333
Torruella	PR	1984–2020
Gelpí	PR	2021–present

Seat 6
Established on July 10, 1984 by 98 Stat. 333
Selya	RI	1986–2006
Thompson	RI	2010–2022
Montecalvo	RI	2022–present

== Notable decisions ==
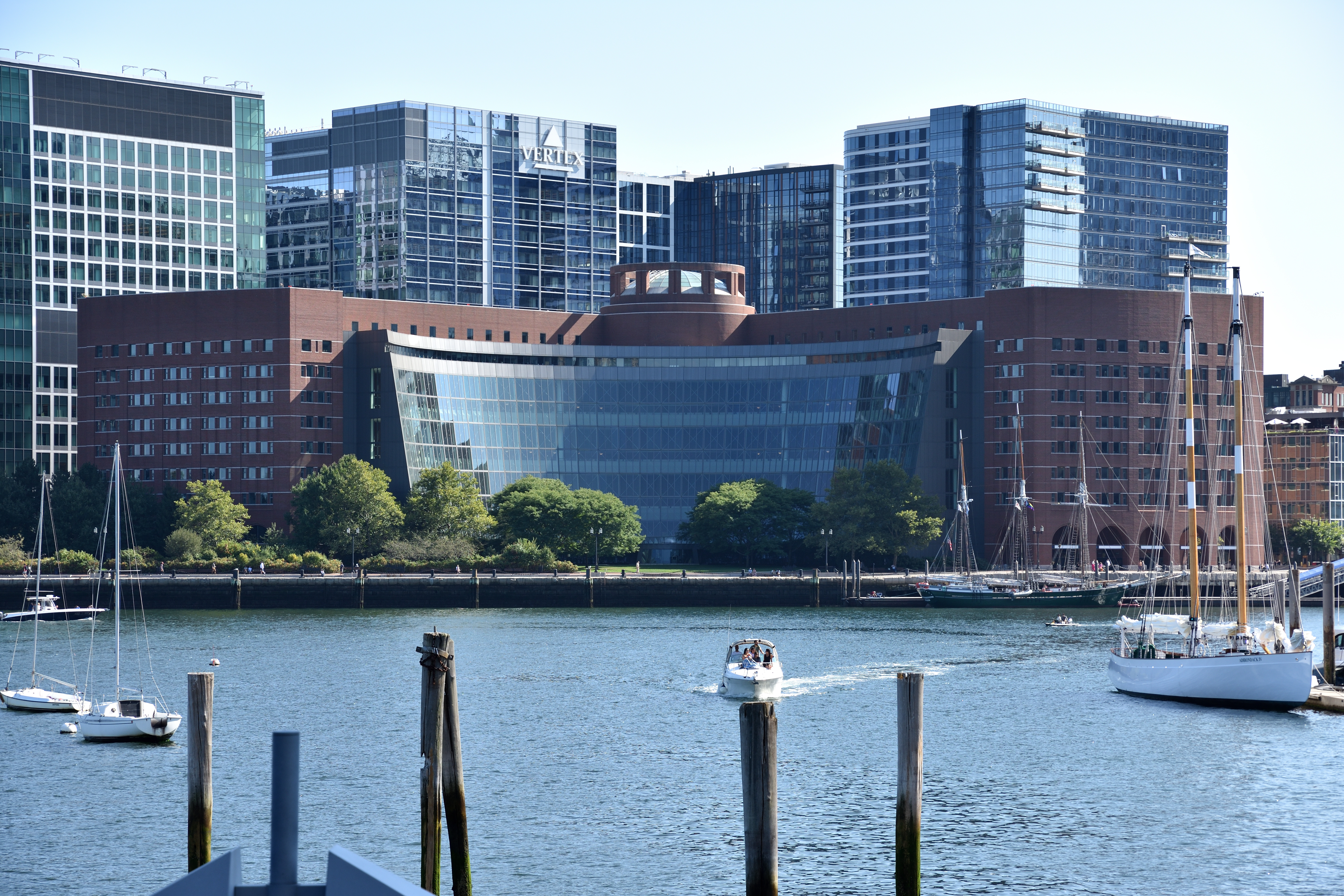
The court's headquarters, the John Joseph Moakley United States Courthouse in Boston

- West v. Randall (1820), one of the first decisions setting precedent for class action suits
- In September 2026, a three-judge panel of the First Circuit largely upheld a lower court's decision that the Department of Homeland Security's third-country removal policy was unlawful. Writing for the panel, Circuit Judge Seth R. Aframe held that migrants facing deportation to a third country must be informed of their destination and given a "meaningful opportunity" to challenge it on grounds of feared persecution or torture. US Solicitor General D. John Saurer petitioned the US Supreme Court asking for the Court to block the District Court's ruling, arguing the case "rests on the same fundamentally flalwed legal premises as the previous rulings." On September 29, 2026, the US Supreme Court paused the First Circuit, allowing for third-country removals to continue, until they can rule on the merits of the dispute. Oral arguments are expected in December 2026, with a ruling some time in 2027.

== See also ==
- Courts of the United States
- Judicial appointment history for United States federal courts#First Circuit
- List of current United States circuit judges
- List of United States federal courthouses in the First Circuit
