= William T. McCarthy =

American judge (1885–1964)

Senior Judge of the United States District Court for the District of Massachusetts
- In office May 31, 1960 – April 6, 1964

Judge of the United States District Court for the District of Massachusetts
- In office February 2, 1949 – May 31, 1960
- Appointed by: Harry S. Truman
- Preceded by: Arthur Daniel Healey
- Succeeded by: Andrew A. Caffrey

United States Attorney for the District of Massachusetts
- In office 1947–1949
- Appointed by: Harry S. Truman
- Preceded by: George F. Garrity
- Succeeded by: George F. Garrity

Personal details
- Born: December 5, 1885 Somerville, Massachusetts, U.S.
- Died: April 6, 1964 (aged 78)
- Education: College of the Holy Cross (BA); Boston University (JD)

William T. McCarthy (December 5, 1885 – April 6, 1964) was a United States district judge of the United States District Court for the District of Massachusetts.

== Early life and career ==
Born in Somerville, Massachusetts, McCarthy received an Artium Baccalaureus degree from College of the Holy Cross in 1905 and a Juris Doctor from Boston University School of Law in 1908. He entered private practice in Boston, Massachusetts, in 1908. He was an Alderman for the Town of Somerville from 1911 to 1913. He was an assistant district attorney of Middlesex County, Massachusetts, from 1913 to 1915. He was a member of the Somerville School Board from 1920 to 1921. He was an Assistant United States Attorney for the District of Massachusetts from 1934 to 1947. He was the United States Attorney for the District of Massachusetts from 1947 to 1949.

== Federal judicial service ==
McCarthy was nominated by President Harry S. Truman on January 13, 1949, to a seat on the United States District Court for the District of Massachusetts vacated by Judge Arthur Daniel Healey. He was confirmed by the United States Senate on January 31, 1949, and received his commission on February 2, 1949. He assumed senior status on May 31, 1960. McCarthy served in that capacity until his death on April 6, 1964.

== Sources ==
Legal offices
Preceded by Arthur Daniel Healey	Judge of the United States District Court for the District of Massachusetts; 1949–1960	Succeeded by Andrew A. Caffrey
