= William Schofield =

American judge (1857–1912)

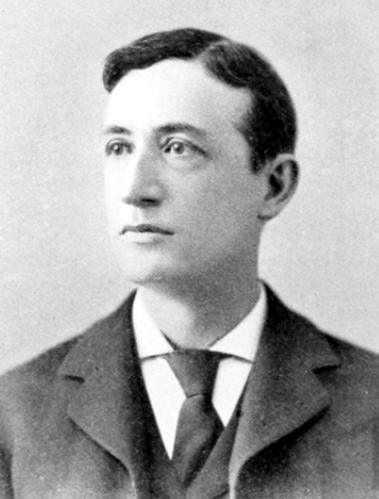
- c. 1896

Judge of the United States Court of Appeals for the First Circuit
- In office June 6, 1911 – June 10, 1912
- Appointed by: William Howard Taft
- Preceded by: Francis Cabot Lowell
- Succeeded by: Frederic Dodge

Judge of the United States Circuit Courts for the First Circuit
- In office June 6, 1911 – December 31, 1911
- Appointed by: William Howard Taft
- Preceded by: Francis Cabot Lowell
- Succeeded by: Seat abolished

Personal details
- Born: February 14, 1857 Dudley, Massachusetts, U.S.
- Died: June 10, 1912 (aged 55) Malden, Massachusetts, U.S.
- Spouse: Ednah M. Green (m. 1892)
- Education: Harvard Law School (LLB)

William Schofield (February 14, 1857 – June 10, 1912) was a United States circuit judge of the United States Court of Appeals for the First Circuit and the United States Circuit Courts for the First Circuit.

== Education and career ==
William Schofield was born in Dudley, Massachusetts on February 14, 1857. He received a Bachelor of Laws from Harvard Law School in 1883, and served as a law clerk to United States Supreme Court Justice Horace Gray from 1883 to 1885.

He married Ednah M. Green on December 1, 1892.

He was in private practice of law in Boston, Massachusetts from 1885 to 1903, serving as an instructor at Harvard University from 1886 to 1892, and as a member of the Massachusetts House of Representatives from 1899 to 1902. He was an associate judge of the Massachusetts Superior Court from 1903 to 1911.

== Federal judicial service ==
Schofield was nominated by President William Howard Taft on May 25, 1911, to a joint seat on the United States Court of Appeals for the First Circuit and the United States Circuit Courts for the First Circuit vacated by Judge Francis Cabot Lowell. He was confirmed by the United States Senate on June 6, 1911, and received his commission the same day. On December 31, 1911, the Circuit Courts were abolished and he thereafter served only on the Court of Appeals. His service terminated on June 10, 1912, due to his death.

== See also ==
- List of law clerks for the second seat of the Supreme Court of the United States

== Sources ==
Legal offices
| Preceded by Francis Cabot Lowell | Judge of the United States Circuit Courts for the First Circuit; 1911 | Succeeded by Seat abolished |
| Preceded by Francis Cabot Lowell | Judge of the United States Court of Appeals for the First Circuit; 1911–1912 | Succeeded by Frederic Dodge |
