= Patrick Cunningham (inventor) =

Irish inventor (1844–1921)

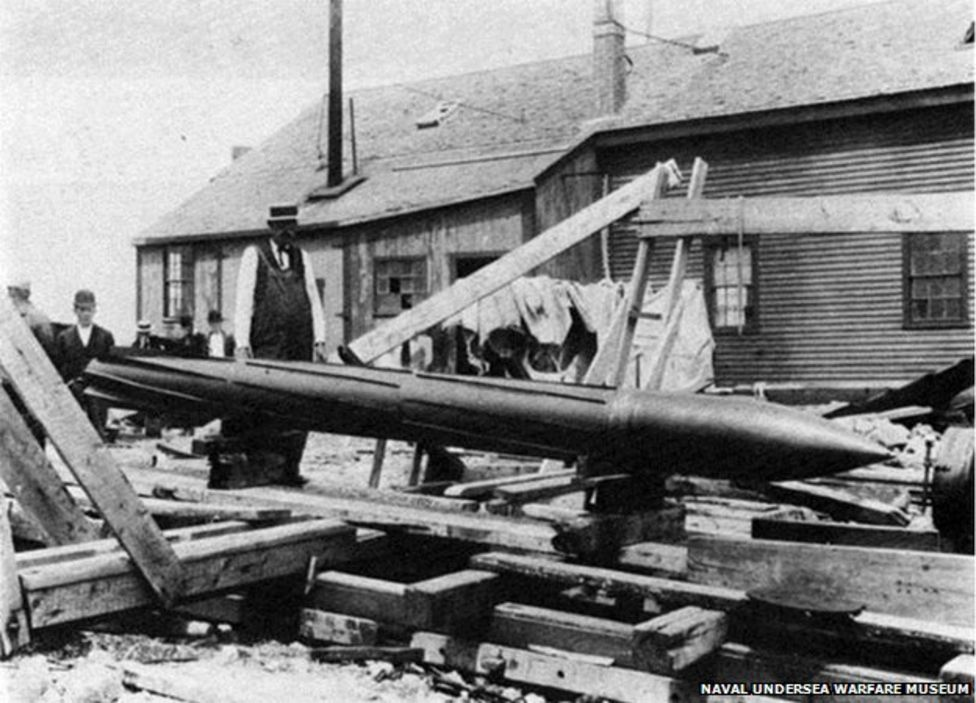
Patrick Cunningham standing with one of his torpedoes.

Patrick Cunningham (4 May 1844 – 23 May 1921), known locally as "Wild Cunningham", was an Irish inventor known for creating a torpedo which he fired down a New Bedford high street around the time of the 1896 United States presidential election.

== Biography ==
Cunningham immigrated to New Bedford, Massachusetts from Dundalk, Ireland at the age of nine. He trained with his father to become a cobbler, but joined the Union Navy during the American Civil War, where he became interested in engineering and explosives. He deserted the Navy in 1865 and returned to New Bedford, where he established a shoemaking business. His charge of desertion was removed from his record in 1892. Cunningham's cobbling business was very successful, and he became one of New Bedford's most wealthy residents.

== Inventions ==
Cunningham, along with fellow cobbler Bernard Cogan, created the Iron Cunningham & Cogan whaling gun, patented in 1877.

In 1892 Cunningham built a 17-foot-long torpedo named The Flying Devil, capable of carrying 125 pounds of explosive; ownership of the explosive went to the company of which he was president. The torpedo did not have propellers or screws as was typical for torpedoes, but instead had spirals around its body, in order to make it spin similar to that of a bullet fired from a rifle. It was tested at the U.S. Naval Torpedo Station in July 1893, and found to be unsuitable for use due to its short range and poor trajectory.

On October 31, 1896, towards the end of the presidential election, Cunningham fired the torpedo down New Bedford's high street during a rally for the Republican candidate, who he did not support. The torpedo travelled haphazardly down the street and crashed into a shop, which collapsed before the explosive detonated, causing massive structural damage to the surrounding buildings. Multiple people were injured in the blast, though no-one was killed. Cunningham was arrested and charged with maliciously destroying a building.

Cunningham went on to build more torpedoes, and in 1898 tested two of them by firing them from a schooner he had purchased. The first fired correctly, but the second exploded inside the ship and caused it to immediately sink; no one was hurt.
