= Farr (surname) =

Farr is a surname, and may refer to:

== A ==
- Albert L. Farr (1871—1947), American architect
- Amy Farr (born 1982), New Zealand rugby union player
- Asa W. Farr (1821–1863), American lawyer and politician
- Asahel Farr (1820–1887), American surgeon

== B ==
- Bruce Farr (born 1949), New Zealand yacht designer
- Bryan Farr (1924–2017), English cricketer and landowner

== C ==
- Charles Farr (builder) (c. 1812–1888), timber merchant and builder in South Australia
- Charles Farr (civil servant) (1959–2019), British civil servant, intelligence officer and diplomat
- Charlotte Farr (born 1988), Scottish cricketer
- Chick Farr (1914–1980), British football goalkeeper
- Coleridge Farr (1866–1943), New Zealand geophysicist, electrical engineer and academic

== D ==
- Dan Farr (born 1967), American technology entrepreneur
- David Farr (businessman) (born 1955), American business executive
- David Farr (theatre director) (born 1969), British writer and theatrical director
- Debi Farr (born c. 1955), American politician
- Deitra Farr (born 1957), American singer-songwriter
- Dennie L. Farr (1861–1909), American businessman and politician
- Dennis Farr (1929–2006), British art historian and curator
- Derek Farr (1912–1986), English actor
- Diane Farr (born 1969), American actress
- Diane Farr (writer), American historical romance novelist
- D'Marco Farr (born 1971), American football player
- Dorathy Farr (1910–1989), American artist
- Doug Farr, American architect and urban planner

== E ==
- Edith May Farr (1864–1956), American botanist
- Elizabeth Farr, American harpsichordist
- Ellen Frances Burpee Farr (1840–1907), American painter
- Evarts Worcester Farr (1840–1880), American politician

== F ==
- Felicia Farr (born 1932), American actress
- Finis Farr (1904–1982), American author
- Florence Farr (1860–1917), British stage actress and composer
- Fred Farr (1910–1997), American politician
- Frencheska Farr (born 1992), Filipina singer, actress and model

== G ==
- Gareth Farr (born 1968), New Zealand composer
- Gary Farr (1944–1994), English singer
- George A. Farr (1842–1914), American politician from Michigan
- George Henry Farr (1819–1904), Anglican priest and headmaster in South Australia
- George W. Farr (1875–1957), Justice of the Montana Supreme Court
- Glenn Farr (1946–2023), film and TV editor
- Grahame Farr (1912–1983), British maritime historian

== H ==
- Harry Farr (1891–1916), British soldier executed for cowardice
- Heather Farr (1965–1993), American golfer
- Helen Farr, British maritime archaeologist and prehistorian
- Henry V. Farr (1877–1958), American industrial chemist (Mallinckrodt)
- Hilary Farr (born 1951), Canadian reality television personality

== J ==
- Jack Farr (born 1946), US military intelligence officer
- James M. Farr (1874–1947), English language scholar and president of the University of Florida (1927–1928)
- James Farr (basketball) (born 1992), American basketball player
- Jamie Farr (born 1934), Lebanese-American actor
- Jim Farr (born 1956), American baseball player
- John R. Farr (1857–1933), American politician
- John Farr (British politician) (1922–1997), Conservative Party politician
- John Farr, nom-de-plume of novelist Jack Webb
- Jordan Farr (born 1994), American soccer goalkeeper
- Judi Farr (1938–2023), Australian actress
- Judy Farr (set decorator), British art director and set decorator
- Julia Farr (1824–1914), philanthropist in South Australia, wife of George Henry Farr

== K ==
- Kathryn Farr (born 1967), English discus athlete
- Kevin Farr (1951–2011), South African cricketer

== L ==
- Lee Farr (1927–2017), American actor
- Lorin Farr (1820–1909), American Mormon pioneer

== M ==
- Malcolm Farr (born 1951), Australian journalist
- Malcolm D. Farr (1884-1956), American businessman and politician
- Marcia E. Farr (born 1944), American sociolinguist and ethnographer
- Marie Leonore Farr (1927–2014), American mycologist
- Mark Farr (born 1968), Irish Gaelic footballer
- Martyn Farr (born 1951), Welsh caver
- Mary Noyes Farr (1853—1938), American osteopathic physician and suffragist
- Matthew Burrow Farr(1862–1941), British trade unionist and Labour Party politician
- Mel Farr (1944–2015), American football player and businessman
- Mel Farr Jr. (born 1966), American football player, son of Mel Farr
- Michael Farr (born 1953), British Tintin expert
- Michael K. Farr, American author
- Mike Farr (born 1967), American football player, son of Mel Farr
- Miller Farr (1943–2023), American football player, brother of Mel Farr

== N ==
- Nick Farr-Jones (born 1962), Australian rugby union player

== O ==
- Oliver Farr (born 1988), Welsh golfer

== P ==
- Patricia Farr (1913–1948), American movie actress

== R ==
- Rocky Farr (born 1947), Canadian ice hockey goaltender
- Robert Maclaughlin Farr (1936–2013), Northern Irish social psychologist
- Russell B. Farr, Australian editor and writer of speculative fiction

== S ==
- Sam Farr (born 1941), American politician
- Samuel Farr (architect) (1827–1918), builder and architect in New Zealand
- Samuel Farr (physician) (1741–1795), English physician
- Shana Farr, Colombian singer and actress
- Simeon Farr, American 19th-century politician
- Snowy Farr (1919–2007), English charity fundraiser
- Stephen Farr (born 1967), British organist
- Steve Farr (born 1956), American baseball player

== T ==
- Thena Mae Farr (1927–1985), National Cowgirl Museum and Hall of Fame inductee
- Thomas Farr (1954–2024), American attorney
- Tommy Farr (1913–1986), Welsh boxer
- Tracy Farr (born 1962), New Zealand writer and scientist
- Tyler Farr (born 1984), American country music singer

== W ==
- Wanda Kirkbride Farr (1895–1983), American botanist
- William Farr (1807–1883), British epidemiologist
- William C. Farr (1841–1921), fifth Mayor of Bayonne, New Jersey

== See also ==
- Pfarr
- Fara (surname)
