= Samuel Farr =

Samuel Farr may refer to:

- Sam Farr (born 1941), member of the U.S. House of Representatives
- Samuel Farr (architect) (1827–1918), Christchurch architect
- Samuel Farr (physician) (1741–1795), English physician
