= Keith Hill =

Keith Hill may refer to:

- Keith Hill (politician) (born 1943), British politician
- Keith Hill (musical instrument maker) (born 1948)
- Keith Hill (footballer) (born 1969), English football player and manager

== See also ==
- Keith Hills Country Club, a residential golf course community in Buies Creek, North Carolina, US
- Hill (surname), a surname (including a list of people with the name)
