= Farr =

Farr may refer to:

- Farr Alpaca Company
- Farr, Sutherland, a hamlet in, and alternate name of, Strathnaver, Scotland.
- Farr, Strathnairn, a village in Strathnairn, to the south of Inverness, Scotland
- Farr Yacht Design
- Farr (surname), people with the surname Farr
- Forţele Aeriene Regale ale României (FARR), Royal Romanian Air Force
- Farr, a former US air filtration company listed on NASDAQ, now part of Camfil Farr
- Farr, the Zoroastrian concept of God's favor, also called khvarenah

== See also ==
- Farr West, Utah, a US city
