= Douglas P. Woodlock =

American judge (born 1947)

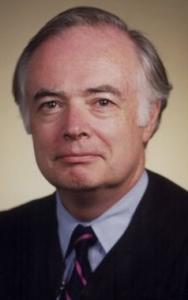

Senior Judge of the United States District Court for the District of Massachusetts
- Incumbent
- Assumed office June 1, 2015

Judge of the United States District Court for the District of Massachusetts
- In office June 16, 1986 – June 1, 2015
- Appointed by: Ronald Reagan
- Preceded by: W. Arthur Garrity Jr.
- Succeeded by: Angel Kelley

Personal details
- Born: Douglas Preston Woodlock; February 27, 1947 (age 79) Hartford, Connecticut, U.S.
- Education: Yale University (BA); Georgetown University (JD)

Douglas Preston Woodlock (born February 27, 1947) is a United States district judge of the United States District Court for the District of Massachusetts. Born in Connecticut, Woodlock graduated from Yale College and worked as a journalist before attending Georgetown University Law Center. After graduating, Woodlock was a lawyer in private practice at Goodwin, Procter & Hoar, and had stints at the U.S. Securities and Exchange Commission and U.S. Attorney's Office for the District of Massachusetts. Appointed to the federal bench in 1986, Woodlock presided over a number of noteworthy cases and was a key figure in the construction of the John Joseph Moakley United States Courthouse on the Boston waterfront. He assumed senior status in 2015.

== Early life and education ==
Woodlock was born in Hartford, Connecticut, on February 27, 1947. His family moved to the Chicago suburb of La Grange, Illinois, where Woodlock spent the first two years of high school. He spent his last two years of high school at Phillips Academy in Andover, Massachusetts.

Woodlock received a Bachelor of Arts degree from Yale College in 1969, where he was a member of Skull and Bones, and vice chairman of the Yale Daily News. He began his career in journalism as an intern at the Chicago Daily News, covering the 1968 Democratic National Convention in Chicago. Woodlock then became a reporter at the Chicago Sun-Times from 1969 to 1973, where he worked in Chicago and Springfield, Illinois, before moving to the Sun-Times's Washington Bureau in 1971–1973, where he covered the Supreme Court. Woodlock then attended Georgetown University Law Center, where he was a member of The Georgetown Law Journal. He earned his Juris Doctor in 1975.

== Career ==
Woodlock worked in the Office of Chief Counsel for the Division of Corporation Finance at the U.S. Securities and Exchange Commission from 1973 to 1975 and was a law clerk for Judge Frank Jerome Murray of the United States District Court for the District of Massachusetts from 1975 to 1976.

He was in private practice in Boston from 1976 to 1979 as an associate at the law firm of Goodwin, Procter & Hoar, before becoming an Assistant United States Attorney in the U.S. Attorney's Office for the District of Massachusetts, serving under U.S. Attorneys Edward F. Harrington and Bill Weld. He was assigned to the Justice Department's New England Task Force from 1982 to 1983. Woodlock returned to Goodwin, Procter & Hoar in 1983, where he was made a partner in 1984, and remained at the firm until his appointment to the federal bench. Woodlock was also chairman of the Board of Appeals for the Town of Hamilton from 1978 to 1979; an instructor at Harvard Law School in 1980 and 1981; and chairman of the Massachusetts Committee for Public Counsel Services from 1984 to 1986.

=== Federal judicial service ===
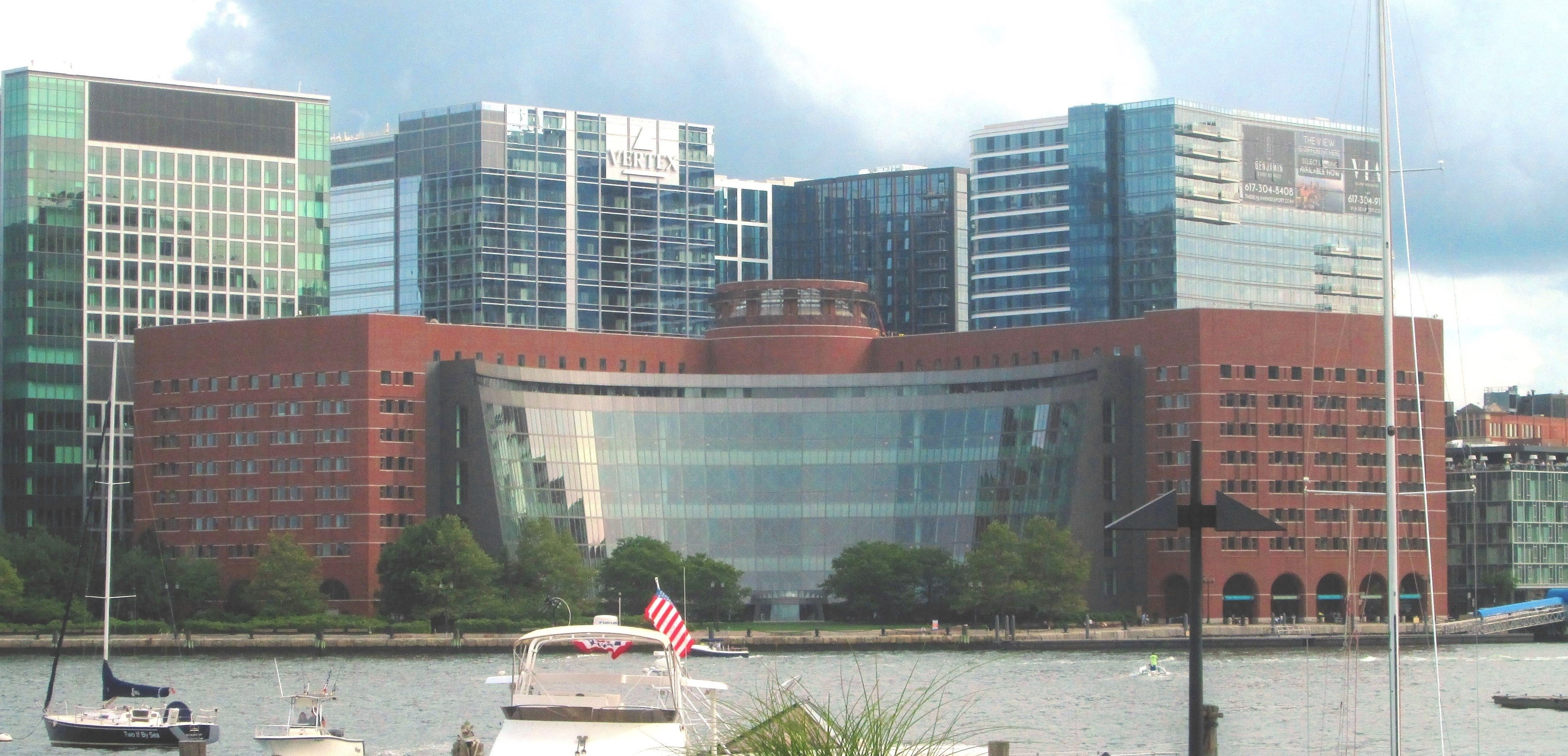
Woodlock was closely involved in the design of Boston's waterfront John Joseph Moakley United States Courthouse.

Woodlock was nominated by President Ronald Reagan on April 22, 1986, to a seat on the U.S. District Court for the District of Massachusetts vacated by Judge Wendell Arthur Garrity Jr. He was confirmed by the United States Senate on June 13, 1986, on a voice vote, and received his commission three days later. He assumed senior status on June 1, 2015.

Woodlock is known for his interest in architecture and public art. He was a leading figure in the design of the John Joseph Moakley United States Courthouse, a new federal courthouse on the Boston waterfront, working with Justice Stephen G. Breyer on the project. Linda Greenhouse noted that both Woodlock and Breyer took "an intense hands-on role" in the development of the courthouse, which was designed by architect Henry N. Cobb of Pei Cobb Freed & Partners. In 1996, the American Institute of Architects honored Woodlock with its Thomas Jefferson Award for Public Architecture for his efforts.

Woodlock is a member of the American Law Institute and the American Judicature Society. He also served on the Committee on Space and Facilities of the Judicial Conference of the United States.

=== Notable civil cases ===
In 1989, Woodlock presided over a lawsuit brought by Jugoplastika, a Yugoslavian basketball team, against the Boston Celtics. Jugoplastika brought the suit after the Celtics had drafted basketball player Dino Radja, alleging that Radja still had two years remaining on a 1988 contract with Jugoplastika. Woodlock issued a preliminary injunction barring Radja from playing for the Celtics for two years. In October 1989, the Celtics and the Jugoplastika reached a settlement, under which the Celtics partially bought out Radja's contract with Jugoplastika, so that Radja would play for Jugoplastika during the 1989–90 season, but could play for the Celtics starting in the 1990–91 season.

In a 1995 suit under the Alien Tort Claims Act, Woodlock ordered Hector Gramajo, a former Guatemalan general and defense minister, to pay $47.5 million in damages to nine plaintiffs, for his role in overseeing a campaign of repression and human rights abuses during the Guatemalan Civil War. The plaintiffs were eight Gutamalean Canjobal indigenous people and American nun Dianna Ortiz, who brought claims for human rights violations that included the razing of Canjobal villages and the torture of Ortiz. In his ruling, Woodlock wrote: "Gramajo was aware of and supported widespread acts of brutality committed under his command resulting in thousands of civilian deaths. The evidence suggests that Gramajo devised and directed the implementation of an indiscriminate campaign of terror against civilians."

In 2008, Woodlock presided over a case involving the Massachusetts Bay Transportation Authority (MBTA), in which he issued an injunction barring three students at the Massachusetts Institute of Technology from disclosing security vulnerabilities in the MBTA's CharlieCard system; the decision was controversial, and resulting press attention resulted in further publicity of the security lapse.

Woodlock was the judge who presided over litigation between the South Middlesex Opportunity Council, an anti-poverty group, and the Town of Framingham and its officials. The Opportunity Council filed suit in 2007, alleging that the town government had violated the Americans with Disabilities Act and federal fair housing laws by, among other things, delaying the permitting process for the construction of housing for recovering drug addicts and homeless veterans. In September 2010, Woodlock issued a lengthy opinion denying the town's motion to dismiss the suit, and the parties reached a settlement the following month, in which the Town paid $1 million and agreed to have officials undergo civil rights training.

In 2011, Woodlock dismissed an attempt by the Winklevoss twins and their partner Divya Narendra to reopen litigation on their claims related to Facebook; the Winklevosses had settled their claims in a $65 million settlement in 2008.

In 2020, Woodlock issued a preliminary order directing the Commonwealth of Massachusetts to allow gun stores (but not shooting ranges) to reopen, overruling Governor Charlie Baker's executive order to the extent it excluded gun retailers from a list of essential retailers permitted to remain open during the coronavirus pandemic. Applying intermediate scrutiny to the Second Amendment question, Woodlock found that the commonwealth had failed to establish "a substantial fit between the goals of the emergency declared by the commonwealth and the burdening of the constitutional rights," noting that liquor stores were deemed essential but gun retailers were not. The judge's order did require gun shops who reopened to follow a ten-point plan adopted by the state to limit the spread of the virus, including social distancing requirements, sales by appointment only, wearing of masks by employees and customers, and sanitation requirements.

=== Notable criminal cases ===
Woodlock has presided over a number of noteworthy criminal cases. In 2005, Woodlock accepted a plea agreement between federal prosecutors and Ahmed F. Mehalba, a translator at the detention camp at the Guantanamo Bay Naval Base, who pleaded guilty to removing a disc containing classified documents from the base. Woodlock sentenced Mehalba to 20 months in prison. In 2010, Woodlock sentenced computer hacker Albert Gonzalez to 20 years and one day in prison, after Gonzalez pleaded guilty the previous year to hacking Heartland Payment Systems' corporate computer system as part of a scheme to steal millions of payment card numbers.

In 2010, Woodlock accepted the guilty plea of Dianne Wilkerson, a former member of the Massachusetts Senate who pleaded guilty to attempted extortion and admitted that she had accepted bribes, and the next year, Woodlock sentenced her to three and a half years in prison. Also in 2011, Woodlock sentenced former Boston city councilor Chuck Turner to three years in prison for accepting a $1,000 bribe, citing Turner's false statements to the FBI and "ludicrously perjurious testimony" as reasons for the sentence. In 2012, Woodlock sentenced Catherine E. Greig, the longtime companion of Boston organized crime figure James "Whitey" Bulger, to eight years in jail. Greig pleaded guilty to harboring Bulger while he was a fugitive from justice. The sentence was affirmed on appeal. In 2014, Woodlock oversaw the criminal proceedings against two friends of Boston Marathon bomber Dzhokhar Tsarnaev, who were convicted of obstruction of justice for destroying evidence and lying to authorities who were investigating the crime. In 2019, Woodlock was the judge assigned to the criminal case against Jeffrey Bizzack, a California businessman who was one of many parents charged in the Varsity Blues admissions bribery scandal. Bizzack pleaded guilty to conspiracy to commit fraud in connection with a scheme to get his son admitted to the University of Southern California as a fake recruited athlete; Woodlock sentenced Bizzack to two months in prison, three years of supervised release, and a $250,000 fine.

== Publications ==
- Communities and the Courthouses They Deserve. And Vice Versa., 24 Yale Journal of Law & the Humanities (2012).
- "Drawing Meaning from the Heart of the Courthouse" in Celebrating the Courthouse: A Guide for Architects, Their Clients, and the Public (ed. Steven Flanders: New York: W.W. Norton: 2006).
- "Judicial Responsibility in Federal Courthouse Design Review: Intentions and Aspirations for Boston" in Federal Buildings in Context: The Role of Design Review (ed. J. Carter Brown: Yale University Press, 1995).

Legal offices
Preceded by W. Arthur Garrity Jr.	Judge of the United States District Court for the District of Massachusetts; 1986–2015	Succeeded by Angel Kelley
