= Simeon Farr =

Reconstruction Era American politician

Simeon Farr was an American politician who was elected as a state representative in 1868 in South Carolina during the Reconstruction era. He represented Union County, South Carolina. His photograph was used in a composite of Radical Republican officials from South Carolina. His name is spelled Simon Farr in an 1868 House document.

== 1868 Constitutional Convention ==
The 1868 convention demonstrated that black males could dominate South Carolina politics. At the constitutional convention held on 14 January 1868, nearly all delegates were Republicans and fifty nine percent of delegates were black, including all three representatives from Union County: Junius S. Mobles, Simeon Farr, and Samuel Nuckles. The convention accomplished substantial reforms, including the protection of voting rights and educational reform. When the state held elections the following April, blacks and Republicans again swept the election, and they passed the new state constitution, ratified the Fourteenth Amendment, and oversaw South Carolina’s readmission into the Union. Ironically, readmission meant that the U.S. Army would play a diminished role in civil affairs, clearing the way for insurgent conservatives to unleash an extralegal campaign of violence and terror in order to reassert their rule.

== See also ==
- List of African-American officeholders during Reconstruction
