= Angel Kelley =

American judge (born 1967)

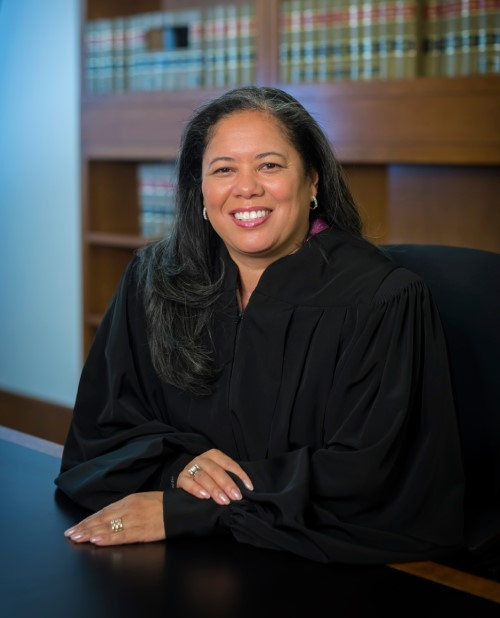
- Kelley in 2021

Judge of the United States District Court for the District of Massachusetts
- Incumbent
- Assumed office September 15, 2021
- Appointed by: Joe Biden
- Preceded by: Douglas P. Woodlock

Judge of the Massachusetts Superior Court
- In office 2013 – September 15, 2021
- Appointed by: Charlie Baker

Judge of the Brockton District Court
- In office 2009–2013
- Appointed by: Deval Patrick

Personal details
- Born: 1967 (age 58–59) New Rochelle, New York, U.S.
- Education: Colgate University (BA); Georgetown University (JD); Temple University (LLM)

Angel Kelley (born 1967) is an American attorney and judge serving as a United States district judge of the United States District Court for the District of Massachusetts. She is a former associate justice of the Massachusetts Superior Court.

== Early life and education ==
Kelley was born in New Rochelle, New York, in 1967, growing up with three brothers. Her father was an overnight truck driver originally from Selma, Alabama; her mother had immigrated from Japan following World War II after marrying a U.S. soldier and found work as a supermarket meat packer in New York following a divorce.

Following her father's death, Kelley attended college and received her Bachelor of Arts from Colgate University in 1989, her Juris Doctor from Georgetown University in 1992, and her Master of Laws in trial advocacy from Temple University in 2003.

== Legal and academic career ==
Kelley began her legal career as a staff attorney at The Legal Aid Society in the Juvenile Rights Division in Brooklyn, New York from 1993 to 1997. From 1997 to 2005, she was an attorney for the Port Authority of New York and New Jersey. From 2007 to 2009, Kelley served as an Assistant United States Attorney for the United States Attorney's Office for the District of Massachusetts.

From 1992 to 2005, she was a part-time instructor at Columbia University. From 2004 to 2005 she was a part-time instructor at New York University. From 2005 to 2007, she was a clinical instructor at Harvard Law School. Since 2012, she has been a part-time adjunct professor at Suffolk University Law School. Since 2016, she has been a volunteer instructor at Emory University School of Law and since 2018, she has been a part-time adjunct professor at Boston University School of Law.

== Judicial career ==
=== State judicial service ===
In 2009, she was appointed to the Brockton District Court by Governor Deval Patrick and sworn in on September 17, 2010. On January 4, 2013, she was nominated to be a judge of the Massachusetts Superior Court and confirmed to the position on January 24, 2013, in a 6–2 vote.

=== Federal judicial service ===
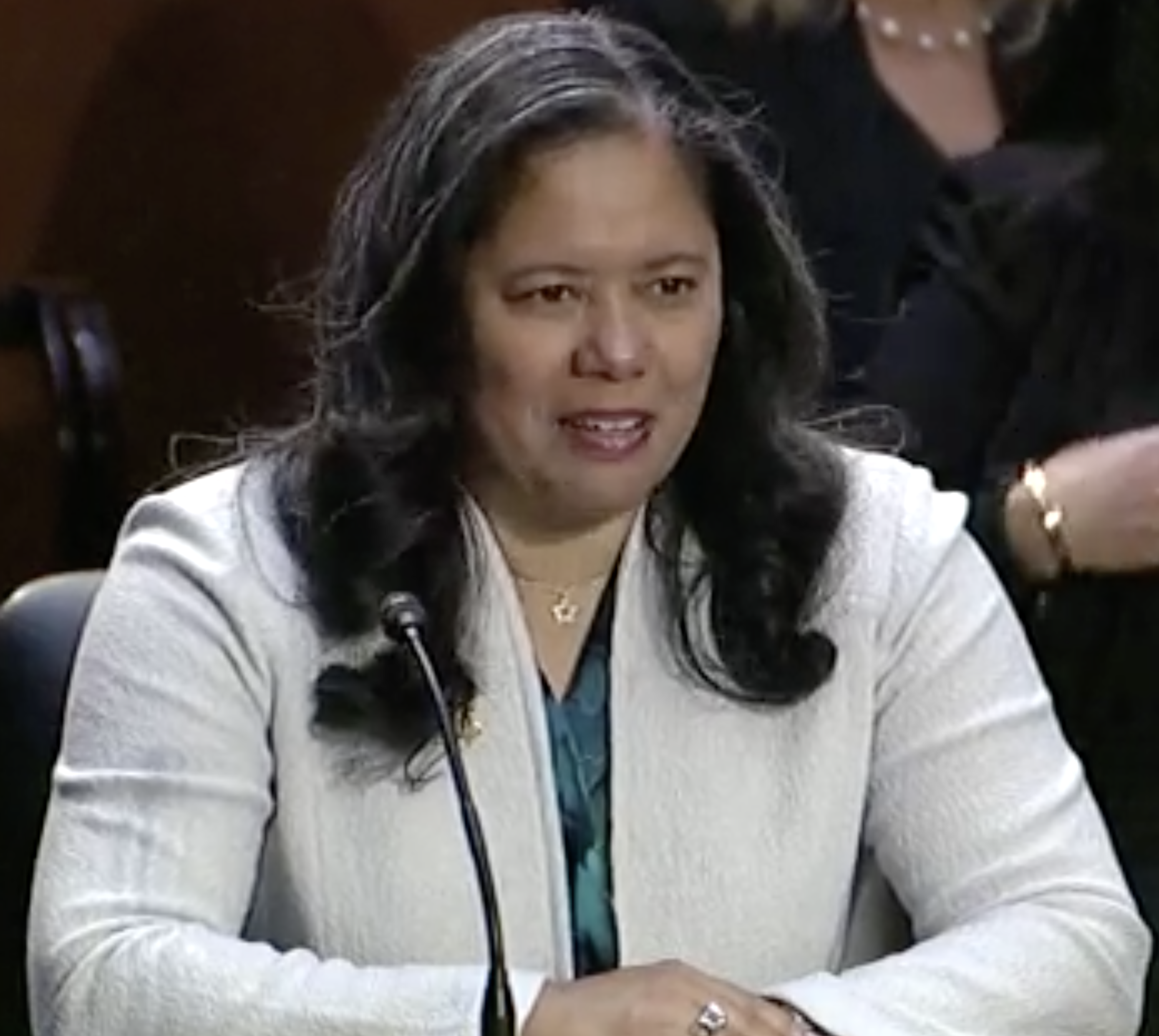
Angel Kelley U.S. Senate Judiciary Committee hearing

On May 12, 2021, President Joe Biden nominated Kelley to serve as a United States district judge for the United States District Court for the District of Massachusetts to the seat vacated by Judge Douglas P. Woodlock, who assumed senior status on June 1, 2015. On June 23, 2021, a hearing on her nomination was held before the Senate Judiciary Committee. On July 22, 2021, her nomination was reported out of committee by a 15–7 vote. On September 14, 2021, the United States Senate invoked cloture on her nomination by a 52–43 vote. Her nomination was confirmed later that day by a 52–44 vote. She received her judicial commission on September 15, 2021, and was sworn in the same day. She is the second African American female judge and the second Asian American judge to serve on the U.S. District Court in Massachusetts.

==== Notable rulings ====
On February 7, 2025, the office of the NIH Director (Matthew J. Memoli), acting under guidance of the second Trump administration, introduced a Notice stating that the NIH would fund the portion of higher educational institution research grants termed indirect costs–typically covering institutional overhead expenses including depreciation, research facility maintenance, and research staff support—at a fixed level of 15%, discarding the generally much higher indirect cost percentages that had been previously negotiated for grants in effect to individual institutions. A coalition of the attorneys general for 22 states (Note: The states were Arizona, California, Connecticut, Colorado, Delaware, Hawaii, Illinois, Maine, Maryland, Massachusetts, Michigan, Minnesota, Nevada, New Jersey, New Mexico, New York, North Carolina, Oregon, Rhode Island, Vermont, Washington, and Wisconsin, see Commonwealth of Massachusetts, et al. and Choi, The Hill, op. cit.) sued the NIH, and Kelley granted a temporary restraining order, effectively blocking the rule from taking effect on February 10. The New York Times and Forbes.com subsequently reported that Judge Kelley expanded the ruling to cover institutions nationwide "in response to another lawsuit filed by university associations and major research centers". Kelley granted a nationwide preliminary injunction on March 5, effectively blocking the 15% cap indefinitely, as litigation proceeds. On, April 4, 2025, The New York Times reported: "A federal judge [Kelley] permanently barred the Trump administration on Friday from limiting funding from the National Institutes of Health that supports research at universities and academic medical centers, restoring billions of dollars in grant money but setting up an almost certain appeal. The ruling by Judge Angel Kelley, of the Federal District Court in Massachusetts, made an earlier temporary order by her permanent and was one of the first final decisions in the barrage of lawsuits against the Trump administration." The First Circuit unanimously affirmed Kelley's decision on January 5, 2026.

== See also ==
- List of African-American federal judges
- List of African-American jurists
- List of Asian American jurists

== Notes ==
Legal offices
Preceded by Douglas P. Woodlock	Judge of the United States District Court for the District of Massachusetts; 2021–present	Incumbent
