= Jack Farr =

US Army officer (born 1946)

- Born: 1946 (age 79–80)
- Occupation: army reserve officer
- Known for: illegally transported classified documents

Colonel Jack Farr is a former Army officer specializing in military intelligence, who was deployed to camp Camp Delta at the U.S. naval base at Guantánamo Bay, Cuba. USA Today reported that Farr was in charge of all interrogations, at Guantanamo. The Washington Times reported "investigators hoped that by formally charging Col. Farr, they might obtain information from him about breaches of security in which he or others may have been involved."

Colonel Farr was the fourth serviceman charged with violating security procedures at Guantanamo detention base. The others were Captain James Yee, a Muslim chaplain, and Ahmed F. Mehalba, Arabic translators. Observers noted that although Farr faced similar charges to Yess, Yee spent months in solitary confinement, while Farr was not incarcerated.

Farr was charged with "wrongfully transporting classified material without the proper security container on or around October 11", and lying to investigators.

Because Farr did not represent a "flight risk" he was not arrested or suspended. In contrast to Farr, Yee and Ahmad were held in solitary confinement. In 2009 the Senate Armed Service Committee published a report entitled "Inquiry Into the Treatment of Detainees in U.S. Custody". That report quoted an email exchange between Farr, and Major James Rogers that described how sleep deprivation was used on subject's undergoing interrogation. The memo described how, after moving individuals from one cell to another, every half-hour, for extended periods, so that they were deprived of sleep and were disoriented, "the fun begins again..."
