= Pfarr =

Pfarr is a surname. Notable people with this surname include:

- Bernd Pfarr (de) (1958–2004), German painter and cartoonist, author of Sondermann
- Frederick Pfarr Stamp Jr. (born 1934), American judge
- Paul Pfarr, character in March Violets
- Robert Pfarr (1920–2006), American cyclist

== See also ==
- Pfarr Log House, Ohio, United States
- Farr (surname)
