= Steve Ross (cabaret singer) =

American cabaret singer

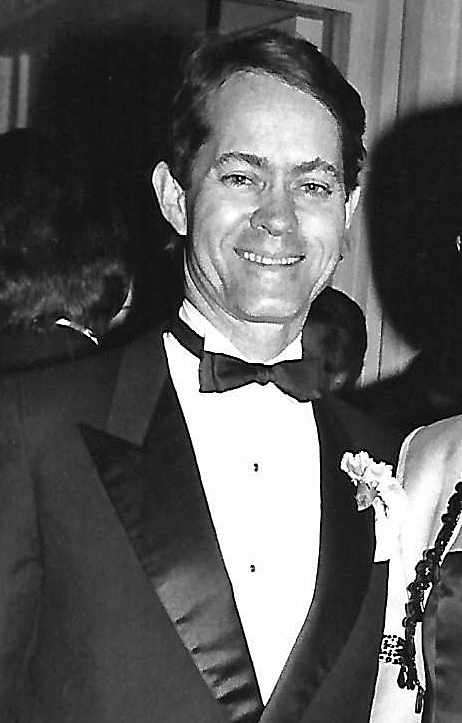
- Steve Ross at a charity event at the Waldorf Astoria in New York City, November 1988

Background information
- Born: Steven Richard Ross; December 8, 1938 (age 87); New Rochelle, New York, United States
- Genres: The Great American Songbook
- Occupations: Singer, pianist
- Instruments: Vocals, piano
- Years active: 1963–present
- Label: Stolen Moments
- Website: Official website

Steven Richard Ross (born December 8, 1938) is an American cabaret singer and pianist, known for his interpretations of the Great American Songbook, particularly the music of George Gershwin, Cole Porter, Irving Berlin and Noël Coward. He is a revivalist of popular compositions from the early-to-mid 20th century, including ragtime, Tin Pan Alley, show tunes, musical theatre and patter songs. Ross has been dubbed "the Crown Prince of Cabaret", and his personal style described as "the epitome of sophisticated 'cafe' cabaret". Regarding his interpretations of Cole Porter, fellow cabaret pianist Michael Feinstein noted that Ross has, "an ability to create a reserve or an 'arch' quality that certain of his songs require and that eludes" other performers.

== Early life ==
Born Steven Richard Ross in New Rochelle, New York, and raised on the family gentleman's farm in nearby Millbrook, where he first learned to play piano. His family later relocated to Bethesda, Maryland. There Ross attended the Jesuit-run Gonzaga College High School, where he was a classmate of American political commentator Pat Buchanan, before matriculating at Georgetown University. After being honorably discharged from the United States Army in 1963, he began playing piano professionally among the saloons and nightclubs of Washington, D.C.

== Career ==
First gaining notoriety as a cabaret performer in the late 1970s during his residency at the Theatre District, Manhattan venue Ted Hook's Backstage, Ross was described as having, "boyish vivacity and skill as an accompanist [that] encouraged many stars to rise and perform...", including Ginger Rogers, Kay Thompson, and Liza Minnelli.

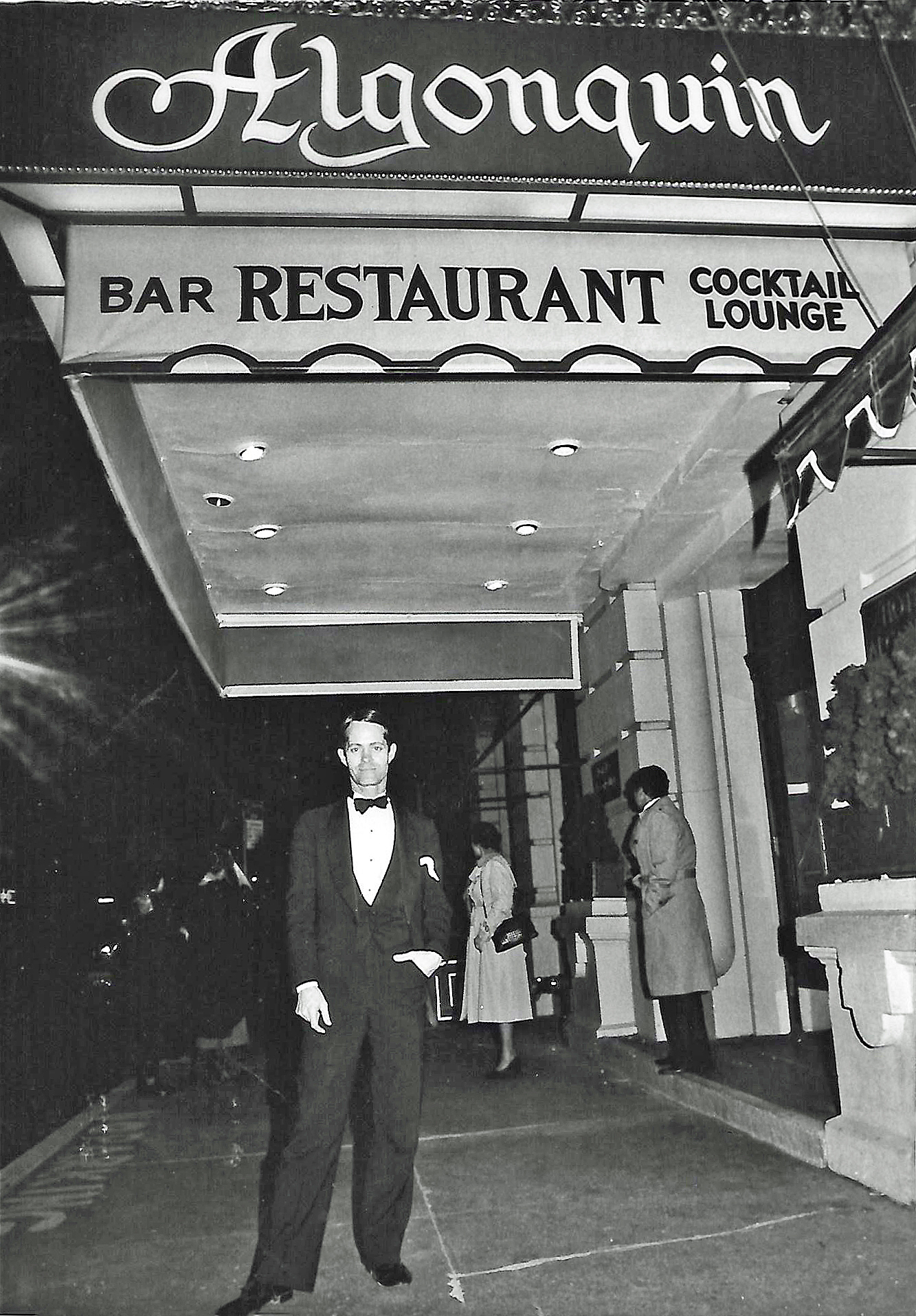
Steve Ross outside the entrance to the Algonquin Hotel, New York, 1981

In 1980, under the direction of Donald F. Smith, founder of the Mabel Mercer Foundation, Ross began a successful residency in the Oak Room of the Algonquin Hotel. Cabaret historian James Gavin noted, "...For four seasons Ross provided the sorts nights that an older generation of New Yorkers had grown to miss and that a substantial young audience had yet to discover." During his Oak Room residency Ross recorded and released his first commercial album 'Steve Ross Live at The Algonquin'. The cover art featured a portrait of Ross created by caricaturist Al Hirschfeld. The Oak Room would later host other cabaret artist including Michael Feinstein, Andrea Marcovicci, Susannah McCorkle, and jazz-oriented performers Diana Krall, Harry Connick Jr. and John Pizzarelli.

Ross made a cameo appearance as himself in the 1988 fantasy-comedy film "Big", directed by Penny Marshall and starring Tom Hanks. In 1996, Ross appeared on Broadway with Frank Langella in the Scott Elliott revival of the Noël Coward play Present Laughter.

Other notable venues where Ross has performed during his five-decade career include Lincoln Center for the Performing Arts, the Ritz in London, the Spoleto Festival, the Hong Kong Arts Festival, the Perth International Arts Festival and Metropolitan Museum of Art. Ross has played alongside cabaret and jazz performers including ragtime pioneer Eubie Blake, Karen Akers, Judy Carmichael, Shana Farr, and Vince Giordano. He has also hosted broadcasts on National Public Radio and the BBC Television.

== Awards and recognition ==
In 2004, Ross was presented with the Nightlife Award for 'Outstanding Cabaret Male Vocalist'. The Mabel Mercer Foundation awarded him with a 'Mabel Award' in 2006. He received a MAC Lifetime Achievement award from the Manhattan Association of Cabarets & Clubs in 2015; and in 2016 Ross was inducted into the Cabaret Hall of Fame.

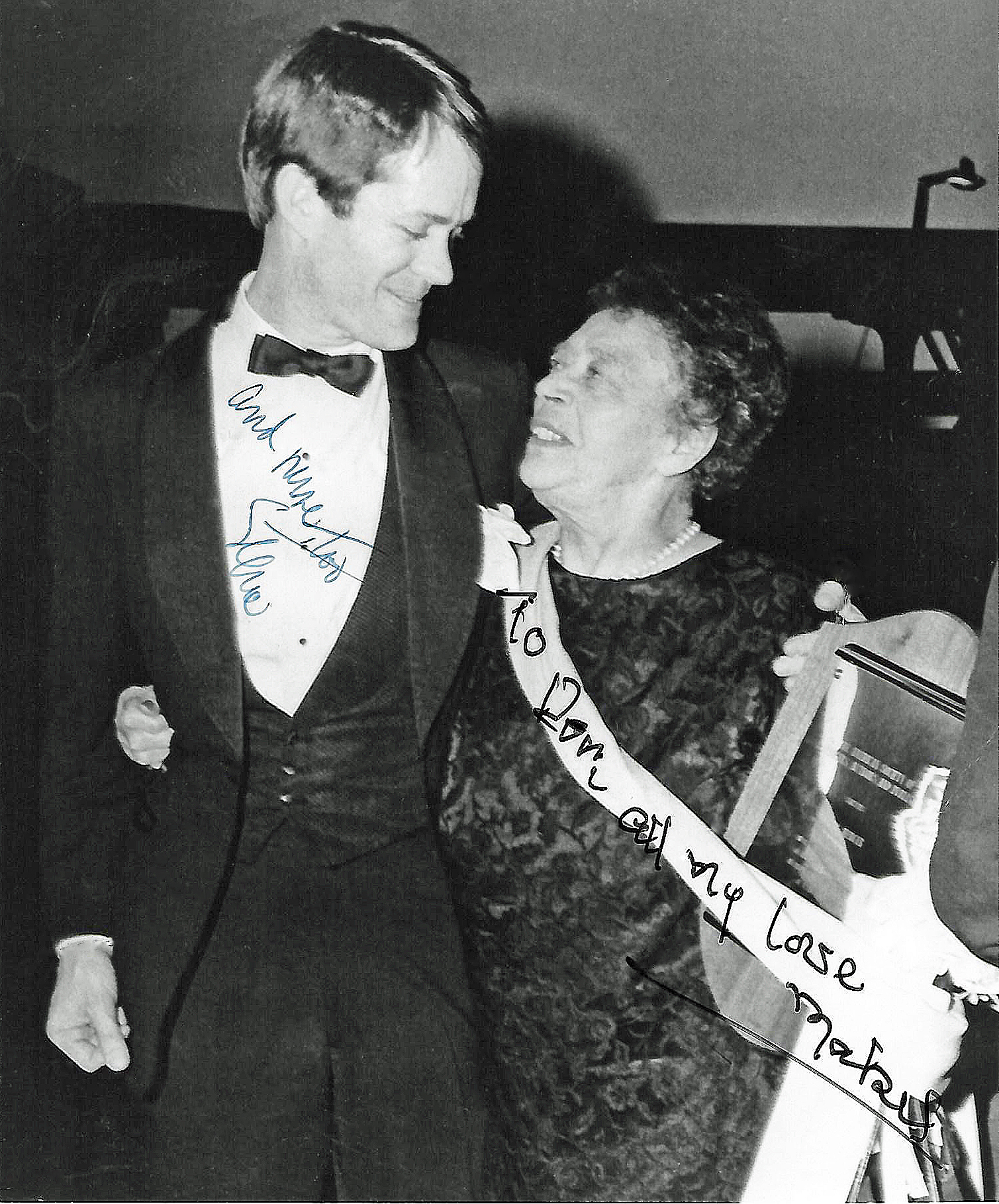
Steve Ross with Mabel Mercer, New York, 1982

== Personal life ==
Ross has lived on the Upper West Side of Manhattan since the early 1970s. He continues to perform regularly at nightclubs, cultural events and private parties around the world.

== Discography ==
- 1979 Steve Ross, (Stolen Moments)
- 1981 Steve Ross Live at the Algonquin' (Stolen Moments)
- 1986 At the Don Burrows Supper Club (ABC)
- 1988 Most of Ev'ry Day (Audiophile Records)
- 1995 Steve Ross & Cole Porter (Sophisticated)
- 2000 Travels with My Piano (Original Cast)
- 2002 Live at the Algonquin (Original Cast Reissue)
- 2003 I Won't Dance (Ligeti)
- 2003 Ross Redux (Stolen Moments)
- 2009 I Remember Him Well: The Songs of Alan Jay Lerner (LML Music)
- 2015 Good Thing Going: The Songs of Stephen Sondheim (Harbinger Records)
