= Shana Farr =

American singer and actress

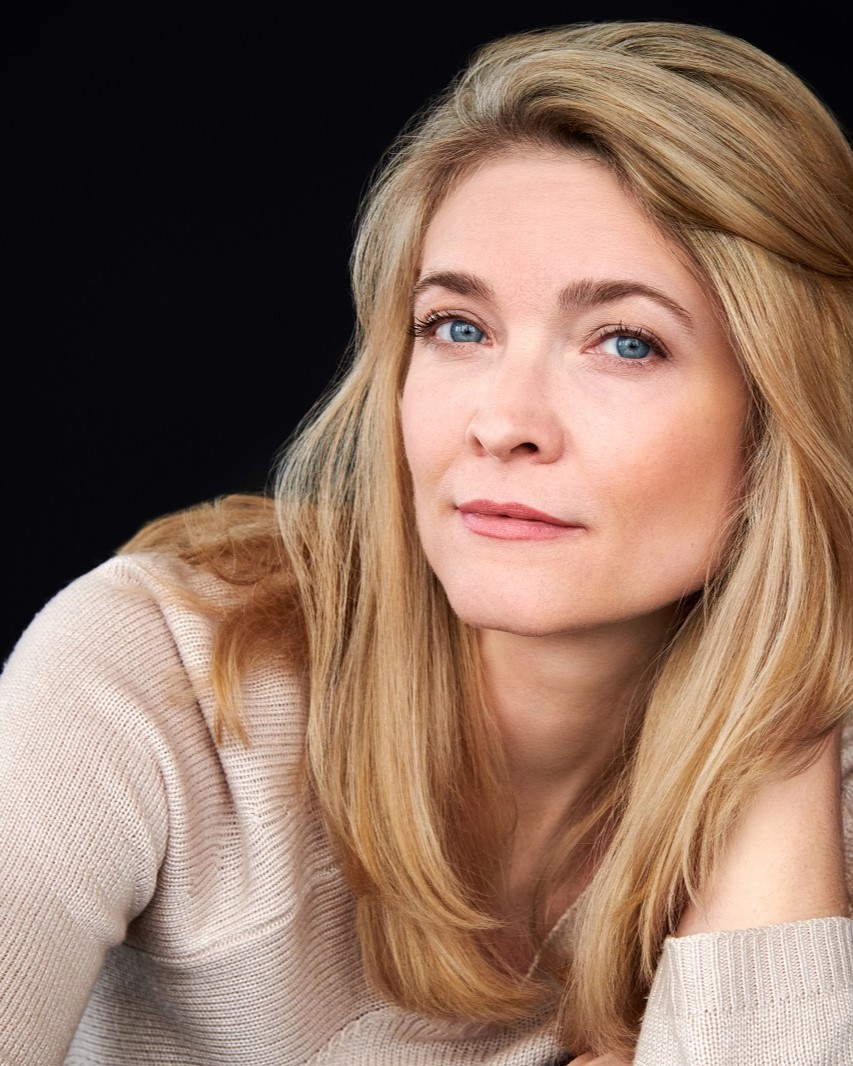

Background information
- Born: Columbia, Missouri, U.S.
- Occupations: Singer; Actress; Concert and cabaret artist
- Website: www.shanafarr.com

Shana Farr is a New York City-based singer and Actor known for her performances in operetta, musical theater, cabaret and concert.

== Early life and education ==
She is from Columbia, Missouri, and graduated from Hickman High School. She graduated with a B.M. in Voice Performance from Boston University College of Fine Arts. She continued her training in New York City under Doris Yarick-Cross of the Yale Opera Program and Carol Kirkpatrick, and studied acting with Ed Kovens.

== Theater ==
Farr has performed leading roles in New York City as well as in regional productions, earning praise for both her "impressive vocalizing" and acting versatility. Her roles include Marion Paroo in The Music Man, Hanna Glawari in The Merry Widow, Laurey Williams in Oklahoma!, and Elsie Maynard in The Yeomen of the Guard with New York Gilbert and Sullivan Players. She also appeared as Ruth Condomine in Noël Coward’s Blithe Spirit and Titania/Hippolyta in A Midsummer Night's Dream.

She has performed on major stages including New York City Center, McCarter Theatre, the Missouri Theater and with Pittsburgh Civic Light Opera. With a soprano voice described as both lyric and crystalline, Farr often bridges the gap between opera and musical theater, bringing classical technique to Broadway standards and vice versa.

== Concert and Cabaret ==
Farr work in this genre pays homage to the Great American Songbook and Broadway legends, such as Julie Andrews and Barbara Cook, often blending storytelling with impeccable musicianship. "Shana is a first-rate actor, unafraid to take big risks, both vocally and physically. She does not hold back, and she is exciting to watch." Writing for The Wall Street Journal, Will Friedwald praised her "delightfully old-fashioned, pure operetta chops."

Farr has long worked with music director Jon Weber on her solo shows and album Out of the Shadows. She also collaborates with cabaret legend Steve Ross.

Her 2009 cabaret debut show Pure Imagination at Laurie Beechman Theatre launched her cabaret career. She then headlined at supper clubs such as Feinstein's at The Regency and recurring appearances at Feinstein's/54 Below in New York City; at The Crazy Coqs (Brasserie Zedel) where "she made a triumphant London debut," and at The Pheasantry.

Farr has performed solo concerts at performing arts centers throughout the U.S.; and as a guest solo artist for the Mabel Mercer Foundation at venues such as Jazz at Lincoln Center's Rose Theater, Town Hall, and Carnegie Hall's Weill Recital Hall.

In 2022, she was invited to sing at Westminster Abbey for a prestigious special stone-laying ceremony in Poets' Corner honoring the great British actor John Gielgud. Also in this special program produced by John F. Andrews of the Shakespeare Guild were eminent British actors including Ian McKellen, Judi Dench, and former Director of Royal National Theatre, Richard Eyre.

In June 2026, Farr returned to Weill Recital Hall Carnegie Hall to present the world premiere of Lullaby, a work written for her (soprano), cello, and piano by composer James Adler. She performed the premiere with Adler at the piano and cellist Igor Zubkovsky.

== Awards ==
| YEAR | AWARD | |
|---|---|---|
| 2026 | Telly Award (Bronze) | Producer, Creative Encounters, Episode 1 (Pilot) |
| 2018 | Mable Mercer Foundation Award | The Donald F. Smith Award |
| 2014 | Bistro Award | Best Concept Show In the Still of the Night |
| 2012 | Mable Mercer Foundation Award | The Julie Wilson Award |

== Recordings ==
Farr's debut album, Out of the Shadows, with music direction by Jon Weber, features her interpretations of both classic and contemporary songs. Will Friedwald of The Wall Street Journal noted, "Her voice is bright, strong, and true...she is not afraid of the darker moments," and praised her as "probably the most convincing younger American to sing Noël Coward."

=== Discography ===
1. Out of the Shadows (2012), debut solo album
2. That Star in the Picture: "That Star in the Picture" (2023), James Adler & Albany Records
3. Hidden Treasures by Larry Kerchner: "Somewhere in Time" (2011)

== Jewelry career ==
While developing her performance career, Shana worked at luxury jeweler Harry Winston, where she served as Director of Merchandise and Product Development. Her time there exposed her to the highest levels of jewelry craftsmanship and design. She later became Director of Merchandise at The Aaron Group, a major jewelry manufacturer, where she developed fashion-forward collections for retail giants including Macy's, JCPenney, and Kohl's.

In 2009, while emerging into cabaret and concert work, Shana also launched her own fine jewelry line, Pure Imagination by Shana Farr, merging her artistic background with exquisite craftsmanship. Her collections are known for their whimsical yet classic designs, incorporating gemstones, vintage-inspired motifs, and storytelling elements. Her pieces have been featured in Bridal Guide Magazine, JQ International, and The Examiner.

After becoming a mother, Shana's most personal jewelry venture was launched in 2018, The Baby Promise, a collection of mother's promise rings inspired by the commitments of motherhood.
