= Keith Hill (musical instrument maker) =

Keith Richard Hill (born 8 May 1948) is a prize winning American maker of musical instruments. He has conducted research into the acoustical technology employed by musical instrument makers from 1550–1850, and used this knowledge to create hundreds of harpsichords, clavichords and other instruments.

== Early life and education ==
Hill was born in China to missionary parents, and raised in the Philippines. He moved to the United States permanently in 1962. He attended music school at Michigan State University, studying piano and carillon with Wendell Westcott, organ with Corliss Arnold, and piano tuning and historical temperaments with Owen Jorgensen. He graduated with a Bachelor of Music in music history from Western Michigan University in 1971.

Hill became interested in making harpsichords while a student at Michigan State and built his first instrument there. He worked briefly making harpsichords for Rainer Schutze in Heidelberg, Germany and then for E.O. Witt in Three Rivers, Michigan before studying harpsichord performance with Anneke Uittenbosch at the Sweelinck Conservatory in Amsterdam, the Netherlands. He traveled around Europe making measurements of more than 150 antique harpsichords, fortepianos, clavichords, and virginals.

== Career ==
In 1972 Hill opened a workshop in Grand Rapids, Michigan. Initially working alone, he made on average 12 double-manual harpsichords each year. As interest in his instruments grew, Hill began to work with apprentices, some of whom later went on to become independent builders. These include Bruce Kennedy (began 1980), Philip Tyre (1982), David Jencks (1985), Dietrich Hein (1986), Dale Killewald (1987), Christoph Kern (1988), and Burkhard Zander (1989). Hill and Tyre were business partners in the 1980s and some instruments bear the Hill and Tyre label. During the early and mid-1980s Hill began extensive research into the acoustical technology of musical instrument makers from the Renaissance, Baroque, and Classical periods. Beginning in 1993, harpsichord production was moved to Manchester, Michigan.

In 1980 Hill designed and build a pedal harpsichord; the instrument was shown at the Boston Early Music Festival in the early 1980s. In 2004 he performed an acoustical restoration of the 1658 Girolamo de Zentis harpsichord, originally part of the collection at the New York Metropolitan Museum of Art.

Hill wrote articles about instrument making for Continuo: The Magazine of Old Music,. including "The Anatomy of Authenticity" (1985) and "How to Judge a Harpsichord" (1985). In October 1987 Hill was Continuo's featured artist. Another article was titled "Plastic versus Quill" (Continuo, 1993).

After researching tanning methods and techniques for the making of hammer leather suitable for use on fortepianos, Hill developed a custom hammer leather.

Hill began making violins and studying violin varnish in 1978. After five years of experimentation, he developed a varnish made from wood ashes, water (to convert the ash to lye), linseed oil, and rosin. In 1994 he published his findings in an article in the Guild of American Luthiers Journal (#37) titled: "Ash Violin Varnish." Further research in 2012-13 led Hill to refine the varnish formula currently in use.

Later Hill compiled his knowledge into thirteen acoustical principles, creating a lengthy document, Treatise on the True Art of Making Musical Instruments—a Practical Guide to the Forgotten Craft of Enhancing Sound. This work has been published. It is used as the text for his Acoustical Technology Training program.

Hill has conducted his research in partnership with his wife, Marianne Ploger (Professor of Music Perception and Cognition at Vanderbilt University) and his brother, Robert Hill (Director of the Early Music Program at the Hochschule für Musik Freiburg in Germany). Hill and Ploger jointly re-wrote and revised an earlier article, "On Affect." They have collaborated in presenting a series of workshops on the craft of musical communication at conservatories and schools of music in Europe and the United States.

In 2008 Hill established the Acoustical Technology Trainee program that is specific to the technical craft of enhancing sound, not instrument making, and has now taught keyboard instrument acoustics to a number of professional musicians and luthiers: Maxims Doronins, Artiom Sinelnikov, Ladislav Prokop, Devin Golka, Alexander Shchetnya, Alexander Shipanov, Romano Danesi, Fabio Rigali.

Hill maintains a violin making workshop in Nashville, Tennessee. Keyboard instruments continue to be made in his Tennessee workshop.

== Instruments built ==
Hill's instruments, which are known for their full tone, have been used in performances and recordings by keyboard artists such as Elizabeth Farr (Naxos), Robert Hill (Archive Prod. Hanssler Classics), Mireille Lagace (ATMA, Calliope), Mitzi Meyerson (Dabringhaus & Grimm), Anthony Newman (Vox cum laude), Edward Parmentier (Wildboar), and Andreas Staier] (Archive Prod., Deutsche Harmonia Mundi) and many others.

Hill's production of musical instruments includes, as of 2014, 199 Double-manual Harpsichords (of which 6 are 16’ harpsichords), 143 Violins, 71 Single-manual Harpsichords, 9 Lautenwerks, 49 Clavichords, 39 Violas da Gamba, 22 Spinets, 19 Fortepianos, 11 Pedal Harpsichords, 8 Guitars, 10 Violas, 9 Cellos, and smaller numbers of various other heritage instruments.

== Publications ==
- "The Craft of Musical Communication," Japanese Clavichord Society Journal (1996)
- "Area Tuning the Violin," Guild of American Luthiers Journal
- "Hints to Area Tuning the Violin," Guild of American Luthiers Journal (Vol. 1 #1)
- "The Dynamics of Viol Making," "Early Music" Jan. 1980 (vol. 8, n1), p. 77.
- "Ash Varnish: A Modern Alchemist's Recipe for Violin Varnish with all the Defects of 17th-century Italian Varnish," American Lutherie, (Spring 1994, n37), pp. 44-48.
- "Play from the Soul, an Artist's Science for Creativity," Philagnosis Press (2018)
- "Treatise on the True Art of Making Musical Instruments: A Practical Guide to the Hidden Craft of Enhancing Sound," Philagnosis Press (2018)
