= Fara (surname) =

Fara or Fára is a surname. Notable people with the surname include:

- Aaron Fara, Austrian judoka
- Abdulwahed Mohamed Fara, Yemeni diplomat
- Bundos Fara (born 1965), Filipino metalworker
- Cain Fara (born 1994), Argentine footballer
- Delia Graff Fara (1969–2017), American philosopher
- Eli Fara (born 1967), Albanian singer
- Giovanni Francesco Fara (1543–1591), Sardinian historian, geographer and cleric
- Gita Fara (born 1985), Indonesian film producer and editor
- Gustavo Fara (1859–1936), Italian general and politician
- Libor Fára (1925–1988), Czech sculptor and painter
- Mario Giulio Fara (1880–1949), Italian musicologist and historian of music
- Patricia Fara, British historian of science

== See also ==
- Faria
- Faras (name)
- Farr (surname)
