= Michael K. Farr =

- Born: Michael Keogh Farr; April 24, 1961 (age 65); Washington, D.C., U.S.
- Education: University of The South (BA)
- Occupation: Investment Company Executive
- Years active: May 1996 to present
- Spouse: Laurie Fishburn
- Website: Official website

Michael K. Farr is an American author. He is chief market strategist for Hightower Advisors, LLC as well as president of the DC investment advisory firm, Farr, Miller, & Washington. He has written three books, A Million Is Not Enough: How to Retire With the Money You'll Need, The Arrogance Cycle, and Restoring Our American Dream, which came out in 2013. Farr received a Next Generation Indie Books Finalist Award for Restoring Our American: The Best Investment in the category of Current Events/Social Change.

== Business career ==
Michael K. Farr is chief market strategist for Hightower Advisors, LLC as well as President and CEO of Farr, Miller & Washington, . He is chairman of the Investment Committee and is responsible for overseeing the day-to-day activities of the firm. Prior to starting the firm, he was a principal with Alex. Brown & Sons. He was an advisor to the St. Petersburg and Moscow stock exchanges in the Glasnost Era, and taught capitalism to former communists as the Soviet Union moved towards a market economy.

Farr is also a member of the Economic Club of Washington, the Young President's Organization, and the Washington Association of Money Managers. Farr is chairman of HEROES, Inc., a charity supporting the families of DC area first responders who have given their lives in the line of duty. He is also the Past Chairman of the Sibley Memorial Hospital Foundation and the Washington D.C. Salvation Army.

== Influence in financial media ==
Farr is a paid contributor on CNBC television and was a recurring commentator for The Today Show, Good Morning America, NBC's Nightly News, CNN, Bloomberg, Reuters, and the Nightly Business Report on PBS. He is often heard on Associated Press Radio, CBS Radio and National Public Radio and hosts a weekly podcast The FarrCast. Farr has been quoted in the Wall Street Journal, Forbes, Fortune, The Washington Post, Businessweek, USA Today, and many other publications.

Since 2010 he has appeared alongside various Federal Reserve Bank Presidents at the University of Delaware's Economic Forecast. He also has given presentations at Hebrew University, The World Economic Forum, Drexel University, and appears annually at the YPO Economic Summit.

The forwards of The Arrogance Cycle and A Million Is Not Enough were written by P. J. O'Rourke, the American political satirist, journalist, writer, and author. The forward of Restoring Our American Dream was written by Gen. Brent Scowcroft.

== Publications ==
Title	Type	Publisher	Publication Date
[A Million Is Not Enough: How to Retire With the Money You'll Need	non-fiction	Headline Books	March 5, 2008
The Arrogance Cycle	non-fiction	Lyons Press	September 1, 2011
Restoring Our American Dream: The Best Investment	non-fiction	Springboard Press	March 2013
