= Helen Farr =

British maritime archaeologist

R. Helen Farr FSA
- Born: Rosemary Helen Farr

Academic background
- Education: University of Cambridge; Southampton University

Academic work
- Discipline: Archaeology
- Sub-discipline: Maritime Archaeology, Prehistory
- Institutions: Southampton University

R. Helen Farr FSA is a British maritime archaeologist and prehistorian who specialises in prehistoric submerged landscapes and early seafaring. Farr is a certified (HSE) commercial diver. She is lecturer in the Marine and Maritime Institute in the Department of Archaeology at the Southampton University. Farr was elected as a Fellow of the Society of Antiquaries of London on 17 October 2019.

== Early life and education ==
Prior to attending university, Farr was a water sports instructor, where she developed an interest in maritime related work and completed her professional certifications in diving. She is an HSE commercial diver Farr attended Cambridge University where she studied Archeology and Anthropology and received a BA. She furthered her studies at the Centre for Maritime Archaeology at Southampton University where she obtained an MA in Maritime Archaeology. She completed her PhD at Cambridge University. She was appointed to a post-doctoral position at Cambridge and was awarded a fellowship with the McDonald Institute for Archaeological Research. During this time period, Farr became interested in prehistoric submerged landscapes.

== Career ==
Farr's research centres on the growth of early seafaring and the maritime industry in connection with prehistoric island colonisation. In 2009, she was awarded a three-year Leverhulme fellowship at Southampton University to study prehistoric submerged landscapes of the Solent, the strait between the Isle of Wight and the mainland of England. She was appointed to a lectureship at the Southampton Marine and Maritime Institute at the University of Southampton.

Farr was a member of the Black Sea Maritime Archaeology Project (MAP) team, sponsored by the Southampton's Centre for Maritime Archaeology. The purpose of the five-year project (2014–2019), was to survey submerged ancient landscapes in the Black Sea. The international team of scientists uncovered and analysed more than sixty shipwrecks, including possibly the world's oldest intact shipwreck (c. 400 BC) found in Bulgarian waters at a depth of more than one mile (1,600 m). The seventy-five feet (23 m) ship, most likely ancient Greek in origin, was discovered with its mast, rudders and rowing benches in place.

In 2017, Farr was awarded a European Research Council Horizon grant (2018–2022), Australasian Colonization Research: Origins of Seafaring to Sahul, for a multidisciplinary study on the earliest evidence of seafaring and the colonisation of Australasia. Farr's current research focuses on the continental shelf off northwest Australia.

== Awards and honours ==
- 2009 Leverhulme Early Career Research Fellowship at Southampton University (2009–2012).
- 2019 Society of Antiquaries of London, Elected as Fellow on 17 October 2019.
- 2017 European Research Council (ERC) Horizon 2020 award and research grant (2018–2022).

== Select publications ==
- Farr, R. H., Clapham, A., Reinhardt, E. G., Boyce, J. I., Collins, S., & Robb, J. (2020). Using marine deposits to understand terrestrial human environments: 6000-year old hyperpycnal flash-flood events and their implications. Journal of Archaeological Science: Reports, 30, 1–16. [102176].
- Dickson, T., Farr, R., Sear, D., & Blake, J. 2019. "Uncertainty in marine weather routing". Applied Ocean Research 88, 138–146. doi:10.1016/j.apor.2019.04.008
- Farr, R. 2014. "Neolithic Seafaring in the Adriatic: La navigazione dell'Adriatico nel Neolitico". In P. Pellegatti, & S. Roma (Eds.), Adriatico senza confini: Via di comunicazione e crocevia do popoli nel 6000 a.c..35-43.
- Farr, H. R. 2006. "Seafaring as social action", Journal of Maritime Archaeology 1(1), 85–99. doi:10.1007/s11457-005-9002-7
