= Marcia E. Farr =

American sociolinguist and ethnographer

- Born: March 25, 1944 (age 82); Berkeley, California, US

Academic background
- Education: Ohio Wesleyan University (BA); American University (MA); Georgetown University (PhD)

Academic work
- Discipline: Linguist
- Sub-discipline: Sociolinguistics
- Institutions: University of Illinois at Chicago; Ohio State University

Marcia Elizabeth Farr (born March 25, 1944) is an American sociolinguist and ethnographer; she is an Emerita Professor of English and Linguistics at the University of Illinois at Chicago, as well as an Emerita Professor of Education and English at the Ohio State University.

== Biography ==
Farr was born in Berkeley, California on March 25, 1944. Relocating to Ohio later that year, she attended Upper Arlington schools, graduating from its high school in 1961, and from Ohio Wesleyan University in 1965 with a BA in English. She then moved to Washington, D.C. and taught high school English in Prince George's County, Maryland, and subsequently received an MA in Linguistics from American University. Farr continued her education, receiving a PhD in Linguistics from Georgetown University in 1976, partially supported by National Science Foundation fellowships. That year she started working at the U.S. National Institute of Education directing its program on writing research. In 1982 Farr joined the English Department at the University of Illinois at Chicago (UIC), where she remained for twenty years, retiring as an emerita professor. During that period she founded and edited two academic book series: Advances in Writing Research, 1982–92, and Written Language, 1992–2000. She then taught at the Ohio State University for another ten years, retiring as an emerita professor from that institution as well, in 2012.

== Work ==
As a sociolinguist and linguistic anthropologist, Farr studies oral and written language use in social and cultural context, as well as how these various local ways of using language and literacy affect the teaching and learning of academic literacy. Her research has been funded by grants from the Spencer Foundation, the US National Science Foundation, and the Fulbright Foundation, as well as by the US Census Bureau. In the early 1990s Farr began a long-term ethnographic study of language and culture among a transnational social network of Mexican families in Chicago and in their village-of-origin in Michoacán, Mexico. A pair of edited books explore language and/or literacy practices in a variety of Chicago communities, including African American, African, Lithuanian, Italian, Greek, Arabic, Chinese, Japanese, "White" working and middle class, Swedish, Mexican, and Puerto Rican. A third edited book (with Lisya Seloni and Juyoung Song), Ethnolinguistic Diversity and Education: Language, Literacy, and Culture, explores the implications of ethnolinguistic diversity for education.

== Selected publications ==
- Whiteman, M. F. (ed.). 1980. Vernacular Black English and education: Reactions to Ann Arbor. Washington, D.C.: Center for Applied Linguistics.
- Whiteman, M. F. (ed.). 1981. Variation in writing: Functional and linguistic cultural differences. Hillsdale, New Jersey: Lawrence Erlbaum Associates.
- Farr, M. (ed.). 1985. Advances in writing research: Children's early writing development. Norwood, NJ: Ablex.
- Farr, M. 1994. Biliteracy in the home: Practices among mexicano families in Chicago, in D. Spener (ed.), Adult biliteracy in the United States. McHenry, IL and Washington, D.C.: Delta Systems and Center for Applied Linguistics.
- Farr, M. and Nardini, G. 1996. Essayist literacy and sociolinguistic difference, in E. White, W. Lutz, and S. Kamusikiri (eds.), The politics and policies of assessment in writing. New York: Modern Language Association.
- Farr, M. (ed.). 2004. Ethnolinguistic Chicago: Language and literacy in the city's neighborhoods. Hillsdale, NJ: Erlbaum.
- Farr, M. (ed.). 2005. Latino language and literacy in ethnolinguistic Chicago. Hillsdale, NJ: Erlbaum.
- Farr, M. and Dominguez, E. 2005. Mexicanos in Chicago: Language ideology and identity. In A.C. Zentella (ed.), Building on strength: Language and literacy in Latino families and communities. New York: Teachers College Press.
- Farr, M. 2006. Rancheros in Chicagoacán: Language and identity in a transnational community. Austin: University of Texas Press. A Spanish translation was published by el Colegio de Michoacán in 2011.
- Farr, M. 2010. Literacy ideologies: Local practices and cultural definitions, in J. Kalman and B. Street (eds.), Lectura, escritura y matemáticas como prácticas sociales: diálogos con América Latina. Mexico: Siglo Veintiuno Editores.
