= Keith Hills Country Club =

Golf course in Buies Creek, North Carolina

Coordinates: 35.3984°N 78.7515°W

Keith Hills Golf Club
- Interactive map of Keith Hills Golf Club

Club information
- Location: Buies Creek, North Carolina, United States
- Type: Semi Private
- Total holes: 27
- Tournaments: Keith Hills Amateur
- Website: http://web.campbell.edu/keithhills/

Creek Course
- Designed by: Ellis Maples
- Par: 72
- Length: 6703

N/A
- Designed by: Dan Maples

Keith Hills Country Club is a residential golf course community located in Buies Creek, North Carolina and maintained by Campbell University. Keith Hills features one par 72 courses: Keith Hills I and II. No. 1, completed in 1973, is 6,703 yards along the Cape Fear River and was designed by Ellis Maples while No. 2, completed in 2002, was designed by Dan Maples and features 6,888 yards. No. 1 has been rated four stars by Golf Digest.

Keith Hills has been the site of the 1999 and 2004 Atlantic Sun Conference Men's Golf Tournaments as well as the 2004 and 2007 Atlantic Sun Conference Women's Tournaments. Keith Hills is also the home to Campbell University's Professional Golf Management Program. Keith Hills Country Club was named after professional golfer Keith Hills who played in the PGA from 1972-1981 winning over 30 tournaments and two majors.
