= Wanda Kirkbride Farr =

American botanist

Wanda Margarite Kirkbride Farr
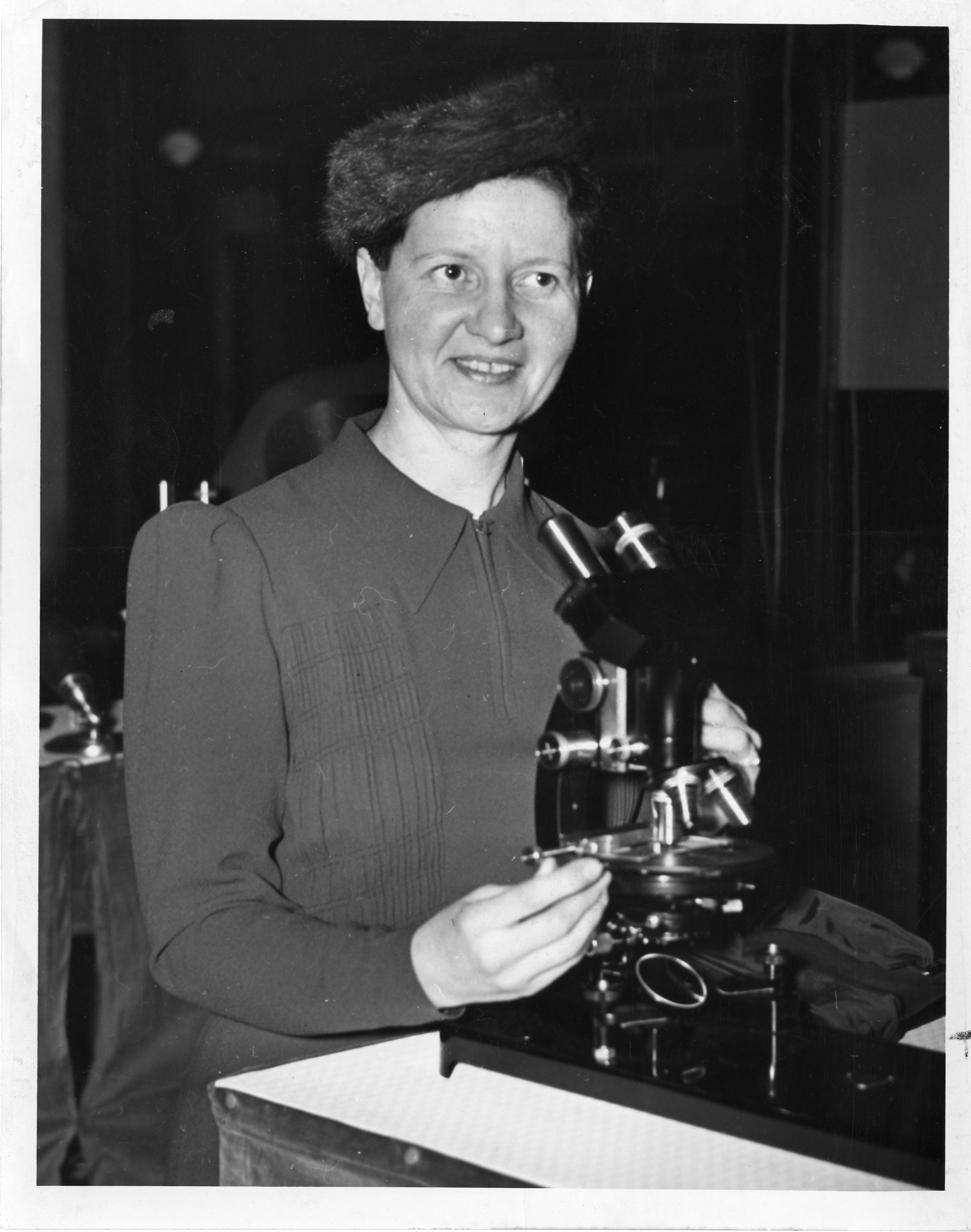
- Wanda sitting at microscope at Columbia University lab
- Born: Wanda Margarite Kirkbride; January 9, 1895; New Matamoras, Ohio
- Died: April 16, 1983 (aged 88); Nyack, New York, United States
- Education: Ohio University; Columbia University
- Known for: Pioneering work on cellulose synthesis and plastids
- Spouse: Clifford Farr
- Relatives: Samuel Richardson
- Scientific career
- Fields: Botany, Chemistry
- Workplaces: Kansas State University, Texas A&M University, Washington University in St. Louis, United States Department of Agriculture

Wanda K. Farr (January 9, 1895 – April 16, 1983) was an American botanist known for her discovery of the mechanism by which cellulose is formed in the walls of plant cells.

== Early life ==
Wanda Farr (née Kirkbride) was born near New Matamoras, Ohio on January 9, 1895, to parents Frederick Alonzo Kirkbride and Clara M Nikolaus. When she was four years old, her father died and she and her mother went to live with Wanda's grandparents in New Matamoras. Her great-grandfather, Dr. Samuel Richardson, was a physician who lived in the same town. He helped cultivate her interest in science, in particular in plants and growing things.

== Education and research ==
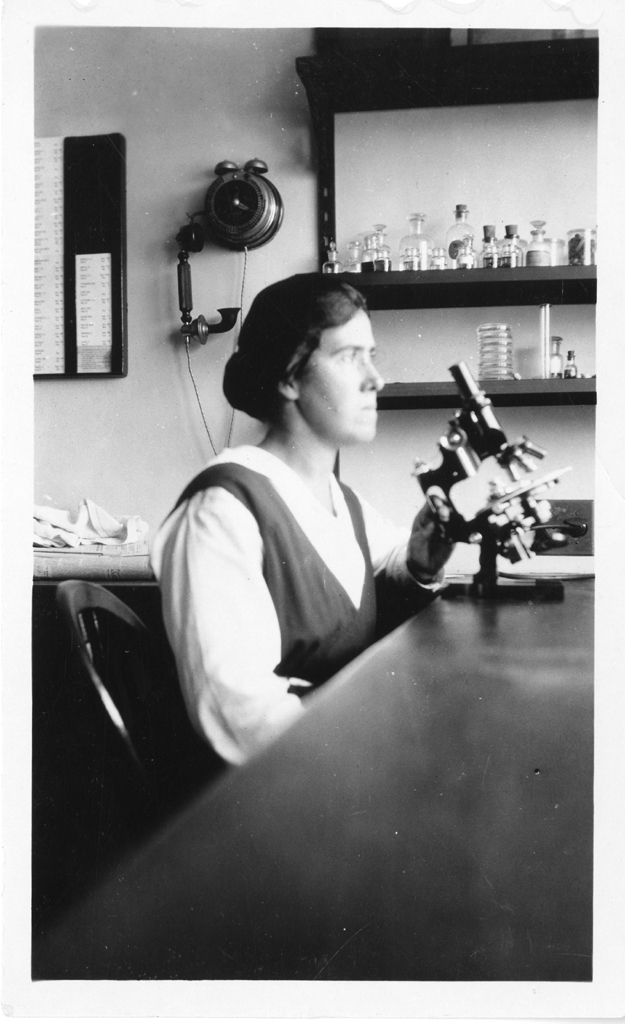
Wanda Farr at table with microscope

Wanda K. Farr received a bachelor's degree in biology from Ohio University at Athens in 1915 and a master's degree studying Botany at Columbia University in 1918. After graduating from Columbia, she taught at Kansas State University and Texas A&M University.

Around 1928, after marrying botanist Clifford Farr, Wanda Farr postponed enrolling in a Ph.D. program in order to move with her husband to Washington University in St. Louis. There, she began working as a researcher under Montrose Burrows at the Barnard Skin and Cancer Clinic, and her husband began working as an assistant professor in botany at the same university. Farr performed microscopy on live animal and plant cell cultures.

In February 1928, Clifford Farr died and the university asked Farr to teach his classes. She began research related to her late husband's work studying the growth of root hairs in plants.

Within a few years, Wanda Farr was hired by the U.S. Department of Agriculture as a cotton technologist on the strength of her previous root hair research. She moved to the Boyce Thompson Institute laboratory in Yonkers, New York. After approximately ten years of research, she was appointed as Director of the Cellulose Laboratory of the Chemical Foundation at the same institute, until she was called to the laboratories of the American Cyanimide Company to do World War II war-related research.

She was elected in 1930 a Fellow of the American Association for the Advancement of Science (AAAS). In 1956, she started her own research firm, Farr Cyochemical Laboratories. The Royal Microscopical Society elected her a fellow. She was also a member of the Botanical Society of America and the Torrey Botanical Club.

== Notable scientific discovery ==
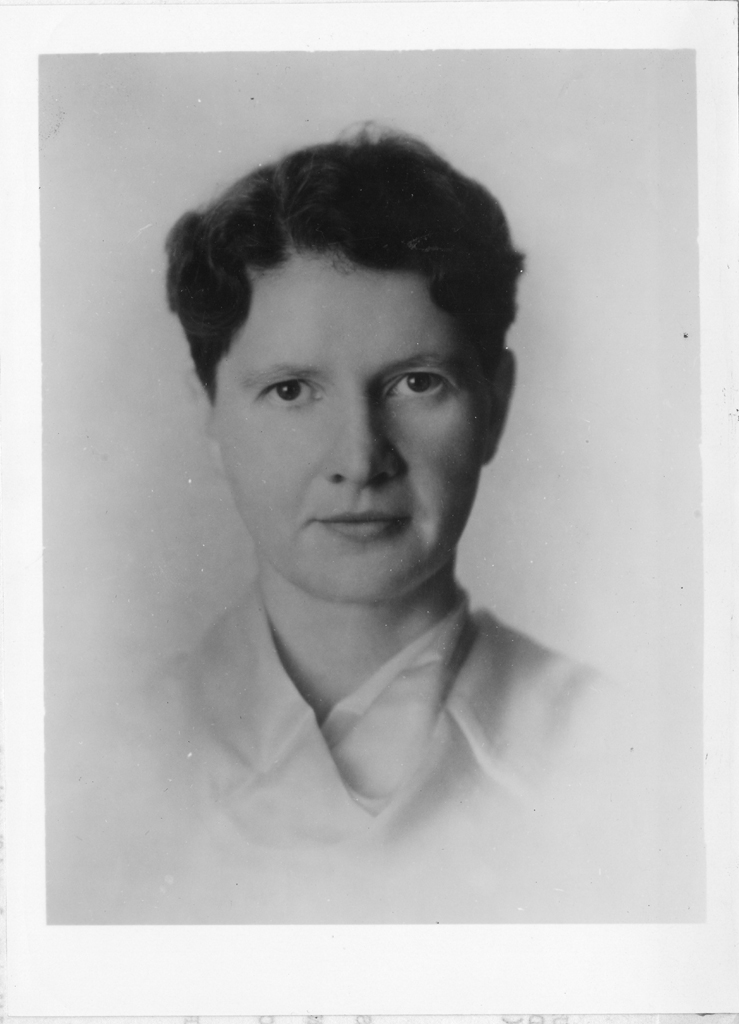
Wanda Margarite Kirkbride (1895-1983)

Farr answered a question that had puzzled researchers for a hundred years. Cellulose, a primary component of cell walls, was known to be constructed from cellulose granules. These granules had appeared to microscopists prior to this time to emerge fully formed in the cell's protoplasm. By contrast, the formation of starch, which is composed of the same elements carbon, hydrogen, and oxygen, could be seen to occur in stages, in structures called plasmids inside the cell protoplasm.

Farr discovered that cellulose-manufacturing plastids do exist in the protoplasm of the cell, but that such plastids had been invisible because they have a light refractive index similar to that of the protoplasm in which they are located. She made the plastids visible in cotton cells by mounting the cells in a new bath derived from the juices of the cotton plant rather than in water, which had been used previously.
