= Fred Farr =

American politician (1910–1997)

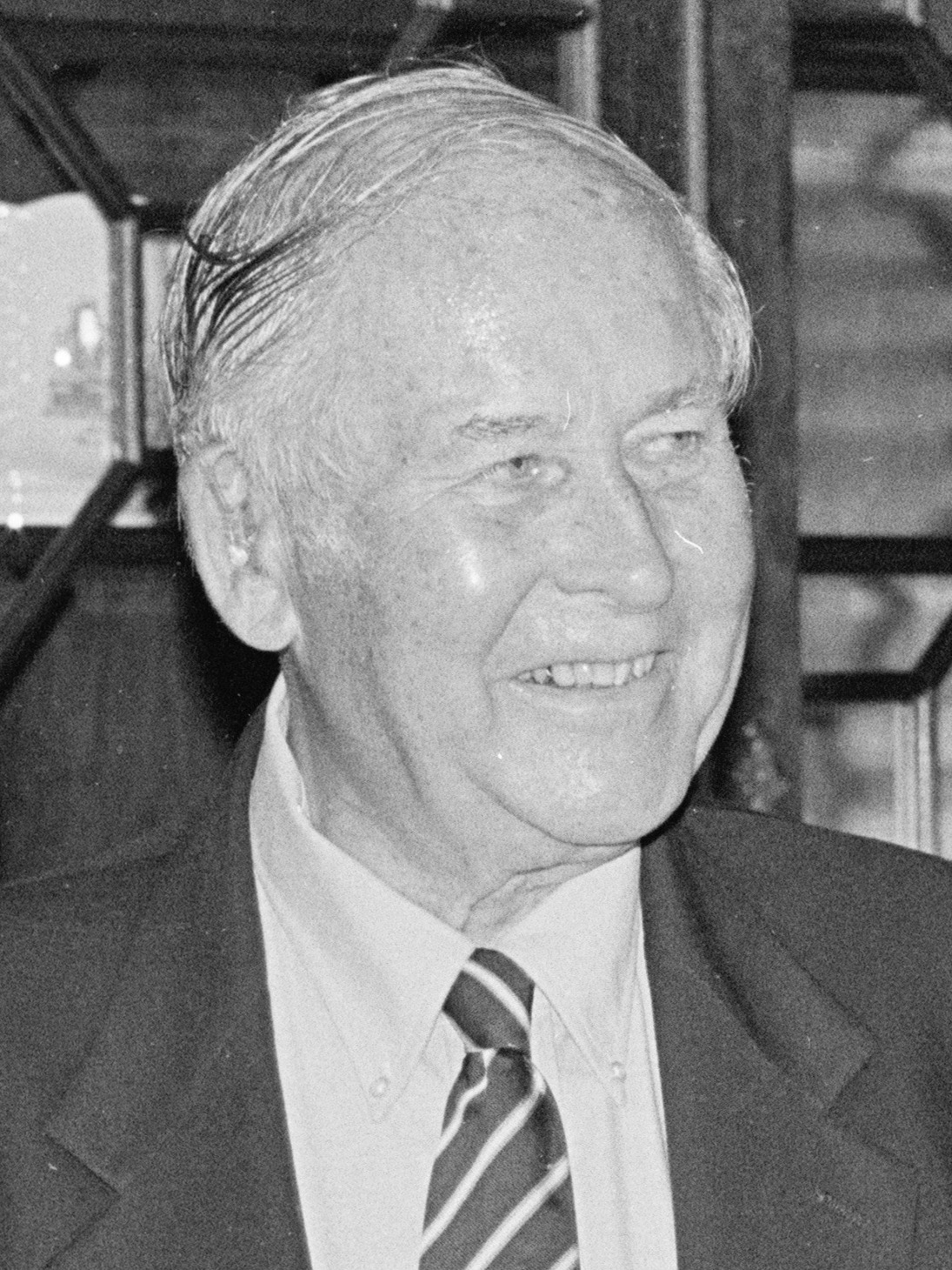
- Farr in 1993

Member of the California State Senate from the 25th district
- In office May 23, 1955 – January 2, 1967
- Preceded by: Frederick Weybret
- Succeeded by: Robert S. Stevens

Personal details
- Born: August 2, 1910 Oakland, California, U.S.
- Died: June 10, 1997 (aged 86) Carmel, California, U.S.
- Party: Democratic
- Spouse: Janet Emerson Haskins (m. 1938; died 1965)
- Children: 3, (including Sam)
- Education: University of California, Berkeley

Frederick Sharon Farr (August 2, 1910 – June 10, 1997) was an American politician who served in the California State Senate for the 25th district from 1955 to 1967. A member of the Democratic Party, he authored the bills SB 118, which established the California Commercial Code, and SD 2007, which authorized California to purchase Asilomar State Beach.

He is the father of Sam Farr, who served as a member of the U.S. House of Representatives from 1993 to 2017.

== Early life and education ==
Farr was born in Oakland, California on August 2, 1910, to Harry St. Laurence Farr and Blanche Virginia Sharon, being raised in the neighboring city of Piedmont with his brother William Sharon Farr. He attended the University of California, Berkeley, studying at the university's School of Law and graduating in 1935. He worked for the Legal Aid Society of San Francisco, then being hired by the United States Maritime Commission during World War II and later working for the Port of New York.

== Political career ==
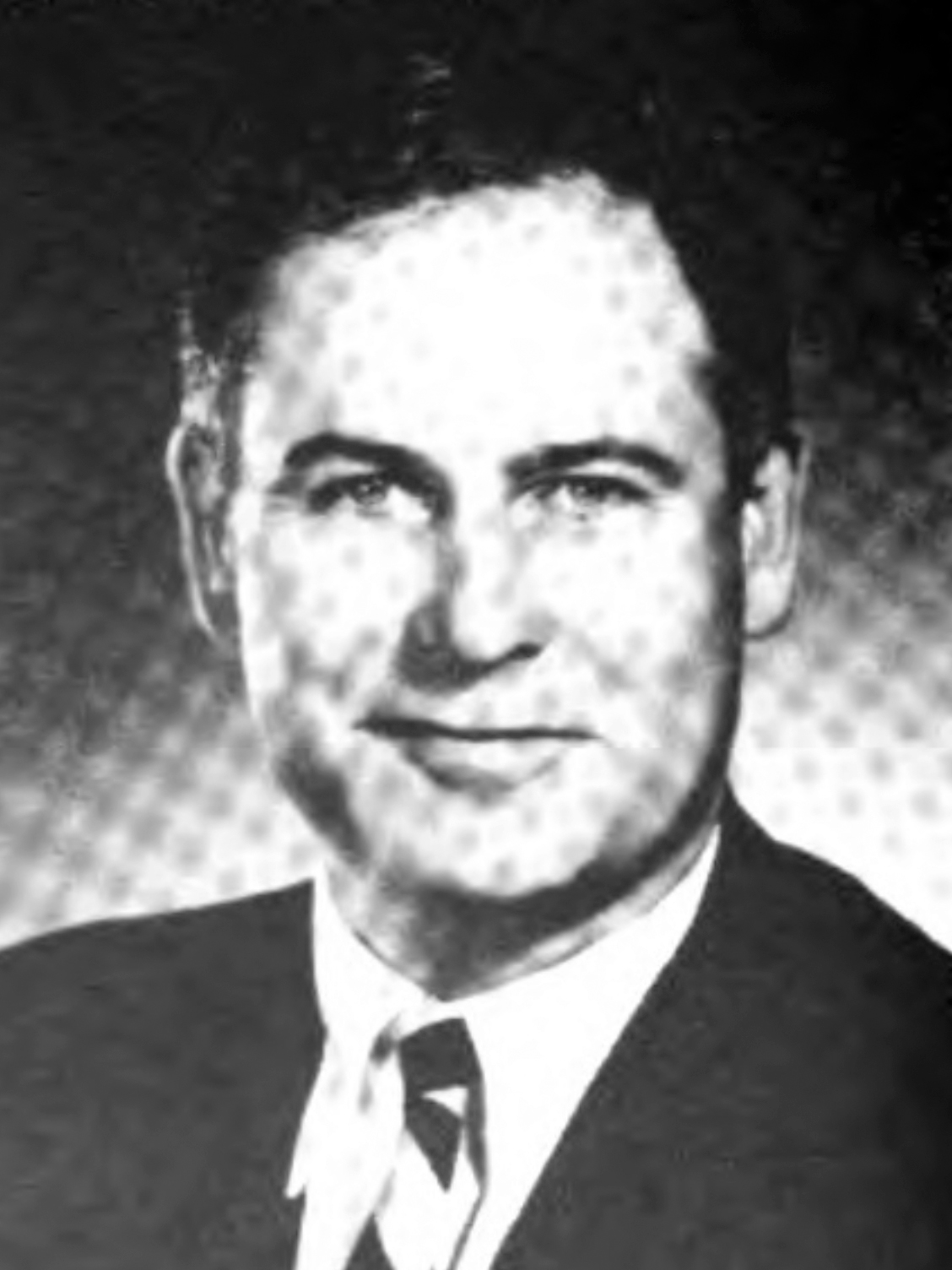
Farr as a member of the State Senate in 1958.

In 1954, Farr ran for State Assembly in the 34th district, but lost to Alan G. Pattee. The next year, he ran for the State Senate in the 25th district, as a special election had been called due to the death of Frederick Weybret. He defeated former Speaker of the Assembly James W. Silliman and became the first Democratic member for the district since 1921.

As a state senator, Farr was known as a conservationist, helping create the scenic highway system and helped create legislation that allowed cities and counties to get conservation easements and helped push legislation that created the Older Americans Act.

In 1966, he was redistricted to the 17th district and ran for re-election, but lost to Donald L. Grunsky. He then ran for State Assembly for the 34th district in 1969 after the death of Pattee, his opponent in the 1954 election, but he lost to Bob Wood.

== Personal life ==
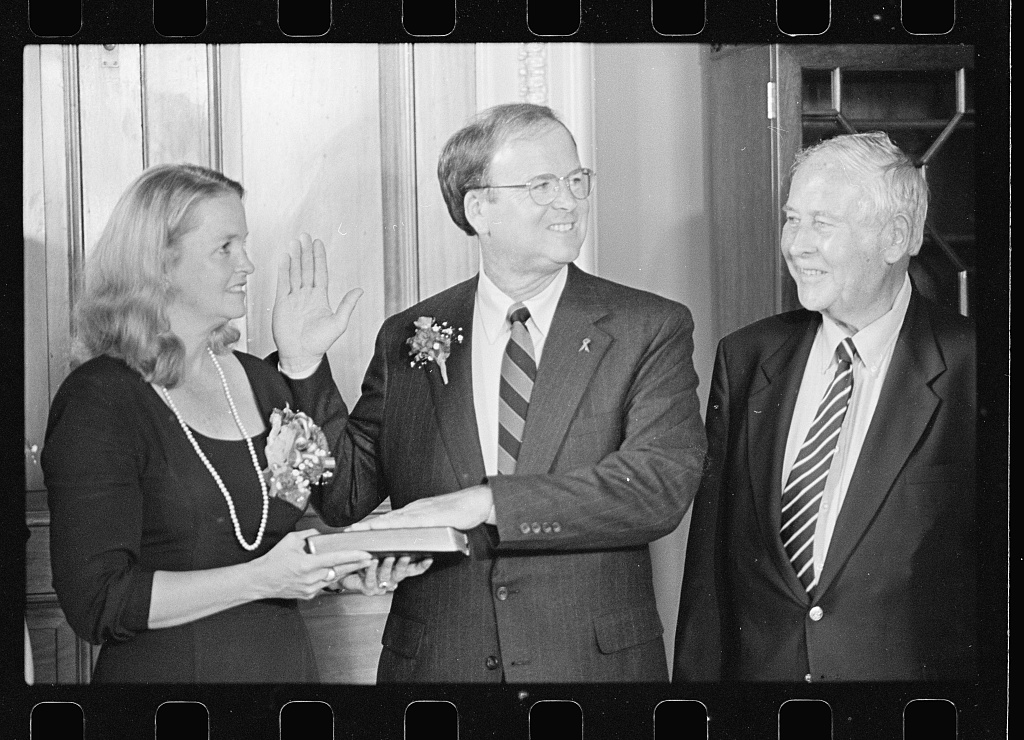
Farr (right) with his son Sam and his wife Shary during Sam's oath of office in 1993.

Farr married Janet Emerson Haskins on May 14, 1938, in Los Angeles, and with her, they had three children: Sam, Francesca, and Nancy. In 1965, Janet died from cancer and in that same year, Nancy died after being thrown from a horse and suffering from blunt head trauma while in Colombia. On June 28, 1970, Francesca married Prescott Sheldon Bush III, a member of the Bush family. In 1992, Sam was elected to the California State Assembly and later elected to the U.S. House of Representatives in 1993.

Farr died on June 10, 1997, in his home in Carmel, California after suffering from a stroke complicated by pneumonia.
