= Junius S. Mobley =

South Carolinian politician (died 1904)

June Mobley
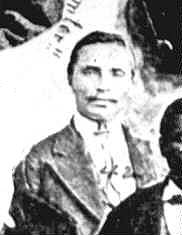

South Carolina House of Representatives
- In office 1868–?

Personal details
- Born: Junius S. Mobley United States
- Died: January 2, 1904
- Party: Republican

Junius S. Mobley (died January 2, 1904), also known as June Mobley, was a politician in South Carolina. He was considered an ultra-radical, and was one of South Carolina's 1868 Radical Republican members of the Legislature. He reportedly became a preacher after the Reconstruction era. Mobley was a political leader during the Reconstruction era in South Carolina and was involved in the distribution of ammunition to freedmen. He was part of the Union Brotherhood that replaced the Union League in 1872. Mobley was from Union County, South Carolina. John Schreiner Reynolds wrote about Mobley and other African American legislators in 1905. He was not a fan of Mobley's, and described him as "mulatto" and said he gave incendiary speeches causing bloodshed for the "men of his own race". He also referred to Mobley as a "vicious and mouthy Negro".

== See also ==
- Joseph Crews
