= James Adler =

American composer and pianist

James Adler (born November 19, 1950, in Chicago, Illinois) is an American composer and pianist. Adler began his piano studies at age 10 with Elsie K. Brett. His teachers include Rose Willits, Mollie Margolies and Seymour Lipkin. He has coached with Rudolph Ganz, Ivan Moravec, Olga Barabini and Konrad Wolff.

In 1967, Adler won the Chicago Symphony Orchestra (CSO) Youth Auditions and made his debut with the orchestra in January 1968. Subsequently, he attended the Curtis Institute of Music, receiving a Bachelor's Degree in piano performance in 1973 and a Master's Degree in composition in 1976, studying with Myron Fink. He has appeared in recital on the CSO's Allied Arts Piano Series and performed in venues ranging from Alice Tully Hall and New York's Paramount Theatre at Madison Square Garden to London's Wigmore Hall and Royal Albert Hall to the Dimitria Festival in Thessaloniki, Greece. In 1996, his composition, Memento mori - An AIDS Requiem, was premiered in Atlanta, Georgia, and was released on CD in 2001.

According to the Chicago Sun-Times, Adler is a pianist who "can create whatever type of music he wants at the keyboard". He has received grants from Meet The Composer and from the New Jersey State Council on the Arts, and he is listed in Who's Who in American Music and the International Who's Who in Music.

Adler currently lives in New York City and has been a member of the Department of Fine Arts faculty at Saint Peter's University in Jersey City, New Jersey, since 1987.

== Discography ==
- 2001: Memento mori - An AIDS Requiem - Albany Records; performed by Amor Artis Chorale and Orchestra
- 2007: Light and Sirius - Capstone Records; solo piano pieces performed by Nicholas Underhill
- 2009: Reflections upon a September Morn - Albany Records digital download
- 2008: James Adler Plays Syncopated Rhythms - Albany Records
- 2011: Sculpting the Air - Navona Records
- 2013: James Adler & Friends - Ravello Records
- 2014: Introspections - Albany Records
- 2018: A Winter Triptych - Albany Records; performed by the Judson Memorial Church Choir, New York
- 2019: Homages & Remembrances - Albany Records
- 2023: That Star in the Picture - Albany Records
