= Dorathy Farr =

American painter

- Born: 1910; St. Louis, Missouri, United States
- Died: August 21, 1989
- Education: The New School
- Known for: Painting
- Spouse: Fred Farr

Dorathy Farr (1910 – August 21, 1989) was an American artist.

Farr was born in St. Louis, Missouri in 1910.

She attended The New School. Farr and her husband, Fred Farr (1914-1973), painted 24 murals at the Wilbur J. Cohen Federal Building in Washington, D.C. as part of the Works Progress Administration.

== Notable collections ==
- 24 murals at the Wilbur J. Cohen Federal Building, 1942, casein and oil on linoleum, Smithsonian American Art Museum, Washington, D.C.
