= Samuel Farr (physician) =

English physician

Samuel Farr, M.D. (1741 – 11 March 1795) was an English physician.

== Life ==
Farr was born at Taunton, Somerset, in 1741. His parents were Protestant Dissenters. His father, whose name is tentatively identified as Thomas Farr, was a merchant and alderman at Bristol; his family was involved in the Atlantic slave trade.

Farr was educated at Bristol Grammar School. A close friend of Thomas Percival, he attended Warrington Academy with him (class of 1758). He then studied at the University of Edinburgh, and finally at Leyden University with Percival, where he took the degree of MD (1765). He was a physician to the Bristol Infirmary from 1767 to 1780, and practised for some years in Bristol. He was elected a Fellow of the Royal Society in 1779 (although his election may have been subsequently voided for non-appearance).

Returning to Taunton, Farr acquired an extensive practice there. He died at Upcott, near Taunton, in the house of John Fisher, on 11 March 1795.

== Works ==
Farr's published works are:

- An Essay on the Medical Virtues of Acids, 1769.
- A Philosophical Inquiry into the Nature, Origin, and Extent of Animal Motion, deduced from the principles of reason and analogy, 1771.
- Aphorismi de Marasmo ex summis Medicis collecti, 1772.
- Inquiry into the Propriety of Blood-letting in Consumption, 1775; against the practice.
- The History of Epidemics, by Hippocrates, in seven books; translated into English from the Greek, with Notes and Observations.
- A Preliminary Discourse on the Nature and Cure of Infection, London, 1781.
- Elements of Medical Jurisprudence, 1788; 2nd edit. 1811; a translation from the work of Johann Friedrich Faselius, with additions by the translator.
- On the Use of Cantharides in Dropsical Complaints (Memoirs Med. ii. 132, 1789).
