= Sam Farr =

American politician (born 1941)

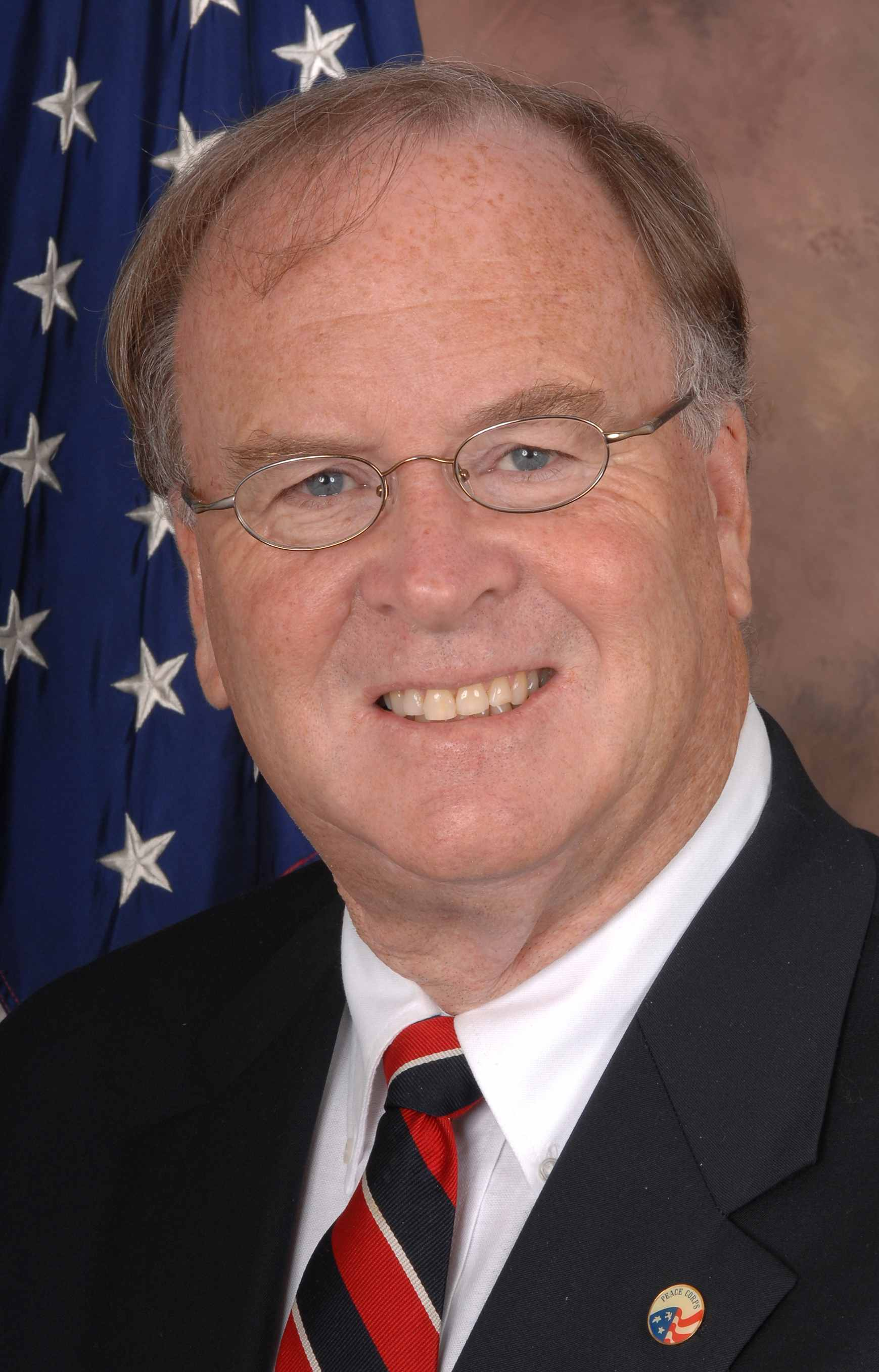
- Official portrait, 2007

Member of the U.S. House of Representatives from California
- In office June 8, 1993 – January 3, 2017 (Note: Farr's official service begins on the date of the special election, while he was not sworn in until June 16, 1993.)
- Preceded by: Leon Panetta
- Succeeded by: Jimmy Panetta
- Constituency: 17th district (1993–2013); 20th district (2013–2017)

Member of the California Assembly
- In office December 7, 1992 – June 14, 1993
- Preceded by: Sal Cannella
- Succeeded by: Bruce McPherson
- Constituency: 27th district
- In office December 1, 1980 – November 30, 1992
- Preceded by: Henry J. Mello
- Succeeded by: Rusty Areias
- Constituency: 28th district

Personal details
- Born: Samuel Sharon Farr; July 4, 1941 (age 85) San Francisco, California, U.S.
- Party: Democratic
- Spouse: Shary Baldwin
- Children: 1
- Relatives: Fred Farr (father)
- Education: Willamette University (BS); Santa Clara University; Monterey Institute of International Studies
- Farr's voice Farr honoring retiring members of California's House delegation. Recorded December 12, 2012

Samuel Sharon Farr (born July 4, 1941) is an American politician who was the U.S. representative for California's 17th (1993–2013) and 20th congressional districts (2013–17). He is a member of the Democratic Party. He was elected to Congress in a 1993 special election when longtime Democratic Rep. Leon Panetta resigned to become Director of the Office of Management and Budget. He retired from Congress following the 2016 elections.

== Early life and education ==
Farr was born in San Francisco, the son of Janet Emerson (née Haskins) and Frederick Sharon "Fred" Farr. He grew up in Carmel, where he still lives. His father was a California state senator from 1955 to 1967.

He was educated at Willamette University, Santa Clara University and the Monterey Institute of International Studies. Farr is a member of the Sigma Chi fraternity at Willamette University.

== Early career ==
=== Peace Corps service ===
Farr joined the Peace Corps in 1964 and served for two years as a volunteer in Colombia. He spent his time in a poor barrio near Medellín, teaching community development skills.

While Farr was serving in Colombia, his mother died from cancer. Following her death, his father visited with Farr's sisters. While riding horses, his sister Nancy was thrown and hit her head. She died on the operating table in a Colombian hospital.

Since his Peace Corps service ended, Farr has visited Colombia often. He went there for his honeymoon and has returned several other times for both personal and official business. During a trip in 2007, Farr spoke before the Colombian Congress and was awarded the Orden del Congreso de Colombia.

=== State and local political career ===
Farr's public service career began in the California State Assembly, where he worked as a staffer on budget issues for a decade. In 1975, he ran for and won a seat on the Monterey County Board of Supervisors.

In 1980, he was elected to a seat in the Assembly, where he became a champion for the organics industry and wrote one of the country's strictest oil-spill liability laws. He served in the Assembly until his election to Congress in 1993.

== U.S. House of Representatives ==
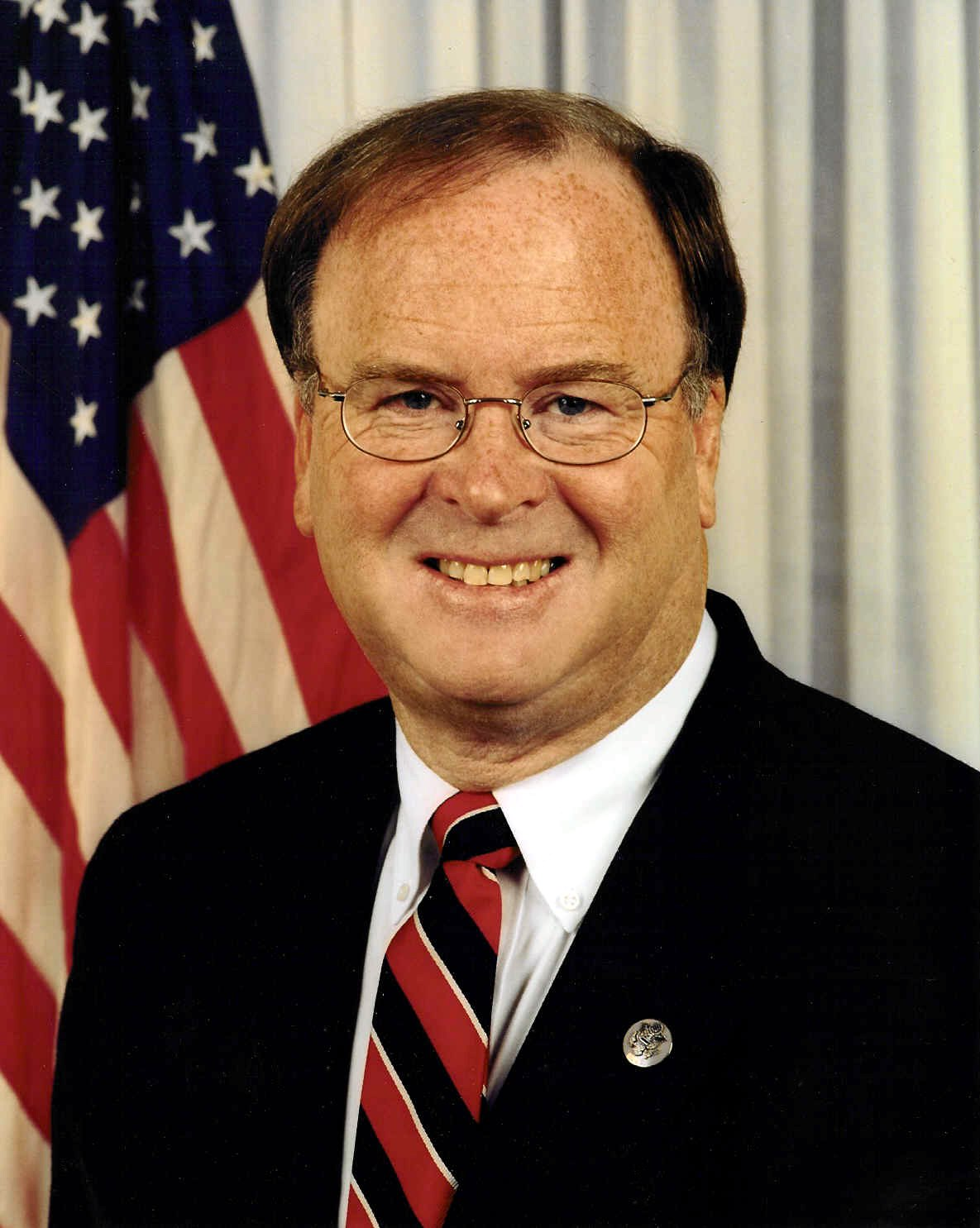
Earlier photo of Congressman Farr

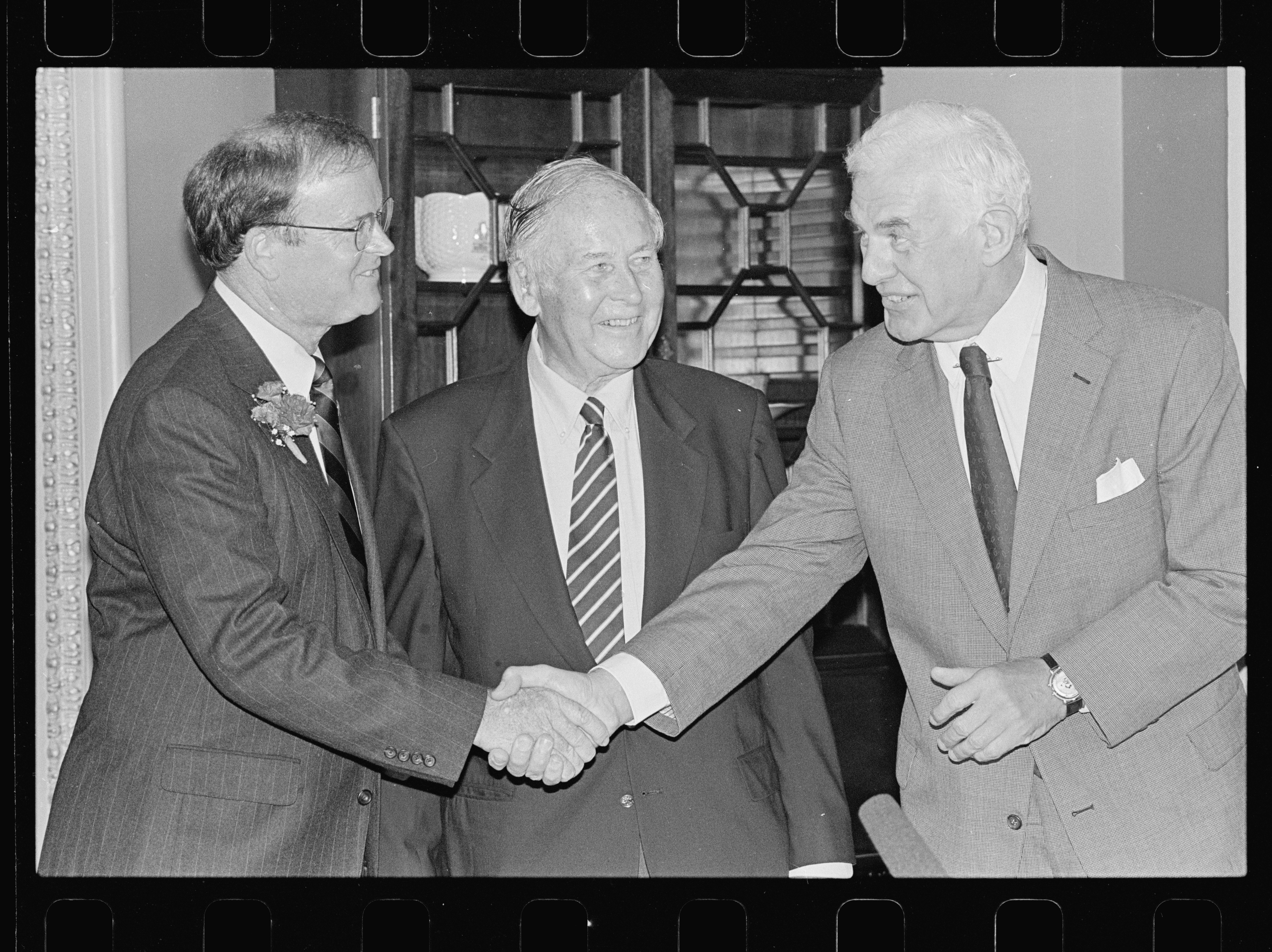
Representative Farr shaking hands with Speaker of the House Tom Foley during his swearing in ceremony

Farr was elected to the House of Representatives in a 1993 special election. He succeeded Leon Panetta, who resigned to become President Bill Clinton's budget director. Farr defeated Republican Bill McCampbell with 52 percent of the vote, and then was elected to his first full term in 1994, defeating McCampbell again with 52 percent of the vote. Both contests were the closest in the district since Panetta claimed the seat for the Democrats in 1977, and to date are the only times since then that a Republican has crossed the 40 percent mark. The district quickly reverted to form, and Farr was re-elected ten more times with no substantive opposition, never dropping below 64 percent of the vote.

=== Legislation ===
- Farr introduced the "Oceans Conservation, Education, and National Strategy for the 21st Century Act" (H.R. 21) in January 2007. The bill would consolidate national management of oceans, creating a system of regional governance; make the National Oceanic and Atmospheric Administration the chief oceans agency; create an ocean advisor in the president's Cabinet; create regional and national ocean advisory committees; and create an Oceans and Great Lakes Conservation Trust Fund. It received a subcommittee markup in April 2008 and passed by a vote of 11–3.
- Farr's "Reconstruction and Stabilization Civilian Management Act of 2008" (H.R. 1084) was approved by the House but stalled in the Senate. The bill would create capacity within the State Department to quickly deploy civilian expertise and coordinate the government response to crises abroad. President [George W. Bush] supported the program and approved initial creation of the group. Farr participated in a rollout of the group with Secretary of State Condoleezza Rice in July 2008.

=== Caucus work ===
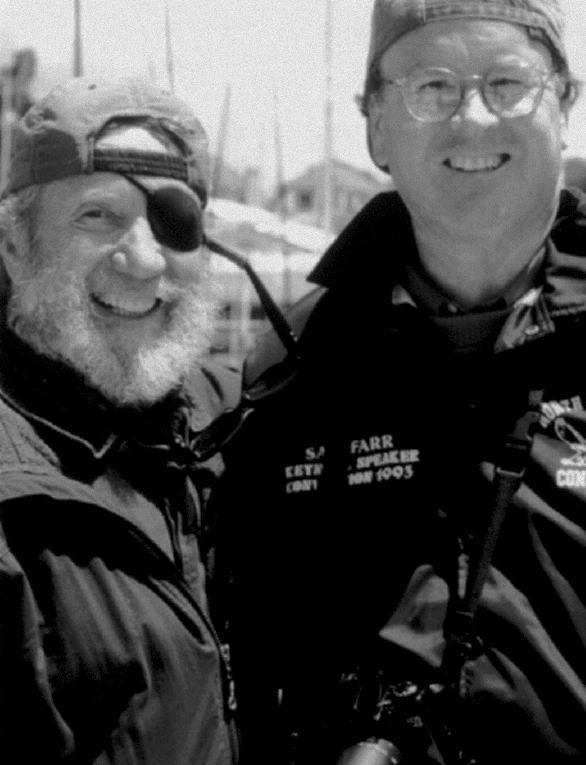
Sam Farr meets with Jack O'Neill

Farr was active in several congressional caucuses, including the House Oceans Caucus, the Congressional Travel and Tourism Caucus, the Congressional Bike Caucus, the Congressional Organic Caucus, the International Conservation Caucus, and the Unexploded Ordnance Caucus.

He served as co-chair of the Congressional Travel and Tourism Caucus with Rep. Gus Bilirakis (R-Florida). Farr actively supported the travel industry, boosting membership in the caucus to more than 100 and hosting caucus events, including a June 2008 gathering of travel executives and congressional leaders--The Economic Roundtable: Travel's Significance to the U.S. Economy.

Farr also was active as co-chair of the House Oceans Caucus, which he co-chaired with four other members. Each year the caucus helps sponsor Capitol Hill Oceans Week, known as CHOW, which draws hundreds of ocean experts from across the country. Farr also co-chaired the Congressional Organic Caucus and the Unexploded Ordnance Caucus.

=== Other leadership positions ===
Farr served on the House Democracy Assistance Commission, a group established by the House and mandated to work with emerging democracies throughout the world. The group engages in "peer-to-peer cooperation to build technical expertise in partner legislatures that will enhance accountability, transparency, legislative independence, access to information, and government oversight."

He also is the former chairman of the California Democratic congressional delegation, the largest state delegation in Congress.

=== Committee assignments ===
- Committee on Appropriations
  - Subcommittee on Agriculture, Rural Development, Food and Drug Administration, and Related Agencies (Ranking Member)
  - Subcommittee on Military Construction, Veterans Affairs, and Related Agencies

== Political positions ==
- Farr was one of 31 House members who voted to not count the electoral votes from Ohio in the 2004 presidential election.
- He opposed the USA PATRIOT Act and is pro-choice. He received a 91% progressive rating by Progressive Punch, ranking him the 42nd most progressive member of congress.
- Farr took a leadership role for the House Democrats in opposing the Central American Free Trade Agreement because he did not think it had good environmental and worker protections.
- He voted against the invasion of Iraq and was actively against the Iraq War.
- Farr voted for the $700 billion Emergency Economic Stabilization Act of 2008.
- He received a perfect 100% rating for the 110th, 111th, and 112th United States Congresses from the Human Rights Campaign.

=== Domestic issues ===
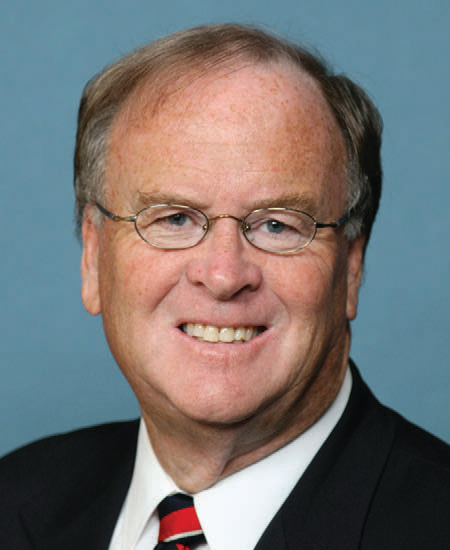
Farr during the 111th Congress

- Farr is a proponent of ocean protection and conservation. In addition to H.R. 21, Farr introduced the Southern Sea Otter Recovery and Research Act (H.R. 3639) and the Clean Cruise Ship Act (H.R. 6434).
- He opposes opening new areas to offshore drilling, instead supporting the drilling of 68,000,000 acres (280,000 km^{2}) of federally owned land already under lease, including 33,000,000 acres (130,000 km^{2}) on the Outer Continental Shelf. Farr also supports ending subsidies to oil companies.
- Farr has worked closely with Central Coast cities and the Army on the re-use of the former Fort Ord. He was integral in securing $29 million for the creation of California State University, Monterey Bay. He also played a role in making sure land on the former installation included significant amounts of affordable housing.
- He supports comprehensive immigration reform that includes a guest worker program for farm workers, allowing undocumented students to remain in the country (known as the DREAM Act), and deporting undocumented felons in U.S. jails.

=== Foreign Affairs ===
- Farr consistently opposed the war in Iraq. He voted against the "Authorization for Use of Military Force Against Iraq Resolution of 2002" that started the war. Farr cosponsored several bills including H.Res. 1329, which supported a timetable for troop withdrawal, and H.R. 5626 and H.R 4959, which called for congressional approval for any long-term agreements with Iraq.
- He was vocal in efforts to prevent military action against Iran, cosponsoring H. Con. Res 33, which would require congressional approval before any incursion into Iran, and H.R. 3119, a bill to prohibit the use of funds for military operations in Iran.
- Farr parlayed his experience in Colombia to become a congressional leader on Colombian affairs. He was an active supporter of rebalancing funds dedicated to Plan Colombia, the U.S. anti-drug effort, to include more support for economic redevelopment efforts. He hosted a wide range of Colombian political leaders in his Washington office including then-President Álvaro Uribe and former President Andrés Pastrana.

=== Immigration and Customs Enforcement (ICE) comment ===
During a 2008 House Homeland Security Appropriations Subcommittee hearing, Farr said "the public image of (the ICE agents)" has become "not (a) compassionate law enforcement agency but essentially a Gestapo-type agency that is knocking down doors" when conducting raids on illegal immigrants. Julie Myers, assistant secretary of Homeland Security for Immigration and Customs Enforcement, responded to Farr's comments by saying, "We are not the Gestapo. The men and women of this agency have a very difficult job...and I think they do that with distinction and great honor.". Farr replied that he knew and appreciated this, but reiterated that there is "there is a very ill will public opinion in the counties (he) represent(s), about ICE".

=== H.Res. 333 ===
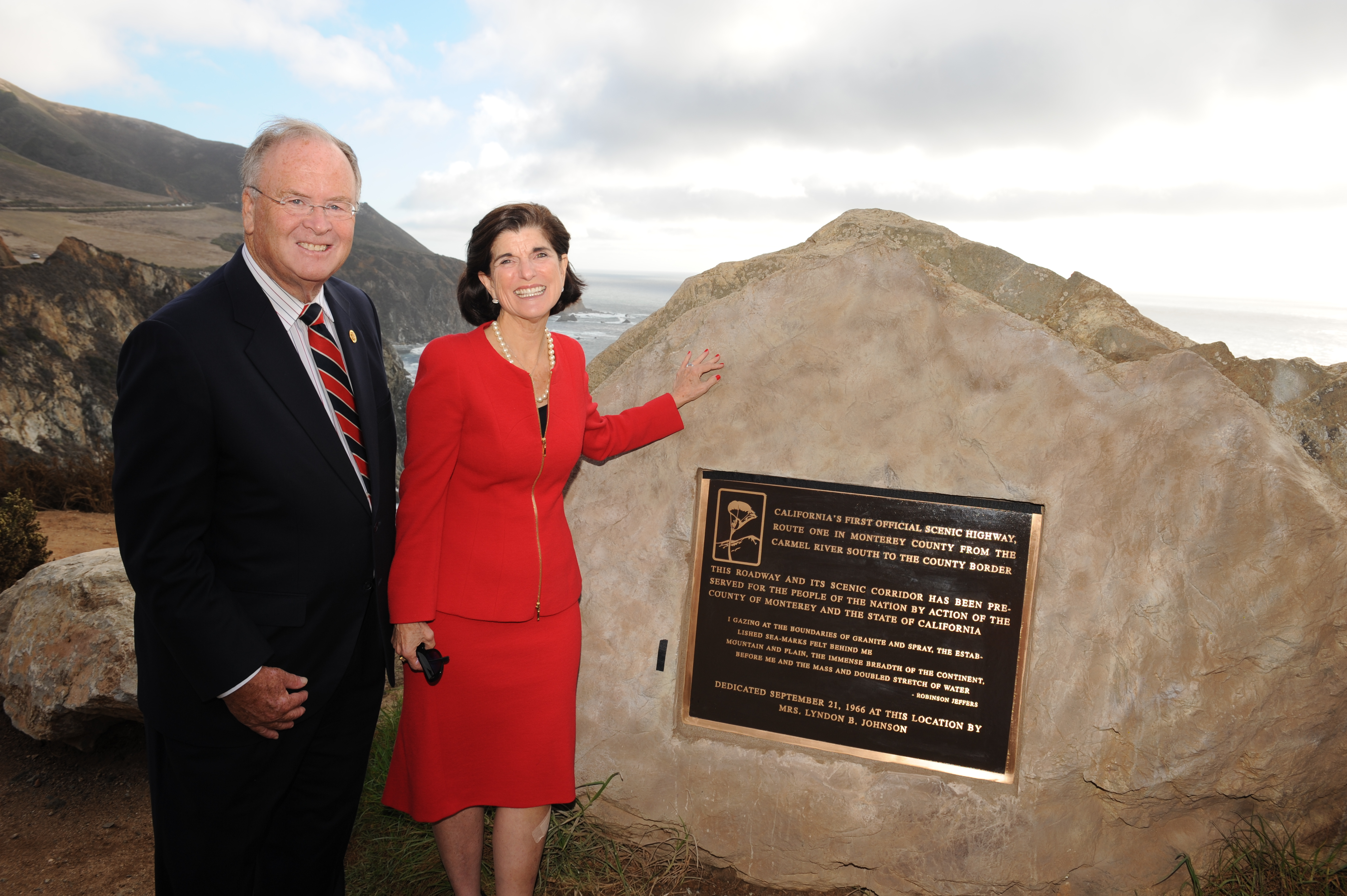
(L-R) Congressman Farr and Luci Baines Johnson at the Bixby Creek Bridge in 2015

On July 12, 2007, Farr joined 11 cosponsors of H.Res. 333, which laid out three articles of impeachment against Vice President Dick Cheney. The bill maintained that the vice president purposely manipulated the intelligence process to deceive the citizens and Congress of the United States (1) by fabricating a threat of Iraqi weapons of mass destruction and (2) about an alleged relationship between Iraq and Al-Qaeda in order to justify the use of the United States Armed Forces against the nation of Iraq in a manner damaging to our national security interests, and (3) that Cheney had openly threatened aggression against the Republic of Iran absent any real threat to the United States.

"Many residents in the Central Coast support the removal of Cheney from office, and I am proud to represent their values in Congress," Farr said in a brief statement.

== Awards ==
On July 30, 2007, Farr received the Senator David Pryor Special Achievement Award for his ongoing advocacy for communities with military bases presented by the Association of Defense Communities. The award is given to an individual who advocates for communities with active or closed military bases. "Communities with active or closed military bases face many special concerns, from land use to economic development to ordnance disposal," said Farr. "I have been lucky enough to assist in the transition efforts at Fort Ord, and that experience has helped me push those issues locally and nationwide." As vice-chair of the House Appropriations Subcommittee on Military Construction, Farr successfully increased clean-up funds from $221 million to $271 million for military bases closed prior to 2005.

== Personal life ==
Farr is married to the former Shary Baldwin and has one daughter, Jessica. He is an Episcopalian.

== Electoral history ==
California State Assembly District 28 election, 1980
Party	Candidate	Votes	%
Democratic	Sam Farr	67,770	53.3
Republican	Ann Welchner	48,001	37.7
Peace and Freedom	Michael G. Zaharakis	6,294	5.0
Libertarian	Donald E. Atkinson	5,073	4.0
Total votes		127,138	100
Turnout			
Democratic hold			

California State Assembly District 28 election, 1982
Party	Candidate	Votes	%
Democratic	Sam Farr (incumbent)	78,534	71.1
Republican	Peter Cost	31,973	28.9
Total votes		110,507	100
Turnout			
Democratic hold			

California State Assembly District 28 election, 1984
Party	Candidate	Votes	%
Democratic	Sam Farr (incumbent)	94,612	72.9
Republican	Lester Rate	35,235	27.1
Total votes		129,847	100
Turnout			
Democratic hold			

California State Assembly District 28 election, 1986
Party	Candidate	Votes	%
Democratic	Sam Farr (incumbent)	75,112	72.1
Republican	Jeff Bosshard	29,025	27.9
Total votes		104,137	100
Turnout			
Democratic hold			

California State Assembly District 28 election, 1988
Party	Candidate	Votes	%
Democratic	Sam Farr (incumbent)	102,654	70.8
Republican	James L. Skillicorn	42,283	29.2
Total votes		144,937	100
Turnout			
Democratic hold			

California State Assembly District 28 election, 1990
Party	Candidate	Votes	%
Democratic	Sam Farr (incumbent)	80,558	71.5
Republican	West W. Walker	32,097	28.5
Total votes		112,655	100
Turnout			
Democratic hold			

California State Assembly District 27 election, 1992
Party	Candidate	Votes	%
Democratic	Sam Farr	101,695	60.7
Republican	Susan Whitman	58,873	35.1
Peace and Freedom	David Lucier	7,050	4.2
Total votes		167,618	100
Turnout			
Democratic gain from Republican			

17th Congressional District of California Special election (round 1), April 13, 1993
Party	Candidate	Votes	%
Democratic	Sam Farr	23,600	25.8
Democratic	William W. Monning	17,050	18.6
Democratic	Barbara Shipnuck	12,982	14.2
Republican	Bill McCampbell	10,911	11.9
Republican	Jess Brown	9,360	10.2
Republican	Bob Ernst	5,126	5.6
Democratic	Martin Vonnegut	2,985	3.3
Republican	Barbara Honegger	1,855	2.0
Democratic	Lancelot C. McClair	1,413	1.5
Republican	John J. Shaw	927	1.0
Republican	Carl Cieslinkowski	696	0.8
Republican	Stephen Henderson	668	0.7
Republican	Tom Shannon	656	0.7
Libertarian	Richard J. Quigley	411	0.5
Democratic	Shelley Reinisch	411	0.5
Democratic	Kyle Samuels	394	0.4
Republican	Darrin Smolinski	361	0.4
Green	Kevin Gary Clark	323	0.4
Republican	Louis Darrigo	318	0.3
American Independent	Jerome N. "Jerry" McCready	293	0.3
Democratic	Ed Frey	257	0.3
Independent	Peter James	164	0.2
Independent	James Ogle	120	0.1
Democratic	Richard H. Kraus	101	0.1
Democratic	Art Dunn	100	0.1
Democratic	Jack Mitchener	85	0.1
Independent	W. Gene Humphrey (write-in)	3	0.0
Total votes		91,570	100.00
Turnout			

17th Congressional District of California Special election (round 2), June 8, 1993
Party	Candidate	Votes	%
Democratic	Sam Farr	53,675	52.3
Republican	Bill McCampbell	43,774	42.6
American Independent	Jerome N. "Jerry" McCready	1,689	1.7
Green	Kevin Gary Clark	1,226	1.2
Libertarian	Richard J. Quigley	948	0.9
Independent	Peter James	943	0.9
Independent	James Ogle	444	0.4
Independent	Tom Shannon (write-in)	33	0.0
Total votes		102,732	100.00
Turnout			
Democratic hold			

United States House of Representatives elections, 1994
Party	Candidate	Votes	%
Democratic	Sam Farr (incumbent)	87,222	52.2
Republican	Bill McCampbell	74,380	44.5
Green	E. Craig Coffin	5,591	3.3
Total votes		167,193	100
Turnout			
Democratic gain from Republican			

United States House of Representatives elections, 1996
Party	Candidate	Votes	%
Democratic	Sam Farr (incumbent)	115,116	58.9
Republican	Jess Brown	73,856	37.8
Natural Law	John Black	6,573	3.3
Total votes		195,545	100.0
Turnout			
Democratic hold			

United States House of Representatives elections, 1998
Party	Candidate	Votes	%
Democratic	Sam Farr (incumbent)	103,719	64.5
Republican	Bill McCampbell	52,470	32.7
Libertarian	Rick Garrett	2,791	1.7
Natural Law	Scott R. Hartley	1,710	1.1
Total votes		160,690	100.0
Turnout			
Democratic hold			

United States House of Representatives elections, 2000
Party	Candidate	Votes	%
Democratic	Sam Farr (incumbent)	143,219	68.7
Republican	Clint Engler	51,557	24.7
Green	E. Craig Coffin	8,215	4.0
Libertarian	Rick S. Garrett	2,510	1.2
Reform	Larry Fenton	2,263	1.0
Natural Law	Scott R. Hartley	996	0.4
Total votes		208,760	100.0
Turnout			
Democratic hold			

United States House of Representatives elections, 2002
Party	Candidate	Votes	%
Democratic	Sam Farr (incumbent)	101,632	68.1
Republican	Clint Engler	40,334	27.1
Green	Ray Glock-Grueneich	4,885	3.2
Libertarian	Jascha Lee	2,418	1.6
independent (politician)	Alan Shugart (write-in)	27	0.0
Turnout		149,296	
Democratic hold			

United States House of Representatives elections, 2004
Party	Candidate	Votes	%
Democratic	Sam Farr (incumbent)	148,958	66.8
Republican	Mark Risley	65,117	29.2
Green	Ray Glock-Grueneich	3,645	1.7
Peace and Freedom	Joe Williams	2,823	1.2
Libertarian	Joel Smolen	2,607	1.1
independent (politician)	David Mauricio Munoz (write-in)	75	0.0
Turnout		282,941	
Democratic hold			

United States House of Representatives elections, 2006
Party	Candidate	Votes	%
Democratic	Sam Farr (incumbent)	120,750	75.9
Republican	Anthony R. DeMaio	35,932	22.5
independent (politician)	Jeff Edward Taylor (write-in)	2,611	1.6
Total votes		163,293	100.0
Turnout			
Democratic hold			

United States House of Representatives elections, 2008
Party	Candidate	Votes	%
Democratic	Sam Farr (incumbent)	168,907	73.9
Republican	Jeff Taylor	59,037	25.9
independent (politician)	Peter Andresen (write-in)	682	0.2
Total votes		228,626	100.0
Turnout			
Democratic hold			

United States House of Representatives elections, 2010
Party	Candidate	Votes	%
Democratic	Sam Farr	118,734	66.7
Republican	Jeff Taylor	53,176	29.9
Green	Eric Peterson	3,397	1.9
Libertarian	Mary Larkin	2,742	1.5
Independent	Ronald Kabat (write-in)	90	0.0
Total votes		178,139	100.00
Turnout			
Democratic hold			

United States House of Representatives elections, 2012
Party	Candidate	Votes	%
Democratic	Sam Farr (incumbent)	172,996	74.1
Republican	Jeff Taylor	60,556	25.9
Total votes		233,552	100.0
Turnout			
Democratic hold			

United States House of Representatives elections, 2014
Party	Candidate	Votes	%
Democratic	Sam Farr (incumbent)	106,034	75.2
Independent	Ronald Kabat	35,010	24.8
Total votes		141,044	100.0
Turnout			
Democratic hold			

U.S. House of Representatives
Preceded by Leon Panetta	Member of the U.S. House of Representatives from California's 17th congressional district 1993–2013	Succeeded by Mike Honda
Preceded by Jim Costa	Member of the U.S. House of Representatives from California's 20th congressional district 2013–2017	Succeeded by Jimmy Panetta
U.S. order of precedence (ceremonial)
Preceded by Corrine Brown as Former U.S. Representative	Order of precedence of the United States as Former U.S. Representative	Succeeded by Doug Bereuter as Former U.S. Representative
