= Ahmed F. Mehalba =

Ahmed Fathy Mehalba was a United States Department of Defense civilian translator/ interrogator who was accused of lying to government agents and removing classified documents from the Guantanamo Bay detention facility.

== Childhood and emigration to United States ==
Born in Egypt, Mehalba emigrated to the United States and became a naturalized citizen. Mehalba received a medical discharge from the Army in May 2001 and was later hired a San Diego defense contractor, Titan Corporation, to be an Arabic-English translator at Guantanamo Bay.

== Arrest and conviction ==
In 2003, Mehalba was assigned as a civilian interpreter/ interrogator at Guantanamo. He was arrested on September 29, 2003, at Boston Logan Airport. Mehalba had flown into Logan through Italy from Cairo, Egypt. On a routine admission through U.S. customs, Mehalba presented a U.S. passport and a US military identification card. When asked about some computer CDs, he said that they contained only music and videos he had made while in Egypt. One CD was labeled secret. Mehalba told inspectors that he did not have any official U.S. government documents.

In January 2005, Mehalba pleaded guilty to lying to governments agents and removing classified documents. Mehalba was sentenced to 20 months in prison, with credit for 17 months, time served. He was released in March 2005.
