= Elizabeth Farr =

Elizabeth Farr is an American classical harpsichordist.

== Biography and career ==
Farr has degrees in harpsichord and organ performance from Stetson University, the Juilliard School and the University of Michigan. Farr has studied with Paul Jenkins, Vernon de Tar, and Edward Parmentier.

A specialist in the performance of 17th- and 18th-century keyboard music, Farr has performed as a soloist, and with orchestras, on the harpsichord, organ and pedal harpsichord in the United States and Germany. Farr received 2007 Eaton Faculty Award for achievement in the Arts and Humanities from the University of Colorado, where she teaches organ and harpsichord.

Farr has recorded a number of baroque composers for Naxos Records, notably William Byrd, Peter Philips and Jean-Henri d'Anglebert on harpsichord, and a recording of J. S. Bach's lute-harpsichord music. She received the Preis der deutschen Schallplattenkritik Bestenliste award for her recordings of Élisabeth Jacquet de La Guerre's suites for harpsichord.
