= Jonathan Aldrich =

American poet (1936–2021)

Jonathan Aldrich (January 22, 1936 – January 6, 2021) was an American poet and educator. He was the author of eight collections of poetry and several chapbooks. His collected poems, The Old World in His Arms, was published in 2021 by Wolfson Press.

== Biography ==
Born in Boston, Aldrich was educated at Shady Hill School; Phillips Exeter Academy; Harvard College, where he won the Academy of American Poets Prize and the Lloyd McKim Garrison Prize for Poetry; and the Bread Loaf School of English, where he was a Robert Frost Scholar. He was the elder son of Bailey Aldrich, who served as a United States federal judge for more than 48 years. Jonathan Aldrich taught at Elmira College, Berea College, and (for 25 years) at the Maine College of Art.

Aldrich grew up in Cambridge, Massachusetts, and spent every August at the home of his grandparents in Tenants Harbor, Maine. His memories of his summers there form the basis of his poetic sequence Foam (2012). His grandfather was businessman and painter Talbot Bailey Aldrich, and his great-grandfather was notable 19th century writer and editor Thomas Bailey Aldrich.

Aldrich's first book, Croquet Lover at the Dinner Table (1977), was selected in the Breakthrough Books competition at the University of Missouri Press. The series published first books of poetry and fiction. The title poem in his first collection was first published in 1959 in a slender anthology honoring undergraduate winners of the Academy of American Poets Prize, a publication that featured early works by Sylvia Plath, George Starbuck, and Robert Rehder. Aldrich's book-length poetic sequence Wade's Wait was the first single-author chapbook published by the Beloit Poetry Journal. It appeared as Chapbook 18 in Fall 1985.

He collaborated with artist Alison Hildreth on two books, including his translation of Charles Baudelaire's Le Voyage, which won the Stephen Harvard Award for Excellence in the Book Arts from the Baxter Society. The book is exhibited online by the Fine Arts Museums of San Francisco.

In the oral history collection of the Jackson Memorial Library in St. George, Maine, Jonathan Aldrich's voice is recorded recounting a story about his grandmother, Eleanor Aldrich.

Aldrich married poet Nancy Aldrich (née Jewell) in 1966. Their children are Tom and Tess. Tom Aldrich is a composer.

== Bibliography ==
=== Poetry ===
- Croquet Lover at the Dinner Table (University of Missouri Press 1977)
- Wade's Wait: A Narrative Poem (The Beloit Poetry Journal Chapbook 18, Fall 1985)
- The Death of Michelangelo (Puckerbrush Press, 1985)
- Sonnets for Grimm (Wolfe Editions 2000)
- Figures (Wolfe Editions 2000)
- The Ring Road (Limerock Books 2007)
- Family Romance (with etchings by Alison Hildreth) (Wolfe Editions 2009)
- The Storks of Edam (Bakery Studios 2010)
- Foam: A Poetic Sequence (Bakery Studios 2012)
- Injury (Maine Authors Publishing 2013)
- Out of St. Orange (2015)
- The Old World in His Arms: Collected Poems (Wolfson Press 2021)

=== Translation ===
- Le Voyage (translation of Charles Baudelaire; with drawings by Alison Hildreth) (Wolfe Editions, 1998)

=== Anthologies ===
- The Academy of American Poets University and College Prizes, 1955-1959, Louise Bogan, editor (Academy of American Poets 1959)
- Summer Lines: A Decade of Tenants Harbor Poetry Readings, Christopher Fahy, editor (Limerock Books 2006) ISBN 978-0-974-65892-6
- Branching Out (Limerock Books 2011) ISBN 978-0-974-65896-4
- Routes: 20 Years of Tenants Harbor Poetry Readings (Limerock Books 2016) ISBN 978-0-974-65899-5
