= Anthony Julian =

American judge

Senior Judge of the United States District Court for the District of Massachusetts
- In office August 1, 1972 – January 18, 1984

Chief Judge of the United States District Court for the District of Massachusetts
- In office 1971–1972
- Preceded by: Charles Edward Wyzanski Jr.
- Succeeded by: Andrew A. Caffrey

Judge of the United States District Court for the District of Massachusetts
- In office September 10, 1959 – August 1, 1972
- Appointed by: Dwight D. Eisenhower
- Preceded by: Bailey Aldrich
- Succeeded by: Walter Jay Skinner

United States Attorney for the District of Massachusetts
- In office 1953–1959
- Appointed by: Dwight D. Eisenhower
- Preceded by: George F. Garrity
- Succeeded by: Elliot Richardson

Personal details
- Born: Anthony Julian; March 25, 1902 Italy
- Died: January 18, 1984 (aged 81) Boston, Massachusetts, U.S.
- Education: Boston College (BA); Harvard University (JD)

Anthony Julian (March 25, 1902 – January 18, 1984) was a United States district judge of the United States District Court for the District of Massachusetts.

== Education and career ==
Julian was born Antonio Giuliano in Introdacqua, Abruzzo, Italy and emigrated to the United States while a child. He received an Artium Baccalaureus degree from Boston College in 1925 and a Juris Doctor from Harvard Law School in 1929. He was in private practice in Boston, Massachusetts from 1929 to 1953. He was town counsel of Watertown, Massachusetts from 1930 to 1932 and from 1941 to 1942. He was a faculty member at Boston College from 1934 to 1937, and was a member of the Massachusetts House of Representatives from 1937 to 1938. He was in the United States Army Judge Advocate General's Corps during World War II, from 1942 to 1946, achieving the rank of Major. He was the United States Attorney for the District of Massachusetts from 1953 to 1959.

== Federal judicial service ==
On September 9, 1959, Julian was nominated by President Dwight D. Eisenhower to a seat on the United States District Court for the District of Massachusetts vacated by Judge Bailey Aldrich. Julian was confirmed by the United States Senate on September 9, 1959, and received his commission on September 10, 1959. He served as Chief Judge from 1971 to 1972, assuming senior status on August 1, 1972. Julian served in that capacity until his death on January 18, 1984, in Boston.

== See also ==
- 1937–1938 Massachusetts legislature

== Sources ==
Legal offices
Preceded by Bailey Aldrich	Judge of the United States District Court for the District of Massachusetts; 1959–1972	Succeeded by Walter Jay Skinner
Preceded by Charles Edward Wyzanski Jr.	Chief Judge of the United States District Court for the District of Massachusetts; 1971–1972	Succeeded by Andrew A. Caffrey
