= Cook v. Gates =

American legal case

Thomas Cook v. Robert Gates
- Court: United States Court of Appeals for the First Circuit
- Full case name: Thomas Cook at al., Plaintiffs, v. Robert Gates, et al., Defendants.
- Decided: July 9, 2008
- Citation: 528 F.3d 42 (1st Cir. 2008)

Court membership
- Judges sitting: Jeffrey R. Howard, Levin H. Campbell, Patti B. Saris (by designation)

Case opinions
- Howard; Saris (concurring and dissenting)

Cook v. Gates, 528 F.3d 42 (1st Cir. 2008), is a decision on July 9, 2008, of the United States Court of Appeals for the First Circuit that upheld the "Don't ask, Don't tell" (DADT) policy (Title 10, Section 654) against due process and equal protection Fifth Amendment challenges and a free speech challenge under the First Amendment, and which found that no earlier Supreme Court decision held that sexual orientation is a suspect or quasi-suspect classification.

== Case history ==
Seven former members of the military discharged under the law filed suit in the U.S. District Court for the District of Massachusetts asking for an injunction for readmission into the military and prohibiting further enforcement of the law. The government filed for a motion to dismiss for failure to state a claim upon which relief can be granted. On April 24, 2006, U.S. District Judge George A. O'Toole Jr., upheld the act under rational basis review and granted the government's motion to dismiss the suit.

The case was heard on appeal by a three-judge panel of the First Circuit Court of Appeals that issued its decision upholding DADT on July 9, 2008.

=== Due Process and Lawrence ===
In evaluating the substantive due process claim, the Court first looked over Lawrence v. Texas, 539 U.S. 558 (2003), the Supreme Court case striking down convictions of Texas's sodomy law, to determine the appropriate standard of scrutiny. They held that Lawrence recognized "a protected liberty interest for adults to engage in private, consensual sexual intimacy and applied a balancing of constitutional interests that defied either the rational basis or strict scrutiny label." In reaching this holding, the Court noted that Lawrence relied on Griswold v. Connecticut, Eisenstadt v. Baird, Roe v. Wade, Carey v. Population Services International, and Planned Parenthood of Southeastern Pennsylvania v. Casey. Second, it noted that the language of Lawrence "supports the recognition of a protected liberty interest". Third, it noted that Lawrence relied on Justice Stevens's dissent in Bowers v. Hardwick in which he wrote that "it is impossible to read Lawrence as declining to recognize a protected liberty interest without ignoring the Court's statement that Justice Stevens' Bowers dissent was controlling". Fourth it noted that if Lawrence had applied traditional rational basis review, "the convictions under the Texas statute would have been sustained", on the basis that Lawrence can "only be squared with the Supreme Court's acknowledgment of morality as a rational basis by concluding that a protected liberty interest was at stake, and therefore a rational basis for the law was not sufficient." It thus rejected the district court's view that Lawrence applied the rational basis standard of review.

Balancing "the strength of the [government's] asserted interest[s] ... against the degree of intrusion into the petitioners' private sexual life caused by the statute in order to determine whether the law was unconstitutionally applied", the Court evaluated the plaintiffs' facial due process claims and rejected them, on the basis that "the [Supreme] Court made it abundantly clear that there are many types of sexual activity that are beyond the reach of that opinion" and that the "Act includes such other types of sexual activity. The Act provides for the separation of a service person who engages in a public homosexual act or who coerces another person to engage in a homosexual act", which are "expressly excluded from the liberty interest recognized by Lawrence."

Turning to the plaintiffs' as-applied challenges, the Court recognized that the "Act, for example, could cover homosexual conduct occurring off base between two consenting adults in the privacy of their home." They also recognized that they were "reviewing an exercise of Congressional judgment in the area of military affairs" and that the "deferential approach courts take when doing so is well established." Because "Congress [had] articulated a substantial government interest for a law, and where the challenges in question implicate that interest, judicial intrusion [was] simply not warranted", and the Court rejected the as-applied challenges.

=== Equal Protection and suspect classification ===
The Court then decided the issue of whether earlier Supreme Court decisions held that sexual orientation was a suspect classification. In rejecting plaintiffs' arguments in favor of that, they noted that "Romer [v. Evans, 517 U.S. 620 (1996)], by its own terms, applied rational basis review", that "Romer nowhere suggested that the Court recognized a new suspect class", and that the "Lawrence Court explicitly declined to base its ruling on equal protection principles, even though that issue was presented". Because "Congress has put forward a non-animus based explanation for its decision to pass the Act", the Court rejected the equal protection claims.

=== First Amendment ===
In addressing the First Amendment claim, the Court noted that their "review of military regulations challenged on First Amendment grounds is far more deferential than constitutional review of similar laws or regulations designed for civilian society." and because it was "thus aimed at eliminating certain conduct or the possibility of certain conduct from occurring in the military environment, not at restricting speech", the First Amendment claim was rejected.

=== Dissent ===
Judge Saris, a District Court judge sitting on the Court of Appeals by designation, concurred with the majority regarding due process and equal protection, while dissenting with the rejection of the First Amendment challenge, because "if the Act were applied to punish statements about one's status as a homosexual, it would constitute a content-based speech restriction subject to strict scrutiny" and that "the availability of an administrative remedy does not defeat a First Amendment claim that the government is systematically applying the Act in such a way that it unconstitutionally burdens protected speech".

=== Cert petition ===
James E. Pietrangelo, one of the Cook plaintiffs, petitioned for a writ of certiorari to the United States Supreme Court. The petition was rejected
