= A. David Mazzone =

American judge

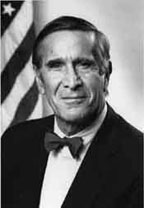

Senior Judge of the United States District Court for the District of Massachusetts
- In office June 3, 1993 – October 25, 2004

Judge of the United States District Court for the District of Massachusetts
- In office February 10, 1978 – June 3, 1993
- Appointed by: Jimmy Carter
- Preceded by: Frank Jerome Murray
- Succeeded by: Nancy Gertner

Personal details
- Born: Armando David Mazzone; June 3, 1928 Everett, Massachusetts, U.S.
- Died: October 25, 2004 (aged 76) Wakefield, Massachusetts, U.S.
- Education: Harvard University (BA); DePaul University (JD)

Armando David Mazzone (June 3, 1928 – October 25, 2004) served for twenty-six years as a United States district judge of the United States District Court for the District of Massachusetts.

"He will forever be remembered by the people of Massachusetts for his landmark rulings that led to the cleanup of Boston Harbor," United States Senator Edward M. Kennedy said to the Boston Globe shortly after Mazzone's death in October 2004.

== Education and career ==
Mazzone was born Armando David Mazzone in Everett, Massachusetts, to immigrant parents. He was a star tight end on the Everett High School football team, where he won all-scholastic honors, and he later played tight end on the Harvard College team. After graduating from Harvard with a Bachelor of Arts degree in 1950, he became a supervisor at Inland Steel Corp., a steel mill in East Chicago, Indiana. He served in the United States Army for two years during the Korean War, then returned to the steel mill and enrolled at DePaul University College of Law, graduating with a Juris Doctor in 1957. After law school, he opened a small law office in Chicago, Illinois, but soon returned to Massachusetts, where he spent two years as an Assistant District Attorney of Middlesex County and four years as an Assistant United States Attorney under Wendell Arthur Garrity Jr. In 1965, Mazzone and three other Assistant United States Attorneys resigned to open their own law firm, Moulton, Looney, Mazzone, & Falk. They were later joined by former US Attorney, Paul Markham. He remained in private practice until his appointment to the Superior Court of the Commonwealth of Massachusetts by Governor Michael Dukakis in 1974.

== Federal judicial service ==
Mazzone was nominated by President Jimmy Carter on January 26, 1978, to a seat on the United States District Court for the District of Massachusetts vacated by Judge Frank Jerome Murray. He was confirmed by the United States Senate on February 7, 1978, and received his commission on February 10, 1978. He assumed senior status on June 3, 1993. His service terminated on October 25, 2004, due to his death in Wakefield, Massachusetts.

== Boston Harbor case ==
In the early 1980s, the Conservation Law Foundation and the City of Quincy, Massachusetts sued the regional Metropolitan District Commission, saying that it violated clean water statutes because its antiquated sewage treatment plant on Deer Island was dumping hundreds of tons of black sludge into the harbor daily. The United States Environmental Protection Agency later joined the suit. Judge Mazzone ruled the Massachusetts Water Resources Authority (which was the successor to the Municipal District Commission's operations of the Boston regional water and sewage systems), was in "chronic, flagrant violation" of federal law, and ordered it to set deadlines for a cleanup. He oversaw the case himself, rather than appointing a special master as judges often do in long-running cases.

== Judicial philosophy ==
Judge Mazzone was known for his dedication not only to headline-producing cases, but to the routine caseload of a federal court, which he characterized as "doing the nation's work."

"I don't think there are any secrets to being a good judge," Mazzone said in a 1984 interview with the Boston Globe. "You have to work at it. Few of us have the brilliance of a (Judge Charles E.) Wyzanski or a (Judge) Learned Hand. What you have is a respect for the law, a knowledge of the principles and a desire to do the best job you can. Good lawyers make good judges. Any lawyer can make a judge look bad. But a good lawyer playing by the rules, playing it straight makes a good case, and the judge is merely incidental, truly an impartial arbiter. A judge should just be there with a knowledge of the law and leave the lawyering to the lawyers."

== Memorial ==
The memorial to Judge Mazzone on Deer Island

A memorial to Judge Mazzone on Deer Island in Boston Harbor (pictured above), near the Deer Island Waste Water Treatment Plant was dedicated on October 19, 2007.

== See also ==
- Massachusetts Water Resources Authority
- Conservation Law Foundation

== Sources ==
Legal offices
Preceded by Frank Jerome Murray	Judge of the United States District Court for the District of Massachusetts; 1978–1993	Succeeded by Nancy Gertner
