= Judge Hillman =

Judge Hillman may refer to:

- Douglas Woodruff Hillman (1922–2007), judge of the United States District Court for the Western District of Michigan
- Noel Lawrence Hillman (born 1956), judge of the United States District Court for the District of New Jersey
- Timothy S. Hillman (born 1948), judge of the United States District Court for the District of Massachusetts
