= F. Dennis Saylor IV =

American judge (born 1955)

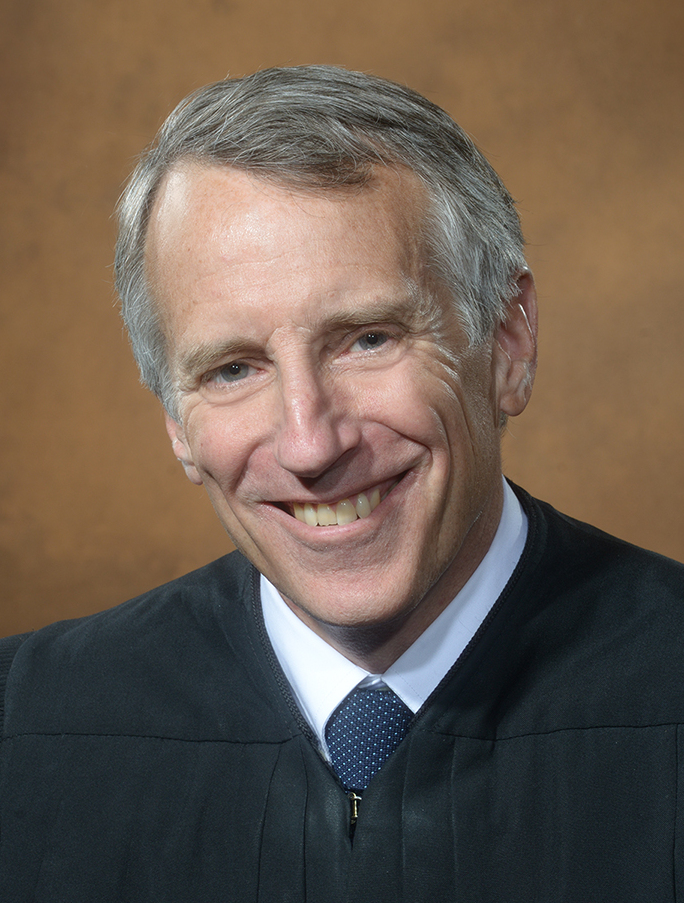
- Saylor in 2017

Senior Judge of the United States District Court for the District of Massachusetts
- Incumbent
- Assumed office July 31, 2025

Chief Judge of the United States District Court for the District of Massachusetts
- In office January 1, 2020 – July 1, 2025
- Preceded by: Patti B. Saris
- Succeeded by: Denise J. Casper

Judge of the United States District Court for the District of Massachusetts
- In office June 2, 2004 – July 31, 2025
- Appointed by: George W. Bush
- Preceded by: Robert Keeton
- Succeeded by: vacant

Personal details
- Born: Frank Dennis Saylor IV; 1955 (age 70–71) Royal Oak, Michigan, U.S.
- Education: Northwestern University (BS); Harvard University (JD)

Frank Dennis Saylor IV (born 1955) is a senior United States district judge of the United States District Court for the District of Massachusetts and was formerly a Judge on the United States Foreign Intelligence Surveillance Court.

== Early life and education ==
Saylor was born in Royal Oak, Michigan. He received a Bachelor of Science degree from Northwestern University in 1977, and a Juris Doctor from Harvard Law School in 1981.

== Career ==
Saylor was in private practice at Goodwin Procter in Boston, from 1981 to 1987, and from 1993 to 2004. He was an assistant United States attorney in the U.S. Attorney's Office for the District of Massachusetts from 1987 to 1990. He later was a special counsel and chief of staff to Robert Mueller, then assistant attorney general of the Criminal Division at the United States Department of Justice, from 1990 to 1993.

While at Goodwin Procter, Saylor represented Circor International, Inc., KF Industries, Inc., and senior company officials as a criminal defense attorney while those companies were under investigation for smuggling Chinese-manufactured valves and selling the valves as a product of the U.S. between 2001 and 2004. The U.S. Attorney for the Southern District of Texas, Michael T. Shelby, dismissed the investigation days after Saylor was confirmed by the Senate.

=== Federal judicial service ===
On July 30, 2003, Saylor was nominated by President George W. Bush to a seat on the United States District Court for the District of Massachusetts vacated by Robert Keeton. Saylor was confirmed by the United States Senate on June 1, 2004, and received his commission on June 2, 2004. He also served a term on the United States Foreign Intelligence Surveillance Court from 2011 to 2018. Saylor became the chief judge on January 1, 2020, serving it until July 1, 2025. Saylor assumed senior status on July 31, 2025.

== Sources ==
Legal offices
| Preceded by Robert Keeton | Judge of the United States District Court for the District of Massachusetts; 2004–2025 | Vacant |
| Preceded by Patti B. Saris | Chief Judge of the United States District Court for the District of Massachusetts; 2020–2025 | Succeeded by Denise J. Casper |
