= Arthur I. Segel =

American economist

Arthur Segel

Personal details
- Spouse: Patti B. Saris
- Education: Harvard University (BA); Stanford University (MBA)

Arthur I. Segel is an American economist and businessman. He teaches at Harvard Business School, where he is the Baker Foundation Professor of Management Practice. He was previously the Poorvu Family Professor of Management Practice, also at Harvard Business School. He is also an Elected Fellow of the American Academy of Arts & Sciences.

Segel is married to Patti B. Saris, a senior judge for the United States District Court for the District of Massachusetts.
