= Robert Keeton =

American judge

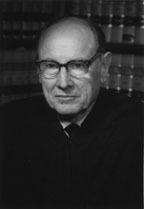

Senior Judge of the United States District Court for the District of Massachusetts
- In office February 28, 2003 – September 8, 2006

Judge of the United States District Court for the District of Massachusetts
- In office March 23, 1979 – February 28, 2003
- Appointed by: Jimmy Carter
- Preceded by: Seat established by 92 Stat. 1629
- Succeeded by: F. Dennis Saylor IV

Personal details
- Born: Robert Ernest Keeton; December 16, 1919 Clarksville, Texas, U.S.
- Died: July 2, 2007 (aged 87) Cambridge, Massachusetts, U.S.
- Relatives: W. Page Keeton (brother)
- Education: University of Texas at Austin (BBA, LLB); Harvard University (SJD)

Robert Ernest Keeton (December 16, 1919 – July 2, 2007) was an American lawyer, jurist, and legal scholar. As a law professor at Harvard Law School and a United States district judge of the United States District Court for the District of Massachusetts he was known for his work on torts, insurance law, and practical courtroom tactics. Keeton, with Jeffrey O'Connell of the University of Virginia School of Law, played a key role in the advancement of no-fault automobile insurance.

== Education and legal career ==
Keeton was born in Clarksville, Texas. He was the second youngest of five children of William Keeton (who owned a general store) and Ernestine Teuton Keeton. One of his brothers, W. Page Keeton, also became a prominent lawyer and educator. Keeton earned his Bachelor of Business Administration from the University of Texas at Austin and his Bachelor of Laws from the University of Texas School of Law. As an undergraduate he became one of three students inducted into the Friar Society, an honor society at the University of Texas. In law school he was the assistant editor-in-chief of the Texas Law Review. Keeton went into private practice with the law firm of Baker & Botts in Houston before joining the United States Navy in World War II. As a lieutenant serving aboard the escort aircraft carrier USS Liscome Bay (CVE-56) he survived the sinking of the ship on November 24, 1943, by a torpedo from the Japanese submarine I-175. Keeton, clinging to debris for hours, was later pulled from the ocean. He was awarded a Purple Heart. Keeton returned to Baker & Botts in 1945 after the war. He later taught at Southern Methodist University.

== Further education and academic career ==
Keeton joined Harvard Law School in 1953, where he would remain until 1979. In 1954, he wrote Trial Tactics and Methods, a book of practical advice on courtroom skills. Keeton later developed a program at Harvard (later used at other law schools) in which experienced trial lawyers taught students. One rule of Keeton's program was to not ask hostile witnesses open-ended questions. In 1956, Keeton received his Doctor of Juridical Science from Harvard. In 1973, he was named the Langdell Professor of Law. Keeton served as associate dean from 1975 to 1979. In the early 1970s, Keeton worked with University of Virginia School of Law professor Jeffrey O'Connell on a study that contributed to the development of no-fault automobile insurance, later adopted by many states. Under a no-fault system, damages below a certain level are paid by insurance companies, thus avoiding a determination of who was at fault.

== Federal judicial service ==
Keeton was nominated by President Jimmy Carter on January 25, 1979, to the United States District Court for the District of Massachusetts, to a new seat authorized by 92 Stat. 1629. He was confirmed by the United States Senate on March 21, 1979, and received his commission on March 23, 1979. He assumed senior status on February 28, 2003. His service terminated on September 8, 2006, due to retirement. In 1979 Chief Justice Warren Burger appointed him chair of the Standing Committee on Rules of Practice and Procedure of the Judicial Conference of the United States, a body responsible for developing the Federal Rules of Civil Procedure and Federal Rules of Criminal Procedure.

== Notable cases ==
Keeton presided over the 1988–1989 mail fraud and obstruction of justice trial of Lyndon LaRouche and eleven associates, which ended with Keeton declaring a mistrial. He also presided over the 1995 Lotus Dev. Corp. v. Borland Int'l, Inc. trial involving the extent of software copyright, a case that later was decided by the Supreme Court. In 1984 Keeton, along with older brother Page as lead author, and professors Dan Dobbs and David Owen, published the 5th edition of Prosser and Keeton on Torts. The book, based on William Prosser's influential Prosser on Torts (1941), became a foundational text of tort law and has become frequently used as a law textbook and reference work for many law students, lawyers, and jurists.

== Death ==
Keeton died of complications of a pulmonary embolism in Cambridge, Massachusetts, where he lived. He was 87.

== Sources ==
Legal offices
Preceded by Seat established by 92 Stat. 1629	Judge of the United States District Court for the District of Massachusetts; 1979–2003	Succeeded by F. Dennis Saylor IV
