= Patti B. Saris =

American judge (born 1951)

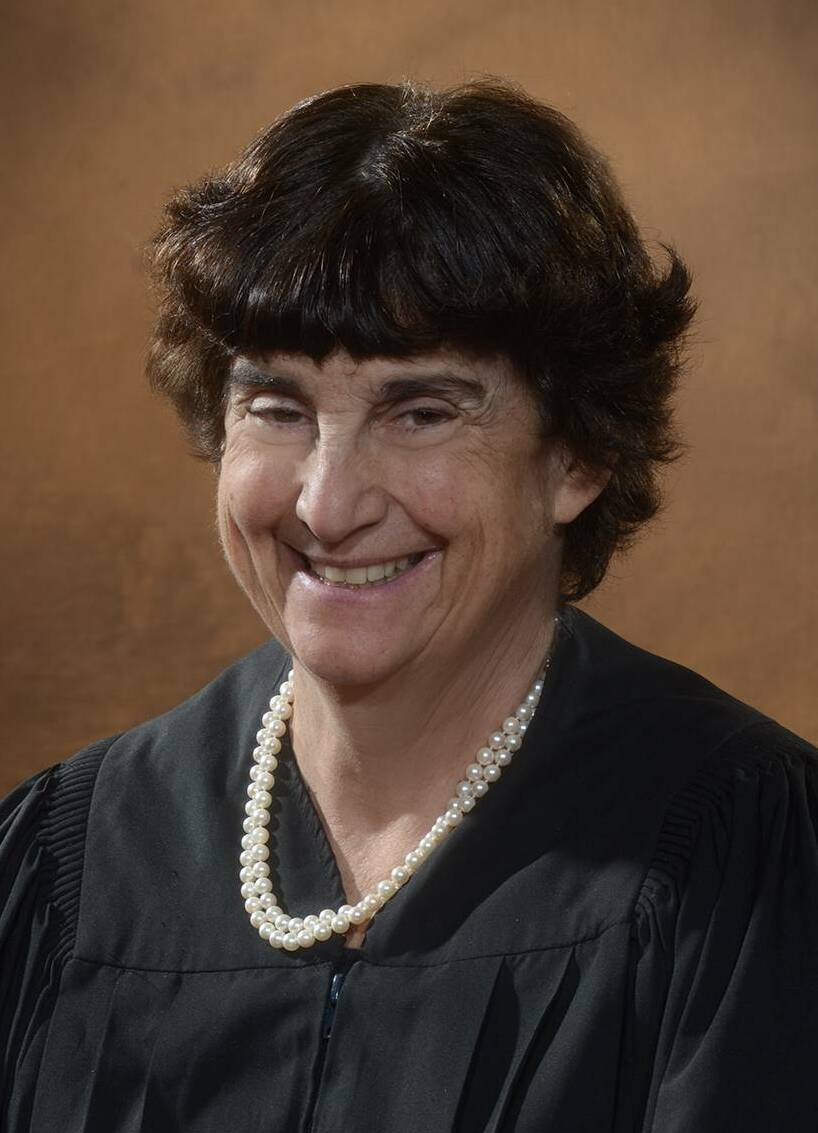
- Saris in 2015

Senior Judge of the United States District Court for the District of Massachusetts
- Incumbent
- Assumed office December 2, 2024

Chief Judge of the United States District Court for the District of Massachusetts
- In office January 1, 2013 – December 31, 2019
- Preceded by: Mark L. Wolf
- Succeeded by: F. Dennis Saylor IV

Chair of the United States Sentencing Commission
- In office December 22, 2010 – January 3, 2017
- President: Barack Obama
- Preceded by: William K. Sessions III
- Succeeded by: William H. Pryor Jr. (Acting)

Judge of the United States District Court for the District of Massachusetts
- In office November 24, 1993 – December 2, 2024
- Appointed by: Bill Clinton
- Preceded by: Walter Jay Skinner
- Succeeded by: Brian E. Murphy

Magistrate Judge of the United States District Court for the District of Massachusetts
- In office 1986–1989

Personal details
- Born: July 20, 1951 (age 74) Boston, Massachusetts, U.S.
- Spouse: Arthur I. Segel
- Education: Radcliffe College (BA); Harvard University (JD)

Patti Barbara Saris (born July 20, 1951) is a senior United States district judge of the United States District Court for the District of Massachusetts. She is also the former chair of the United States Sentencing Commission.

== Early life and education ==
Saris was born in Boston, Massachusetts. She attended Girls' Latin School, and later received a Bachelor of Arts degree from Radcliffe College in 1973 and a Juris Doctor from Harvard Law School in 1976.

== Legal career ==
Saris was a law clerk for Judge Robert Braucher of the Massachusetts Supreme Judicial Court from 1976 to 1977. She was in private practice with the law firm of Foley, Hoag & Eliot in Boston from 1977 to 1979, served as staff counsel to the United States Senate Committee on the Judiciary from 1979 to 1981, and then returned to private practice with the firm of Berman, Dittmar & Engel, P.C. from 1981 to 1982.

Saris then served as Assistant United States Attorney of the District of Massachusetts from 1982 to 1986. She was chief of the Civil Division from 1984 to 1986. From 1986 to 1989 she was a United States magistrate judge for the District of Massachusetts. She was an associate justice in the Trial Court of Massachusetts, Superior Court Department from 1989 to 1993.

== Federal judicial service ==
On the recommendation of Senators Ted Kennedy and John Kerry, Saris was nominated as a United States District Judge of the United States District Court for the District of Massachusetts by President Bill Clinton on October 27, 1993, to a seat vacated by Walter Jay Skinner. She was confirmed by the United States Senate on November 20, 1993, and received her commission on November 24, 1993. She served as Chief Judge from January 1, 2013, until December 31, 2019. On November 20, 2023, she announced her intention to assume senior status upon confirmation of a successor. She assumed senior status on December 2, 2024.

In 2008, Saris sat by designation with the United States Court of Appeals for the First Circuit in the case of Cook v. Gates, which upheld the "Don't ask, Don't tell" (DADT) policy (Title 10, Section 654) against due process and equal protection Fifth Amendment challenges and a free speech challenge under the First Amendment, and which found that no earlier Supreme Court decision held that sexual orientation is a suspect or quasi-suspect classification. Saris concurred with the majority regarding due process and equal protection, while dissenting with the rejection of the First Amendment challenge, because "if the Act were applied to punish statements about one's status as a homosexual, it would constitute a content-based speech restriction subject to strict scrutiny" and that "the availability of an administrative remedy does not defeat a First Amendment claim that the government is systematically applying the Act in such a way that it unconstitutionally burdens protected speech".

In December 2025, Saris ruled that an executive order issued by President Donald Trump freezing federal approval of new offshore and onshore wind energy permits was unlawful. In a case brought by 17 states and a New York–based clean energy organization, Saris vacated the order, finding it to be “arbitrary and capricious and contrary to law.” The ruling followed the federal government’s stop-work directive affecting projects such as the Empire Wind 1 offshore wind farm planned off the coast of New York, which was intended to supply electricity to approximately 500,000 homes.

=== United States Sentencing Commission ===
In April 2010, President Obama nominated Saris as commissioner and chair of the United States Sentencing Commission. She was confirmed by the Senate on December 22, 2010 and sworn in by Justice Elena Kagan on February 16, 2011. Her term expired on January 3, 2017.

== See also ==
- List of Jewish American jurists
- List of United States federal judges by longevity of service

Legal offices
Preceded by Walter Jay Skinner	Judge of the United States District Court for the District of Massachusetts; 1993–2024	Succeeded by Brian E. Murphy
Preceded by William K. Sessions III	Chair of the United States Sentencing Commission; 2010–2017	Succeeded by William H. Pryor, Jr. (acting)
Preceded by Mark L. Wolf	Chief Judge of the United States District Court for the District of Massachusetts; 2013–2019	Succeeded by F. Dennis Saylor IV
