= George Clinton Sweeney =

American judge

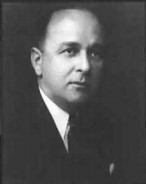

Senior Judge of the United States District Court for the District of Massachusetts
- In office September 30, 1966 – November 5, 1966

Chief Judge of the United States District Court for the District of Massachusetts
- In office 1948–1965
- Preceded by: Office established
- Succeeded by: Charles Edward Wyzanski Jr.

Judge of the United States District Court for the District of Massachusetts
- In office August 24, 1935 – September 30, 1966
- Appointed by: Franklin D. Roosevelt
- Preceded by: James Arnold Lowell
- Succeeded by: Frank Jerome Murray

Personal details
- Born: George Clinton Sweeney; July 23, 1895 Gardner, Massachusetts
- Died: November 5, 1966 (aged 71)
- Education: Georgetown Law (LL.B.)

George Clinton Sweeney (July 23, 1895 – November 5, 1966) was a United States district judge of the United States District Court for the District of Massachusetts.

== Education and career ==
Born in Gardner, Massachusetts, Sweeney received a Bachelor of Laws from Georgetown Law in 1922. He was in the United States Army as a Sergeant from 1917 to 1918. He was in private practice in Gardner from 1924 to 1935. He served as Mayor of Gardner from 1931 to 1933. He was an assistant attorney general of the United States Department of Justice from 1933 to 1935. He was the first Knight of Columbus to be made a judge in Massachusetts.

== Federal judicial service ==
Sweeney was nominated by President Franklin D. Roosevelt on August 20, 1935, to a seat on the United States District Court for the District of Massachusetts vacated by Judge James Arnold Lowell. He was confirmed by the United States Senate on August 21, 1935, and received his commission on August 24, 1935. He served as Chief Judge from 1948 to 1965 and as a member of the Judicial Conference of the United States from 1958 to 1961. He assumed senior status on September 30, 1966. Sweeney served in that capacity until his death on November 5, 1966.

== See also ==
- List of United States federal judges by longevity of service

== Sources ==
Legal offices
Preceded by James Arnold Lowell	Judge of the United States District Court for the District of Massachusetts; 1935–1966	Succeeded by Frank Jerome Murray
Preceded by Office established	Chief Judge of the United States District Court for the District of Massachusetts; 1948–1965	Succeeded by Charles Edward Wyzanski Jr.
