= Jeffrey O'Connell =

American academic (1928–2013)

Jeffrey Thomas O'Connell
- Born: September 29, 1928; Worcester, Massachusetts
- Died: January 6, 2013 (aged 84); Charlottesville, Virginia
- Education: Dartmouth College, Harvard Law School
- Occupations: Attorney, professor of law
- Employer: University of Virginia

Jeffrey Thomas O'Connell (September 29, 1928 – January 6, 2013) was an American legal expert, professor, and attorney. In 1965, O'Connell and Harvard Law School professor Robert Keeton co-authored the book Basic Protection for the Traffic Victim: A Blueprint for Reforming Automobile Insurance, which created the theoretical underpinnings of no-fault law. His specialty was product liability, and he wrote numerous books about this, advocating no-fault insurance for automobiles and other products.

== Biography ==
O'Connell was born in Worcester, Massachusetts. O’Connell began his legal career as a trial lawyer in Boston for the firm Hale and Dorr before turning to higher education. He served on the faculty at the University of Virginia as the Samuel H. McCoy II Professor of Law from 1980 until his retirement in the spring of 2012. Prior to joining UVA's faculty, O'Connell taught at the University of Illinois for 16 years. He also taught at the University of Iowa and was a visiting professor at Northwestern University, the University of Michigan, Southern Methodist University, the University of Texas at Austin, the University of Washington, and Oxford and Cambridge Universities in England. He received 2 Guggenheim Fellowships and was a resident at the Rockefeller Foundation Bellagio Center in 1987.

== Works ==
=== Books on tort reform and law ===
- (with Christopher J. Robinette) A Recipe for Balanced Tort Reform: Early Offers with Swift Settlements. Durham, N.C: Carolina Academic Press, 2008. ISBN 9781594602825
- (with Peter A. Bell) Accidental Justice The Dilemmas of Tort Law. New Haven: Yale University Press, 1997. ISBN 9780585347561. According to WorldCat, there are 811 library holdings of this title.
- (with C. B. Kelly) The Blame Game: Injuries, Insurance, and Injustice. Lexington, Mass: Lexington Books, 1987 ISBN 9780669139167
- The Lawsuit Lottery: Only the Lawyers Win. New York: Free Press, 1979. ISBN 9780029232804
- Ending Insult to Injury: No-fault Insurance for Products and Services. Urbana: University of Illinois Press, 1975. ISBN 9780252004513 (with a foreword by Daniel P. Moynihan) According to WorldCat, there are 557 library holdings of this title.
- (with Rita J. Simon) Payment for Pain & Suffering: Who Wants What, When & Why? Champaign-Urbana, Ill: Insurors Press, 1972. OCLC 690119
- The injury industry and the remedy of no-fault insurance, New York : Commerce Clearing House, 1971. OCLC 280296 (with a foreword by Daniel P. Moynihan). According to WorldCat, there are 678 library holdings of this title.
- (with Wallace H. Wilson) Car Insurance and Consumer Desires. Urbana: University of Illinois Press, 1969. ISBN 9780252000331
- (with Robert E. Keeton) Justice and the Adversary System. An Analysis of the Keeton-O'Connell Plan and its Effect on Justice and the Law Showing the Bar's Concern For Protecting the Public Interest and Welfare. American Trial Lawyers Association, 1968 OCLC 26581742
- (with Robert E. Keeton) After cars crash; the need for legal and insurance reform Homewood, Ill., Dow Jones-Irwin, 1967 OCLC 732450
- (with Arthur B. Myers) Safety Last: An Indictment of the Auto Industry. New York: Random House, 1966. OCLC 1477821.
- (with Robert E. Keeton) Basic Protection for the Traffic Victim: A Blueprint for Reforming Automobile Insurance. Boston: Little, Brown, 1965. OCLC 522849

=== Other books ===
- (with Thomas E. O'Connell.) Five 20th-Century College Presidents: From Butler to Bok (plus Summers). Durham, N.C: Carolina Academic Press, 2012
- (with Thomas E. O'Connell.) Political and Legal Adventurers: From Marx to Moynihan. Durham, N.C: Carolina Academic Press, 2009. ISBN 9781594602849
- (with Thomas E. O'Connell.) Friendships Across Ages: Johnson and Boswell : Holmes and Laski. Lanham, Md: Lexington Books, 2008. ISBN 9780739120347.
