= Walter Jay Skinner =

American judge

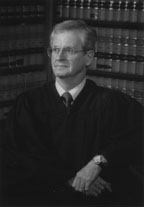

Senior Judge of the United States District Court for the District of Massachusetts
- In office September 14, 1992 – May 8, 2005

Judge of the United States District Court for the District of Massachusetts
- In office December 19, 1973 – September 14, 1992
- Appointed by: Richard Nixon
- Preceded by: Anthony Julian
- Succeeded by: Patti B. Saris

Personal details
- Born: September 12, 1927 Washington, D.C., U.S.
- Died: May 8, 2005 (aged 77) Concord, Massachusetts, U.S.
- Education: Harvard University (AB, JD)

Walter Jay Skinner (September 12, 1927 – May 8, 2005) was a United States district judge of the United States District Court for the District of Massachusetts.

== Education and career ==
Born in Washington, D.C., Skinner received an Artium Baccalaureus degree from Harvard University in 1948 and a Juris Doctor from Harvard Law School in 1952. He was in private practice in Boston, Massachusetts from 1952 to 1957, and in Scituate, Massachusetts from 1957 to 1963, and was also Scituate's town counsel and an assistant district attorney of Plymouth County, Massachusetts from 1957 to 1963. He was an assistant attorney general and chief of the Massachusetts Criminal Division from 1963 to 1965, thereafter returning to private practice in Boston until 1973.

== Federal judicial service ==
On October 10, 1973, Skinner was nominated by President Richard Nixon to a seat on the United States District Court for the District of Massachusetts vacated by Judge Anthony Julian. Skinner was confirmed by the United States Senate on December 14, 1973, and received his commission on December 19, 1973. In 1978, the judge refused to hear an after-hours case seeking to permit the New Hampshire governor to fly flags at half staff on Good Friday, to "memorialize the death of Christ".

Skinner returned to public attention in 1986 during the civil trials for contamination of the Woburn wells and water supply, first by imposing a gag order on the plaintiffs, preventing them from making public comment about the case; and then by throwing out the jury's guilty verdict against W. R. Grace on the grounds that he found some of their answers to the questions about the hydrogeological data to be confusing. Skinner was portrayed by John Lithgow in the 1998 film A Civil Action about the Woburn case.

In 1988, Skinner notably considered a plan to gradually release certain inmates prior to the completion of their sentences, in an effort to relieve overcrowding in county and city jails.

He assumed senior status on September 14, 1992, serving in that capacity until his death on May 8, 2005, in Concord, Massachusetts.

== Sources ==
Legal offices
Preceded by Anthony Julian	Judge of the United States District Court for the District of Massachusetts; 1973–1992	Succeeded by Patti B. Saris
