= Margaret R. Guzman =

American judge (born 1960)

Margaret Guzman
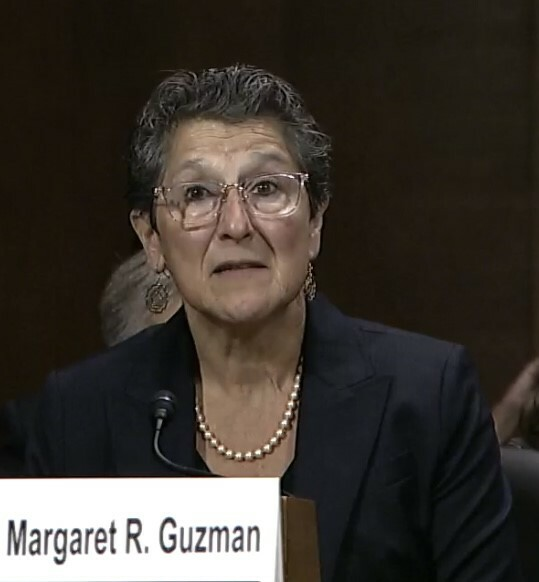

Judge of the United States District Court for the District of Massachusetts
- Incumbent
- Assumed office March 3, 2023
- Appointed by: Joe Biden
- Preceded by: Timothy S. Hillman

First Justice of the Ayer District Court
- In office 2017 – March 3, 2023

Associate Justice of the Massachusetts Trial Court
- In office 2009–2017
- Appointed by: Deval Patrick

Personal details
- Born: Margaret Rose Guzman; 1960 (age 65–66) Worcester, Massachusetts, U.S.
- Education: Clark University (BA); Boston University (JD)

Margaret Rose Guzman (born 1960) is an American attorney serving as a United States District Judge of the United States District Court for the District of Massachusetts. She previously served as a judge of the Ayer District Court in Middlesex County, Massachusetts.

== Education ==
Guzman initially enrolled at the University of Southern Maine for her undergraduate education but transferred to Clark University where she earned a Bachelor of Arts degree in 1989. She received her Juris Doctor from the Boston University School of Law in 1992.

== Career ==
From 1992 to 2005, Guzman served as a public defender for the Massachusetts Committee for Public Counsel Services. She was a sole practitioner in Worcester, Massachusetts, from 2005 to 2009. From 2009 to 2017, she served as a judge on Dudley District Court. In 2012, the special counsel for the Massachusetts Supreme Judicial Court noted that Guzman had acquitted all 149 defendants who appeared before her in bench trials on drunk driving charges. The report, which did not allege judicial misconduct, called for reform of procedures to ensure that lawyers did not engage in judge shopping. She joined the Ayer District Court in 2017 and left in 2023 to become a federal judge.

=== Federal judicial service ===
On July 13, 2022, President Joe Biden nominated Guzman to serve as a United States District Judge of the United States District Court for the District of Massachusetts. President Biden nominated Guzman to the seat vacated by Judge Timothy S. Hillman, who assumed senior status on July 1, 2022. On September 21, 2022, a hearing on her nomination was held before the Senate Judiciary Committee. Conservatives and law enforcement attacked her nomination, claiming that she is reflexively pro-criminal defendant and pointing out that Guzman had acquitted all 149 defendants who appeared before her in bench trials on drunk driving charges while serving as a judge on Dudley District Court. On December 1, 2022, her nomination was reported out of committee by a 12–10 vote. On January 3, 2023, her nomination was returned to the President under Rule XXXI, Paragraph 6 of the United States Senate; she was renominated later the same day. On February 2, 2023, her nomination was reported out of committee by an 11–9 vote. On February 28, 2023, the Senate invoked cloture on her nomination by a 49–48 vote, with the Vice President Kamala Harris voting for the affirmative. On March 1, 2023, her nomination was confirmed by a 49–48 vote, with the vice president casting the tie-breaking vote. She received her judicial commission on March 3, 2023. She is the first Hispanic judge to serve on the District Court for the District of Massachusetts.

== Notable cases ==
In December 2023, Guzman allowed a lawsuit against 3M and other corporations to proceed. The lawsuit was filed by Massachusetts homeowners who had their water tested and found that their drinking water contained excessive and potentially dangerous amounts of PFAS.

=== 2026 sentencing controversy and recusal ===
On January 23, 2026, Guzman sentenced Moises and Kiersten Soto to 18 years in federal prison following their convictions for sex trafficking. During a recess in the sentencing hearing, a member of Guzman's staff handed federal prosecutors an envelope intended for the victim, who was not present. Prosecutors subsequently disclosed that the envelope contained a handwritten card from Guzman, a bracelet, and several seashells. Defense attorneys said they were not informed of the communication until five days after sentencing.

Defense counsel subsequently sought a new trial and resentencing, arguing that the communication raised questions about Guzman's impartiality and demonstrated potential bias toward the prosecution's principal witness. Federal prosecutors opposed a new trial, maintaining that the gesture represented sympathy for the victim after the jury's guilty verdict, but agreed that resentencing before a different judge was appropriate.

Guzman recused herself from the case on February 20, 2026, one day after defense counsel filed a motion for a new trial. The proceedings were reassigned to U.S. District Judge Myong J. Joun. On July 20, 2026, Joun vacated both defendants' original 18-year prison sentences. The defendants also sought to overturn their convictions and obtain a new trial.

== See also ==
- Joe Biden judicial appointment controversies - List of Hispanic and Latino American jurists

Legal offices
Preceded by Timothy S. Hillman	Judge of the United States District Court for the District of Massachusetts; 2023–present	Incumbent
