= Charles Edward Wyzanski Jr. =

American judge

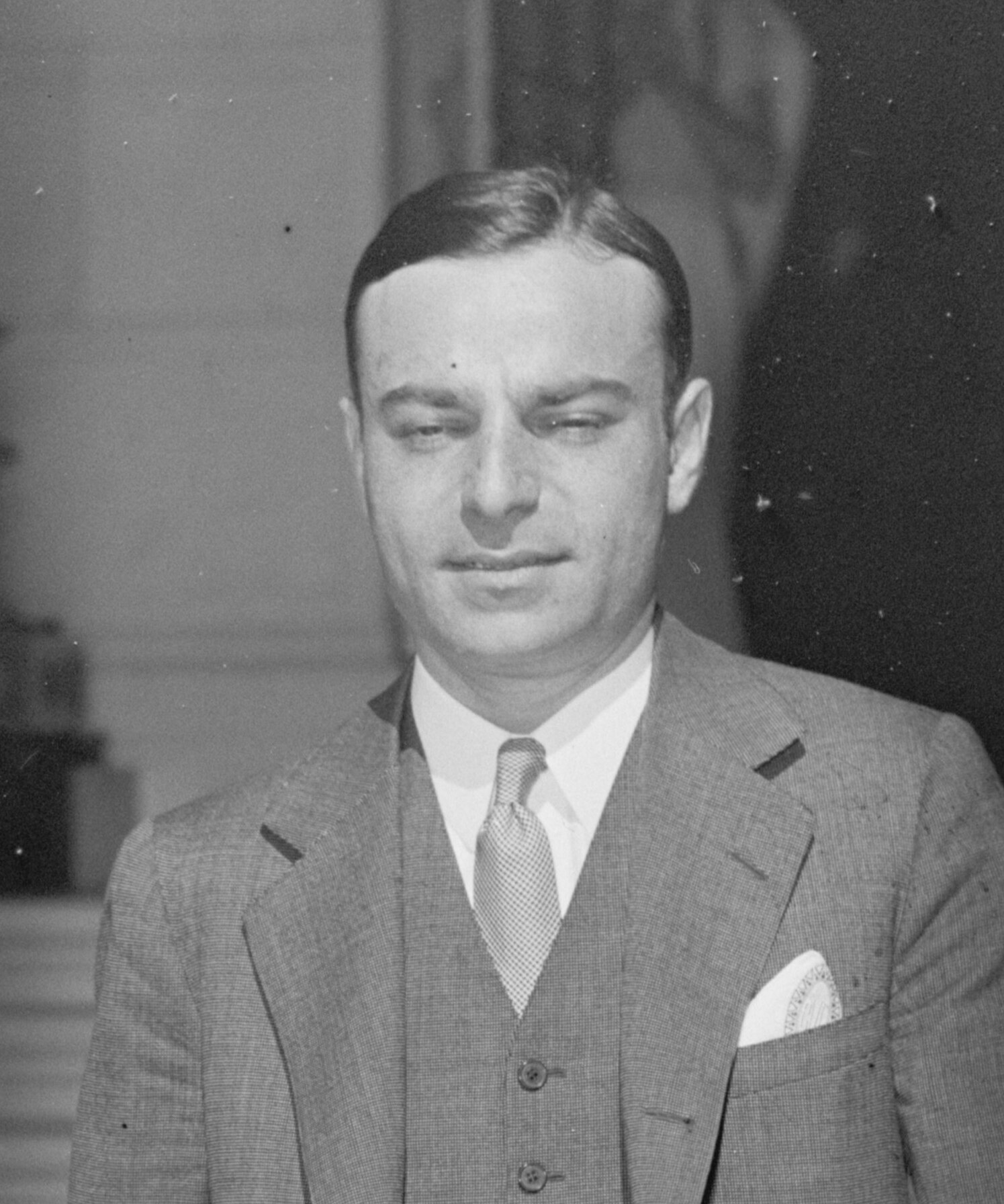
- Wyzanski in 1937 after his defense of the Social Security Act in Steward Machine Co. v. Davis

Senior Judge of the United States District Court for the District of Massachusetts
- In office September 1, 1971 – September 3, 1986

Chief Judge of the United States District Court for the District of Massachusetts
- In office 1965–1971
- Preceded by: George Clinton Sweeney
- Succeeded by: Anthony Julian

Judge of the United States District Court for the District of Massachusetts
- In office December 19, 1941 – September 1, 1971
- Appointed by: Franklin D. Roosevelt
- Preceded by: Hugh Dean McLellan
- Succeeded by: Levin H. Campbell

Personal details
- Born: May 27, 1906 Boston, Massachusetts, U.S.
- Died: September 3, 1986 (aged 80) Boston, Massachusetts, U.S.
- Education: Harvard University (AB, LLB)

Charles Edward Wyzanski Jr. (May 27, 1906 – September 3, 1986) was a United States district judge of the United States District Court for the District of Massachusetts.

== Education and career ==
Born in Boston, Massachusetts, Wyzanski attended Phillips Exeter Academy, and received an Artium Baccalaureus degree from Harvard University in 1927. He received a Bachelor of Laws from Harvard Law School in 1930. He was in private practice of law in Boston in 1930. He was a law clerk for Judge Augustus Noble Hand of the United States Court of Appeals for the Second Circuit from 1930 to 1931. He was in private practice of law in Boston from 1931 to 1932. He was a law clerk for Judge Learned Hand of the Second Circuit in 1932. He was in private practice of law in Boston from 1932 to 1933. He was Solicitor of Labor for the United States Department of Justice in 1933. He was Solicitor of Labor for the United States Department of Labor from 1933 to 1935. He was a special assistant to the Attorney General of the United States in the Office of the Solicitor General from 1935 to 1937. He was in private practice of law in Boston from 1937 to 1941.

== Federal judicial service ==
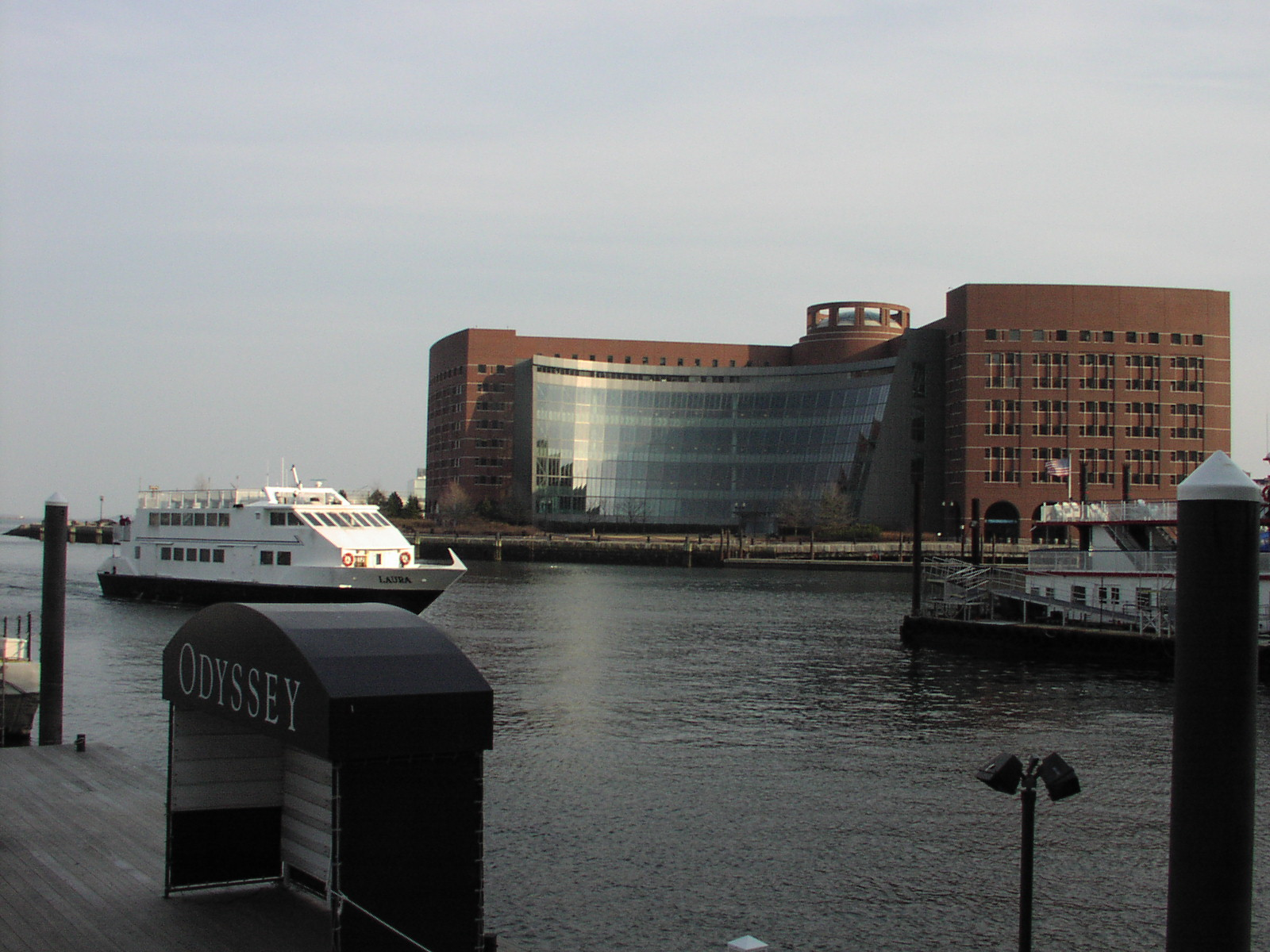
John Joseph Moakley United States Courthouse of the United States District Court for the District of Massachusetts (built 1999)

Wyzanski was recommended by Secretary of Labor Frances Perkins and nominated by President Franklin D. Roosevelt on December 1, 1941, to a seat on the United States District Court for the District of Massachusetts vacated by Judge Hugh Dean McLellan. He was confirmed by the United States Senate on December 16, 1941, and received his commission on December 19, 1941. He served as Chief Judge from 1965 to 1971. He assumed senior status on September 1, 1971. His service was terminated on September 3, 1986, due to his death in Boston.

=== Hiss case ===
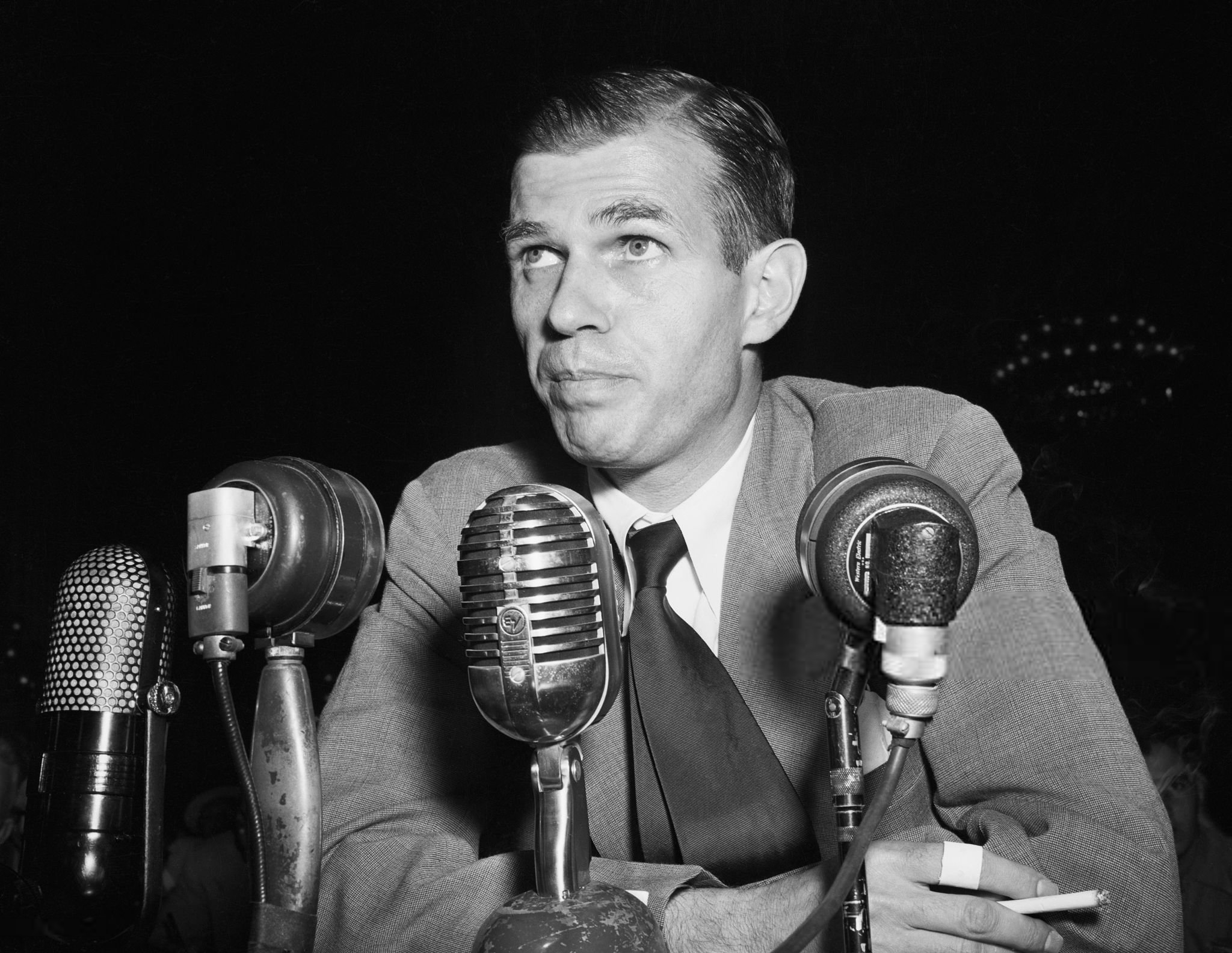
Alger Hiss (1948), Wyzanski's Harvard Law School friend

Wyzanski was a friend of both Alger Hiss and William L. Marbury Jr. Before meeting with Hiss in September 1948 regarding a pending libel suit, Marbury met with Wyzanski, who apprised Marbury that Hiss was receiving advice not to sue Whittaker Chambers.

== Other service ==
Wyzanski was a public member of the National Defense Mediation Board from 1941 to 1942. He was a lecturer in government for Harvard University from 1942 to 1943. He was a lecturer in law for the Massachusetts Institute of Technology from 1949 to 1950. He was a lecturer in law for Stanford University from 1949 to 1951. He was the Herman Phleger Visiting professor of law at Stanford Law School in 1974. He was the Pappas Distinguished Scholar at the Boston University School of Law in 1986.

== Bibliography ==
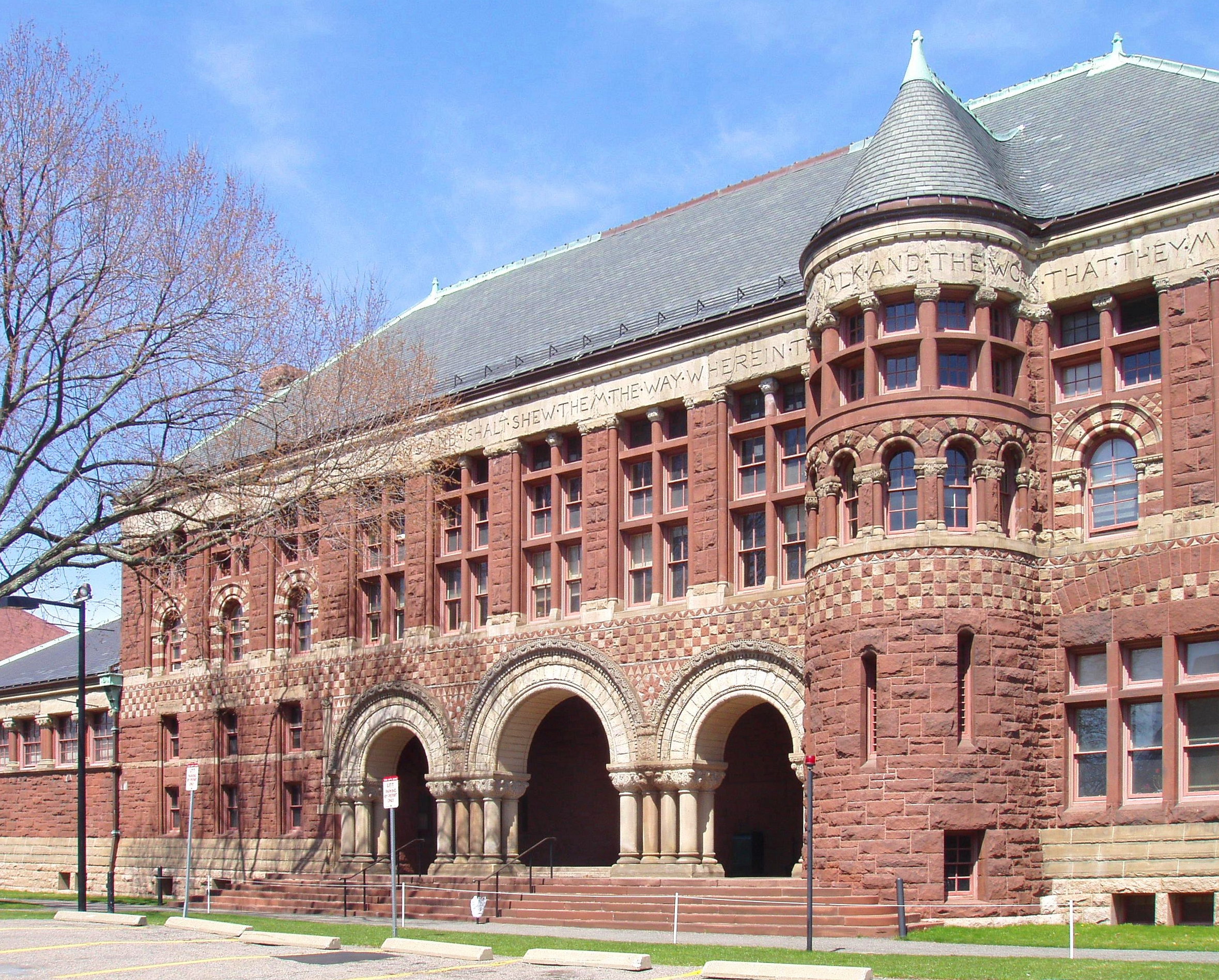
Harvard Law School, where Wyzanski studied and which holds his papers

Wyzanski published the book Whereas--A Judge's Premises : Essays in Judgment, Ethics, and the Law with Little, Brown (1965). The book was republished by Bantam Books in 1966, and retitled The New Meaning of Justice : Essays in Judgment, Ethics, and the Law

== Legacy ==
Harvard Law School Library, Harvard University owns the Wyzanski, Charles E. (Charles Edward). Papers, 1930-1968. The collection is described in the online finding aid as: "The Papers of Charles E. Wyzanski Jr. span the years 1930 to 1968. The Papers consist mainly of correspondence; seventeen items are printed legal briefs, memoranda and other types of legal documents.

Judge Wyzanski's correspondence is with friends and associates and is of a personal-professional nature. It includes both letters received and carbons of letters sent. Many of the people under whom Wyzanski worked, such as United States Court of Appeals Judges Augustus Noble Hand and Learned Hand, or his teachers at the Harvard Law School such as Felix Frankfurter, became close friends of his. Correspondence concerns Wyzanski's professional and personal life, national matters, and Harvard affairs. There are complete sequences of his correspondence with Charles Culp Burlingham, 1934–1959, and Learned Hand, 1932–1961. Originals of his letters to Burlingham and Hand are in the respective Papers of the two men in the Harvard Law School Library.

Among other prominent correspondents were: Bailey Aldrich; Hugo L. Black; Kingman Brewster; Ralph Bunche; McGeorge Bundy; Arthur J. Goldberg; Edward M. Kennedy; Frances Perkins; Nathan M. Pusey; Stanley Forman Reed; Franklin Delano Roosevelt; Leverett Saltonstall; Adlai Stevenson; Earl Warren; and Alfred North Whitehead.

The seventeen printed items (1936–1940), some bound, some unbound, are from Judge Wyzanski's Washington years, particularly from his service as special assistant to the Attorney General of the United States, and on the staff of the Solicitor General of the United States

The group of papers given to the Harvard Law School Library in 1984 relate to the origin of the National Labor Relations Act of 1935; all materials are photocopies.

The unprocessed collection Charles E. Wyzanski papers, ca. 1920-1986 consisting of 34 cartons is now held by the Massachusetts Historical Society in Boston, MA and is currently closed to researchers pending processing. According to the MHS catalog record, the collection is described as "Papers of Judge Charles E. Wyzanski consist of both personal and professional materials. Personal papers include correspondence with family and friends, autobiographical writings, speeches and addresses, articles, and lectures; items pertaining to Harvard University, various foundations, and clubs to which he belonged; and some materials from his school days at Phillips Exeter Academy. Professional papers include legal opinion files, most related to his position as a U.S. Federal appeals judge; notes on cases; articles and clippings; professional correspondence; personnel files; and other administrative papers. Correspondents include Felix Frankfurter, Learned Hand, Augustus Noble Hand, and Henry W. Bragdon, among many others."

Judge Wyzanski was interviewed for the Oral History Project of Columbia University by Harlan Phillips in 1954, entitled "The Reminiscences of Charles E. Wyzanski."

== See also ==
- List of Jewish American jurists
- List of United States federal judges by longevity of service
- National Defense Mediation Board

== External sources ==
Legal offices
Preceded by Hugh Dean McLellan	Judge of the United States District Court for the District of Massachusetts; 1941–1971	Succeeded by Levin H. Campbell
Preceded by George Clinton Sweeney	Chief Judge of the United States District Court for the District of Massachusetts; 1965–1971	Succeeded by Anthony Julian
