= Judge Lowell =

Judge Lowell may refer to:

- Francis Cabot Lowell (judge) (1855–1911), judge of the United States Court of Appeals for the First Circuit
- James Arnold Lowell (1869–1933), judge of the United States District Court for the District of Massachusetts
- John Lowell (1743–1802), judge of the United States Circuit Court for the First Circuit
- John Lowell (judge, 1865–1884) (1824–1897), judge of the United States Circuit Court for the First Circuit
