= Frank Jerome Murray =

American judge

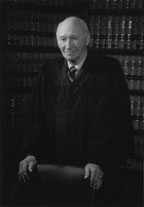

Senior Judge of the United States District Court for the District of Massachusetts
- In office July 15, 1977 – February 12, 1995

Judge of the United States District Court for the District of Massachusetts
- In office April 5, 1967 – July 15, 1977
- Appointed by: Lyndon B. Johnson
- Preceded by: George Clinton Sweeney
- Succeeded by: A. David Mazzone

Personal details
- Born: Frank Jerome Murray; April 6, 1904 Mansfield, Massachusetts, U.S.
- Died: February 12, 1995 (aged 90) Boston, Massachusetts, U.S.
- Education: Georgetown University (BS, LLB)

Frank Jerome Murray (April 6, 1904 – February 12, 1995) was a United States district judge of the United States District Court for the District of Massachusetts.

== Education and career ==
Born in Mansfield, Massachusetts, Murray received a Bachelor of Science degree from Georgetown University in 1925 and a Bachelor of Laws from Georgetown Law in 1929. He was in the United States Army Reserve as a Lieutenant from 1925 to 1935. He was in private practice in Boston, Massachusetts from 1929 to 1938, and was then associate counsel of the New England Agency of the Reconstruction Finance Corporation from 1938 to 1939. He was trial counsel for the Boston Housing Authority from 1939 to 1941. He was assistant corporation counsel for Boston from 1941 to 1943 and corporation counsel from 1943 to 1945. He was again in private practice in Boston from 1945 to 1946. He was a Trustee of the Eastern Massachusetts Street Railway Company from 1945 to 1946. He was an associate justice of the Superior Court of Massachusetts from 1946 to 1967.

== Federal judicial service ==
On February 21, 1967, Murray was nominated by President Lyndon B. Johnson to a seat on the United States District Court for the District of Massachusetts vacated by Judge George Clinton Sweeney. Murray was confirmed by the United States Senate on April 5, 1967, and received his commission the same day. He assumed senior status on July 15, 1977, serving in that capacity until his death on February 12, 1995, in Boston.

== Sources ==
Legal offices
Preceded by Robert H. Hopkins	Boston Corporation Counsel; 1943–1945	Succeeded by James E. Agnew
Preceded by George Clinton Sweeney	Judge of the United States District Court for the District of Massachusetts; 1967–1977	Succeeded by A. David Mazzone
