= Nancy Gertner =

American retired federal judge

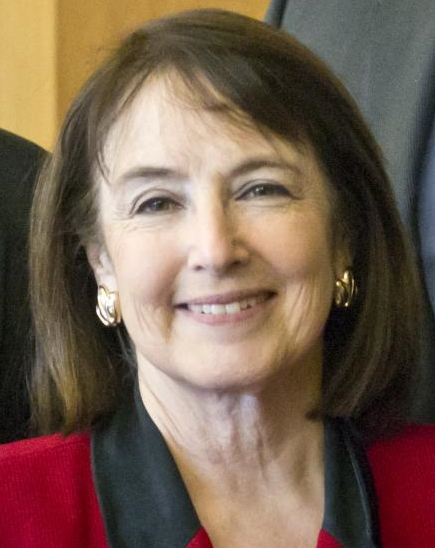
- Gertner in 2012

Senior Judge of the United States District Court for the District of Massachusetts
- In office May 22, 2011 – September 1, 2011

Judge of the United States District Court for the District of Massachusetts
- In office February 14, 1994 – May 22, 2011
- Appointed by: Bill Clinton
- Preceded by: A. David Mazzone
- Succeeded by: Timothy S. Hillman

Personal details
- Born: May 22, 1946 (age 80) New York City, U.S.
- Education: Barnard College (BA); Yale University (MA, JD)

Nancy Gertner (born May 22, 1946) is an American lawyer and jurist who was a United States district judge of the U.S. District Court for the District of Massachusetts from 1994 until retiring in 2011. She is now a professor of practice at Harvard Law School.

== Early life and education ==
Gertner was born in New York City, the granddaughter of Jewish immigrants from Poland and Hungary. Her father, Moishe Gertner, owned a linoleum business; her mother Sadie Gertner was a housewife. Her family lived in a tenement until she was seven years old, when they moved to Flushing, New York. At Flushing High School she was a cheerleader, a member of the staff of her high school's literary magazine, runner-up for homecoming queen, and valedictorian of her class. Gertner received her Bachelor of Arts degree from Barnard College in 1967 and a Master of Arts and a Juris Doctor from Yale University and Yale Law School, respectively, in 1971. While attending Yale, Gertner became friends with Hillary Rodham and met Bill Clinton.

== Career ==
Gertner began her legal career in 1971 as a law clerk for Judge Luther Swygert of the United States Court of Appeals for the Seventh Circuit. Between 1972 and 1994, she practiced law in and around the Greater Boston area with Harvey Silverglate and Thomas Shapiro at Silverglate, Shapiro & Gertner, during which she also taught at Boston University School of Law and was a visiting professor at Harvard Law School. During this period, Gertner was notable for being a supporter of liberalism and feminist ideals, wearing bright red clothes in court, carrying her legal briefs in shopping bags and keeping files on lawyers and judges she felt to be sexist.

== Federal judicial service ==
On October 27, 1993, on the recommendations of Senators Ted Kennedy and John Kerry, Gertner was nominated to the United States District Court for the District of Massachusetts by President Bill Clinton to a seat vacated by A. David Mazzone. Gertner was confirmed by the Senate on February 10, 1994, and received her commission on February 14, 1994. Gertner assumed senior status on May 22, 2011, and retired on September 1, 2011.

== Later career ==
After retiring from the bench, Gertner was appointed a Professor of Practice at Harvard Law School. She was named a member of the Presidential Commission on the Supreme Court of the United States by President Joe Biden on April 9, 2021.

== Notable cases ==
Gertner ruled in U.S. v. Hines, 55 F.Supp. 2d 62 (D.Mass. 1999), a case regarding the admissibility of expert testimony, that (i) a handwriting expert could testify to similarities between handwriting samples but not state an opinion about whether the same person wrote both notes, and (ii) expert witness testimony regarding the reliability of eyewitness testimony, including problems of cross-racial identification, was admissible. The case interpreted new admissibility standards for expert testimony set forth by the Supreme Court in Daubert v. Merrell Dow Pharmaceuticals, 509 U.S. 579 (1993) and Kumho Tire Co. v. Carmichael, 526 U.S. 137 (1999).

On July 26, 2007, she ordered the federal government to pay a record $101.7 million for withholding evidence that could have exculpated four men wrongfully convicted of murder. The men had been falsely accused by mob hitman Joseph "The Animal" Barboza, with the help of corrupt FBI agent H. Paul Rico. The government appealed the award, which was upheld in 2009 by the U.S. Court of Appeals for the First Circuit.

Judge Gertner presided over Sony BMG v. Tenenbaum, a civil trial in which the Recording Industry Association of America accused Joel Tenenbaum, a Massachusetts college student, of illegally downloading and sharing files, thus violating U.S. copyright law. In July 2009, a jury awarded $675,000 to the music companies, but Judge Gertner later reduced the award to $67,500, stating that arbitrarily high statutory damages violate due process and are thus unconstitutional. After both parties appealed, the First Circuit Court of Appeals reinstated the original damage award of $675,000 and remanded the case to the District Court, ruling that the judge should have avoided the constitutional issue by first considering remittitur. The Supreme Court refused to hear Tenenbaum's appeal arguing against the remand. A new District Court judge then found no cause for remittitur, and held that the statutory damage award was constitutional. Tenenbaum again appealed to the First Circuit, which in June 2013 upheld the award.

As a defense attorney, she defended Brandeis University student activist and fugitive Susan Saxe in her trial for the murder of Boston Police Department officer Walter Schroeder. Gertner describes the Saxe trial as her first big case.

Sean Hannity, Rush Limbaugh, Alan Dershowitz and others have asserted that Robert Mueller was responsible for the improper imprisonment of four men when he was a federal prosecutor in Boston during the 1980s. In an opinion piece entitled "Smearing Robert Mueller", Gertner, who presided over the matter, wrote "[t]he record simply doesn't support these assertions".

== Personal life ==
Gertner is to date the only Massachusetts judge to post to a personal blog. Though this has resulted in some criticism, Gertner maintains that judges are often too silent on issues they should publicly address.

Gertner published her memoirs, In Defense of Women: Memoirs of an Unrepentant Advocate, in 2011. The book focuses on the period during which she worked as a criminal defense and civil rights lawyer before joining the Federal bench in 1994.

Gertner is the widow of John Reinstein, former Legal Director for the Massachusetts ACLU.

In October 2015, Gertner became the subject of media attention in the Boston area when an escaped cockatoo did considerable damage to her Brookline residence, a historic Victorian home which also happened to be the birthplace of Robert F. Kennedy. After eluding capture for several months, the bird was caught on October 22.

== Awards ==
- 2008 Thurgood Marshall Award of the American Bar Association, recognizing Gertner's contributions to advancing human rights and civil liberties.
- 2014 Margaret Brent Women Lawyers of Achievement Award of the American Bar Association, recognizing Gertner's advocacy, mentoring and achievements in the legal field.

== See also ==
- List of Jewish American jurists

== Sources ==
- Nancy Gertner, In Defense of Women: Memoirs of an Unrepentant Advocate (Boston: Beacon Press, 2011)

Legal offices
Preceded by A. David Mazzone	Judge of the United States District Court for the District of Massachusetts; 1994–2011	Succeeded by Timothy S. Hillman
