= No-fault insurance =

Insurance contract type

No-fault insurance is any type of insurance contract under which the insured party is indemnified by their own insurance company for losses, regardless of the source of the cause of loss. In this sense, it is similar to first-party coverage. The term "no-fault" is most commonly used in the United States, Australia, and Canada when referring to state or provincial automobile insurance laws where a policyholder and their passengers are reimbursed by the policyholder's own insurance company without proof of fault, and are restricted in their right to seek recovery through the civil-justice system for losses caused by other parties. No-fault insurance has the goal of lowering premium costs by avoiding expensive litigation over the causes of the collision, while providing quick payments for injuries or loss of property.

However, there are other forms of no-fault insurance. For example, in the United States, most workers' compensation funds typically are run as no-fault systems. This is supposed to simplify the injured worker's claim, since they do not need to prove that someone's negligence caused their illness or injuries.

== Description ==
=== Motor vehicle insurance ===
No-fault systems generally exempt or severely limit individuals from the usual liability for causing bodily injury if they do so in a car collision; when individuals purchase "liability" insurance under those regimes, the insurance covers bodily injury to the insured party and their passengers in a car collision, regardless of which party would be liable under ordinary legal tort rules. Some no-fault systems often grant "set" or "fixed" compensation for certain injuries regardless of the unique aspects of the injury or the injured party, but this is not universally true.

==== Proponents of no-fault insurance ====
Proponents of no-fault insurance argue that automobile collisions are inevitable and that at-fault drivers are not necessarily higher risk and should not necessarily be punished. Moreover, they note that the presence of liability insurance insulates reckless or negligent drivers from financial disincentives of litigation. Uninsured motorists often can't and won't end up paying for their liability, so in regions with many uninsured motorists, no-fault systems may make more sense.

==== Critics of no-fault insurance ====
Critics of no-fault insurance argue that dangerous drivers not paying for the damage they cause encourages risky behavior, with only raised premiums and a higher risk rating as the potential consequence, and no jury awards or legal settlements.

In regions where no-fault insurance has been introduced, protesters have raised concerns about the loss of legal rights and limits on compensation. For example, in British Columbia, rallies were held in Vancouver and Victoria following ICBC's transition to its Enhanced Care model, with opponents arguing that removing most lawsuit rights leaves seriously injured victims without meaningful legal recourse.

Detractors of no-fault insurance also point out that legitimate victims with subtle handicaps find it difficult to seek recovery. Another criticism is that some no-fault jurisdictions have among the highest automobile-insurance premiums in the country, but this may be more a matter of effect than cause: the financial savings from no-fault may simply make it more popular in areas with higher automobile-collision risk, or high insurance rates may cause more drivers to go uninsured, increasing the attraction of a no-fault system.

Another criticism of No-Fault is the higher incidence of auto insurance fraud. When analyzing the number of cases of fraud by medical providers and personal injury lawyers in the U.S., states that mandate No-Fault insurance have fraud rates that are higher than other traditional tort states.

== Origins ==
The number of traffic collisions causing fatalities and debilitating injuries had become by the mid-1960s the source of a litigation explosion that was "straining (and in some areas overwhelming) the judicial machinery." Much legal thinking in academia was devoted to the question of whether the tort system should be replaced with another method of allocating risks of loss from collisions. Empirical analyses were published showing the financial impact of automobile collisions. The first comprehensive legislative proposal was put forward by Professors Robert E. Keeton of Harvard Law School and Jeffrey O'Connell, then of the University of Illinois, in a law review article published in the Harvard Law Review, which consisted of two chapters of the book that they would publish the following year. The Keeton-O'Connell plan provided that all automobile owners would be required to purchase a new form of insurance, called "basic protection coverage," under which a victim has recourse for his net economic loss against the insurer of his own car, his host's car or, if the victim is a pedestrian, any car involved. Fault is not required to be shown except for of damages in excess of $10,000 for bodily injury, the deductible of $100 for bodily injury and property damage. Recoverable loss under this type of policy does not include pain and suffering and is reduced by damages recovered from other sources. The proposal generated immense discussion in legal and insurance publications with some concluding it was too "revolutionary."

In 1967 Massachusetts state representative Michael Dukakis, a 1960 graduate of Harvard Law School, introduced a modified version of the Keeton-O'Connell plan in the Massachusetts legislature. The scheme was adopted in 1970. The law was challenged in court for claimed violations of numerous state and federal constitutional provisions. The scheme was defended by the state attorney general and also Harvard Law School professors Archibald Cox and Philip Heymann in an amicus curiae brief. The Supreme Judicial Court of Massachusetts overruled the objections in a unanimous decision. The decision opened the way for widespread adoption of no-fault automobile insurance schemes, a development that was encouraged by the federal Department of Transportation.

== Overview in United States ==
Most US states have a "traditional tort" liability system for auto insurance in which recovery is governed by principles of provable negligence. However, twelve U.S. states and the Commonwealth territory of Puerto Rico require policyholders to operate under a "no-fault" scheme in which individuals injured in automobile collisions are limited in their ability to seek recovery from other drivers or vehicle owners involved in a collision. An additional eight states have an "add-on" system in which the insured party retains the right to sue. In 2012, RAND Corporation published a study which found that costs were higher in no-fault systems. In the case of economic (medical and wage-loss) damages, most no-fault systems permit injured parties to seek recovery only for damages that are not covered by available first-party insurance benefits. In the case of non-economic (pain and suffering) damages, most no-fault systems permit injured parties to seek compensation only in cases of "exceptionally serious" injury, which can be defined in either of two ways:

- A quantitative monetary threshold that sets a specific amount that must be spent on medical bills before a tort is allowed. Disadvantages of this threshold are: (1) that it can encourage insured parties (and their medical providers) to exaggerate medical costs through over-utilization, and (2) that, unless indexed, it can become ineffective over time because of inflationary effects on medical costs.
- A qualitative verbal threshold that states what categories of injuries are considered sufficiently serious to permit a tort (e.g., death, or permanent disability or disfigurement). The advantage of the verbal threshold is that it removes any incentive to inflate damage amounts artificially to meet some preset monetary loss figure. The primary disadvantage is that seriously injured claimants may be barred from compensation where their injury does not match their state's threshold definition language.

In terms of damages to vehicles and their contents, those claims are still based on fault. No-fault systems focus solely on issues of compensation for bodily injury, and such policies pay the medical bills for drivers and their companions no matter whose fault the collision was.

In three U.S. states – Kentucky, New Jersey, and Pennsylvania – policyholders are permitted to choose between traditional tort and no-fault recovery regimes. Under such systems, known as "choice" or "optional" no-fault, policyholders must select between "full tort" and "limited tort" (no-fault) options at the time the policy is written or renewed; once the policy terms are set forth an insured party may not change his/her mind without rewriting the policy. In Kentucky and New Jersey, policyholders who do not make an affirmative choice in favor of either full tort or limited tort are assigned the no-fault option, while in Pennsylvania the full-tort option is the default.

Twenty four states originally enacted no-fault laws in some form between 1970 and 1975; most of them have repealed their no-fault laws over time. Colorado repealed its no-fault system in 2003. Florida's no-fault system sunsetted on 1 October 2007, but the Florida legislature passed a new no-fault law which took effect 1 January 2008. As of 2026, only nine states have true No-Fault systems with three others having some form of hybrid system.

=== Michigan ===
Michigan's no-fault system is relatively uncommon. Before 2019, drivers had to purchase personal injury protection insurance that included unlimited, lifetime medical coverage. While this system protected people with catastrophic injuries, many consumers complained about the high insurance premiums associated with this system.

In 2019, the Michigan Legislature changed the state's no-fault auto insurance law so that drivers will no longer be required to purchase unlimited medical coverage. Instead, under the PIP Choice system that was enacted, drivers have the choice of selecting medical coverage with limits of $50,000 (for drivers on Medicaid), $250,000, $500,000 and unlimited. Drivers on Medicare may be eligible to forgo all No-Fault medical coverage.

The goal of the no-fault changes was to lower premiums for drivers and, thus, make car insurance more affordable. However, Michigan's average annual auto insurance rates are still the highest in the country - and Detroit has the highest rates of any city in the US. Additionally, Michigan's no-fault reforms reduced compensation to some caregivers, which made it somewhat more difficult for a few catastrophically injured crash victims to access care from their own auto insurance policy, without having to file a lawsuit to get a liability claim from other drivers involved in their crash. In many of those cases, health insurance also covers the care of crash victims if auto insurance is either not existent or does not have enough coverage to pay claims.

In addition to loosening its coverage rules and changing compensation for caregivers, the 2019 laws also made widespread changes to medical reimbursement rates, commonly referred to as the "fee schedules." The law did not expressly address whether the new few schedules should be applied retroactively. In 2019, a group of stakeholders filed a lawsuit, arguing that the 2019 no-fault law's fee schedule should not be applied retroactively. Attorneys have argued that the failure to include a "grandfather clause" in the 2019 law "punishes car accident victims and medical providers by leaving them subject to restrictions they never agreed to such as coverage limitations and a medical fee schedule whose reductions on reimbursement rates will deny them access to necessary medical care and treatment." In 2023, the Michigan Supreme Court ruled that the fee cuts for providers do not apply retroactively.

=== New York ===
New York is one of several states with a comprehensive no-fault automobile insurance system, codified in the state's Insurance Law Article 51. Under this system, motorists are required to carry personal injury protection (PIP) coverage, which pays for medical expenses, lost wages, and other reasonable and necessary costs regardless of who caused the accident. The law generally limits the right to sue for non-economic damages, except in cases involving a "serious injury" as defined by statute, such as significant disfigurement, fracture, or permanent limitation of use of a body organ or member. Claims for no-fault benefits must typically be filed within 30 days of the accident.

== US states and Canadian provinces and Territories with no-fault laws ==
- Pure no-fault
  - Manitoba
  - British Columbia
  - Alberta (transitioning from January, 1 2027)
- Qualitative threshold
  - Delaware
  - Florida
  - Hawaii
  - Kansas
  - Kentucky
  - Michigan
  - Minnesota
  - New Jersey
  - New York
  - North Dakota
  - Ontario
  - Pennsylvania
  - Quebec (only for bodily injury suffered in automobile collisions)
- Quantitative threshold
  - Kansas ($2000 Threshold)
  - Kentucky ($1000 Threshold)
  - Massachusetts ($2000 Threshold)
  - Minnesota ($4000 Threshold)
  - North Dakota ($2500 Threshold)
  - Saskatchewan ($90,000 threshold)
  - Utah ($3000 Threshold)
- Choice no-fault
  - Kentucky
  - New Jersey
  - Saskatchewan

== See also ==
- Accident Compensation Corporation in New Zealand
- Transport Accident Commission in Victoria, Australia
- No-fault liability
