= Introdacqua =

- Comune
- Comune di Introdacqua
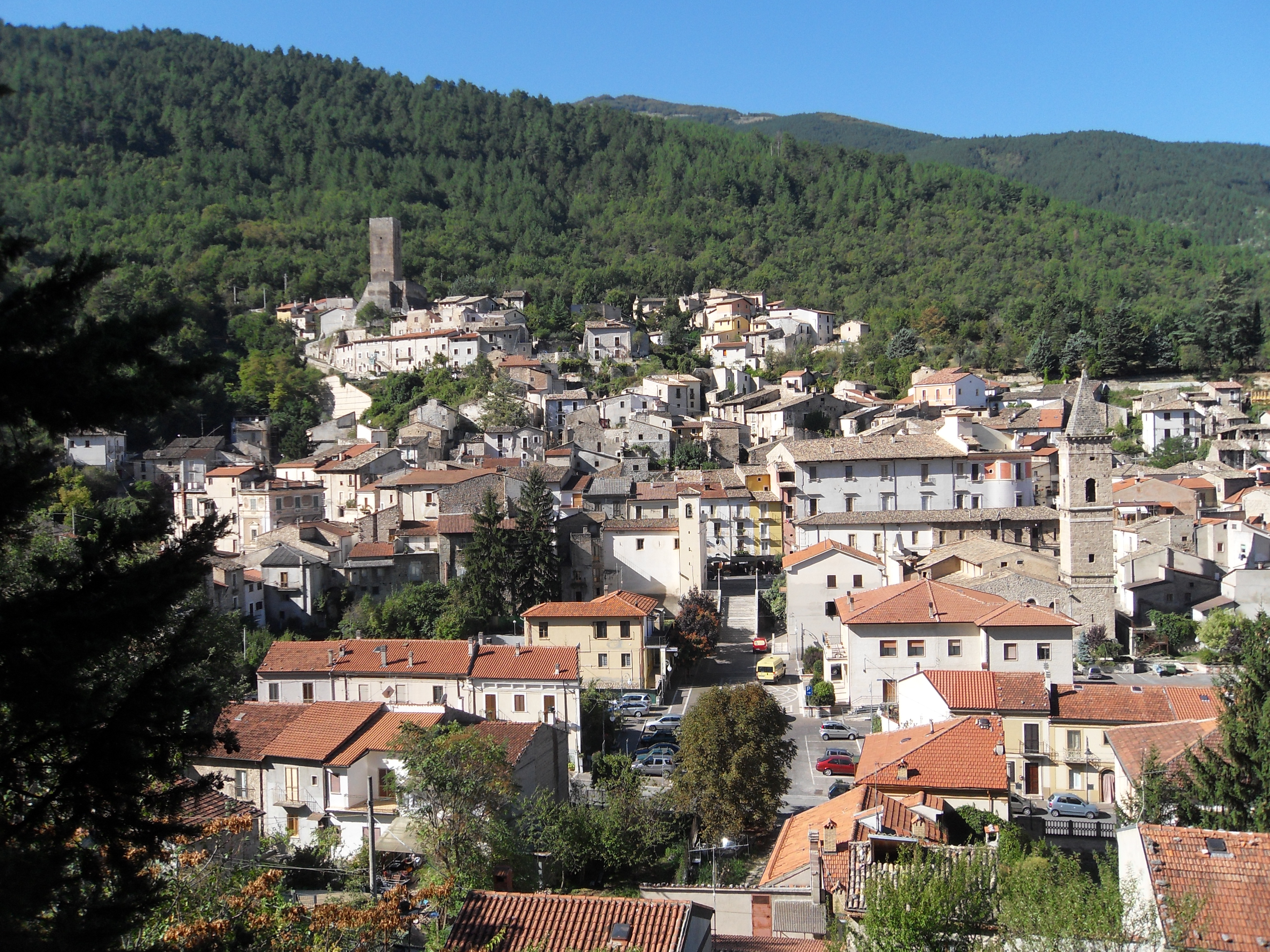

- Location within Italy Location within Abruzzo
- Coordinates: 42°0′30″N 13°53′57″E
- Country: Italy
- Region: Abruzzo
- Province: L'Aquila (AQ)
- Frazioni: Cantone, Cauze, Mastroiacovo, Pannate, Santa Maria Frascati

Area
  - Total: 36.97 km^{2} (14.27 sq mi)
- Elevation: 642 m (2,106 ft)

Population (31 December 2013)
  - Total: 2,115
  - Density: 57.21/km^{2} (148.2/sq mi)
- Demonym: Introdacquesi
- Time zone: UTC+1 (CET)
  - Summer (DST): UTC+2 (CEST)
- Postal code: 67030
- Dialing code: 0864
- ISTAT code: 066048
- Patron saint: San Feliciano
- Saint day: 21 August

Introdacqua is a comune and town in the Province of L'Aquila in the Abruzzo region of Italy.

Introdacqua is part of Valle Peligna although it is set between Contra and S. Antonio Valleys.

== History ==
The name Introdacqua draws from inter aquas, a Latin expression for "inside the waters", due to the water abundance in the territory. The Lombards founded Introdacqua in the 9th century and the city grew over time. The 14th century was consequential for the town, when the Medici family controlled the region and construction flourished. During medieval times, the city also fell under the Trasmondi family. By the 19th century, wool and silk were central to local business. The city experienced earthquakes in 1654, 1703, 1704, 1706, and 1915. According to Rizalie Valera, "Today, the town is a charming blend of old and new, with ancient buildings and narrow streets coexisting alongside modern shops and cafes."

== Geography ==
Introdacqua is built among hills and mountains in the Abruzzo region. It is situated between the di Contra and Sant'Antonio valleys near Sulmona. Various hiking trails span the surrounding area.

== Cityscape ==
Notable structures include the city's castle dating from the 1200s, as well as the Church of Santa Maria Maggiore. The main church was built between 1474 and around 1510. A mansion called the Palazzo del Barone was built in the 1400s which is today open to the public accompanied by a museum. The Palazzo Trasmondi is another notable structure. A Jewish quarter with synagogues remains in the city, dating from the 1500s.

== Demographics ==
As of 2024, Introdacqua had 1,700 residents.

== Notable people ==
Ilio DiPaolo (1926-1995) - professional wrestler
