= Robert Rehder =

American poet

Robert McConkie Rehder
- Born: Robert Mertens Rehder; 1935; Iowa City, Iowa, USA
- Died: April 6, 2009 (aged 73–74); Oxford, England, UK
- Occupations: Author; poet; translator; professor

Robert McConkie Rehder (1935 - April 6, 2009) was an American poet and literary scholar. He authored two books of poetry and several scholarly volumes. A posthumous volume of poetry, I'm back and still returning, was published by Poetry Salzburg in October 2016. Rehder was professor of English and American literature at the University of Fribourg, Switzerland. He lived for many years in Corminboeuf in French-speaking Switzerland. In his poetry he treated the small village as a center of cultural life.

== Biography ==
Robert Rehder was born in Iowa City, Iowa, in 1935. He was the first son of Theodore Marten Rehder (1908–1991) and Alyce Marguerite ("Marge") McConkie Rehder (1907–1974). Theodore Rehder was the first director of Dormitories and Dining Services at the University of Iowa, serving from 1929 to 1976. Robert and his brother Richard (1938–2005) attended University High School on the State University of Iowa campus. Robert graduated in 1953.

Robert Rehder matriculated at Princeton University in 1953. In 1954 he won the Morris W. Croll Poetry Prize, and in 1957 the Academy of American Poets Prize. He graduated in 1957 with a Bachelor of Arts in Near Eastern Studies. His brother Richard also graduated from Princeton, with highest honors in mathematics. Richard went on to work in the Navy Space program as a mathematician.

After graduation, Rehder studied at the Ecole des langues orientales in Paris, France on a Rotary Grant and then at the University of Tehran, where he also taught English grammar. He returned to Princeton, completing his doctorate in Oriental languages and literature in 1970. His dissertation is titled "Hafiz: An Introduction." According to Princeton Alumni Weekly, Rehder "claimed to be the first to make a scientific collection of plants for Kew Gardens from the big deserts of eastern Iran." He lived for about two years in Tehran, during which time he traveled to Afghanistan and across Turkey. In Iran, he crossed the Dasht-e Kavir and Dasht-e Lut deserts. The Ted Rehder Papers at the University of Iowa Archives contain correspondence between Robert Rehder and his parents during Robert's years in Switzerland and his stay in Tehran.

One of his publishers, Carcanet Press, reports that, prior to his professional teaching career, Rehder "worked as a checkroom attendant, private dining-room waiter, painter, busboy, gardener, picked apples, polished silver, [...] and [taught] ice-skating in a nursery school." He taught English composition at Princeton University. He taught at the University of Wisconsin-Madison and at the University of Stirling in Scotland, before finding a position at the University of Fribourg in 1985. He was a visiting professor of Near Eastern studies at Princeton.

The little magazine The Poet's Voice published a Robert Rehder section in issue 5.1 (1998/1999). It contains a long interview (conducted by co-editor Wolfgang Görtschacher), essays by Peter Porter and Tom Artin, and a substantial selection of poems. Porter characterizes Rehder as being "passionate about the mind as the supreme organ of feeling," noting that "his verse is almost a liturgy of insight. His diction is strikingly up-to-date in the serious sense. His wit has a forensic edge: he is always intelligent but shatters common expectation. […] There is no substitute for reading Rehder over and over again – the poems are too clear to be understood at once. And they shine too brightly.” Artin stresses that “Rehder is fond of spinning out into a poem the details of some incident that must strike the reader as trivial […] tracing the ramifications meticulously, methodically, bearing down on each fact until the trivial resonates with the stellar – daily life telescoping into the big bang.”

Rehder's early scholarly and literary work included free verse translations of the 14th-century Persian poet Hafiz. This work was published in 1974 as “The Unity of the Ghazals of Hafiz.” He published books on Wordsworth, Wallace Stevens, William Carlos Williams, and Stephen Crane. At the time of his death he was working on his third volume of poetry.

In 2005, Anthony Mortimer edited a Festschrift for Robert Rehder, From Wordsworth to Stevens: Essays in Honor of Robert Rehder (Bern: Peter Lang AG). The volume, with essays by sixteen international scholars and poets, honors his classroom teaching and his substantial scholarship in the history of modern poetry.

Robert Rehder died of a heart attack April 6, 2009, in Oxford, England, where he had been teaching American literature at Oxford University since his retirement.

In October 2016 Poetry Salzburg published the posthumous volume of poetry I'm back and still returning. Görtschacher edited the volume, which is based on a manuscript that Rehder had assembled for publication in early 2009.

== Bibliography ==
=== Poetry ===
- The Compromises Will Be Different (Carcanet Press 1995) ISBN 978-1-857-54127-4
- The Poetry of Robert Rehder, a Selection, Jane Maher, ed. (Privately printed pamphlet [28 p] 2003)
- First Things When (Carcanet Press 2009) ISBN 978-1-857-54909-6
- I'm back and still returning, Wolfgang Görtschacher, ed. (Poetry Salzburg 2016) ISBN 978-3-901-99354-1

=== Scholarship ===
- King Lear York Notes (Longman 1980)
- Wordsworth and the Beginnings of Modern Poetry (Croom Helm Ltd. 1981)
- The Poetry of Wallace Stevens (Palgrave Macmillan 1988)
- Imprints and Re-Visions: The Making of the Literary Text 1759-1818, Editor (with Peter Hughes) (Gunter Narr 1996)
- From Rousseau to Wordsworth: What Happened in European Literature between 1770 and 1850, Editor (Peter Lang 1997)
- A Narrative of the Life of Mrs. Charlotte Charke, Editor. (Pickering & Chatto Publishers 1999)
- Stevens, Williams, Crane and the Motive for Metaphor (Palgrave Macmillan 2005)

=== Translations and anthologies ===
- “The Unity of the Ghazals of Hafiz,” Der Islam 51, 1974, pp. 55–96.
- American Poetry: Whitman to the Present, Robert Rehder and Patrick Vincent, eds. (Gunter Narr 2006)

== Awards ==
- The Morris W. Croll Poetry Prize (1955), Princeton University
- The Academy of American Poets Prize (1957), Princeton University
