= Timothy S. Hillman =

American judge (born 1948)

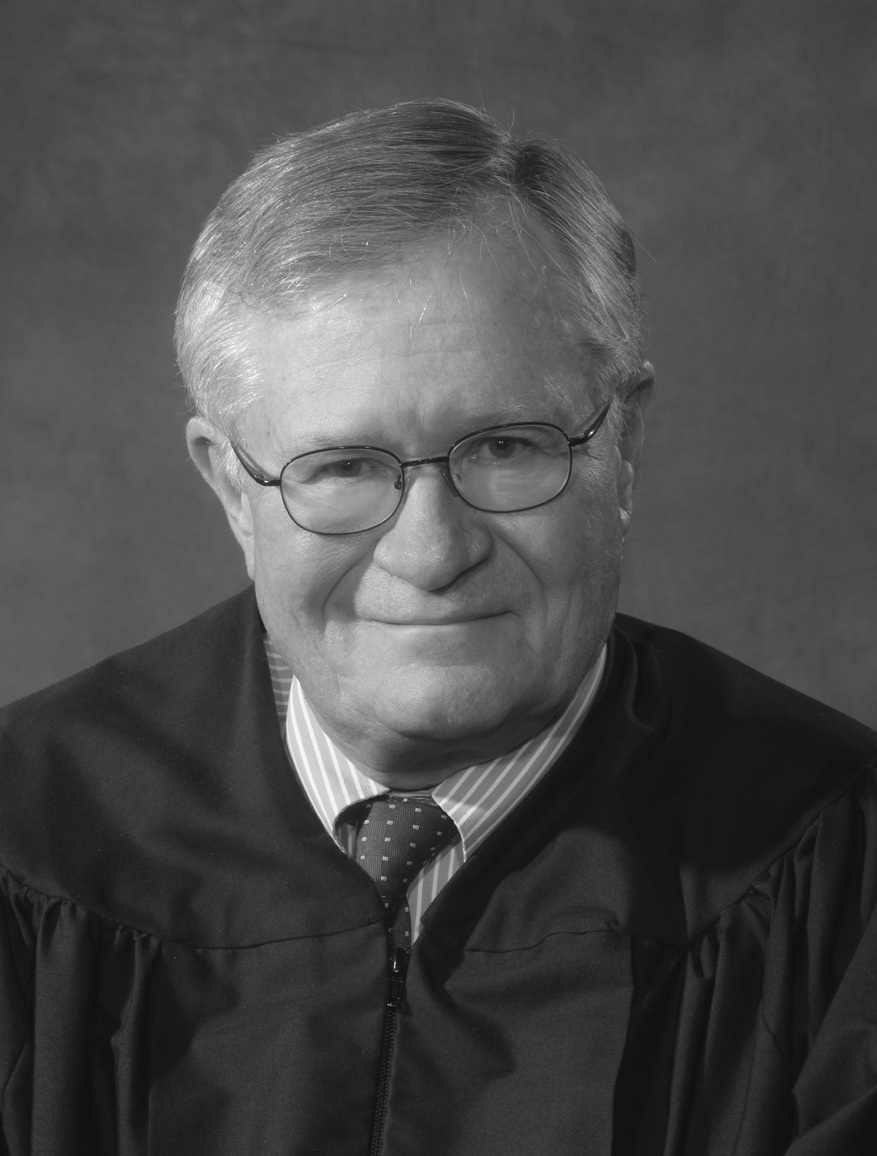
- Hillman in 2013

Senior Judge of the United States District Court for the District of Massachusetts
- In office July 1, 2022 – July 25, 2024

Judge of the United States District Court for the District of Massachusetts
- In office June 6, 2012 – July 1, 2022
- Appointed by: Barack Obama
- Preceded by: Nancy Gertner
- Succeeded by: Margaret R. Guzman

Magistrate Judge of the United States District Court for the District of Massachusetts
- In office 2006 – June 6, 2012

Personal details
- Born: Timothy Spafard Hillman; March 13, 1948 (age 78) Chicago, Illinois, U.S.
- Education: Coe College (BA); Suffolk University (JD)

Timothy Spafard Hillman (born March 13, 1948) is a former United States district judge of the United States District Court for the District of Massachusetts.

== Biography ==
Hillman was born in 1948 in Chicago, Illinois. He received his Bachelor of Arts degree in 1970 from Coe College in Cedar Rapids, Iowa. He received his Juris Doctor in 1973 from Suffolk University Law School in Boston. After spending over a decade in private practice, he served as City Solicitor to the cities of Fitchburg and Gardner and as Town Counsel to the towns of Athol, Lunenburg and Petersham, all located in Massachusetts. He served as a Justice of the Massachusetts District Court from 1991 to 1998 and as a Justice of the Massachusetts Superior Court from 1998 to 2006. He served as a United States magistrate judge of the United States District Court for the District of Massachusetts from 2006 until 2012.

=== Federal judicial service ===
On November 30, 2011, President Barack Obama nominated Hillman to be District Judge for the United States District Court for the District of Massachusetts. President Obama nominated Hillman to the seat vacated by Judge Nancy Gertner, who retired in 2011. On February 15, 2012, he received a hearing before the Senate Judiciary Committee. On March 8, 2012, the Judiciary Committee reported his nomination to the floor of the Senate by a 17–1 vote, with Senator Mike Lee casting the only no vote. The Senate confirmed Hillman's nomination on June 4, 2012 by an 88–1 vote, with Senator Mike Lee again casting the sole no vote. Hillman received his judicial commission on June 6, 2012. He assumed senior status on July 1, 2022. He retired from active service on July 25, 2024.

Legal offices
Preceded by Nancy Gertner	Judge of the United States District Court for the District of Massachusetts; 2012–2022	Succeeded by Margaret R. Guzman
