= Bailey Aldrich =

American judge (1907–2002)

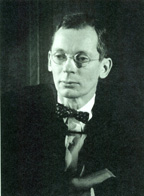

Senior Judge of the United States Court of Appeals for the First Circuit
- In office August 31, 1972 – September 25, 2002

Chief Judge of the United States Court of Appeals for the First Circuit
- In office 1965–1972
- Preceded by: Peter Woodbury
- Succeeded by: Frank M. Coffin

Judge of the United States Court of Appeals for the First Circuit
- In office September 10, 1959 – August 31, 1972
- Appointed by: Dwight D. Eisenhower
- Preceded by: Calvert Magruder
- Succeeded by: Levin H. Campbell

Judge of the United States District Court for the District of Massachusetts
- In office April 27, 1954 – September 14, 1959
- Appointed by: Dwight D. Eisenhower
- Preceded by: Seat established by 68 Stat. 8
- Succeeded by: Anthony Julian

Personal details
- Born: Bailey Aldrich; April 23, 1907 Boston, Massachusetts, U.S.
- Died: September 25, 2002 (aged 95) Cambridge, Massachusetts, U.S.
- Education: Harvard University (AB, LLB)

Bailey Aldrich (April 23, 1907 – September 25, 2002) was a United States circuit judge of the United States Court of Appeals for the First Circuit and previously was a United States District Judge of the United States District Court for the District of Massachusetts.

== Education and career ==
A native of Boston, Massachusetts, Aldrich graduated from Harvard University with an Artium Baccalaureus degree in 1928 and Harvard Law School with a Bachelor of Laws in 1932. He was elected a Fellow of the American Academy of Arts and Sciences in 1954. Aldrich was in private practice in Boston from 1932 to 1954.

== Federal judicial service ==
Aldrich was nominated by President Dwight D. Eisenhower on April 1, 1954, to the United States District Court for the District of Massachusetts, to a new seat authorized by 68 Stat. 8. He was confirmed by the United States Senate on April 23, 1954, and received his commission on April 27, 1954. His service terminated on September 14, 1959, due to his elevation to the First Circuit.

Aldrich was nominated by President Eisenhower on February 26, 1959, to a seat on the United States Court of Appeals for the First Circuit vacated by Judge Calvert Magruder. He was confirmed by the Senate on September 9, 1959, and received his commission the next day. He served as Chief Judge and as a member of the Judicial Conference of the United States from 1965 to 1972. He assumed senior status on August 31, 1972. His service terminated on September 25, 2002, due to his death in Cambridge, Massachusetts.

=== Conflict with Senator McCarthy ===
According to Ted Morgan in Reds: McCarthyism in Twentieth-Century America, Judge Aldrich drew the ire of Senator Joseph McCarthy in 1955, when Aldrich dismissed contempt of Congress charges against Leon J. Kamin. In February 1956, McCarthy wrote to complain to President Eisenhower, accusing Judge Aldrich of harboring sympathy toward Communists. He had learned from the New Bedford Standard-Times that Aldrich had initially refused, on principle, to sign a non-Communist affidavit card upon his appointment as a trustee to the Massachusetts Memorial Hospital. Massachusetts Governor Christian Herter had nominated him for the trusteeship on August 2, 1955, two months before the Kamin trial. According to Morgan, the judge wrote that he "would rather forgo the post on the hospital board than sign the card." He finally did sign the card on September 13, "after being told that failure to comply would cause great embarrassment to the Herter administration," but McCarthy was not satisfied by the news that Aldrich had eventually complied. President Eisenhower ignored McCarthy's complaint.

== Personal ==
Aldrich married Elizabeth Perkins, who had studied at the Buckingham School and Bryn Mawr College. Elizabeth was an editor. American philosopher Ralph Barton Perry credits Elizabeth Perkins Aldrich as a de facto co-author of his Pulitzer Prize-winning biography The Thought and Character of William James. Bailey and Elizabeth Aldrich had two sons: David and the poet Jonathan Aldrich. Aldrich was the grandson of 19th century author Thomas Bailey Aldrich.

== Bibliography ==
- Cohen, Kenneth A. "Bailey Aldrich and the Modern First Circuit: Old Virtues and New Civil Liberties." Massachusetts Law Review 74 (December 1989): 247-55.

== See also ==
- List of United States federal judges by longevity of service

Legal offices
Preceded by Seat established by 68 Stat. 8	Judge of the United States District Court for the District of Massachusetts; 1954–1959	Succeeded by Anthony Julian
Preceded by Calvert Magruder	Judge of the United States Court of Appeals for the First Circuit; 1959–1972	Succeeded by Levin H. Campbell
Preceded by Peter Woodbury	Chief Judge of the United States Court of Appeals for the First Circuit; 1965–1972	Succeeded by Frank M. Coffin
