= Levin H. Campbell =

American judge (born 1927)

Levin Campbell
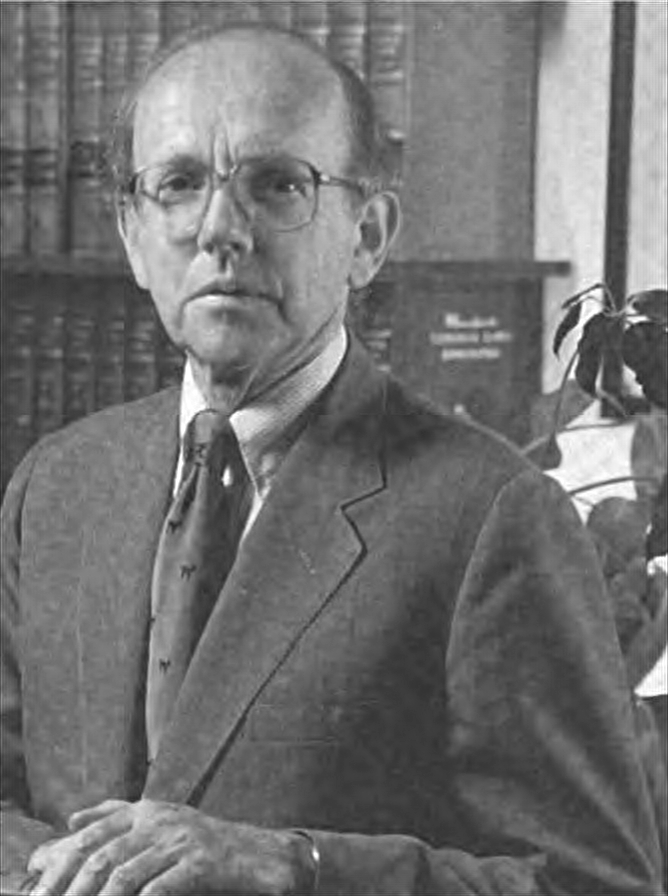

Senior Judge of the United States Court of Appeals for the First Circuit
- Incumbent
- Assumed office January 3, 1992

Chief Judge of the United States Court of Appeals for the First Circuit
- In office April 1983 – March 1990
- Preceded by: Frank M. Coffin
- Succeeded by: Stephen Breyer

Judge of the United States Court of Appeals for the First Circuit
- In office June 30, 1972 – January 3, 1992
- Appointed by: Richard Nixon
- Preceded by: Bailey Aldrich
- Succeeded by: Michael Boudin

Judge of the United States District Court for the District of Massachusetts
- In office November 30, 1971 – August 31, 1972
- Appointed by: Richard Nixon
- Preceded by: Charles Edward Wyzanski Jr.
- Succeeded by: Frank Harlan Freedman

Personal details
- Born: Levin Hicks Campbell; January 2, 1927 (age 99) Summit, New Jersey, U.S.
- Party: Republican
- Education: Harvard University (AB, LLB)

Levin Hicks Campbell (born January 2, 1927) is an inactive senior United States circuit judge of the United States Court of Appeals for the First Circuit.

== Education and career ==
Born in Summit, New Jersey, Campbell received an Artium Baccalaureus degree from Harvard University in 1948 and a LL.B from Harvard Law School in 1951. He served as a United States Army Lieutenant in the Judge Advocate General's Corps from 1952 to 1954, and received the Commendation Medal for his service in Korea. He then went into private practice of law in Boston, Massachusetts, with Ropes, Gray, Best, Coolidge & Rugg. He entered politics in 1963, performing several roles in Massachusetts over the next decade. He was a member of the Massachusetts House of Representatives from 1963 to 1964. Later he was an assistant attorney general of Massachusetts, serving under Attorney General Edward W. Brooke, and First Assistant Attorney General of Massachusetts serving under Attorney General Elliott L. Richardson, before being appointed an associate justice of the Massachusetts Superior Court in 1968, a position in which he served through 1970.

== Federal judicial service ==
Campbell was nominated by President Richard Nixon on November 12, 1971, to a seat on the United States District Court for the District of Massachusetts vacated by Judge Charles Edward Wyzanski Jr. He was confirmed by the United States Senate on November 23, 1971, and received his commission on November 30, 1971. His service terminated on August 31, 1972, due to his elevation to the First Circuit.

Campbell was nominated by President Nixon on June 15, 1972, to a seat on the United States Court of Appeals for the First Circuit vacated by Judge Bailey Aldrich. He was confirmed by the Senate on June 28, 1972, and received his commission on June 30, 1972. He served as Chief Judge from 1983 to 1990. He assumed senior status on January 3, 1992.

== See also ==
- List of United States federal judges by longevity of service

== Sources ==
Legal offices
Preceded by Charles Edward Wyzanski Jr.	Judge of the United States District Court for the District of Massachusetts; 1971–1972	Succeeded by Frank Harlan Freedman
Preceded by Bailey Aldrich	Judge of the United States Court of Appeals for the First Circuit; 1972–1992	Succeeded by Michael Boudin
Preceded by Frank M. Coffin	Chief Judge of the United States Court of Appeals for the First Circuit; 1983–1990	Succeeded by Stephen Breyer
