= Rhode Island Heritage Hall of Fame Women Inductees =

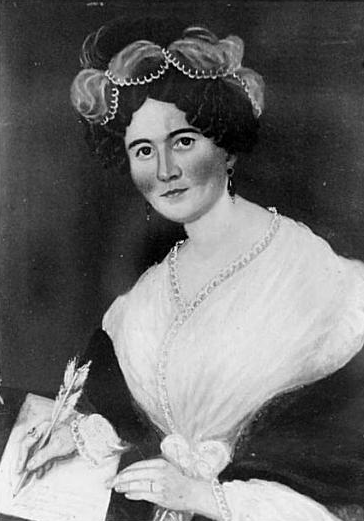
Catharine R. Williams ca. 1835

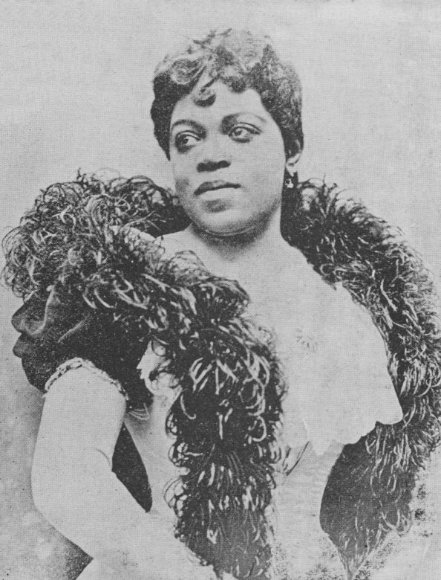
Matilda Sissieretta Jones, 1897

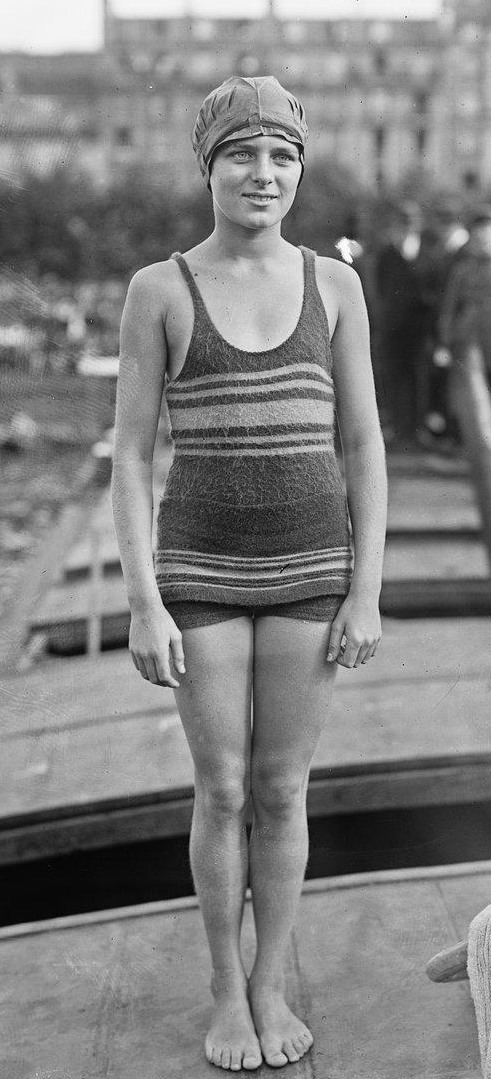
Aileen Riggin, 1920 at age 14, when she won an Olympic Gold Medal

The Rhode Island Heritage Hall of Fame is a non-profit, volunteer organization that recognizes those who have brought credit, prominence, or contributions to the heritage or history of Rhode Island.

== History ==
The organization was founded and incorporated as a non-profit organization in 1965 to recognize the contributions of citizens of the state of Rhode Island. Since 2013, it has had a partnership with the Heritage Harbor Museum. Though the organization recognizes the contributions of any citizen, a separate listing of women inductees is maintained.

== Criteria ==
The eligibility criteria for membership requires that significant contributions to the history or heritage of Rhode Island and is open to those born in the state, those who are residents when their notability occurred, and those who have permanent homes in Rhode Island.

== Inductees ==
The hall inducts new members annually and includes both contemporary and historical Rhode Islanders.

Name	Image	Birth–Death	Year	Area of achievement	Ref(s)
Roberta Mudge Humble		(1946–)	2022	Professor and author	
Elaine Lorillard		(1914–2007)	2022	Co-founder of the Newport Jazz Festival	
Jeannie Carroll Serpa		(1932–2021)	2022	Educator, artist, author, inventor, and business owner	
Elizabeth Morancy		(1941–)	2021	Catholic nun and State Representative	
Sara MacCormack Algeo		(1876–1953)	2020	Suffragist and educator	
Roberta J. Dunbar		(1868–1956)	2020	African American clubwoman and peace activist	
Bertha G. Higgins		(1872–1944)	2020	African American civic leader	
Maria Kindberg		(1860–1921)	2020	Suffragist	
Ingeborg Kindstedt		(1865–1950)	2020	Suffragist	
Sophia R. Little		(1799–1893)	2020	Abolitionist and suffragist	
Fanny Purdy Palmer		(1839–1923)	2020	Author, poet, social activist	
Anna W. Spencer		(1799–1884)	2020	Social reformer, newspaper publisher	
Lillie Buffum Chace Wyman		(1847–1929)	2020	Social reformer, poet	
Sister Mary Reilly		(1930–)	2019	Missionary who helped establish McAuley House, Dorcas Place, and Sophia Academy	
Rose E. Weaver			2019	Social justice reformer, actress, singer, producer and director	
Patrice Wood			2018	Television journalism	
Sarah J. Eddy		(1851–1945)	2017	Philanthropist, humanitarian, painter and sculptor, photographer, suffragette and author	
Marie Rode Ferron		(1902–1936)	2017	Religious piety	
Wini Blacher Galkin		(1930–2015)	2017	Business/entrepreneur, philanthropist	
Louisa Sharpe Metcalf		(1866–1959)	2017	Philanthropist	
Pauline Maier		(1938–2013)	2016	Historian	
Patricia R. Recupero		(1938–2013)	2016	Mental health advocate	
Betty R. Vohr			2016	Medical Director of Women & Infants Hospital's Neonatal Follow-Up Program	
Gertrude I. Johnson		(1876–1961)	2015	Founder of Johnson & Wales University	
Mary T. Wales		(1874–1952)	2015	Founder of Johnson & Wales University	
Margaret A. McKenna		(1945–)	2015	Served as White House Deputy Counsel, Deputy Undersecretary in the United States Department of Education, president of Lesley University and president of the WalMart Foundation	
Noreen Stonor Drexel		(1922–2012)	2015	Health care and education philanthropist	
Catherine O'Reilly Collette		(ca. 1951–)	2014	Women's rights advocate and national organizer on women's issues	
Isabelle Ahearn O’Neill		(1880–1975)	2014	Silent-film actress, suffragette, first woman legislator	
Abby Aldrich Rockefeller		(1874–1948)	2014	Philanthropist, who pushed for the creation of the Museum of Modern Art in New York	
Wilma Briggs		(1930–2023)	2013	All-American Girls Professional Baseball League player who led the league in home runs during the 1953 season and ranks second in the all-time home runs list	
Billie Ann Burrill		(1921–2010)	2013	Co-founder and a director of the Rhode Island College Dance Company and master swimmer, setting 800-meter freestyle and the 1500-meter long course world records in her age category	
Martha McSally		(1966–)	2013	First American woman to fly in combat and was also the first woman to command a USAF fighter squadron	
Lucy Rawlings Tootell		(1911–2010)	2013	Teacher and historic preservationist	
Karen Adams		(1955–)	2012	Journalist, television anchor and newscaster	
Eileen Slocum		(1915–2008)	2012	Rhode Island Republican national committeewoman from 1992 to 2008	
Mary C. Wheeler		(1846–1920)	2012	Artist and founder of Providence's Wheeler School	
Jane Stuart		(1812–1888)	2011	First woman portraitist of Newport	
Kathleen S. Connell		(1937–)	2010	Politician, who served at the local and state levels and was Secretary of State of Rhode Island between 1987 and 1993	
Susan Farmer		(1942–2013)	2010	First woman in Rhode Island to hold a statewide office, when elected as Secretary of State	
Caroline Hazard		(1856–1945)	2010	Fifth President of Wellesley College and credited with establishing an endowment for enduring financial stability	
Annie Smith Peck		(1850–1935)	2009	Mountaineer and adventurer who scaled Mount Huascaran in Peru	
Maud Howe Elliott		(1854–1948)	2008	American writer, noted winning the Pulitzer Prize in collaboration with her sister for their mother's biography The Life of Julia Ward Howe	
Marjorie Joy Vogel		(1930–2007)	2008	Artist and illustrator who created the largest body of Rhode Island-themed illustration work	
Anna Garlin Spencer		(1851–1931)	2007	President of the Rhode Island Equal Suffrage Association	
Mary Emma Woolley		(1863–1947)	2007	One of America's youngest college presidents	
M. Therese Antone			2006	President of Salve Regina University	
Nancy Gewirtz		(1945–2004)	2006	Co-founder of The Poverty Institute and the Rhode Island Campaign to Eliminate Childhood Poverty	
Barbara H. Roberts		(1944–)	2006	First woman Gorlin Cardiology Fellow at the Brigham and Women's Hospital and the first woman to practice adult cardiology in Rhode Island	
Sarah Elizabeth Doyle		(1830–1922)	2005	Founder of the Rhode Island School of Design and establishing women's education at Brown University	
Norma Ann Garnett		(1930–2005)	2005	Recognized as Teacher of the Year by Rhode Island and Maine, 1991 White House Distinguished Teacher Award recipient	
Idawally Lewis		(1842–1911)	2005	First woman to serve in the U.S. Lighthouse Service	
Alice A. Sullivan		(1925–2003)	2005	Women's sport activist and educator, successfully lobbied for the Rhode Island Interscholastic League's sports program to include girls	
Sara DeCosta-Hayes		(1977–)	2004	Two-time Olympic ice hockey medalist: 1998 Nagano gold and 2002 Salt Lake City silver	
Lynne Jewell		(1959–)	2004	1988 Seoul Olympic gold medalist in the women's 470 Class yachting	
Helen Johns		(1914–2014)	2004	1932 Los Angeles Olympic gold medalist in the women's 400-meter freestyle swim	
Katie King-Crowley		(1975–)	2004	Three time Winter Olympic ice hockey medalist	
Frances Whipple McDougall		(1805–1878)	2004	19th-century poet, abolitionist, botanist, and suffragette	
Harriet Metcalf		(1958–)	2004	1984 Los Angeles Olympics women's eight rowing gold medalist	
Aileen Riggin		(1906–2002)	2004	1920 Summer Olympics swimming gold medalist	
Lila Sapinsley		(1922–2014)	2004	State Senator and Senate minority leader	
Sarah Helen Whitman		(1803–1878)	2004	19th-century poet, essayist, and Spiritualist	
Christiana Carteaux Bannister		(1822–1903)	2003	Abolitionist and entrepreneur	
Paulina Kellogg Wright Davis		(1813–1876)	2003	Co-founder of the New England Woman Suffrage Association	
Julia Ward Howe		(1819–1910)	2003	Abolitionist and author of "The Battle Hymn of the Republic"	
Victoria S. Lederberg		(1937–2002)	2003	State Senator and state Supreme Court judge	
Elizabeth Buffum Chace		(1806–1899)	2002	Abolitionist and suffragette, the first woman to be memorialized with a statue in the Rhode Island State House	
Leona McElroy Kelley		(1919–2000)	2002	Teacher and state House Representative	
Mother Frances Warde		(1810–1884)	2002	Founder of the Sisters of Mercy (R.S.M.) in America	
Catharine R. Williams		(1787–1872)	2002	19th-century poet and writer	
Prudence Crandall		(1803–1890)	2001	Founder of a school that became the first integrated classroom in the United States	
Doris Duke		(1912–1993)	2001	Philanthropist, preservationist and founders of the Newport Restoration Foundation	
Mary Elizabeth Sharpe		(1885–1985)	2001	Amateur landscape architect, who spearheaded landscape design at Brown University, the Japanese Gardens at Roger Williams Park, and the renovation of India Point Park.	
Harriet Ware		(1799–1847)	2001	Teacher and founder of a children's aid society called the Children's Friend Society	
Doris Holloway Abels		(1925–1997)	2000	Ed Sullivan dancer with the Holloway Sisters, later mental health professional and professor at Brown University and Rhode Island College	
Beatrice Oenslager Chace		(1909–1992)	1999	Philanthropist, preservationist and historic home conservationist	
Helen Metcalf Danforth		(1887–1984)	1998	Benefactor of the Rhode Island School of Design and president of the RISD Corporation, recipient of the first honorary degree awarded by the institution	
Ann Smith Franklin		(1696–1763)	1998	First female newspaper editor of the American colonies	
Sarah Updike Goddard		(1701–1770)	1998	Published Providence's first newspaper, The Providence Gazette	
Mary Dyer		(1611–1660)	1997	Quaker martyr, one of the founders of Portsmouth	
Sylvia K. Hassenfeld		(1920–2014)	1997	Jewish philanthropist, president of Providence Jewish Federation	
Anne Hutchinson		(1591–1643)	1997	Established the settlement of Portsmouth in what became the Colony of Rhode Island and Providence Plantations	
Margaret Langdon-Kelly		(1904–2001)	1997	Co-founder of Meeting Street School for special needs children	
Maria Spacagna		(1951–)	1997	First American-born opera singer to perform Madame Butterfly at La Scala	
Helen A. Bert		(1922–2002)	1996	Director and developer of the Women's Athletics Program at Providence College	
Catherine Tilley Hammett		(1902–1998)	1996	First Girl Scout of Newport and later served on the national staff of the Girl Scouts of the USA	
Helen Adelia Rowe Metcalf		(1830–1895)	1996	Founder and director of the Rhode Island School of Design	
Arlene Violet		(1943–)	1996	First woman attorney general in the United States	
Lizzie Murphy		(1894–1964)	1994	First woman baseball player to play against major league players	
Barbara-Jeanne Seabury		(1927–2002)	1994	Child welfare advocate, author and the Director of Rhode Island Hospital's Child Life Department	
Mary C. Mulvey		(1909–2003)	1993	Geriatrics, president National Senior Citizens Education and Research Center	
Nancy A. J. Potter		(1926–2023)	1992	Short story writer and professor, recipient of University of Rhode Island President's Award for Excellence in Teaching	
Mary P. Brennan		(1933–1996)	1992	Pioneer in the travel and tourism industry serving on state and national tourism advisory committees; first woman in the country to serve as a station manager in the airline industry	
Gladys Williams Brayton		(1890–1990)	1991	Historian and author	
Ade Bethune		(1914–2002)	1990	Catholic liturgical artist and the artistic director of the Terra Sancta Guild	
Marion F. Avarista		(1938–)	1988	Founder of the Traveler's Aid Runaway Youth Project	
Sister Mary Bernard			1987	Teacher, Principle, and Head of the Guidance Department at St. Mary's Academy	
Sister Eileen Murphy		(1935–1983)	1987	Founder of the Amos House homeless shelter of Providence	
Eleanor M. McMahon		(1929–2002)	1986	First Commissioner of Higher Education	
Olive F. Wiley		(1902–1993)	1985	African American Day Care founder and Mother of the Year	
Katharine Gibbs		(1863–1934)	1983	Founder of Gibbs College	
Eleanor Slater		(1909–2006)	1982	State Representative, State Senator and National Democratic Committeewoman	
Katherine U. Warren		(1897–1976)	1981	Conservationist, preservationist and founder of the Preservation Society of Newport	
Anna Tucker		(1919–2012)	1981	First Director for the R.I. Department of Elderly Affairs	
Florence K. Murray		(1916–2004)	1980	First woman state senator, the first woman judge and the first female member of the Rhode Island Supreme Court	
Diane L. Coutu		(1946–)	1980	Journalist and later editor of the Harvard Business Review	
Antoinette F. Downing		(1904–2001)	1978	Preservationist and Chair of the Rhode Island Historical Preservation Commission and the Providence Historic District Commission	
Frances G. Knight		(1905–1999)	1978	Director of the U.S. Passport Office	
Princess Red Wing		(1896–1987)	1978	Narragansett tribe member, assisted in drafting the tribal bylaws under the Indian Reorganization Act and designed the tribal seal	
Gertrude Meth Hochberg		(1911–2002)	1977	1964 Advertising Woman of the Year of the Advertising Federation of America, first woman vice president of Bryant College	
Matilda Sissieretta Jones		(1869–1933)	1977	Internationally renowned soprano	
Catherine Robinson			1975	Civil rights advocate, assistant director of the University of Rhode Island Extension Division Service	
Margaret F. Ackroyd		(1908–1995)	1972	Chief of the Division of Women and Children and Commissioner of minimum wage for Rhode Island	
Ruth Buzzi		(1936–2025)	1971	American comedian and actress	
Ida Silverman		(1882–1973)	1971	Only woman to serve as vice president of the Zionist Organization of America and the American Jewish Congress	
Jean Madeira		(1918–1972)	1970	Contralto diva of the Metropolitan Opera	
JoAnne Carner		(1939–)	1969	Five-time national women's amateur golf champion and three-time Rhode Island golf champion	
June Rockwell Levy		(1886–1971)	1969	Philanthropist, who established with her husband the Burrillville Town Buildings Project	
Mary Tucker Thorp		(1899–1974)	1969	First distinguished professor at Rhode Island College	
E. Doris Brennan		(1921–1988)	1968	Holder of twenty national and world swimming records in 1930s and 1940s; selected for 1940 Olympics which was cancelled due to World War	
Paula Deubel		(1935–1993)	1968	1954 national collegiate shot put champion, 1956 Melbourne Olympic shot put competitor	
Carole Garnett-Wheeler		(1898–1978)	1968	1924 Paris Olympic Games swimming competitor, later Rhode Island Republican National Convention delegate	
Clara LaMore		(1926–2021)	1968	1948 London Olympic Games breaststroke competitor, 5 time national champion	
Janet Moreau		(1927–2021)	1968	1952 Helsinki Olympic Games gold medal 4 x 100 meters relay winner	
Albina Osipowich		(1911–1964)	1968	1928 Amsterdam Olympic Games gold medal swimmer	
Lois Ann Testa		(1935–)	1968	1956 Melbourne Olympic Games athlete	
Eileen Farrell		(1920–2002)	1967	Noted American soprano	
Ruth Hussey		(1911–2005)	1967	Academy Award-nominated actress	
Glenna Collett Vare		(1903–1989)	1966	Champion golfer who dominated the sport in the 1920s	
