= Lederberg =

Lederberg is a surname meaning "leather mountain" in German and may refer to:

- Esther Lederberg (1922-2006), American microbiologist and a pioneer of bacterial genetics
- Joshua Lederberg (1925-2008), American molecular biologist
- Victoria Lederberg (1937-2002), American judge, Justice of Rhode Island Supreme Court
