= Algeo =

Algeo is a surname and occasional given name. Notable people with the name include:

- Bill Algeo (born 1989), American martial artist
- John Algeo (1930–2019), American Theosophist and Freemason
- Sara MacCormack Algeo (1876–1953), American suffragist and educator
- Thomas Algeo Rowley (1808–1892), Union Army general
