= Elizabeth Morancy =

American politician (born 1953)

Member of the Rhode Island House of Representatives from the 11th district
- In office 1978–1984

Personal details
- Born: May 12, 1941 (age 85) Providence, Rhode Island, U.S.
- Party: Democratic
- Education: Salve Regina University
- Profession: Nun
- Awards: Rhode Island Heritage Hall of Fame Inductee

Elizabeth Morancy (born 1941) is a Catholic teacher, advocate, former Rhode Island State Representative, and former Sister of Mercy from Providence, Rhode Island.

In 1984, Morancy gained international attention for resigning from the Sisters of Mercy, after 24 years in the order, due to Pope John Paul II's canon that barred nuns from holding elective or public office. Morancy is one of the only known women to have held public office while simultaneously serving as a nun in the United States.

== Career ==
Morancy graduated from Salve Regina University in 1964.

Morancy served as a teacher at St Xavier’s Academy and a political science professor at Salve Regina University.

In 1971, Morancy joined a coalition of 47 nuns, that met in Washington, DC to collaborate on how to best respond to Pope Paul VI's letter, "A CALL TO ACTION”, encouraging Christians to respond to injustice. The gathering was the founding meeting of NETWORK Lobby for Catholic Social Justice and inspired Morancy to leave her job as a teacher to minister for the poor and advocate for social justice.

In 1975, along with Mary Reilly, Morancy co-founded McAuley House, an organization that provides essential services to low income families and individuals in Providence.

In 1978, Morancy was elected to the Rhode Island State Legislature "by a landslide", according to Time's "50 Faces for America's Future", representing "the Spanish-speaking, Black, Laotian and blue-collar white residents" of Providence’s Elmwood and South Elmwood neighborhoods.

In 1984, Morancy defied the Vatican, by running for a fourth term despite a new church law that required the Bishop's permission to seek public office. Morancy refused to resign from her religious order or ask the Bishop for permission to run for office, while commenting publicly on the marginalization of women leaders in Catholicism. Her defiance was reported on internationally.

Morancy ultimately decided to resign from the Sisters of Mercy rather than leave her political position. Following her decision to remain in office, Morancy received a commendation from the bishop "for her commitment to the poor and those on the margins".

In the 1980's, Morancy worked as a social worker in Providence with Hmong refugees from Laos.

In 2009, Rhode Island State Representative Grace Diaz and the Women's Fund of Rhode Island honored Morancy and her colleagues for their "commitment to advancing equity and social justice for women and girls focusing on fairness, impartiality opportunity and shared power in all spheres of life."

In 2014, Morancy was honored with the Salve Regina Mission Award.

Morancy served as the executive director of the Rhode Island Chapter of the Alzheimer’s Association for eighteen years.

In 2021, Morancy was inducted into the Rhode Island Heritage Hall of Fame.
