= Susan Farmer =

American politician

Susan L. Farmer
- Born: Susan L. Lawson; May 29, 1942; Boston, Massachusetts, U.S.
- Died: September 16, 2013 (aged 71); Providence, Rhode Island, U.S.
- Occupations: Politician; media executive; television personality
- Office: Secretary of State of Rhode Island
- Term: 1982–1986
- Political party: Republican

Susan L. (née Lawson) Farmer (May 29, 1942 – September 16, 2013) was an American politician, media executive and television personality.

Born in Boston, Massachusetts, she went to Garland Junior College and Brown University Extension Division. Farmer got her start in politics protesting the Vietnam War with her husband Malcolm Farmer and helped start a dump-Richard Nixon rally that drew thousands to the Rhode Island State House. In 1972, she ran the Rhode Island campaign for California Republican Pete McCloskey, who was trying to deny Nixon another nomination for president. After becoming then-U.S. Senator John Chafee’s finance director in 1976, Farmer ran for and won, in 1979, a seat on the commission drafting a new Home Rule charter for the city of Providence. She then ran for Secretary of State of Rhode Island in 1980, but lost to incumbent Robert Burns, before winning two years later in 1982 by defeating Democrat and future Rhode Island Supreme Court Justice Victoria Lederberg. Farmer was the first woman in Rhode Island history to serve in statewide constitutional office and served two two-year terms, from 1982 through 1986 as a Republican. After elected office, she then served as General Manager of Rhode Island PBS until her retirement in 2004.

She died in 2013, in Providence, Rhode Island, at the age of 71 of cancer.

Farmer was inducted into the Rhode Island Heritage Hall of Fame in 2010, and was a 2013 recipient of the Isabelle Ahearn O'Neill Award. She is memorialized to this day by a sandwich named the "Susan Farmer" at Geoff’s Superlative Sandwiches in Providence.

Political offices
Preceded by Robert F. Burns	Secretary of State of Rhode Island; 1983–1987	Succeeded by Kathleen S. Connell
