= Victoria Lederberg =

American judge (1937–2002)

Associate Justice of the Rhode Island Supreme Court
- In office 1993–2002
- Succeeded by: Paul Suttell

Member of the Rhode Island Senate from the 3rd district
- In office 1985–1991

Member of the Rhode Island House of Representatives from the 4th district
- In office 1974–1983

Personal details
- Born: July 7, 1937 Providence, Rhode Island, US
- Died: December 29, 2002 (aged 65) Providence, Rhode Island, US

Victoria Lederberg (July 7, 1937 – December 29, 2002) was a justice of the Rhode Island Supreme Court from 1993 to 2002. Before her appointment, Lederberg was a member of the Rhode Island House of Representatives from 1974 to 1983 and the Rhode Island Senate from 1985 to 1991. In 2003, she was posthumously inducted into the Rhode Island Heritage Hall of Fame.

== Early life and education ==
Lederberg was born on July 7, 1937, in Providence, Rhode Island, US. She graduated from Brown University with a Doctor of Philosophy in 1966 and a Juris Doctor from Suffolk University Law School in 1976.

== Career ==
In 1968, Lederberg began her career as a psychology professor at Rhode Island College. She became a member of the Rhode Island House of Representatives in 1974 and became a lawyer in 1976. As a politician, Lederberg remained with the House of Representatives until 1983. She was elected to the Rhode Island Senate in 1985 and was with the Senate until 1991. For her judicial career, Lederberg worked for the Providence Municipal Court before being named to the Rhode Island Supreme Court in 1993.

Apart from her tenures, Lederberg ran for Secretary of State of Rhode Island in 1982 but lost to Susan Farmer. In 1990, Lederberg was one of the candidates running for mayor of Providence. Before the Democratic primary in Rhode Island, she participated in a competition where she and the other candidates became mayor of a virtual version of Providence in SimCity. During her play session, Lederberg converted a power plant from conventional fuel to nuclear, built numerous police stations and accidentally demolished a church. At the 1990 primary, Lederberg lost to Andrew Annaldo after an election recount was made.

== Awards and honors ==
Lederberg was posthumously inducted into the Rhode Island Heritage Hall of Fame in 2003.

== Personal life and death ==
Lederberg was married and had two children. She died on December 29, 2002, in Providence from a heart attack. She was Jewish.

Party political offices
Preceded by Robert F. Burns	Democratic nominee for Secretary of State of Rhode Island; 1982	Succeeded by Bonnie M. Cimino
