= Kathleen S. Connell =

American politician

Secretary of State of Rhode Island
- In office 1987–1993
- Governor: Edward D. DiPrete
- Preceded by: Susan Farmer
- Succeeded by: Barbara Leonard

Personal details
- Born: May 24, 1937 (age 89)
- Party: Democratic

Kathleen Sullivan Connell (born May 24, 1937) is an American former politician from the state of Rhode Island. She was the Secretary of State of Rhode Island between 1987 and 1993.

== Early life ==
Connell was born on May 24, 1937, in Newport, Rhode Island. Her parents were Laurence Sullivan and Margaret Sullivan (née Brynes). She attended St. Mary’s School and St. Catherine Academy. She received a bachelors of science degree in nursing from Salve Regina College in 1958, graduating magna cum laude. She completed graduate studies at Boston College, the University of Rhode Island and Rhode Island College. She married Gerald Connell in 1960 and the couple had three children: Laurence, Margaret and Kathleen. Connell worked as a registered nurse from 1970 to 1986.

== Political career ==
Connell was a delegate at the 1984 Democratic National Convention and the following year, she was appointed to the Democratic National Committee and became a member of the Women's Democratic Caucus. She started her political career as a member of the Middletown, Rhode Island school committee, where she served for 13 years, and the Middletown town council. She served one term in the Rhode Island Senate in the 48th district, being elected in 1983 and serving until 1984, before running for Secretary of State.

She was the Secretary of State of Rhode Island between 1987 and 1993. During her State Office position, one of her most noteworthy achievements was saving historical records in the Rhode Island state capitol's basement. After leaving office, she worked as the Rhode Island Director of AARP. Connell was inducted into the Rhode Island Heritage Hall of Fame in 2010, and is a 2013 recipient of the Isabelle Ahearn O'Neill Award.

Party political offices
Preceded by Matt Brown	Democratic nominee for Secretary of State of Rhode Island; 1986, 1988, 1990, 1992	Succeeded by James Langevin
Political offices
Preceded by Susan Farmer	Secretary of State of Rhode Island; 1987–1993	Succeeded by Barbara Leonard
