= Garland Junior College =

Liberal arts women's college

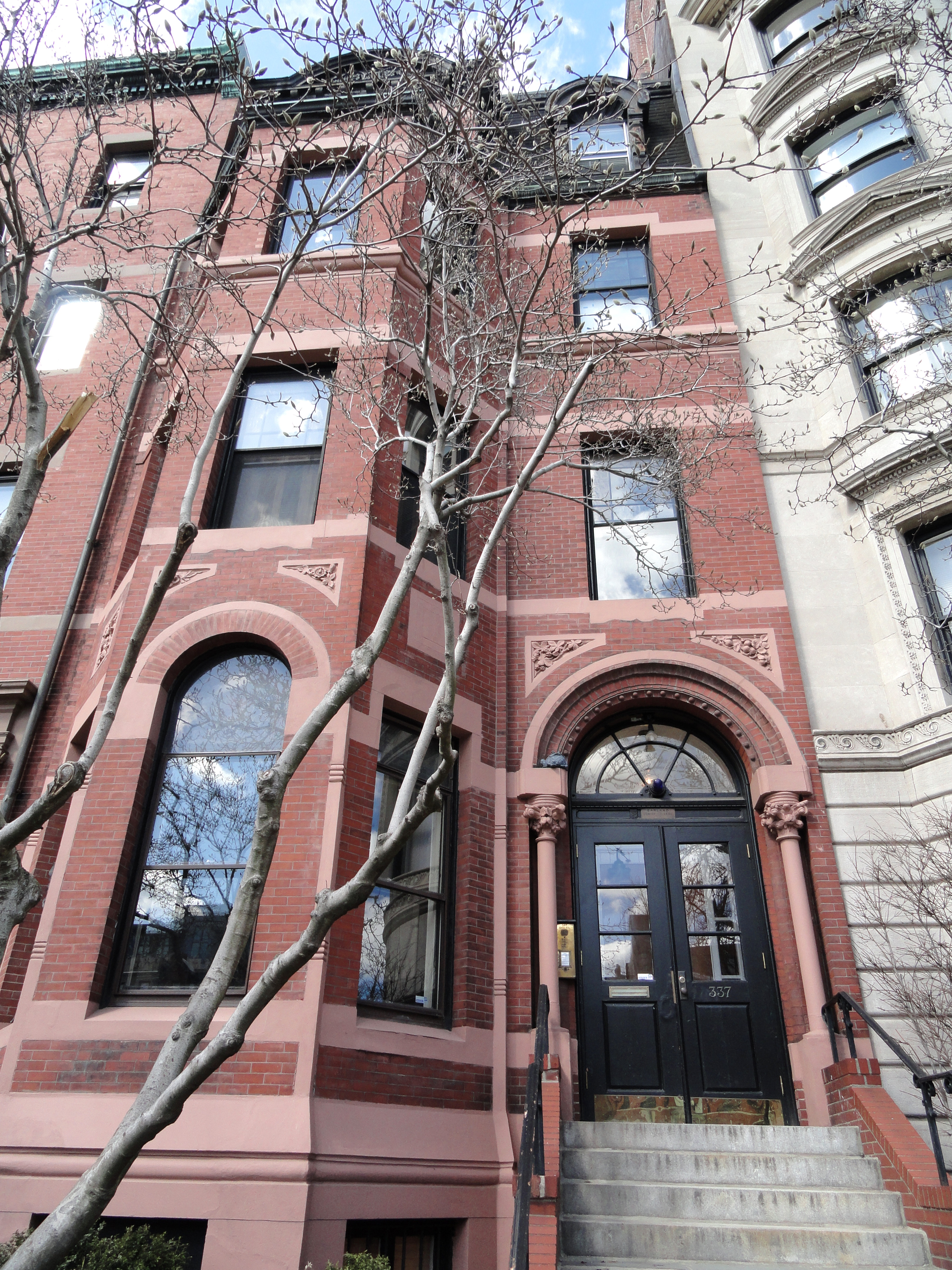
- Type: Private women's junior college
- Established: 1872
- Location: Boston, Massachusetts, United States
- Affiliations: Simmons College

Garland Junior College (1872–1976) was a liberal arts women's college in Boston, Massachusetts. Mary Garland established the Garland Kindergarten Training School in 1872 on Chestnut Street in Boston's Beacon Hill. By 1903, the school had expanded its curriculum to include home economics, and was renamed the Garland School of Homemaking. It was authorized as a junior college in 1948, and subsequently granted the AS degree as Garland Junior College. Studies in the visual arts became the AA program, and curriculum included illustration, fine art painting, graphic design, and jewelry design. Marc Brown, author of the "Arthur" children's book series, taught illustration at Garland during the 70s.

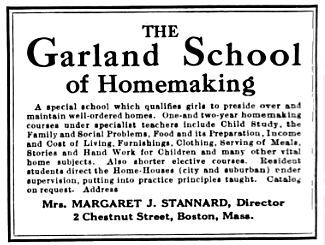
Advertisement for the Garland School, 1921

In March 1976, economic shifts resulted in a vote by the Board of Trustees to transfer the Garland Junior College name, physical facilities, and certain other assets to Simmons College. Garland Junior College graduated its last class of 98 students in May 1976.

== Notable alumni ==
- Susan Farmer, Rhode Island politician and businesswoman
- Tipper Gore, Second Lady of the United States
- Anne Sexton, poet
- Bunny Williams, interior decorator
- Deborah Duke Foley Schwert, artist
