= Karen Adams =

American journalist and newscaster

- Born: July 4, 1955 (age 71)
- Education: Missouri State University
- Occupations: TV newscaster and reporter
- Spouse: Ed Mauro

Karen Adams (born July 4, 1955) is an American newscaster who worked in many stations around the country, but her longest period (over 21 years) was at WPRI-TV in Providence, Rhode Island.

== Education and early career ==
Adams graduated from Southwest Missouri State University in 1975 with a degree in speech and theatre, and a minor in journalism. She began her career in broadcasting as the only news employee at an AM radio station near her hometown.

== Television news ==
Adams began her television career at KOAM-TV in Pittsburg/Joplin, and also worked for WMDT-TV in Salisbury, Maryland. Before joining WPRI, she was an anchor and then news director at WPCQ-TV in Charlotte, North Carolina. She arrived in Providence in March 1989, anchoring the 6 and 11 p.m. reports, and adding the 5 p.m. report to her duties in 2002. Adams is the second-longest-serving female newscaster in Providence working at WPRI-TV for 21 years, Patrice Wood of WJAR, 40 years.

Karan Adams' final broadcast on WPRI-TV was on Thursday, December 30, 2010.

== Personal life ==
Adams was well known as a supporter and fundraiser for dozens of local charities, from AIDS Care Rhode Island to The DaVinci Center. Adams was also involved in many community organisations, including the Providence Preservation Society and Community Preparatory School.

An avid golf player, Adams is married to Ed Mauro, and lives a half of the year in Providence and the other half in North Carolina.
