= James Langevin =

American politician (born 1964)

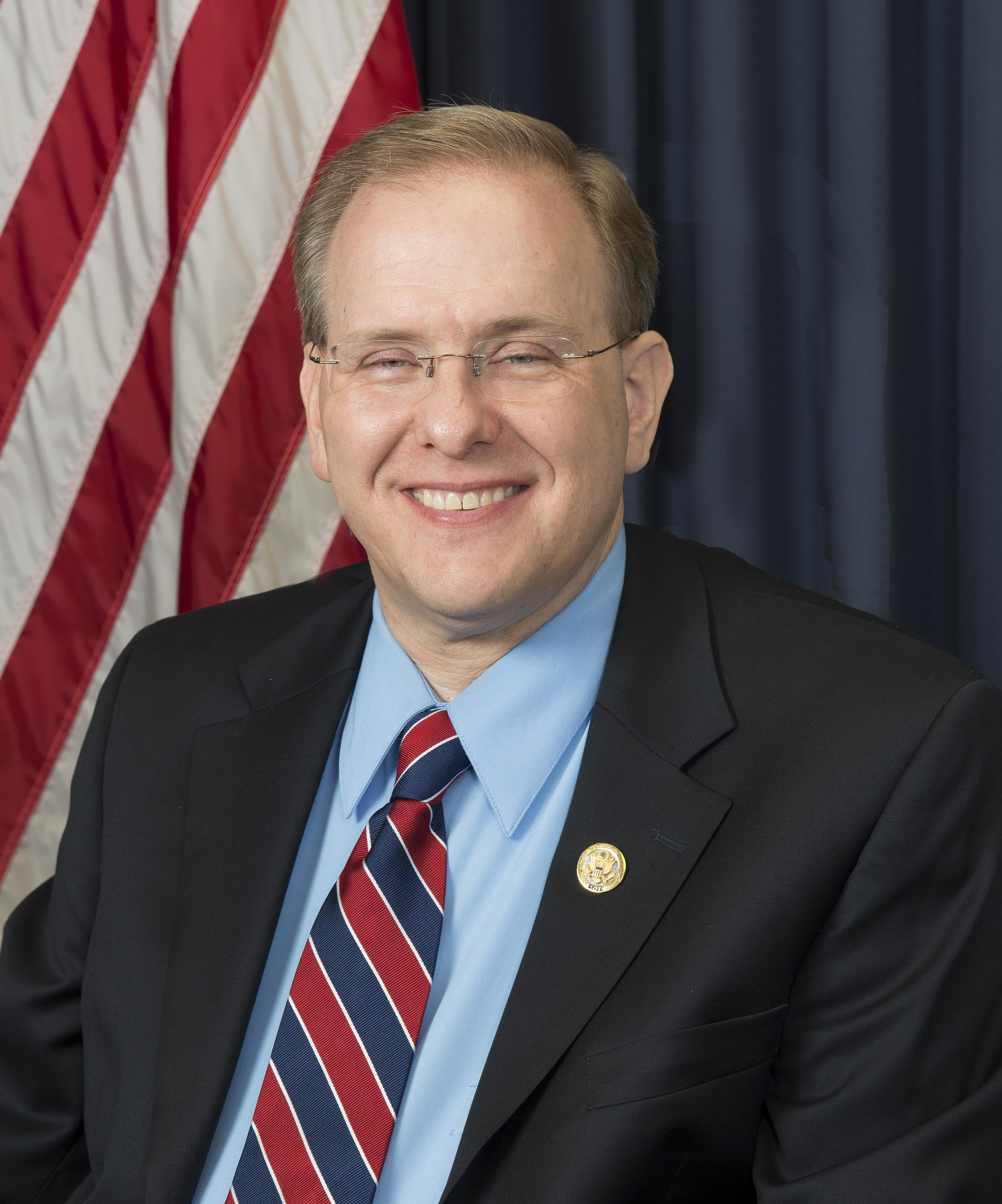
- Official portrait, 2013

Member of the U.S. House of Representatives from Rhode Island's 2nd district
- In office January 3, 2001 – January 3, 2023
- Preceded by: Robert Weygand
- Succeeded by: Seth Magaziner

24th Secretary of State of Rhode Island
- In office January 3, 1995 – January 3, 2001
- Governor: Lincoln Almond
- Preceded by: Barbara Leonard
- Succeeded by: Ed Inman

Member of the Rhode Island House of Representatives from the 29th district
- In office January 4, 1989 – January 3, 1995
- Preceded by: Marion Donnelly
- Succeeded by: Joseph McNamara

Personal details
- Born: April 22, 1964 (age 62) Providence, Rhode Island, U.S.
- Party: Democratic
- Education: Rhode Island College (BA); Harvard University (MPA)
- Langevin's voice Langevin supporting the Protecting Older Workers against Discrimination Act of 2021. Recorded June 23, 2021

James R. Langevin (/ˈlændʒəˌvɪn/ LANN-jə-vinn; born April 22, 1964) is an American politician who served as the U.S. representative for Rhode Island's 2nd congressional district from 2001 to 2023. A member of the Democratic Party, he is the first quadriplegic to serve in Congress; Langevin was appointed to be the first quadriplegic speaker pro tempore of the U.S. House of Representatives in 2019. Langevin did not seek reelection in 2022.

== Early life and education ==
Langevin was born in Providence, Rhode Island, to Richard and Judy (Barrett) Langevin. He is of French-Canadian descent. He attended Bishop Hendricken High School in Warwick, Rhode Island, and Rhode Island College, from which he received an undergraduate degree, in addition to serving as president of Student Community Government, Inc. He has a Master of Public Administration from the Harvard Kennedy School at Harvard University.

In 1980, at age 16, Langevin was seriously injured in an accidental shooting. He had been working in the Boy Scout Explorer program at the Warwick Police Department when a firearm was accidentally discharged, leaving him paralyzed. Langevin received $2.2 million in a settlement with the city of Warwick.

== Rhode Island government ==
Langevin's first experience in politics was when he was elected to the state's 1986 constitutional convention and was named its secretary. Langevin, who uses a wheelchair, once ran on the slogan "I'll stand up for you", which he said during a meeting in West Warwick.

Langevin was first elected a member of the Rhode Island General Assembly in 1988 and served as a state representative until 1994. He was elected Secretary of State of Rhode Island in November 1994, defeating Republican incumbent Barbara Leonard. While Secretary of State, he earned a reputation for weeding out corruption in state government.

== U.S. House of Representatives ==
=== Committee assignments ===
- Committee on Armed Services
  - Subcommittee on Seapower and Projection Forces
  - Subcommittee on Strategic Forces
  - Subcommittee on Intelligence, Emerging Threats and Capabilities (Chair)
- Committee on Homeland Security
  - Subcommittee on Cybersecurity and Infrastructure Protection
  - Subcommittee on Emergency Preparedness, Response, and Communications

=== Caucus memberships ===
- Afterschool Caucuses
- Congressional Arts Caucus
- Congressional Coalition on Adoption
- Congressional Taiwan Caucus
- Congressional Ukrainian Caucus

== Political positions ==
Langevin voted with President Joe Biden's stated position 100% of the time in the 117th Congress, according to a FiveThirtyEight analysis.

=== Abortion ===
Langevin has a mixed record on abortion. He has voted both to restrict and defend the choice to have the procedure. He voted against banning abortion coverage in the Affordable Care Act, but for the Abortion Pain Bill, which seeks "to ensure that women seeking an abortion are fully informed regarding the pain experienced by their unborn child." He strongly promotes contraceptive availability, and in a 2007 statement said, "I have great respect for the passion displayed by Mr. Smith and Mr. Stupak and I share their opposition to abortion. However, in this instance I must strongly disagree with their decision to prevent the distribution of contraception to some of the most poor and needy people and nations in the world." Because of his mixed stance on the issue, he has received fluctuating ratings from interest groups such as Planned Parenthood and the National Right to Life Committee.

Langevin believes that abortion should be legal when the pregnancy is a result of incest or rape or when the pregnancy endangers the life of the mother. but wishes to decrease the number of abortions in the country. His relatively complex stance on abortion contributes to somewhat contradictory interest group ratings because of his support for various bills. Langevin's stance on abortion supported the interests of the NARAL Pro-Choice America 0% in 2006, but in 2007 the same group gave him a rating of 100% and the National Right to Life Committee gave him zero points, with points assigned for actions connected to an anti-abortion agenda.

=== Health care ===
Langevin has strongly supported health care reform. In May 2009, he introduced the American Health Benefits Program Act of 2009, with the stated purpose of "amending the Social Security Act and the Internal Revenue Code of 1986 to assure comprehensive, affordable health insurance coverage for all Americans through an American Health Benefits Program. He receives much of his campaign donations from health professionals. Langevin stated his goal of universal health care as "a system of portable and continuous coverage based on quality, affordability and choice that promotes investment in long-term prevention and drives down the cost of care over time."

=== Stem cell research ===
One of Langevin's top priorities in Congress has been the expansion of federal funding of embryonic stem cell research. His policy position is driven by his paralysis and the possibilities for stem cell research in alleviating this condition; he joined other House members in introducing the Stem Cell Research Enhancement Act of 2005, expanding the limited funding put in place in 2001.

=== Cybersecurity ===
Langevin helped found the House Cybersecurity Caucus, which he co-chairs. He has appeared on 60 Minutes speaking about the national security challenges the country will face this century in regard to protecting infrastructure and data. Langevin has said that he hopes to raise awareness of the need for cybersecurity and supports strict penalties for internet crimes as well as strong internet privacy laws.

Langevin supports cybersecurity measures as long as they do not add "unnecessary regulations to business". In October 2012, Rhode Island passed a statewide cybersecurity plan that Langevin strongly supported. In May 2012, he proposed an amendment to the National Defense Authorization Act (NDAA) that would account for the cyber risks the U.S. faces in terms of national security, saying without these measures the nation is "ignoring key aspects of what is fast becoming the biggest threat to our security".

Cybersecurity contractors General Dynamics and Raytheon were Langevin's two top sources for campaign contributions in the 2010 election.

In June 2015, FBI director James Comey announced that the United States Office of Personnel Management (OPM) had been the target of a data breach targeting the records of more than 18 million Americans. Langevin called for the resignation of OPM director Katherine Archuleta, saying, "I have seen no evidence Ms. Archuleta understands this central principle of cyber governance, and I am deeply concerned by her refusal to acknowledge her culpability in the breach."

=== Armed forces ===
Langevin, who served on the Committee of Armed Services, has regularly voted for additional support of armed forces in Iraq and Afghanistan but he has voted for a timeline for U.S. forces to leave Iraq as well as a ban on any permanent U.S. bases in the country. He has also voted against limiting the interrogation techniques used in fighting terror and the wars in Iraq and Afghanistan.

=== Tax cuts ===
Langevin, who serves on the Congressional Committee on the Budget, supports tax cuts for low-income and middle-class citizens while eliminating tax cuts for the wealthy, indicating in his Political Courage Test that he wishes to "greatly decrease" taxes for families making less than $75,000 a year. He also supports temporary incentives for businesses to invest in job creation. Langevin has a 100% rating from the AFL-CIO and supports the regulation of business.

=== Advocacy for disabled people ===
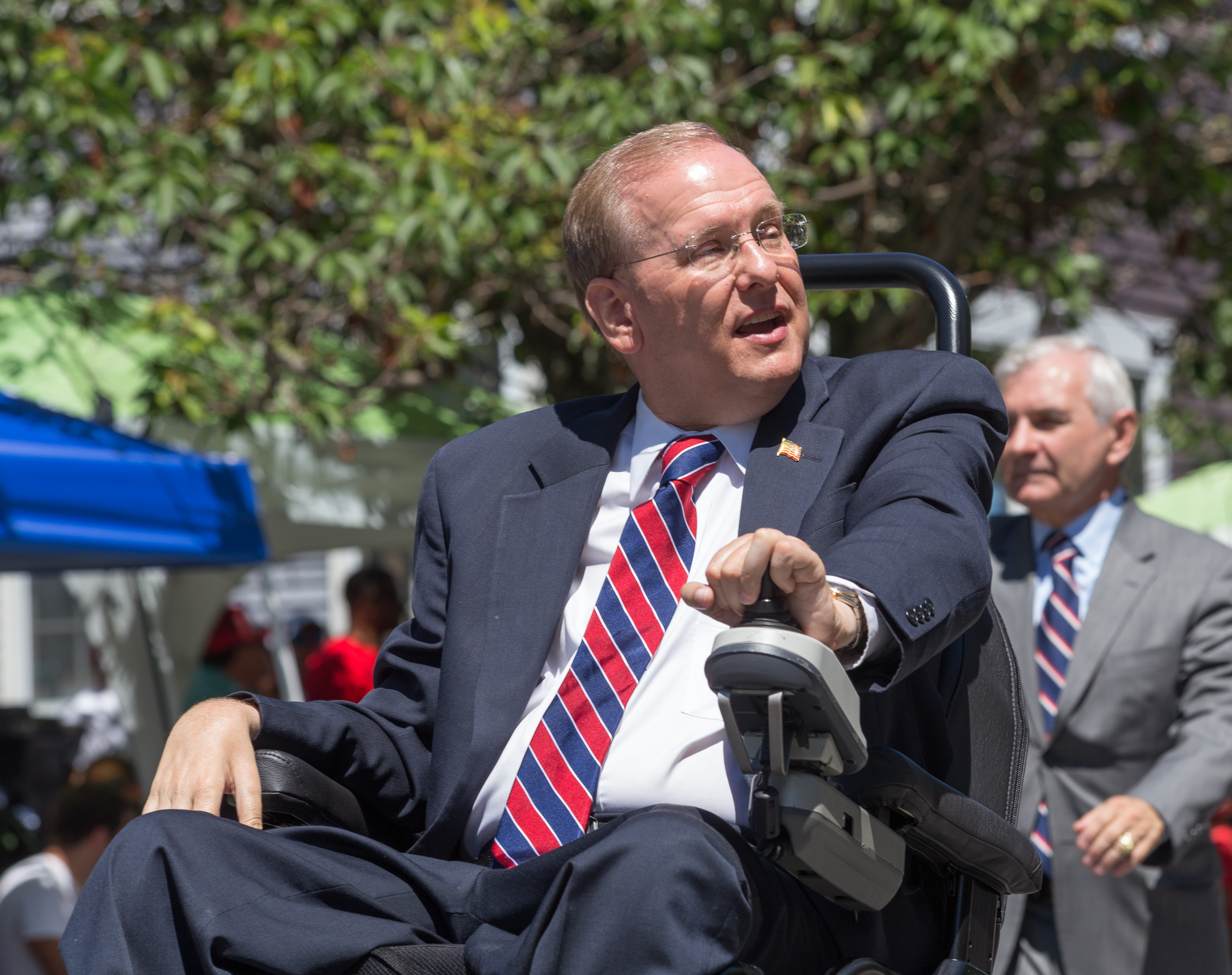
Langevin at the 2017 Bristol Fourth of July Parade

Langevin is known as an advocate for people with disabilities and for universal health care, being himself a quadriplegic. He is the first quadriplegic to serve in Congress.

On July 27, 2004, he spoke to the Democratic National Convention, largely on the subject of stem cell research.

In March 2007, Langevin co-sponsored the Christopher and Dana Reeve Paralysis Act, which had the stated purpose of "enhancing and furthering research into paralysis and to improve rehabilitation and the quality of life for persons living with paralysis and other physical disabilities." The bill passed the House but not the U.S. Senate. In 2009, the bill was included in the Omnibus Public Land Management Act, also co-sponsored by Langevin, which passed both houses of Congress and was signed into law by President Barack Obama.

In 2008, Langevin announced his support for Hillary Clinton for president, and served as a special adviser to her on issues ranging from stem cell research to people with disabilities.

On July 26, 2010, Langevin became the first member of Congress to preside over the House of Representatives while using a wheelchair. The House had just recently installed a wheelchair lift leading up to the Speaker's rostrum.

=== Environment ===
Langevin leans to the left on environmental and energy issues in Congress. Environmental issue groups have generally given him high ratings; he received a 97% rating from the League of Conservation Voters in 2011. He has also received a rating of 100% from the Defenders of Wildlife Foundation. Conservative issue groups concerning the energy and the environment have given him very low ratings. He is a strong supporter of alternative energy from oil and coal, voting against the Stop the War Against Coal Act of September 2012, and has supported measures for new wind farms in New England. He has praised these developments, saying wind farm "development holds great promise for Rhode Island and the country to have more stable and cleaner energy resources, while boosting our economy by presenting an opportunity to build a manufacturing base for these turbines and create quality jobs in the Ocean State."

In 2011, Langevin strongly opposed the Energy Tax Prevention Act, which would limit the EPA's ability to regulate carbon outputs. Calling it the "Dirty Air Act", Langevin said that in passing this act, the U.S. would be "turning back the progress we have made to protect our health under the Clean Air Act", adding that the passage of the bill would be "continuing our nation's addiction to foreign oil." Moreover, he has fought for more environmental regulations that he believes will help Rhode Islanders live healthier lives, saying that "protecting the environment is a matter of pride."

== Political campaigns ==
Langevin was first elected to the United States House of Representatives in 2000, defeating perennial candidate Robert Tingle for a seat that was left open when Representative Robert Weygand ran for the U.S. Senate. He took office in 2001, representing Rhode Island's 2nd congressional district. He has been reelected with relative ease ever since, defeating independent Rodney Driver in 2006 and Republican Mark Zaccaria in 2008.

2010

In 2010, he defeated Zaccaria again.

2012

Langevin was reelected with 55.7% of the vote, defeating Republican nominee Michael Riley and Independent Abel Collins, an environmental activist.

== Personal life ==
Langevin is Roman Catholic.

Party political offices
Preceded by Kathleen Connell	Democratic nominee for Secretary of State of Rhode Island; 1994, 1998	Succeeded by Matt Brown
Political offices
Preceded by Barbara Leonard	Secretary of State of Rhode Island; 1995–2001	Succeeded by Ed Inman
U.S. House of Representatives
Preceded by Robert Weygand	Member of the U.S. House of Representatives from Rhode Island's 2nd congressional district 2013–2023	Succeeded by Seth Magaziner
U.S. order of precedence (ceremonial)
Preceded by Dutch Ruppersberger as Former U.S. Representative	Order of precedence of the United States as Former U.S. Representative	Succeeded by Harold Ford Sr. as Former U.S. Representative
