= Catharine R. Williams =

American writer (1787-1872)

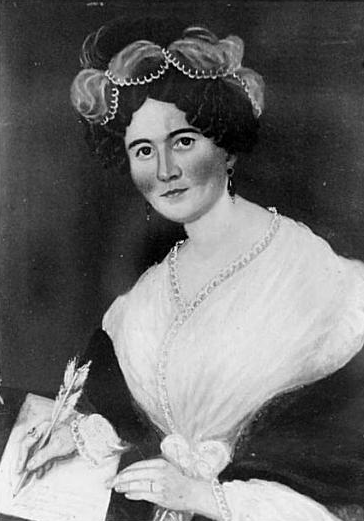
- Painting c. 1835 by Susannah Paine
- Born: Catharine Read Arnold; December 31, 1787; Providence, Rhode Island
- Died: October 11, 1872 (aged 84); Providence, Rhode Island
- Occupations: poet, writer
- Years active: 1828–1845

Catharine R. Williams (December 31, 1787 – October 11, 1872) was a Rhode Island writer and poet and a leading figure in the Dorr Rebellion in support of universal suffrage. In 2002, she was inducted into the Rhode Island Heritage Hall of Fame.

== Early life ==
Catharine Read Arnold was born on December 31, 1787 in Providence, Rhode Island to Alfred Arnold, a sea captain, and Amey Read. Her ancestors were prominent members of Rhode Island families, who had distinguished themselves in the American Revolution and in the state government. Her grandfather on her paternal side was Oliver Arnold, who had served as Rhode Island Attorney General. Arnold's mother died when she was a child and due to her father's voyages, she was raised in the care of two aunts. When she was twenty-three years old, one of the aunts married and the other died, leaving Arnold to make her own way. While visiting friends, she met Horatio N. Williams, a descendant of Roger Williams. They married in 1824, in New York and settled in the western part of the state. Williams gave birth to a daughter and after two years, in an unhappy marriage, left her husband to return to Rhode Island.

== Career ==
When she first returned to Rhode Island, Williams opened a school, but the rigors of operating it caused her health to decline. Prompted by friends, she published a volume called Original Poems in 1828. After its warm reception, she began writing again and published a prose story, "Religion at Home" in 1829, followed by a collection of stories called Tales, National and Revolutionary in 1830. Williams completed Aristocracy, a satirical novel, which was published in 1832 and then the History of Fall River the following year. In 1835, she issued a second series of Tales. Williams then penned the biographies of General William Barton and Captain Stephen Olney in a work called The Biography of Revolutionary Heroes, which was issued in 1839. The following year, she traveled through the British provinces collecting materials for a book, Neutral French: The Exiles of Nova Scotia which was published in 1841. Williams believed that her work had inspired Henry Wadsworth Longfellow to write his epic poem on the Acadians, Evangeline (1847); though others claim it was Nathaniel Hawthorne who gave Longfellow the idea. Williams' last works were called the Annals of the Aristocracy of Rhode Island, published in two volumes. The first appeared in 1843 and the last was published in 1845. Afterward, she lived on the proceeds of her earlier twelve works.

Having established a name for herself through her writing, Williams moved in the upper circles of society. She had begun a correspondence with Thomas Wilson Dorr around 1842 and was fully in favor of his suffrage party. Williams was an important supporter willing to use her influence. She raised funds and passed along information to him when Dorr was in exile, after the Dorr Rebellion. Williams saw the work of the Rhode Island Suffrage Association, which had no intention of granting enfranchisement to women, but rather wanted to remove the property requirement for male voters, in much the same light as religious reform. Good must conquer evil and the hypocrites and pharisees must be defeated. In her own words, Williams proclaimed that the two things she was most averse to were "kingcraft and priestcraft". Williams held weekly meetings of suffrage women in her home to discuss politics. When Dorr was finally seized and imprisoned, the suffrage ladies worked for his release, becoming a "powerful and visible" force in early Rhode Island politics.

Around 1848, Williams moved to Brooklyn, New York to care for the aging aunt who had raised her. When her aunt died three years later, leaving Williams an inheritance of $10,000, she returned to Rhode Island and built a cottage for herself and her daughter in Johnston. Shortly before her death, tiring of country life, Williams returned to her home in Providence, where she died on October 11, 1872. She left a completed manuscript of a story entitled Bertha, A Tale of St. Domingo, which had not been published. Posthumously, in 2002, Williams was inducted into the Rhode Island Heritage Hall of Fame.
