= Ida Silverman =

Jewish philanthropist (1882–1973)

- עידה סילברמן
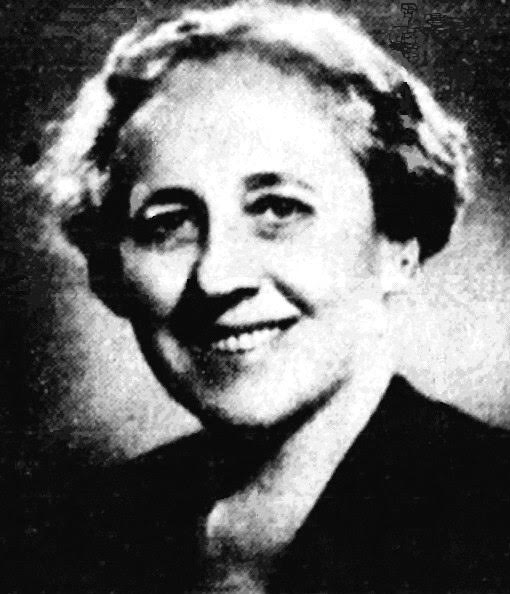
- Ida Silverman in 1957
- Born: Ida Marcia Camelhor; 31 October 1882; Kovno, Russia (now Kaunas, Lithuania)
- Died: 1 November 1973 (aged 91); Herzliya, Israel
- Other name: Ida Kamelhorn
- Years active: 1915—1973
- Known for: Zionist orator and fund-raiser
- Spouse: Archibald Silverman
- Children: 4

Ida Silverman (Hebrew: עידה סילברמן; 31 October 1882 – 1 November 1973) was a Jewish philanthropist, who with her husband helped found approximately 100 synagogues, mostly in Israel. She is the only woman to have served as vice president of the Zionist Organization of America and the American Jewish Congress.

A Russian immigrant, Silverman arrived in the United States before she was a year old. Her family settled in Providence, Rhode Island, where she completed her schooling, married, and had four children. While doing relief work during the First World War, she became aware of the depth of social problems and the effects of war on refugees. Joining the Zionist movement in the 1900s, within a decade she became a motivational speaker, advocating for the establishment of a permanent Jewish home in Palestine.

Between 1925 and the late 1940s, she logged over 600,000 air-miles traveling throughout the world, speaking and fund raising for the creation of a Jewish state. Even during World War II, she received special permission to travel into war-torn areas to evaluate conditions. At the war's end, Silverman turned her efforts toward building infrastructure in the new nation of Israel, but was also involved in philanthropy in her home state of Rhode Island, raising funds for hospitals and mental health organizations.

She received many honors and awards for her philanthropy including Jewish Mother of the Year, the Mizrachi Women's Organization of America's "Silver Medal" for building Israel, honorary doctorates, and jointly with her husband was inducted into the Rhode Island Heritage Hall of Fame in 1971.

== Biography ==
Ida Marcia Camelhor was born on 31 October 1882 in Kovno, Russia to Mary (née Dember) and Louis Camelhor (also noted as Lieb Kamelhorn). She was the only surviving child of a family of eight. Before her first birthday, her parents immigrated to New York and then when she was around ten years old, they moved to Providence, Rhode Island. She attended public grammar school and high school and, at sixteen years old, went to work as a bookkeeper for Archibald Silverman. Archibald, also an immigrant, had begun his career as a designer of costume jewelry. Together with his brother, Charles, he established the Silverman Brothers jewelry company in Providence in 1897. After two years of working in the jewelry business, Camelhor agreed to marry her boss; they wed in 1900.

Archibald continued to work his way up and eventually became president of a bank and a philanthropist for Jewish causes. Though Ida was the spokesperson and "presence" of the causes in which the couple were involved, Archibald fully supported her participation and gave his time, moral support, and monetary contributions to further their philanthropy. He also understood and accepted that her work for others would always take precedence over her own household duties.

== Career ==
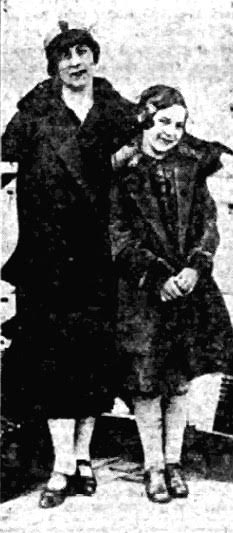
Ida Silverman and daughter 1925

By age 20, Silverman had two children, and would soon have two more. She was involved in the community of Providence and social betterment programs. She founded and served as president of the Ladies Auxiliary of the Jewish Orphanage of Rhode Island. By 1906, she was involved in the American Zionist Movement and rose to the national position of vice president of the Hadassah Women's Zionist Organization of America. Relief work during World War I awakened her to the broad variety of social needs and she became an advocate of health care, poverty relief, and finding a permanent solution for Jewish refugees. In 1915, Silverman founded the second Hadassah chapter in New England in Providence. She was a "skilled propagandist", developing a wide following between 1915 and 1919, and was known as a vigorous leader and talented orator.

Her first acknowledgement on the national level was her appointment in 1919 to honorary vice president of the American Jewish Congress (AJC). Traditionally, the AJC leadership were more focused on European Jews than worldwide outreach and were of the aristocratic, wealthy, Reform tradition. By 1919 the organization had become more diverse and while not necessarily embracing the more radical aspects of Zionism, leaders allowed Zionist views to be expressed. Silverman, as an honorary official, could use the status to her advantage: while not officially speaking for the organization, she tacitly had AJC endorsement and was able to parlay that into support from the masses for causes and monetary contributions from elites.

=== 1920s ===
In 1925 Silverman made her first trip to Palestine and was able to use her experiences to gain speaking engagements in a variety of venues. Throughout the remainder of the 1920s, Silverman served as vice president of the Zionist Organization of America and vice chair of the hospital building fund for the Hebrew University. In addition to her national organizational work, Silverman was vice president of the New England Zionist Region, the New England Conference of Hadassah, and an honorary president of the Hadassah Organization in Providence. She is the only woman to have served as vice president of the Zionist Organization of America and the American Jewish Congress.

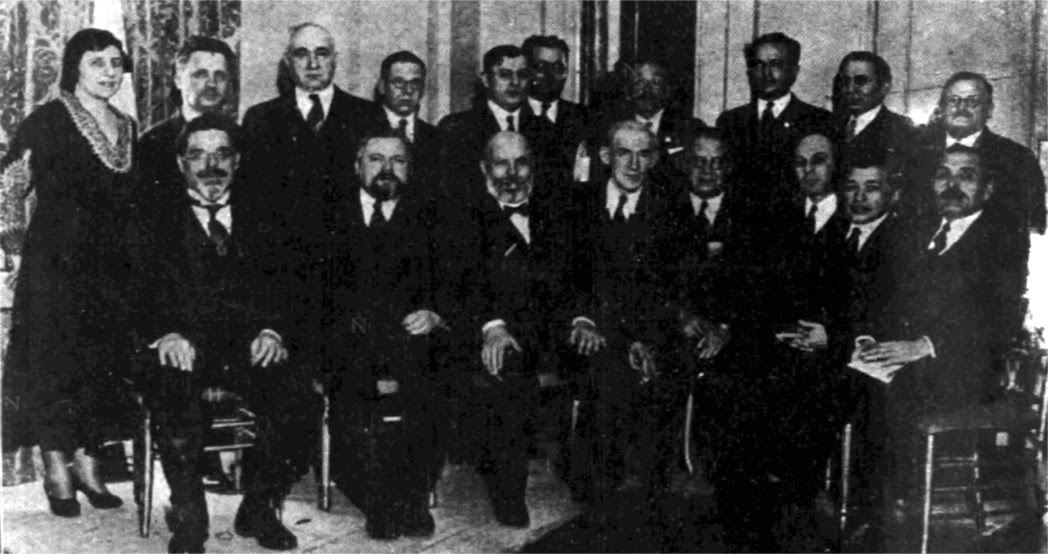
Ida Silverman National Jewish Fund

Silverman was an outspoken proponent for Israeli statehood, traveling throughout the Americas and Europe advocating for a Jewish homeland. She depicted the Jews who had resettled in Palestine as simple farmers, seeking an agrarian life to alleviate the hunger they had experienced elsewhere. Silverman stressed that the settlers' intent was not to industrialize and vie with the international powerhouse nations, but simply to provide for their basic needs. Throughout 1927 and 1928, her itinerary included a speaking engagement in Savannah, Georgia with Sir Wyndham Deedes, prior chief secretary of Palestine; a tour of hospitals, clinics and public health programs in the Holy Land to determine how Hadassah could improve the health of the entire region, "without regard to race or creed"; and attendance at the World Zionist Congress in Basel, Switzerland. Silverman resigned from Hadassah in 1928 in a policy dispute over the high salaries being paid to administrators rather than using the funds for charitable works.

=== 1930s ===
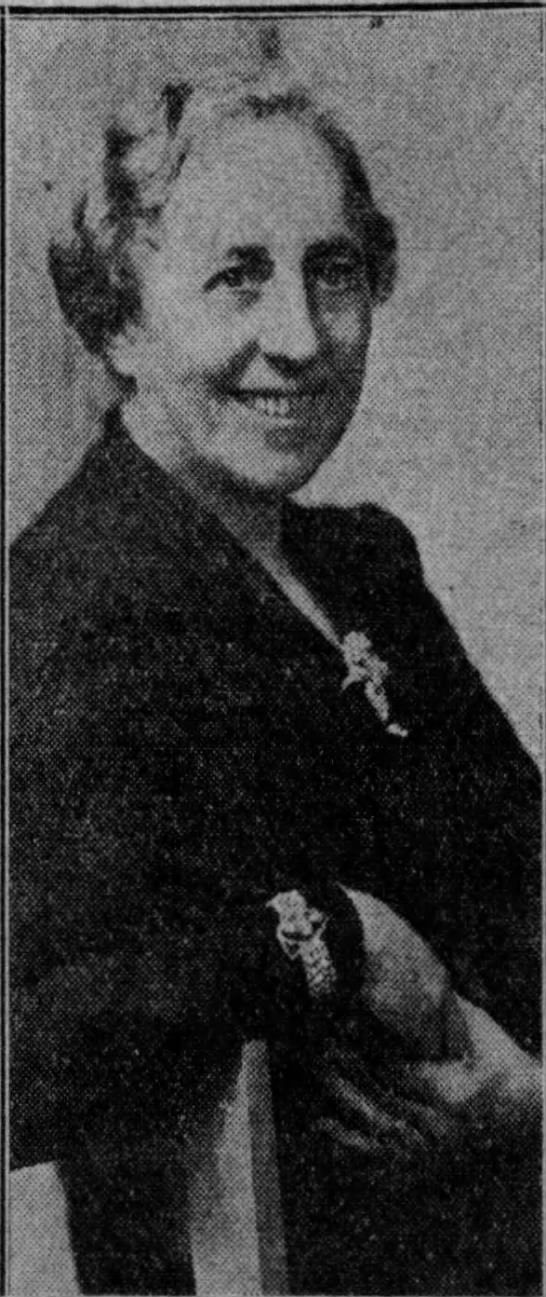
Silverman in 1938

Despite the Great Depression, Silverman's travels expanded in the 1930s, when she began spending 6 months each year outside the U.S. As early as 1932, land purchase programs to buy and settle refugees on permanent homes in Palestine were being pursued by Jewish organizations. Silverman not only supported the plans and raised funds for them, but she planted the first tree in the colony at Wady Havarith. With Hitler's rise to power, Silverman's pleas for a safe haven for Jews became more urgent and her first-hand reports from Germany, Austria, Hungary, Czechoslovakia, Lithuania, and Poland contained explicit accounts of conditions. In 1938, Silverman was working with the Youth Aliyah Movement in conjunction with Hadassah in the U.S. to relocate 10,000 refugee children to Palestine. As a fund-raiser, Silverman's goal was to raise a quarter of a million dollars for resettlement and youth training in agricultural and vocational pursuits. In 1939, she ended her Polish tour studying the conditions and desperation, shortly before the Polish invasion, but the effort was successful in relocating some 7,000 young people from Poland, Germany, Czechoslovakia, and Romania to Palestine before the end of 1940.

=== 1940s ===
Because riots had broken out in the late 1930s over British proposals to partition Palestine, and U.S. diplomats including Sumner Welles proposed American alternatives, Silverman embarked on several tours of South America and the Caribbean in the early 1940s to determine if, as an alternative to Palestinian resettlement, European Jews could be established in the Dominican Republic, Peru, or Uruguay. She reported on her findings at the Inter-American Conference in Baltimore, describing the alternatives as unfavorable and the attempt in the Dominican Republic, as a "failure". She also wrote articles under the byline Mrs. Archibald Silverman, urging the emigration of Jews to Palestine rather than to other places – such as a Jewish colony in Sosúa, Dominican Republic, promoted by the American Jewish Joint Distribution Committee in the early 1940s; a plan to settle Jews in the Kimberley region of Australia; and another proposal for a Jewish colony in Paramaribo, Suriname. Her articles were filled with vitriol against what she perceived as the "schemes" of Jewish organizers opposed to Zionism; in a 1948 article titled "The Surinam Nightmare", she "described 'diabolical plans' to abandon Jewish 'guinea pigs' to 'terrifying tropical diseases'". Eventually the alternative emigration plans were scrapped in the wake of the 1948 declaration of independence by the State of Israel.

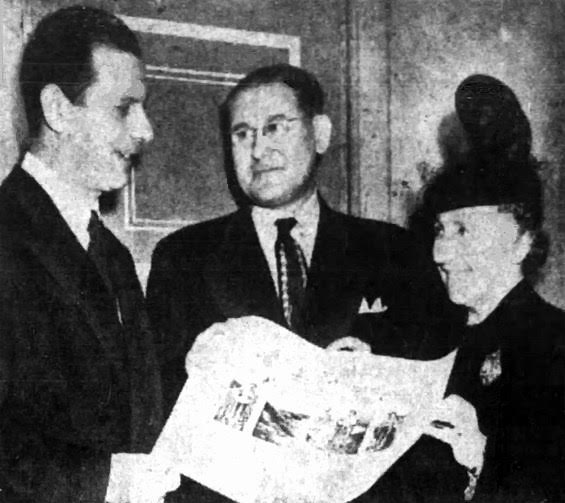
Ida Silverman presenting a scroll to Israeli Defense Minister Joseph Jacobsen

After the Inter-American Conference in Baltimore, Silverman continued her travels in South America and then obtained special permission to travel through England, Scotland, and Ireland to raise money. Her collections were a resounding success, which she attributed to the acute understanding of homelessness experienced by British citizens who had been displaced during bombing raids. Anticipating the war's end, Silverman increased efforts to buy land in Palestine, believing that if Jewish organizations owned land, when the Peace Conference occurred, bargaining would be in their favor.

As the war was ending in 1945, Silverman was on the road, traveling through all the countries of Central America, in South America, New Zealand, Australia, and South Africa on fund-raising missions. Then in 1946, she was in Europe visiting refugee camps in Sweden and Occupied Germany, before returning to Palestine. By the end of the war, she had traveled 600,000 air-miles having visited every state in the United States, each province of Canada, Mexico, all of the countries in Central and South America, the West Indies, almost all of Western Europe, parts of Eastern Europe, Australia, New Zealand, Iran, Palestine, Morocco, and South Africa.

=== 1950s and 1960s ===
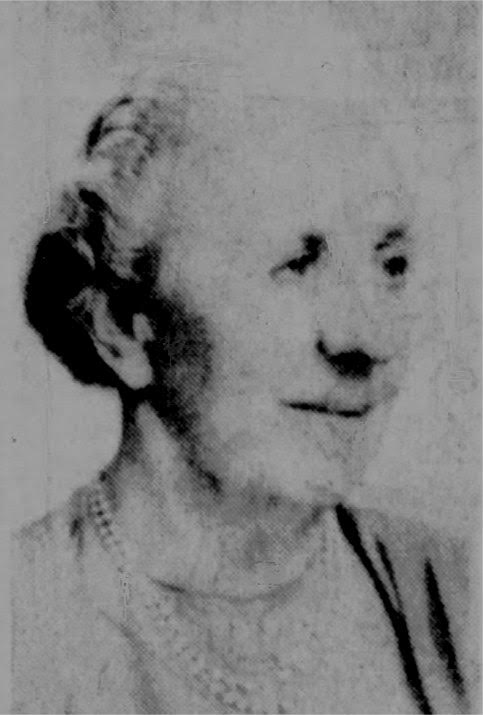
Ida Silverman in 1960

After the State of Israel was established, Silverman recognized the diverse needs to build the nation and she and Archibald channeled funds into planting orchards, building the Sharon Hotel, and supplementing the Synagogue Centre Building Fund. The Sharon Hotel, built in Herzliya, on the Sharon Plain, was part of an effort to build infrastructure and develop tourism sites to stimulate further growth. Silverman founded and served the board of the company which created the hotel. In the Jezreel Valley, she chaired a water development company and established a mixed-fruit orchard of around 70 acres of trees. She also was involved in several projects in Rhode Island. In 1955 she founded and served as president of the Friends of Butler Hospital in an attempt to reopen the health center, which had been shut down. They were successful in proving its benefit to the community and the hospital reopened. In 1957, Silverman served as chair of the fundraising for the Rhode Island Association of Mental Health. By the early-1960s, 33 synagogues throughout Israel had been built through the synagogue fund. During the two years she lived in Israel, she helped erect around 80 additional synagogues and by the time of Silverman's death, the number was over 100 synagogues in Israel and elsewhere.

=== 1970s ===
In 1971, at the age of 89, Silverman immigrated to Israel. She died on 1 November 1973 in Herzliya, Israel and was buried in the Mount of Olives Jewish Cemetery near Jerusalem.

== Honors and awards ==
In 1951 Silverman was honored as Jewish Mother of the Year by the Jewish National Fund, which established a forest in Israel bearing her name. In 1953, a village in Israel, Nachlat Ida, was named in her honor to recognize her years of financial and moral support, and in 1954, she was honored as Rhode Island Mother of the Year. She received an honorary doctorate from Rhode Island College in 1954 and one from Bryant College in 1960. In 1964, she was awarded the Mizrachi Women's Organization of America's "Silver Medal" for having done the most to build Israel.

Silverman and her husband (who had died in 1966) were jointly inducted into the Rhode Island Heritage Hall of Fame in 1971.
