= Jane Stuart =

American painter (1812–1888)

- Born: 1812 (Note: She may have been born as early as 1808.); Boston, Massachusetts
- Died: April 27, 1888 (Note: Obituaries, like that by the Detroit Free Press, state that Stuart died on April 28, 1888, but her headstone identifies the date of death as April 27, 1888.); Newport, Rhode Island
- Resting place: Common Burying Ground, Newport, Rhode Island; 41°29′47″N 71°18′56″W
- Occupation: Painter
- Known for: Portraits
- Parent: Gilbert Stuart

Jane Stuart (1812 – April 27, 1888) was an American painter, best known for her miniature paintings and portraits, particularly those made of George Washington. She worked on and later copied portraits made by her father, Gilbert Stuart, and created her own portraits. In the early 19th century, she assumed the responsibility of supporting her family after her father's death. She first worked in Boston, but later moved to Newport, Rhode Island, where she was the first woman who painted portraits. In 2011, she was inducted into the Rhode Island Heritage Hall of Fame.

== Early life ==
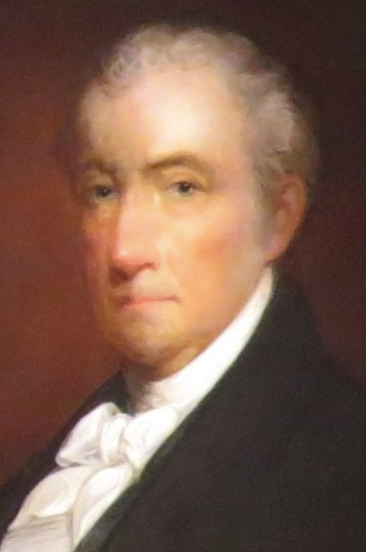
Gilbert Stuart, by Jane Stuart, Gilbert Stuart Birthplace and Museum. Another portrait, c. 1825-1828, she made of her father is held at the Rhode Island Historical Society.

Jane Stuart, born in 1812 in Boston, Massachusetts, was the youngest child of renowned painter Gilbert Stuart and Charlotte Coates Stuart, who was 13 years his junior and "exceedingly pretty". They were married about September 1786.

The Stuarts had twelve children, five of whom died by 1815 and two others died while they were young, perhaps born after Jane. The known names of the children include Charles Gilbert, Jarvis, Emma, Elizabeth, Anne, Carlisle, Agnes Blagrove, and Jane. Charles had artistic and dramatic talent, Elizabeth was a published writer, and Carlisle was noted for his agreeable disposition and died in 1820, possibly from tuberculosis. Anne lived to 68 years of age, and Elizabeth married a man named Benjamin Stebbins. (Note: Elizabeth married Benjamin Stebbins, but there was confusion about this due to the family monument at the Common Burial Ground in Newport, Rhode Island stated that one of the children was Emma Stebbins, incorrectly inferring that it was Emma that married Stebbins.) There were no descendants from the family.

Gilbert Stuart had mental illness for years, but was able to keep it hidden. The children had aspects of a traditional childhood, playing musical instruments and telling stories, but also were subject to a life of emotional turmoil.

== Career ==
=== Early years and education ===
When they want to know if a puppy is of the true Newfoundland breed, they throw him into the river; if true, he will swim without being taught.

—Gilbert Stuart, response about why he did not teach his daughter to paint.

Gilbert Stuart believed that true talent did not need instruction, so he did not give his daughter lessons. Instead, Jane learned painting skills by watching him and copying his style, and through lessons by instructors or her brother Charles. She was kept busy by her father grinding paints and filling in backgrounds of his paintings. Stuart later said that she would have preferred it if her father had given her training.

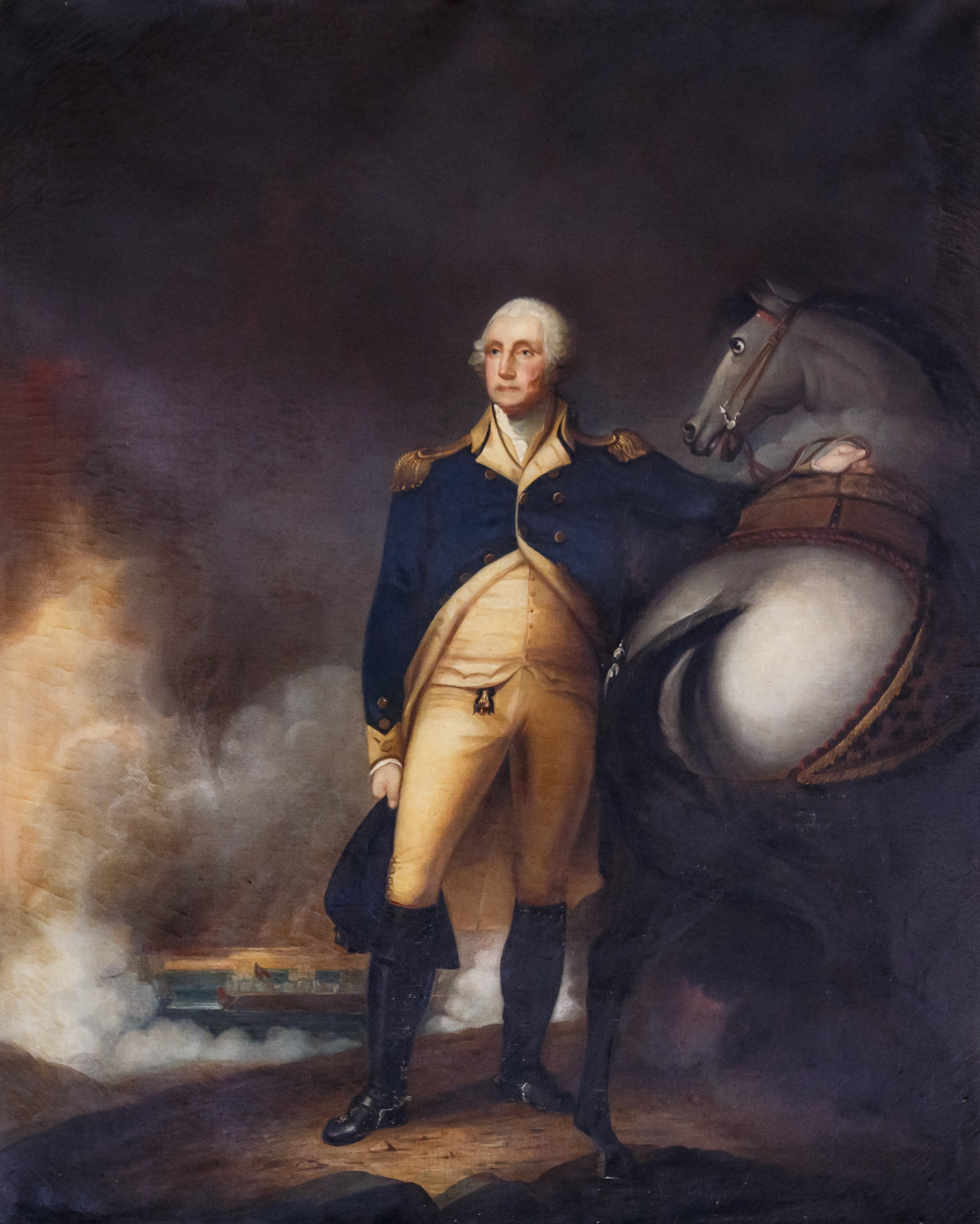
Jane Stuart's version of "Washington at Dorchester Heights" at Newport's Old Colony House

She completed many of her father's partially finished paintings and made her own paintings. Affectionately called "boy" by her father, she was considered by him to be a better painter than he was at the same age. He wanted to, but was unable to, send her to London to study with George Downey. About 1820, she made a portrait of George Washington. It is held at the Kemper Art Museum of the Washington University in St. Louis. Also in 1820, Jane Stuart painted a copy of her father's "Washington at Dorchester Heights," which resides in the Old Colony House in Newport, Rhode Island.

Her father died in 1828. He was not good at managing money and when he died, his family was left in extreme poverty. The Boston Athenæum held a benefit exhibition of 250 his works in August 1828 in an effort to provide financial aid for the family.

Stuart opened a studio in Boston and began working as an artist to support her family. Three of her siblings—Elizabeth, Emma and an unnamed brother—were committed to psychiatric hospitals following her father's death.

=== Established career ===
After 1828, she received commissions to make dozens of miniature and full-sized paintings after the popular works created by her father, especially replicas of her father's portraits of President George Washington (1732–1799). Her painting of Washington, patterned after one made by her father, exhibited her skill as an artist, capturing light and depicting facial features and expression. Her paintings were so skillful that the paintings have been confused with the originals by art dealers. She also made paintings after other artists. She exhibited her works at the Boston Athenæum beginning in 1827 and often exhibited her works there and at the National Academy Museum and School in New York City until 1870.

Aside from copying works of others, she also created her own portraits and paintings, which reflected her personal style. She was said to be among the city's best portrait painters based upon her exhibit at the Academy of Fine Arts.

She studied painting in New York. In 1833 she exhibited at the New York Academy of Fine Arts. Besides earning money as a painter, Stuart was also an art teacher. In 1834, she painted Scene from a Novel or a Subject from Literature, now owned by Vanderbilt University in Nashville, Tennessee. She lived in New York between 1840 and 1842, and exhibited her works at the American Academy.

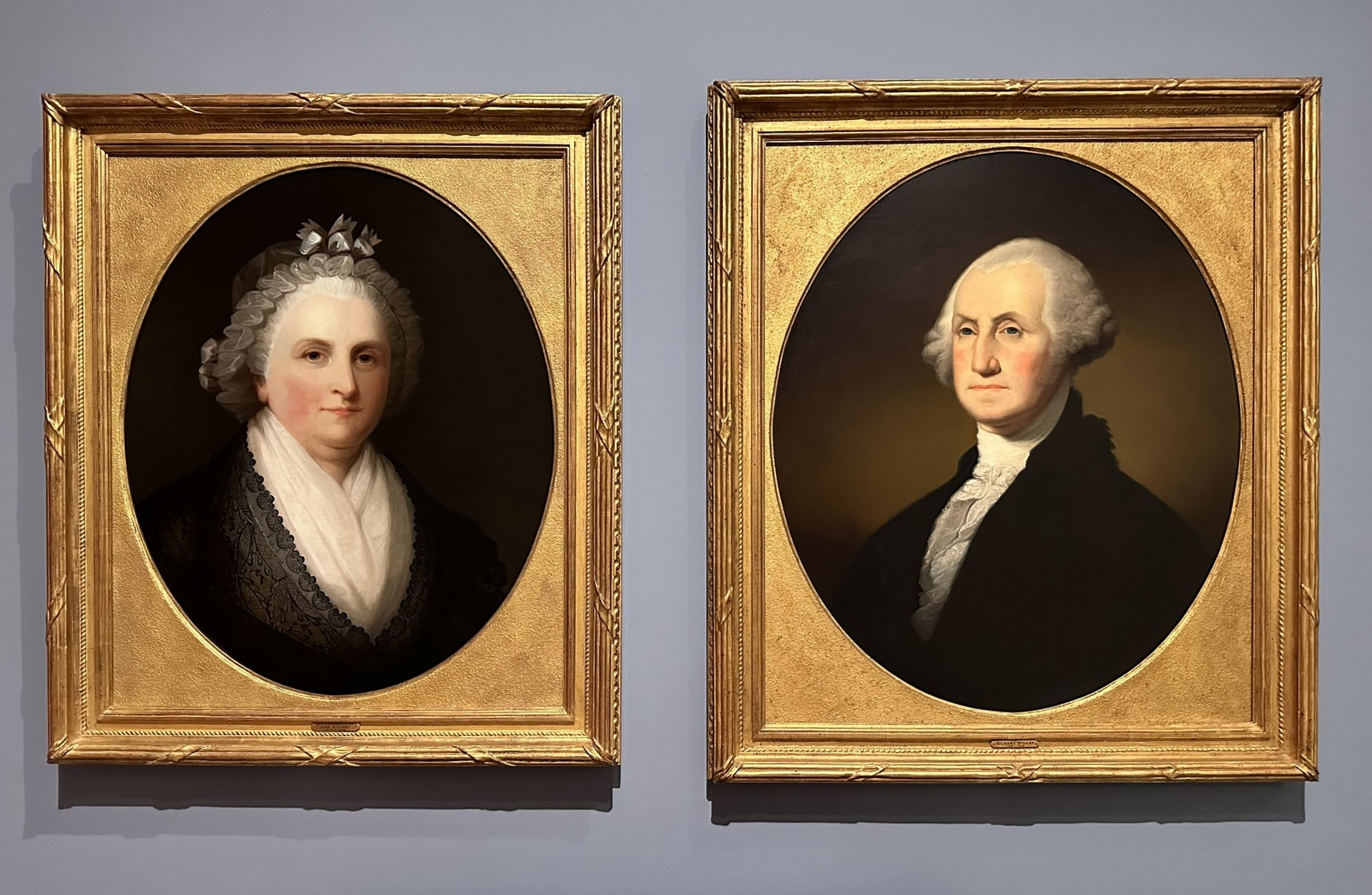
Martha and George Washington, painted by Stuart around 1850

She and her father both worked on a portrait of Oliver Hazard Perry that is held at the Toledo Museum of Art. The museum stated that "Gilbert Stuart was notorious for leaving paintings unfinished and completed only the head. His talented 16-year-old daughter Jane finished the sky, body, and uniform after her father’s death." Her painting A Portrait of Commodore Oliver Hazard Perry belonged to Brown University in Providence, Rhode Island until 1980. It was among nine portraits of prominent Rhode Island men that were given in 1857 to the university. It is now among the collection of the Birmingham Museum of Art.

She continued to paint from the 1850s, including making paintings from daguerreotypes. Over her career, she also made religious and genre paintings.

Some of her paintings are Lady Macbeth that has been among the collection of the Morris Museum; The Fortune Teller; Morning, Noon and Night that has been held by the New Britain Museum of American Art, and Costume of Charles the Second's Reign (1876). Her portraits from this period include Alicia Boylston in the collection of the Museum of Fine Arts, Boston and one of her portraits of George Washington, which is held at the Harvard Art Museums. A portrait by her of Thomas Jefferson is at the Strawbery Banke Museum in Portsmouth, NH.

Stuart wrote three articles about her father for Scribner's Monthly between June 1876 and July 1877. She struggled financially, but kept up appearances during the Gilded Age of Newport by selling her father's or her paintings to by-passers.

== Personal life ==
She was a brilliant woman in every respect. Distinguished men and women gathered about her, and in the summer season her pretty cottage was thronged. She was prominent in all literary circles, and her reputation for wit and brilliance extended far outside the limits of New England.

—"Miss Jane Stuart, A Noted Character, Expires at her Newport Home", Detroit Free Press

Stuart remained unmarried throughout her life, but was a matchmaker for others. She was a noted socialite, known for her "droll wit and fascinating personality", like that of her father. Intelligent and playful, she enjoyed dressing up in costumes and playing charades.

Three of her siblings—Elizabeth, Emma and an unnamed brother—were committed to psychiatric hospitals following her father's death.

In 1831, the family moved to Newport, Rhode Island, while she also continued to have a studio in Boston. At this time, she supported her mother and three sisters. Her mother died in 1847 at 77 years of age. In August 1858, many of her paintings were destroyed when her studio burned. She then established a studio in her family home in Newport, Rhode Island. She acquired the house at 86 Mill Street in Newport in 1863.

After a brief illness, she died on April 27, 1888. She is buried at a family monument at the Common Burying Ground in Newport, Rhode Island.

== Legacy ==
Noted as the first woman portraitist of Newport, she was inducted into the Rhode Island Heritage Hall of Fame in 2011. Some of her works are among the collection of the Gilbert Stuart Museum. An exhibit of her and her father's original works was held at the Gilbert Stuart Museum in Saunderstown, Rhode Island from June to October 2016. Her works included in the exhibition included two portraits she made of her father, and portraits of George and Martha Washington.

Her artists file and photographs of her works—acquired from curators, art galleries, and dealers—are held at the Photograph Archives of the Smithsonian American Art Museum and the Library of the Smithsonian American Art Museum and United States.

== Gallery ==
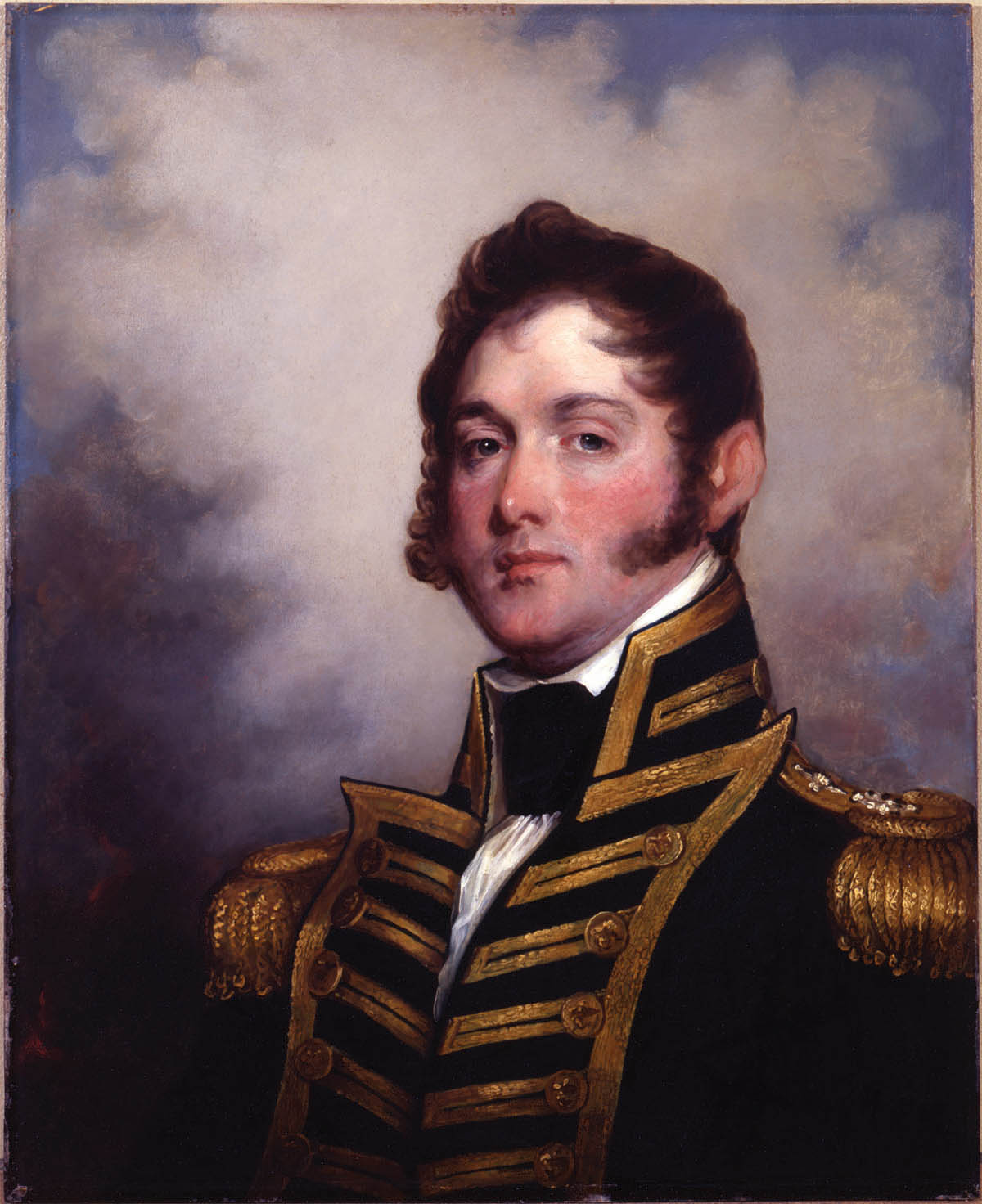
"Portrait of Oliver Hazard Perry", Toledo Museum of Art

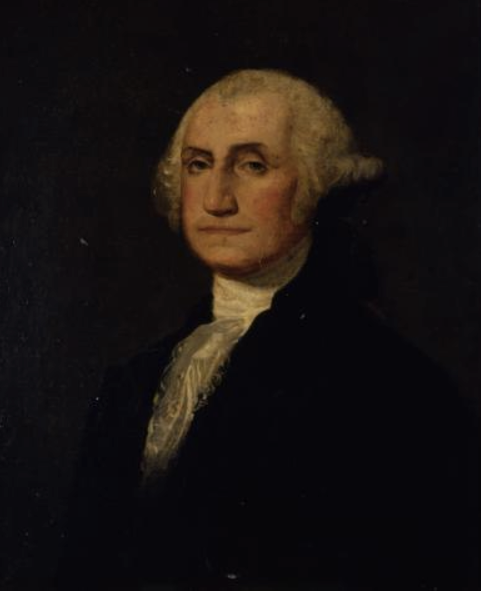
George Washington, circa 1820, Kemper Art Museum, Washington University in St. Louis

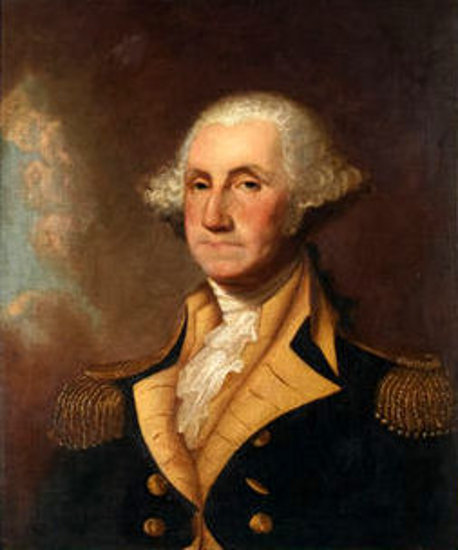
George Washington

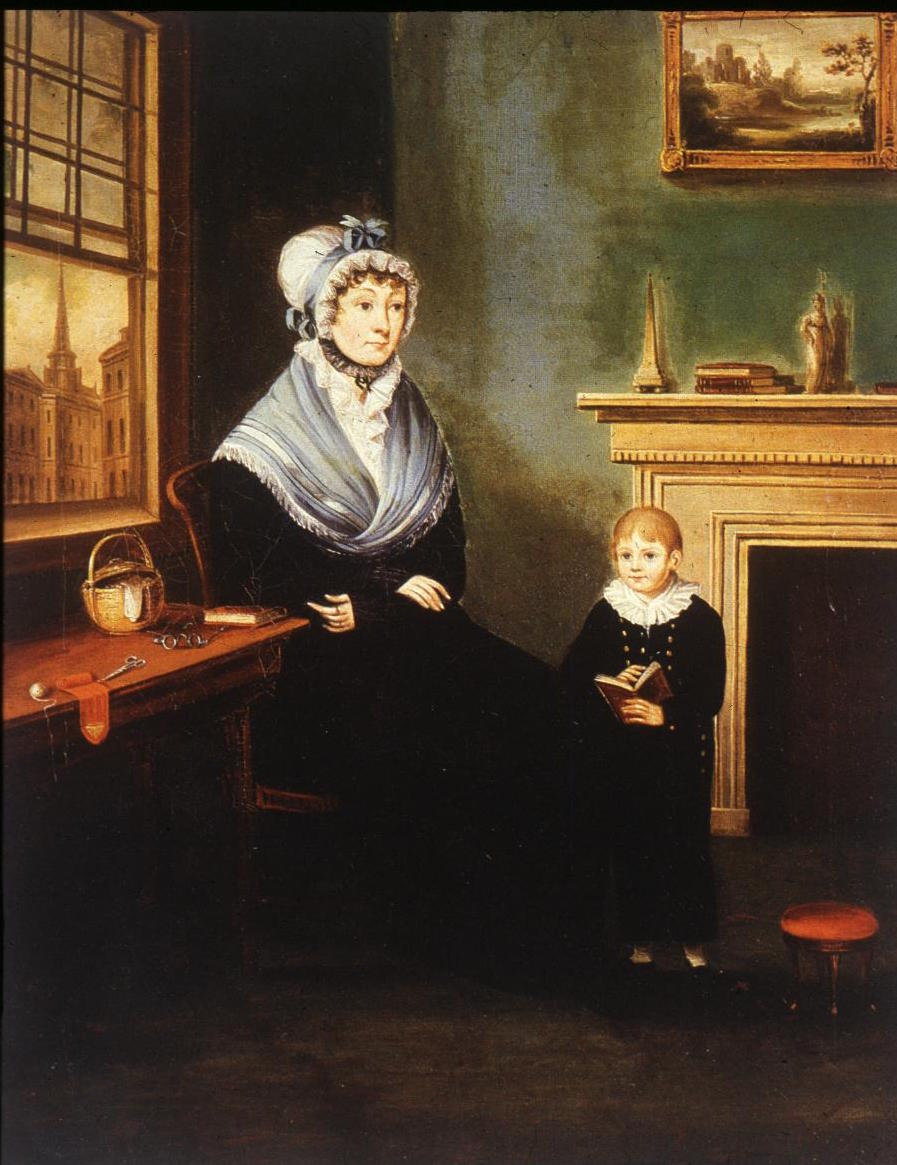
"Interior Scene" of mother and son at lesson, c. 1835, Boston, Massachusetts

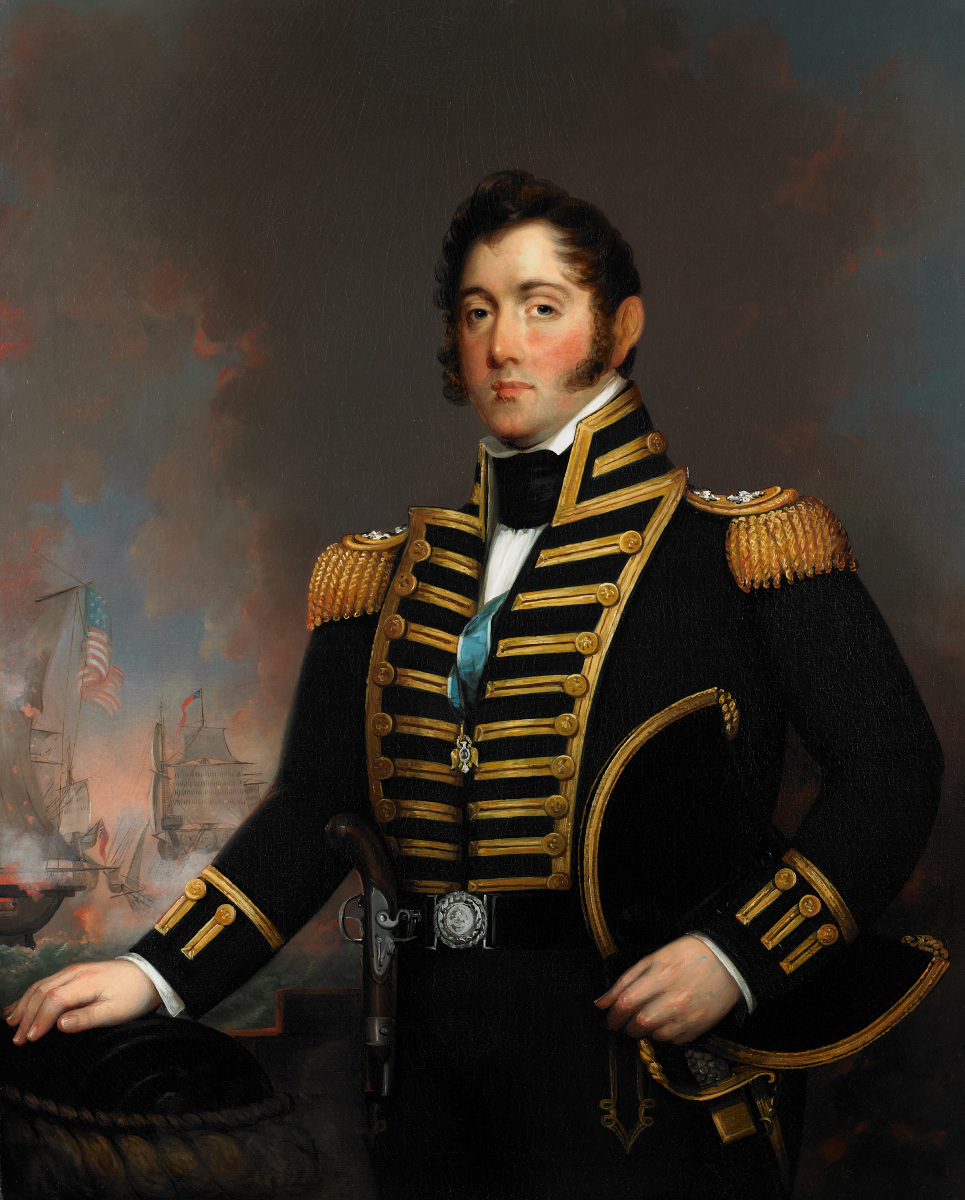
Oliver Hazard Perry, c. 1857

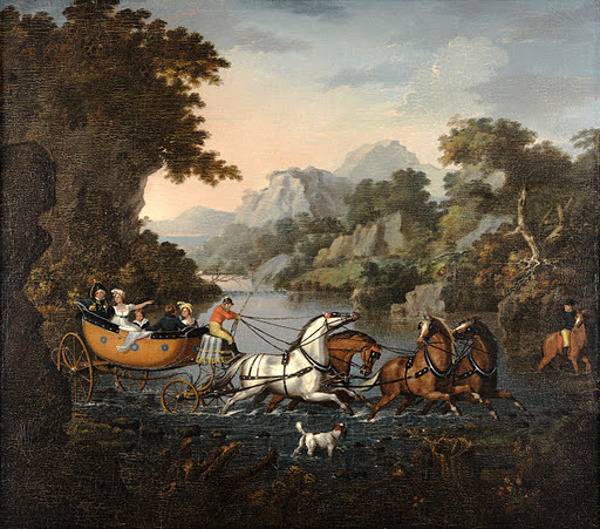
Coach Fording a Stream, c. 1825-1830, Wadsworth Atheneum, Hartford, Connecticut

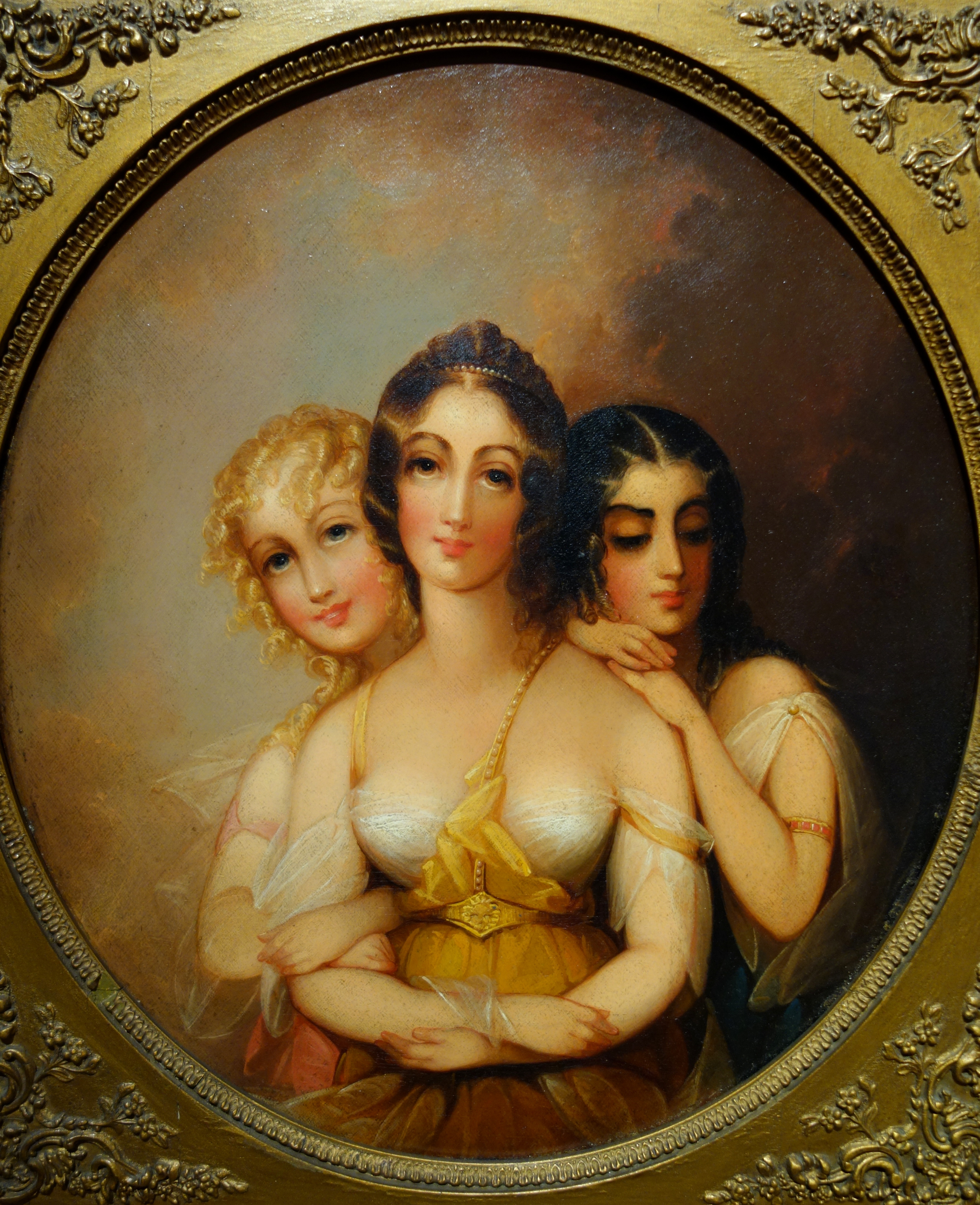
Morning, Noon and Night, c. 1830-1860, oil on wood panel, New Britain Museum of American Art

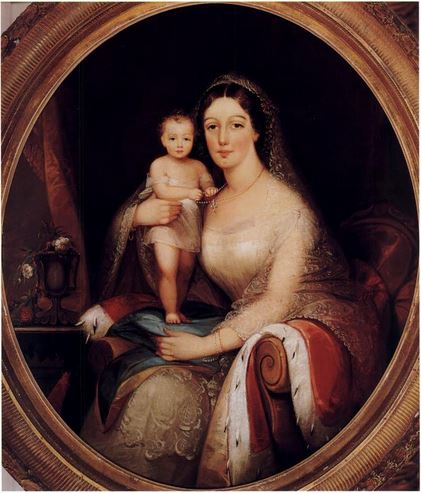
Anita Chartrand Little
