= Billie Ann Burrill =

American physical education and dance teacher

Billie Ann Burrill (March 11, 1921 – March 3, 2010) was a physical education and dance teacher at Rhode Island College, where she co-founded the Rhode Island College Dance Company. As the college's fencing coach, she organized the New England Women’s Intercollegiate Fencing Association. She was also a world-class competitive masters swimmer who set multiple world records, all after the age of 64. She was inducted into the Rhode Island Heritage Hall of Fame in 2013.

== Biography ==
Billie Ann Burrill was born in Joliet, Illinois. In World War II, she served in the Women’s Army Corps (1943–47), rising from private to captain. When the war ended, she went to Boston University for her B.A. and Smith College for her master's degree.

After teaching briefly at the University of Connecticut and at Connecticut College, she got a job in 1954 at Rhode Island College in the Department of Health and Physical Education, where she taught folk dance and golf. She also coached the fencing team, a role that prompted her to organize the New England Women’s Intercollegiate Fencing Association, of which she was president for a time.

Burrill cofounded the Rhode Island College Dance Company and served as its director (1956–59). She developed expertise in lighting, production, and stage management and spent seven summers at the American Dance Festival as production stage manager. She worked as business manager for the Paul Taylor Dance Company during it early years.

In 1980, she retired from Rhode Island College. Around that time, she took up swimming as therapy for arthritis pain and developed into a world-class masters swimmer, setting 7 world swimming records, all after the age of 64. She won nearly 300 gold medals and set individual age-group world records in the 800-meter freestyle and the 1500-meter freestyle (age group 65-69). The latter record remained unbroken for more than two decades. In 2007, aged 86, Burrill won an All-American title in the 50-yard freestyle (age group 85–89). She was inducted into both the Rhode Island Aquatic Hall of Fame and the International Scholar-Athlete Hall of Fame.

She died 2010 and was inducted into the Rhode Island Heritage Hall of Fame in 2013.
