= June Rockwell Levy =

American philanthropist

June Rockwell Levy (1886 – 1971) was an American philanthropist who was inducted into the Rhode Island Heritage Hall of Fame alongside her husband in 1999. In 1963, she received the Order of the British Empire from Queen Elizabeth II. She was known as the "First Lady of Burrillville."

== Biography ==
June Rockwell Levy was born in Brooklyn on June 14, 1886. In 1891, she moved with her family to Bristol, Rhode Island. She studied in Paris and at Rosemary Hall, later going to the Rhode Island School of Design. On November 10, 1915, Rockwell married Austin T. Levy, a wealthy businessman. The couple built a house in The Bahamas and operated a plantation there.

She was a trustee of Lincoln School, chair of the Providence Art Club's Ladies Board, and involved in several other local organizations. She funded the construction of many buildings in Burrillville, Rhode Island.

Her husband named the June Rockwell Levy Foundation in her honor in 1947. In addition to funding scholarships to the University of Rhode Island and University of Brandeis, the foundation donated extensively to medical establishments. The University of Rhode Island awarded Levy an honorary degree.
