= Barbara Leonard (politician) =

American politician

23rd Secretary of State of Rhode Island
- In office January 2, 1993 – January 3, 1995
- Governor: Bruce Sundlun
- Preceded by: Kathleen Connell
- Succeeded by: James Langevin

Personal details
- Born: Barbara Martin; June 12, 1924 Newport, Rhode Island, U.S.
- Died: January 24, 2013 (aged 88) Providence, Rhode Island, U.S.
- Party: Republican
- Spouse: Woody Leonard
- Education: Brown University (BA)

Barbara M. Leonard (née Martin; June 12, 1924 – January 24, 2013) was an American Republican politician. She was born in Newport in 1924.

She was a candidate for the United States Senate in 1984 as a Republican, but lost to incumbent Claiborne Pell. She served as the Secretary of State of Rhode Island from 1993 to 1995 as a Republican. Leonard served on several state boards and commissions, including the Rhode Island Economic Development Corporation, the state's Port Authority and the state Advisory Committee on Refugee Resettlement.

== Death ==
Leonard died on January 24, 2013, aged 88.

Party political offices
| Preceded by James Reynolds | Republican nominee for U.S. Senator from Rhode Island (Class 2); 1984 | Succeeded by Claudine Schneider |
| Preceded by Valerie J. Southern | Republican nominee for Secretary of State of Rhode Island; 1992, 1994 | Succeeded by Ed Lopez |
Political offices
| Preceded by Kathleen Connell | Secretary of State of Rhode Island; 1993–1995 | Succeeded by James Langevin |
