= South Elmwood, Providence, Rhode Island =

Coordinates: 41.7856°N 71.4152°W

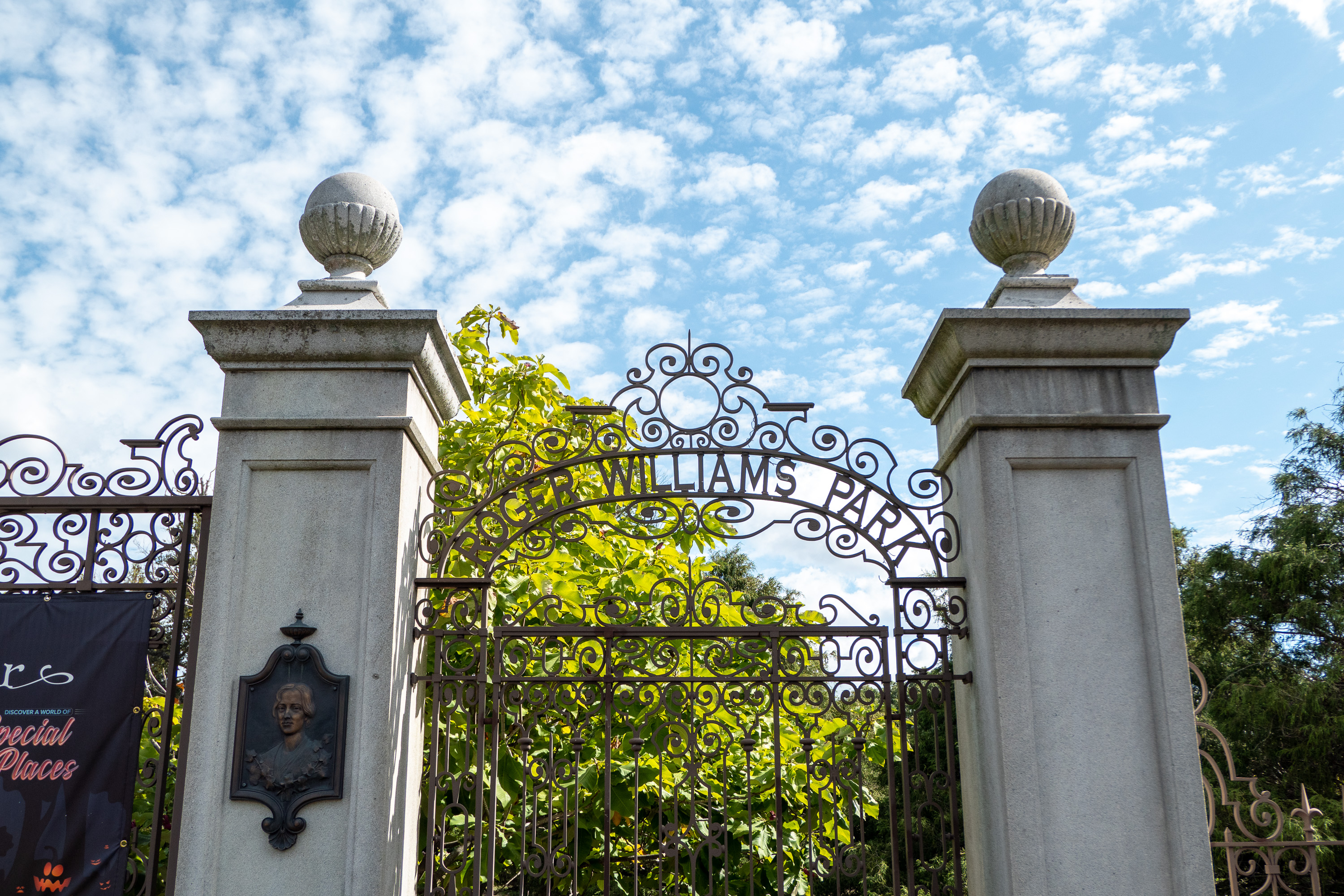
Entrance to Roger Williams Park at Elmwood Avenue

South Elmwood is the southernmost neighborhood in Providence, Rhode Island, and is home to Roger Williams Park and the Roger Williams Park Zoo. The neighborhood is bounded to the northwest by Interstate 95, to the northeast by Broad Street and Verndale Avenue, and on all other sides by the municipal boundary with Cranston. The population of the neighborhood, as of 2000, was 2,184.

== Demographics ==
For census purposes, the Census Bureau classifies Hope as part of the Census Tract 1.02. This neighborhood had 5,287 inhabitants based on data from the 2020 United States Census.

The racial makeup of the neighborhood was 19.2% (1,005) White (Non-Hispanic), 11.2% (593) Black (Non-Hispanic), 5.7% (300) Asian, 3.3% (226) from some other race or from two or more races. Hispanic or Latino of any race were 59.8% (3,163) of the population. 50.1% are foreign born, with most foreign born residents originating from Latin America (78%).

The median age in this area is 43.8 years old. Family Households made up 89% of the population, and the average household (family and non-family) had 3 persons living there. 45% of the population was married. Out of the 1,776 vacant and non-vacant housing units, 61% were owner occupied, and 39% renter occupied. The average house was worth $294,200, which is slightly lower than the average in Providence. 8.7% of residents are below the poverty line.
