= Anna Tucker =

American civil servant (1919–2012)

Anna Tucker (née Moskalyk; March 17, 1919 – February 16, 2012) was a civil servant and administrator who served as the director of the Division of Women and Children, and, later, the Director of Elderly Affairs for the state of Rhode Island. She also served as Director of the National Association of State Units on Aging (now Advancing States) and served on the board of directors for the Muscular Dystrophy Association and on the Rhode Island Women's Commission. She was inducted in the Rhode Island Heritage Hall of Fame in 1981. The Anna Tucker Women's Athletic Scholarship at the University of Rhode Island was named in her honor.

== Awards ==
- 1971, University of Rhode Island Distinguished Alumni Award
- 1980, Rhode Island Woman of the Year
- 1981, Who's Who of American Women
- 1981, Rhode Island Heritage Hall of Fame
- 1993, Robert W. McCreanor Senior Service Award, Rhode Island Department of Elderly Affairs
