= Patrice Wood =

American journalist

- Born: Rockford, Ohio
- Education: Bowling Green State University
- Occupation: TV news reporter/presenter
- Spouse: Paul Pabis

Holly Patrice Wood is an American Emmy Award-winning journalist who works as the main news anchor for WJAR, the NBC affiliate in Providence, Rhode Island. She was inducted into the Rhode Island Heritage Hall of Fame and the Rhode Island Radio and Television Hall of Fame.

Born in Rockford, Ohio, Wood received a bachelor of science degree in journalism from Bowling Green State University. She started her career reporting and presenting at WBGU-TV in Bowling Green, Ohio, WDHO-TV in Toledo, Ohio, and did internships with ABC News, the United States House of Representatives, and TIME.

Wood joined WJAR in February 1980, first as a reporter and weekend news anchor, and was promoted to the weeknight 11:00 pm newscasts in 1982. In 1988, she became anchor of the 5:30 pm edition, the new 5:00 pm hour-long newscast in 1995, and added to her duties the 6:00 report in 1997. She worked most of her tenure with longtime anchor Doug White, along with meteorologist Gary Ley and sportscaster Frank Carpano. She interviewed many personalities, such as Oprah Winfrey and Mark Wahlberg. Wood is the longest-serving female newscaster in Providence television history, with 45 years on air. According to Adoption Rhode Island, 60% of the foster children featured on her long-running segment "Tuesday´s Child" have found a new home.

In 2017, she was the commencement speaker at Roger Williams University.

== Personal life ==
Wood has two children, Stephanie and Jonathan, and is married to Paul Pabis, who is retired from WBZ-TV as the director of operations and engineering.
