= Sara MacCormack Algeo =

American suffragist and educator

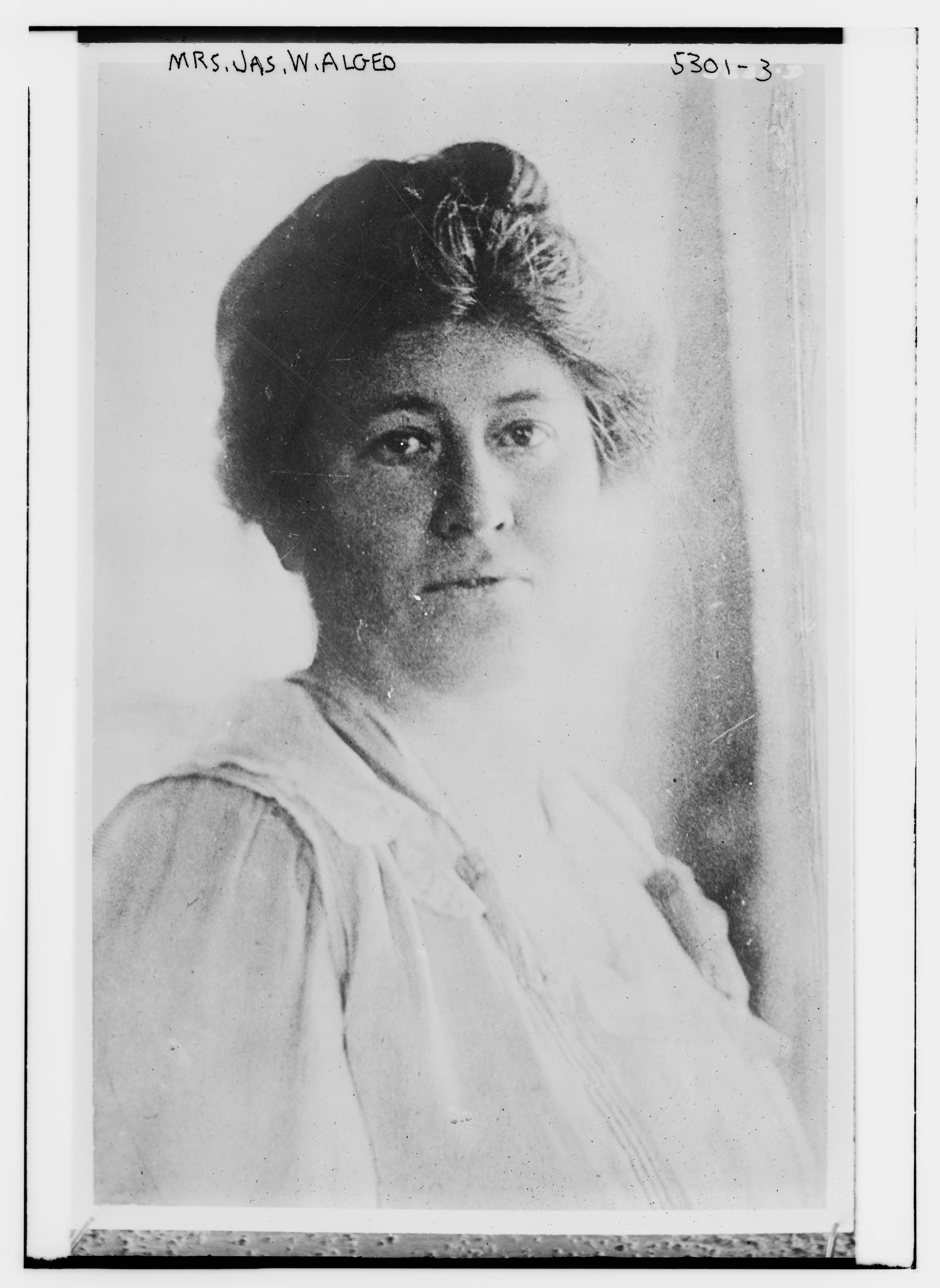
- Sarah MacCormack Algeo, from the George Grantham Bain collection, Library of Congress.
- Born: Sara Louisa MacCormack; June 13, 1876; Cohasset, Massachusetts
- Died: 1953 (aged 76–77); Barrington, Rhode Island
- Occupations: Suffragist, educator

Sara MacCormack Algeo (June 13, 1876 – 1953), born Sara Louisa MacCormack, was an American suffragist and educator.

== Early life and education ==
Sara Louisa MacCormack was born in Cohasset, Massachusetts, the daughter of James MacCormack and Sara Clements MacCormack. She earned a bachelor's degree at Boston University in 1899, and a master's degree at Brown University in 1911.

== Career ==
MacCormack taught school in Cranston, Rhode Island, from 1899 to 1907. She was chair of the Rhode Island Woman Suffrage Association, co-founder and chair of the Providence Woman Suffrage Party, and a member of the Rhode Island League of Working Women's Clubs and the College Equal Suffrage League. In 1914 and 1918 she was a speaker at suffrage events in Newport, chaired by Maud Howe Elliott.

Algeo wrote a memoir of her suffrage work, The Story of a Sub-Pioneer (1925). "I am a feminist first, last and all the time," she wrote. "It simply makes me angry through and through to see women as women imposed upon. Not a day passes without some flagrant violation of fair play toward them coming to my notice."

After suffrage was won, Algeo was first president of the Rhode Island League of Women Voters. She ran unsuccessfully for a seat in the Rhode Island state senate in 1920. She represented the National American Woman Suffrage Association at an international suffrage congress in Geneva in 1920. In 1924 she was chair of the Rhode Island chapter of the National Woman's Party. In 1932, she was a third-party temperance candidate for a seat in the United States House of Representatives.

== Personal life and legacy ==
Sara MacCormack married James Walker Algeo in 1907. She was widowed when Algeo died in 1945, and she died in 1953, in her seventies, in Barrington, Rhode Island. Her collection of suffrage postcards is in the Schlesinger Library. In 2020, she was selected for induction into the Rhode Island Heritage Hall of Fame, to mark the centenary of the ratification of the 19th Amendment.
