= Frances Knight =

Former director of the US Passport Office (1905–1999)

- Official portrait of Frances Knight, 1960
- Born: July 22, 1905; Newport, Rhode Island, U.S.
- Died: September 11, 1999; Bethesda, Maryland, U.S.
- Other name: Frances Knight Parrish
- Education: New York University
- Occupation: director of the United States Passport Office (1955–1977)
- Employer: United States Department of State
- Spouse: Warren Parrish (married 1935–1984)

Frances G. Knight Parrish (July 22, 1905–September 11, 1999), known professionally as Frances Knight, was American civil servant who served as director of the United States Passport Office from 1955 to 1977, where she enforced a highly efficient bureaucracy and promoted anti-Communist ideals by refusing passport and visa documents to those she deemed "enemy of the state". The New York Times wrote in 1975 that she had " been criticized above all for an allegedly political view of the passport". As a wealthy socialite among Washington, D.C.'s conservative circles, Knight's friends and political allies included J. Edgar Hoover of the Federal Bureau of Investigation, and the head of the House Un-American Activities Committee.

== Early life and career ==
Frances Knight was born in Newport, Rhode Island on July 22, 1905. She was raised in New York City, and graduated from Hunter College and New York University.

Knight started her career as a clerk for the Works Progress Administration in New York. She moved to Washington D. C. when her husband Wayne Parrish took a job there as editor of American Aviator Publications, and developed a reputation as a wealthy socialite. She worked in the State Department as a radio information specialist, as well as in the Bureau of Security and Consular Affairs, and additionally held roles as typist at the National Industrial Recovery Administration and public relations director of the American Retail Federation.

== United States Passport Office ==
In 1955, Knight was named director of the United States Passport Office by her predecessor, Ruth Shipley, a fellow conservative who had run the office for 28 years. Secretary of State John Foster Dulles reportedly said to Knight when she was being considered for the position, "I hear you are a controversial person", to which she replied, "So are you, Mr. Secretary. So is anybody who sticks his neck out in government." Her first actions as director were overhauling the corporate structure: consolidating divisions, coordinating field offices, and hiring additional staff to keep up with increasing volume of passport applications. The expansions continued over her tenure to meet passport demand, which grew from 500,000 passports granted in 1955 to 1.9 million in 1968, to three million in 1977. She received praise from both liberals and conservatives for office's efficiency, and The Washington Post wrote that "at the time of her retirement in 1977 the Passport Office was considered one of the government’s premier service bureaucracies."

"I was determined to prove that a government agency could be made efficient; that business management and standards could be instituted and maintained; that government employees could provide the public with interested, friendly and personalized public service," she told The Washington Post in 1960.

Knight promoted equal rights for women and was outspoken in her complaints that the high ranking State Department positions were dominated by men. She demanded that she be promoted to the highest civil service rank, G.S. 18, after 15 years at G.S. 17, and pledged to donate the $695 increase in salary to Washington Animal Rescue League, explaining "I’m fighting for a principle ... not so much for what it will do for me, but for my staff and a lot of women in lower-level jobs." She charged the State Department with sex discrimination. In 1970, Time magazine called her "a Women’s Liberation movement unto herself."

=== Political fights and controversies ===
Knight frequently attracted controversy in Congress and the media, and in 1970 Time wrote that "one of her most distinctive qualities is her relish for a good fight." She described fellow State Department officials as "soft on communism" and "gutless", and one official said, "She attacks the department, and then wants to be promoted ahead of everyone else." In some cases she used Passport Office resources to support government surveillance efforts, but she firmly denied accusations that she leaked State Department information to Joseph McCarthy.

In 1963, it was revealed that in a closed meeting with the Senate Subcommittee on Internal Security, Knight testified that Secretary of State Dean Rusk had ordered her to grant passports to "dangerous undercover Communists engaged in espionage, sabotage and sedition.'' She said this departmental policy prevented the United States from protecting itself against ''the inroads of Communism." In the mid 1960s, Knight's staff complied with FBI efforts to monitor the activities of an antiwar Harvard professor during his sabbatical in Europe, passing along information to United States Embassies in Paris and Moscow.

In 1966, Abba P. Schwartz, the liberal head of the Bureau of Security and Consular Affairs, expressed opposition to the political restrictions on passports and sought Knight's resignation. In response, Knight held a news conference in which she announced, "Some creeps are out to get me." With assistance from J. Edgar Hoover and high ranking conservatives in Congress, Knight successfully forced Schwartz to resign. Opponents of Knight nicknamed her ''the ogress''. Columnist Mary McGrory compared her to Joseph McCarthy.

=== Retirement ===
Knight remained head of the Passport Office even after reaching mandatory retirement age of 70. She received two one-year extensions, the first one sent handwritten and sent in a frame from the office of Henry Kissinger, then-Secretary of State, and develop a machine-readable plastic passport. She was forced to retire in 1977 at age 72 when she was denied a third extension by Secretary of State, Cyrus Vance. After her retirement from the federal government, Knight continued to promote immigration reform and other political issues, and advised the presidential transitions of Ronald Reagan and George H. W. Bush. In 1978, she was inducted into the Rhode Island Heritage Hall of Fame. Her manuscripts are held by the Hoover Library and Archives.

== Personal life ==
In 1935, Frances Knight married Wayne Parrish, a successful magazine publisher who became a multimillionaire. The couple moved to Washington, D.C. when he was named editor of an aviation magazine, and lived in a custom-built home on Embassy Row, where they frequently hosted gatherings of industry leaders and heads of state. During their extensive world travels, the couple built an extensive art collection, which Wayne Parrish documented in a 28-page catalog of the house and its contents. Later in life, he founded his own publication, and Knight ran its business and operations. He died in 1984.

She enjoyed repairing clocks as a hobby. In 1974, she mailed out Christmas cards that The New York Times described as "a two-page tirade against her Foggy Bottom enemies".

Knight died on September 11, 1999 at age 94, in a Bethesda, Maryland hospital, after spending the previous three years at the Carriage Hill Bethesda nursing home.

== See also ==
- Ruth Shipley
