= Beatrice Oenslager Chace =

American philanthropist

- Beatrice Oenslager, from a 1929 newspaper
- Born: Beatrice Ross Oenslager; July 26, 1905; Harrisburg, Pennsylvania, U.S.
- Died: May 12, 1992 (aged 86); Providence, Rhode Island, U.S.
- Other names: Happy Chace, Betty Oenslager
- Occupations: Philanthropist, historical preservationist
- Notable work: Co-founder, Providence Preservation Society
- Relatives: Donald Oenslager (brother); Malcolm Greene Chace (father-in-law); George Oenslager (uncle); James Cox Brady Jr. (brother-in-law)

Beatrice Oenslager Chace (July 26, 1905 – May 12, 1992) was an American philanthropist interested in historical preservation. She was co-founder of the Providence Preservation Society. She was named to the Rhode Island Heritage Hall of Fame in 1999.

== Early life and education ==
Chace was born in Harrisburg, Pennsylvania, the daughter of John Oenslager and Jane Laurie Connely Oenslager. Her father was a physician, and her uncle George Oenslager was a noted industrial chemist. Her older brother Donald Oenslager became a prolific and award-winning Broadway scenic designer, and his wife Mary Polak Oenslager was a philanthropist in New York CIty.

Chace attended the Seiler School, Cours Fenelon in Paris, Miss Hall's School in Massachusetts, and graduated from Smith College in 1928.

== Career ==
Chace bought and restored fifteen houses in Providence's College Hill neighborhood, and restored or consulted on the restoration of dozens more. She worked with Antoinette Downing to establish the Providence Preservation Society in 1956. The Happy Chace '28 Garden at Smith College is named for her. She also donated towards the art collection at Smith College. She was a trustee of Hancock Shaker Village, as was one of her daughters.

== Personal life ==
Oenslager married Malcolm Greene Chace Jr. in 1929. They had a son, Malcolm, and daughters Jane and Eliot. Chace died in 1992, at age 86, in Providence, Rhode Island. Her home in Providence is considered an example of the city's Greek Revival architecture. In 1999 she was posthumously inducted into the Rhode Island Heritage Hall of Fame.
