= Secretary of State of Rhode Island =

United States elected office and administrative division

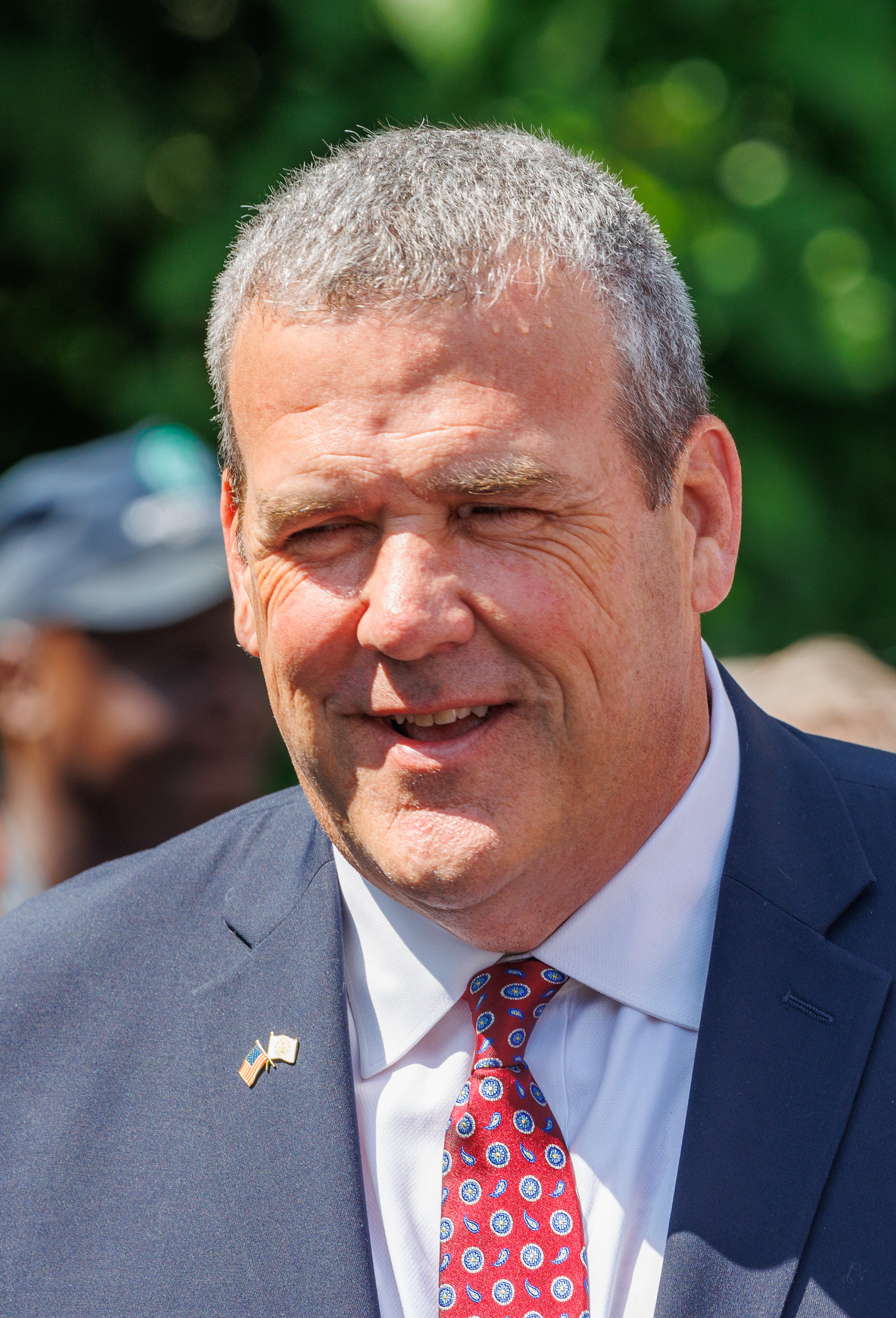
- Incumbent; Gregg Amore since January 3, 2023
- Type: Secretary of State
- Formation: 1798
- First holder: Samuel Eddy
- Website: Office of the Rhode Island Secretary of State, official homepage

The secretary of state of Rhode Island is an elected office in the U.S. state of Rhode Island. As of 2023, the current secretary of state is Gregg Amore.

== Powers and duties ==
The Rhode Island Department of State or is composed of five separate divisions:

- The Elections and Civics Division prepares ballots, ensures accessibility of voting facilities, qualifies and certifies the names of all federal and state candidates for ballot placement, maintains a database of registered voters, and ensures compliance with the Help America Vote Act. Administration of elections and compliance with campaign finance laws is the responsibility of a separate state agency, the Rhode Island Board of Elections.
- The Corporations Division is responsible for a wide range of business-related legal documents and filings, including formation of corporations and other business entities, liens and security interests under the Uniform Commercial Code, registration of notaries public, apostilles, trademarks and service marks, registration of businesses conducting games of chance, and various other documents required by state law.
- The Public Information Division accepts many filings required to be made with the secretary of state, including lobbying disclosures, public meeting notices and minutes, disclosure of state government consultants, and appointments to boards and commissions, and other government information. This division also publishes the Rhode Island Government Owner's Manual, which gives a broad overview of various government offices and officials.
- The Rhode Island State Archives is the official custodian and trustee for public records of permanent historical value.
- The Rhode Island State Library, which was created in 1852 by a General Assembly resolution as part of the office of the secretary of state. Its purpose is to assist members of the General Assembly with research on the preparation of proposed legislation. The State Library also includes a law library.

== List of secretaries of state ==
List of officeholders
Image	Name	Tenure	Party
	Henry Ward	1775–1797	
	Samuel Eddy	1798–1818	Republican
	Henry Bowen	1819–1848	Whig
	Christopher E. Robbins	1849–1850	Whig
	Asa Potter	1851–1853	Democratic
	William R. Watson	1854	Whig
	John Russell Bartlett	1855–1871	Republican
	Joshua M. Addeman	1872–1886	Republican
	Edwin D. McGuinness	1887	Democratic
	Samuel H. Cross	1888–1889	
	Edwin D. McGuinness	1890	Democratic
	George H. Utter	1891–1893	Republican
	Charles P. Bennett	1894–1909	Republican
	J. Fred Parker	1910–1923	Republican
	Ernest L. Sprague	1924–1932	Republican
	Louis W. Cappelli	1933–1938	Democratic
	J. Hector Paquin	1939–1940	Republican
	Armand H. Cote	1941–1956	Democratic
	John A. Notte, Jr.	1957–1958	Democratic
	August P. LaFrance	1959–1972	Democratic
	Robert F. Burns	1973–1982	Democratic
	Susan Farmer	1983–1986	Republican
	Kathleen S. Connell	1987–1992	Democratic
	Barbara Leonard	1993–1994	Republican
	James Langevin	1995–2001	Democratic
	Edward S. Inman	2001–2002	Independent
	Matthew A. Brown	2003–2006	Democratic
	Ralph Mollis	2007–2014	Democratic
	Nellie Gorbea	2015–2023	Democratic
	Gregg Amore	2023–present	Democratic

== See also ==
- Attorney General of Rhode Island
