= Isabelle Ahearn O'Neill =

American politician

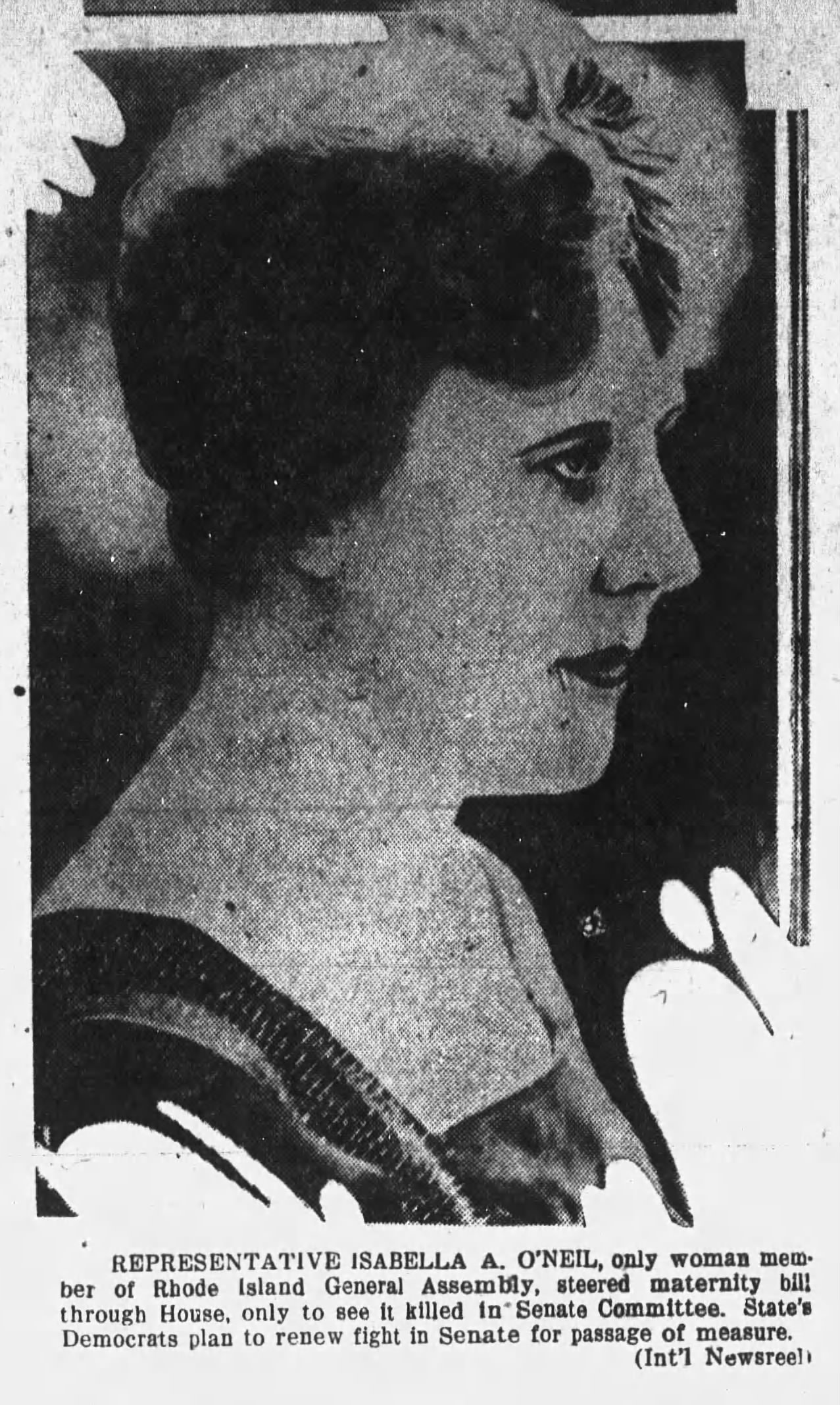

Member of the Rhode Island Senate
- In office 1930–1943

Member of the Rhode Island House of Representatives
- In office 1923–1930

Personal details
- Born: Isabelle Florence Ahearn; June 8, 1880 Woonsocket, Rhode Island, U.S.
- Died: March 17, 1975 (aged 94) Providence, Rhode Island, U.S.
- Party: Democratic
- Spouse: John Aloysius O'Neill (m. 1907, separated)

Isabelle Ahearn O'Neill (June 8, 1880 – March 17, 1975) was a stage and screen actor of the silent film era, a suffragist, and the first woman elected to the Rhode Island Legislature. She also served in the state Senate and, under President Franklin Roosevelt, in the Federal Bureau of Narcotics. She was inducted into the Rhode Island Heritage Hall of Fame in 2014.

== Early life and education ==
Isabelle Florence Ahearn was born on June 8, 1880 in Woonsocket, Rhode Island, the youngest of thirteen children of Mary J. (O'Connor) Ahearn and Daniel Ahearn. She was raised in Providence, Rhode Island, and was educated at the Boston College of Drama and Oratory. She also took physical education classes at Harvard University.

She married John Aloysius O'Neill in 1907; they had one child who died as an infant. The couple separated after three years but did not divorce for religious reasons.

== Stage and film career ==
O'Neill began her career as a teacher, founding her own Ahearn School of Elocution in 1900, at the age of 20. Her students gave recitals at the Providence Opera House. Ahearn also worked as an actor for nearly two decades (1900–18), taking both lead and supporting roles in primarily summer stock and vaudeville shows in Rhode Island and New York. In 1915, she began to take roles in silent films like Joe Lincoln's Cape Cod Stories (Joseph C. Lincoln's Cape Cod Stories) made by the Providence-based Eastern Film Corporation.

== Career in government ==
In the 1910s, O'Neill became an active suffragist and began to campaign for Democratic candidates in Rhode Island. She eventually left the stage and took her elocutionary skills into a career in politics. In 1922, she was elected to the Rhode Island House of Representatives from the 15th Assembly District, making her the first woman to hold office in the Rhode Island Legislature. She stayed in the House for eight years, supporting better protections for women in the workplace, better pay for teachers, and pensions for widows with children. A canny public speaker, she gave speeches in French and Italian to reach a broader cross-section of the electorate. She rose to the position of deputy Democratic floor leader before moving over to the state Senate in 1932. In 1924, she served as the temporary chair of the Democratic National Convention.

At the request of President Franklin Roosevelt, she left the state Senate after only two years to serve as the president's legislative liaison to the Federal Bureau of Narcotics. In 1943, she resigned and returned to her home state, where she took an executive position at the Rhode Island Labor Department.

O'Neill retired in 1954 and died in Providence on March 17, 1975. Her papers are held by the Rhode Island Historical Society and include scrapbooks from her years as an actor and elocution teacher, as well as a brief autobiographical sketch.

== Honors and awards ==
The resolution passed by the Rhode Island House of Representatives recognizing March 8, 2007, as "Women's History Day" specifically mentioned Ahearn's accomplishment in becoming the state's first woman legislator "just two short years after women gained the right to vote".

In 2011, the YWCA of Rhode Island created the Isabelle Ahearn O’Neill Award in her memory to honor the state's women leaders.

In 2014, she was inducted into the Rhode Island Heritage Hall of Fame.
