= Mary Reilly (advocate) =

Activist nun (born 1930)

Sister Mary Reilly

Personal life
- Born: December 18, 1930 (age 95) South Providence, Rhode Island
- Education: St. Xavier Academy

Religious life
- Religion: Catholicism
- Movement: Sisters of Mercy
- Initiation: September 8, 1948

Sister Mary Reilly (born December 18, 1930) is a Catholic teacher, leader, advocate, and Sister of Mercy from South Providence, Rhode Island. Reilly has been a nun for 75 years, after joining the Mercys in 1948.

Reilly is a feminist whose work focuses on the empowerment of women and girls. Reilly also participates in actions to address and end climate change and human trafficking.

== Early life ==
Reilly was born on Dudley Street, in South Providence, one of eight children, who grew up in poverty.

In 1948, Reilly joined the religious Sisters of Mercy.

== Work in Rhode Island ==
In 1970, Reilly joined the ministry team at St. Michael the Archangel Roman Catholic Church, where she met many young, illiterate mothers, who were unsupported and expressed hopelessness. This radicalized Reilly to create organizations for young, low-income mothers to access support and education.

In 1975, Reilly helped build McAuley Ministries, which provides various services to low-income people, including a housing and workforce development program for single mothers and their children. The ministries also provide around 300 meals a day to food-insecure people. McAuley Ministries was named after Sisters of Mercy founder, Catherine McAuley, who, in 1824, built a homeless shelter to support and educate poor women. As of 2018, McAuley Ministries' annual budget was $1.5 million.

In 1978, Reilly co-founded and led the Good Friday Walk for Hunger in Rhode Island. The walk is held annually and funds local, national, and international organizations in their efforts to end hunger.

In 1981, Reilly co-founded Dorca's Place, now called Dorcas International Institute of Rhode Island, a literacy and learning program for low-income adults, especially immigrant mothers. It is the largest provider of adult education in Rhode Island.

In 2001, Reilly founded Sophia Academy, a private middle school for girls from lower socioeconomic neighborhoods. Sophia Academy received full accreditation through the Association of Independent Schools of New England, who praised "their unique and comprehensive social justice program". In July 2016, Malala Yousafzai visited Sophia Academy, to showcase the school as an example of educational equity for girls from low income homes.

In 2016, YWCA Rhode Island recognized Reilly as a “Woman of Achievement”. In 2018, Reilly celebrated her 70th jubilee as a sister of mercy. In 2019, Reilly was inducted into the Rhode Island Heritage Hall of Fame for her work as a teacher, missionary, and social services pioneer.

== National work ==
In 1972, Reilly and 47 other nuns went to Washington, DC and co-founded NETWORK Nuns on the Bus, a national social justice lobby that engages nuns in community organizing. She toured 15 states with the lobby in 2013, to promote "bi-partisan, commonsense" immigration reform.

== International work ==
In the 1960s, Reilly spent six years as a missionary in Honduras and Belize, which exposed her to the crisis of poverty in developing countries, especially among women, and sharpened her "feminine consciousness".

In 1995, Reilly attended the World Conference on Women in Beijing. This helped prepare her to open Sophia Academy.
