= Daniel Granger =

Daniel Granger may refer to:

- Daniel L. D. Granger (1852–1909), U.S. Representative from Rhode Island
- Daniel Granger (Doctors), a fictional character in the British soap opera Doctors
- Danny Granger (born 1983), American basketball player
