= Mary Pray (tavern keeper) =

Colonial tavern keeper in Providence, Rhode Island (died 1686)

- Died: 1686; Providence, Colony of Rhode Island and Providence Plantations
- Occupation: Tavern keeper
- Known for: Accounts of King Philip's War
- Spouse: Richard Pray
- Children: 4

Mary Pray (died 1686) was a colonial tavern keeper in Providence, Rhode Island. She is notable for two surviving letters she wrote during King Philip's War, which historians have used as contemporary accounts of conditions in Providence during the conflict, and for holding a license to operate a public house in her own name. In 1681 the Providence Town Council granted her a tavern license signed by Roger Williams and other town leaders, making her one of the relatively few documented women licensed to keep a public house in seventeenth-century New England. When the license was renewed the following year, two townsmen protested that it had been granted to her alone rather than jointly with her husband, from whom she had previously sought a divorce.

== Family and life in Lynn, Massachusetts ==
Mary Pray's maiden name, parentage and date of birth are not recorded. She married Richard Pray (born about 1630) before December 30, 1647. The couple had four children: Ephraim, John, William and Mary.

The Prays appear several times in the records of the Essex County quarterly courts at Lynn, Massachusetts, in the late 1640s, where Richard worked as a collier for the Lynn ironworks. (Note: In 17th-century England and colonial New England, a collier was someone who produced charcoal by burning wood in large smothered mounds to fuel iron furnaces.) In March 1647/48, (Note: Dates before 1752 are given in the Old Style, with dual years for January to March (for example, "1647/48").) the court at Salem sentenced Richard for swearing (10 shillings), cursing (10s.), beating his wife (20s.), and contempt of court (40s.)—a total fine of £4—or else to be whipped at the Lynn ironworks. (Note: In 1650 sterling, a £4 fine was substantial, equivalent to 57 days of labor for a skilled tradesman or the cost of a quarter of wheat and five stones of wool (roughly £414 in 2017).) A lodger in their home, Jabish Hackett, testified that Richard beat Mary routinely, promising to "beat her twenty times a day before she should be his master." Hackett described several severe assaults, including Pray striking Mary with a heavy bedstaff, kicking her against a wall, and throwing a porridge dish at her during supper that hit her hand and wrist so hard she feared her arm was broken.

The depositions of Hackett and Richard Hood recorded that when Thomas Wiggins confronted Richard at supper about cursing and swearing on the Lord's Day, Richard denied it and threw his porridge dish at Mary after she reminded him of his actions. When someone present warned Richard that the court would not tolerate his abuse, he declared that "he did not care for the court and if the court hanged him for it he would do it." Told that the magistrates had "tamed as stout hearts as his," Richard threatened that if brought before them over his wife's abuse, "he would cripple her and make her sit on a stool, and there he would keep her." When the fine remained unpaid in February 1648/49, the court ordered that he be whipped at Lynn on a lecture day.

In February 1649/50, Mary was herself convicted by the Salem court for verbally abusing her mother-in-law (telling her "get you whom [home] you old hogge") and throwing stones at her, as well as throwing a trencher and a bone at Richard at supper after he confiscated a letter she had written to send to England. She was sentenced to receive an admonition and pay court fees of 2 shillings 6 pence.

== Providence and the liquor trade ==
By December 1652 the Prays were in Providence, where the town gave Richard leave to sell "his house & Lot." On January 3, 1652/53, Robert Coles sold "Richard Pray & Mary the wife of the said Richard Pray" his house and house lot near the town pound [now Meeting Street]. In May 1655 the colony's General Court of Commissioners appointed Roger Mowry and Richard Pray to keep the town's two houses of entertainment, each to set out a sign to notify travelers. (Note: The printed colony record gives the name as "Richard Perry"; Austin identifies the appointee as Richard Pray.)

Mary dealt in wine and liquor from at least the mid-1650s. In 1655 a search of the town found unreported wine and liquor in her possession ; the town remitted the penalty because she pleaded ignorance of the law. The town's register of imported liquor records the landing, or bringing ashore, of six ankers (casks of about ten gallons each) of sack on April 15, 1656, and nine more on May 10, 1656; Richard Pray also landed wine and liquor between 1655 and 1660. The historian Thomas Williams Bicknell names her among five people at Providence who bought and sold about 1,000 gallons of rum, brandy, wine and other liquors in 1655–56.

== Divorce petitions ==
In May 1667 Richard and Mary Pray jointly petitioned the General Assembly "for a divorce and fynall partinge, each from the other." The Assembly found that they could not show grounds that would warrant a divorce, but, "to prevent the lamentable mischiefe and miseries that may follow," permitted them to live apart, while forbidding either to remarry. At the same session it confirmed a deed of December 26, 1666, by which Richard had placed part of his estate in the hands of the Providence Town Council as trustees for Mary and her children. The deed was to keep the town from being burdened with the children if Richard and Mary, "or either of them, should in this vexatious and irreconcileable frame of spirit" leave them and "depart to some remote part." (Note: Austin dates this deed December 26, 1660; the colony record gives 1666.)

In 1672 Captain John Greene, one of the colony's Assistants (magistrates), issued a bill of divorce to Mary and Richard Pray. Acting on a complaint by George Way, the General Assembly in November 1672 condemned Greene's act, declaring its "abhorrence" that any assistant should grant a divorce, and ordered that notice of its unlawfulness be sent to every town in the colony.

== King Philip's War letters ==
On October 20, 1675, early in the war, Pray wrote from Providence to James Oliver, a Boston merchant, militia captain and magistrate. She wrote of the town's fear of the Narragansetts, condemned the "fals peac" made with them and urged a speedy expedition against them, which took place two months later. She repeated what she described as Philip's threat "that he would make us English eat one another," described the loss of crops and the slaughter of livestock, and asked Oliver for two cutlasses and sword belts for her sons, offering to pay "in fethers or sheeps wool, if I canot get mony." (Note: The editors of the Collections incorrectly suggested that the writer was "probably the wife of Ephraim Pray," who had previously been married to Benjamin Herendean. Ephraim Pray was Mary Pray's son, and it was Richard Pray who later married Benjamin Hearnden's widow.) The letter survives among the papers of John Winthrop Jr., who endorsed it "Mary Pray to Capt Oliver."

Her husband, her sons Ephraim and John, and her son-in-law Joseph Woodward were among the men who stayed in Providence during the war. The town was attacked in June 1675 and again in March 1676, and most of its houses were destroyed. In a second letter to Oliver, dated January 6, 1676/77, she wrote that only 20 of the town's 123 houses remained standing, besides the mill, and that a town once "as Rich as any town within 40 miles" was now "the poorest of al towns."

Historian Howard W. Preston, in a 1928 article in the Rhode Island Historical Society Collections, compared Pray's count of surviving houses with other contemporary accounts and concluded that it "seems to give the results of all the Indian attacks during the War" and included destruction of outlying houses.

Museum curator Dennis Carr, in Art and Industry in Early America (2016), quoted the same letter to illustrate the near-total destruction of Providence, part of his explanation of why little Rhode Island furniture made before the 1670s survives.

Historian Louise A. Breen reproduced the October 1675 letter in Daniel Gookin, the Praying Indians, and King Philip's War (2019). Daniel Gookin, superintendent of the Massachusetts Praying Indians, defended their assistance during the war, but Pray's letter took the opposite view: she complained that the colonists had been "betrayed by mens priuat intrest and trusting Indians," and passed on reports, attributed to Native informants, that Praying Indians fired "up into the tops of the trees or into the ground" rather than at the enemy and that powder Gookin supplied to them was being sold to Philip's agents. Breen wrote that the letter "attests to the gnawing fear that gripped English colonists, and the widespread conviction that their traditional leaders were either unable or unwilling to protect them." In her notes she points out that Pray mentions only the Mohegans as allies in the fighting at Nipsachuck (North Smithfield, Rhode Island) whereas Gookin credited Praying Indians who also took part.

== Tavern keeper ==
Mary Pray was keeping her own house of entertainment by 1673. On July 13, 1673, George Way had a complaint drawn up to the General Court objecting that "mary pray the wife of Richard pray" and William Hawkins Jr. were "accompanying to Geather, as they did," and asking that she "be put dovne, and nott suffered to retaile drinck, nor keepe a hovse of Entertainement, as she did." The complaint is known only from a later deposition, and its outcome, if any, is not recorded.

Under a General Assembly act of May 1680 allowing town councils to license the sale of strong drink, the Providence Town Council asked John Whipple Jr. and Mary Pray, as "ye Likelyest persons (at present) yt we have in this Towne," whether each would keep a public house for the coming year; both agreed. (Note: Henry C. Dorr dates the grant of these licenses to March 2, 1680; the license itself is dated April 27, 1681.) When they were called to sign bonds on April 27, 1681, Whipple refused, and "ye sd mary pray (she only)" was licensed. The license allowed her to keep a public house for travelers and strangers, providing "both for horse & man," and to sell beer, wine and strong liquor by retail for one year, provided she "doth not suffer any vnLawfull game to be used in yor house, nor any Evill rule to be keept therein." It was signed by Arthur Fenner, Joseph Jenckes, Roger Williams and Thomas Arnold. In place of the 20-shilling fee, the council accepted her offer to let the town hold its meetings at her house that year, and in February 1681/82 it recorded meeting "at ye dwelling of Mary Prey."

On June 16, 1682, the council granted separate licenses for another year to Whipple and to Pray, and each paid the 20-shilling fee. Thomas Olney Jr. and John Whipple Jr., who held the town's other license, entered a protest against hers "by reason it was not granted also unto her husband; but unto her only." On February 4, 1683/84, the council granted her son Ephraim "his Mothers Licence which she received of ye Councill in ye yeare 1682," to run until the following June.

In The Planting and Growth of Providence (1882), Henry C. Dorr notes that her tavern was located at the present intersection of North Main and Steeple streets. Her tavern license has since been widely cited in works on colonial drinking culture. Edward Field reproduced the license in The Colonial Tavern (1897), Esther Kellner featured her in Moonshine (1971) as an example of women "occasionally licensed to operate taverns," and Robert A. Geake cited the document in Historic Taverns of Rhode Island (2012) to illustrate how Providence "acted most vigorously against the disorderly house."

== Death ==
Mary Pray died in 1686. According to a 1693 deposition by John Whipple, on her deathbed she asked her husband to give their son William the house and lot where they lived; Richard deeded it to William in January 1686. Richard married Elizabeth (White) Hearnden, widow of Benjamin Hearnden, about 1688, and died in 1693.

== Sources ==
- Hurley, Sarah Elizabeth (2023), Iron in the New World's Veins: Government, Ironworks, and Community in the Massachusetts Bay Colony, James Madison University (Master's thesis)
- Austin, John Osborne (1887). The Genealogical Dictionary of Rhode Island: Comprising Three Generations of Settlers Who Came Before 1690 (with Many Families Carried to the Fourth Generation). Albany, N.Y.: J. Munsell's Sons – via Internet Archive.
- Bartlett, John Russell, ed. (1856). Records of the Colony of Rhode Island and Providence Plantations, in New England. Vol. 1: 1636 to 1663. Providence: A. Crawford Greene and Brother, State Printers – via Internet Archive.
- Bartlett, John Russell, ed. (1857). Records of the Colony of Rhode Island and Providence Plantations, in New England. Vol. 2: 1664 to 1677. Providence: A. Crawford Greene and Brother, State Printers – via HathiTrust.
- Bicknell, Thomas Williams (1920). The History of the State of Rhode Island and Providence Plantations. Vol. 1. New York: American Historical Society – via Internet Archive.
- Breen, Louise A. (2019). Daniel Gookin, the Praying Indians, and King Philip's War: A Short History in Documents. New York: Routledge.
- Carr, Dennis (2016). ""A Lively Experiment": Early Furniture Making of the Narragansett Bay Region, 1636–1740". In Kane, Patricia E. (ed.). Art and Industry in Early America: Rhode Island Furniture, 1650–1830 (PDF). New Haven: Yale University Art Gallery. pp. 9–33. ISBN 978-0-300-21784-1.
- Dorr, Henry C. (1882). The Planting and Growth of Providence: Illustrated in the Gradual Accumulation of the Materials for Domestic Comfort, the Means of Internal Communication, and the Development of Local Industries. Rhode Island Historical Tracts. Vol. 15. Providence, R.I.: Sidney S. Rider. OCLC 1050816903 – via Internet Archive.
- Essex Institute (1911). Records and Files of the Quarterly Courts of Essex County, Massachusetts. Vol. 1: 1636–1656. Salem, Mass.: Essex Institute – via Internet Archive.
- Felt, Joseph B. (1862). The Ecclesiastical History of New England: Comprising Not Only Religious, but Also Moral, and Other Relations. Vol. 2. Boston: Congregational Library Association and Congregational Board of Publication – via Internet Archive.
- Field, Edward (1897). The Colonial Tavern: A Glimpse of New England Town Life in the Seventeenth and Eighteenth Centuries. Providence, R.I.: Preston and Rounds – via Internet Archive.
- Geake, Robert A. (2012). Historic Taverns of Rhode Island. Charleston, S.C.: The History Press. ISBN 978-1-60949-583-1.
- Kellner, Esther (1971). Moonshine: Its History and Folklore. Indianapolis: Bobbs-Merrill.
- Massachusetts Historical Society (1871). "Mary Pray to James Oliver". Collections of the Massachusetts Historical Society. Fifth Series. Vol. 1. Boston: Massachusetts Historical Society. pp. 105–110 – via Internet Archive.
- Currency Converter: 1270–2017, The National Archives
- Preston, Howard W. (1928). "The Defenders of Providence during King Philips War". Rhode Island Historical Society Collections. 21 (2): 56–62 – via HathiTrust.
- Rogers, Horatio; Carpenter, George Moulton; Field, Edward, eds. (1892). The Early Records of the Town of Providence. Vol. 1: Being the First Book of the Town of Providence Otherwise Called the Long Old Book with Parchment Cover. Providence: Snow & Farnham, City Printers – via Internet Archive.
- Rogers, Horatio; Carpenter, George Moulton; Field, Edward, eds. (1893a). The Early Records of the Town of Providence. Vol. 2: Being the Second Book of the Town of Providence Otherwise Called the Town Old Book, the Short Old Book, the Old Burnt Book and Sometimes Called the Book with Brass Clasps. Providence: Snow & Farnham, City Printers – via Internet Archive.
- Rogers, Horatio; Carpenter, George Moulton; Field, Edward, eds. (1893b). The Early Records of the Town of Providence. Vol. 3: Being Part of the Third Book of the Town of Providence Otherwise Called the Book with Brass Clasps. Providence: Snow & Farnham, City Printers – via FamilySearch.
- Rogers, Horatio; Carpenter, George Moulton; Field, Edward, eds. (1894). The Early Records of the Town of Providence. Vol. 6. Providence: Snow & Farnham, City Printers – via Internet Archive.
- Rogers, Horatio; Field, Edward, eds. (1899). The Early Records of the Town of Providence. Vol. 15: Being the Providence Town Papers, Vol. 1, 1639–April 1682, Nos. 01–0367. Providence: Snow & Farnham, City Printers – via Internet Archive.
- Torrey, Clarence Almon (1985). New England Marriages Prior to 1700. Baltimore: Genealogical Publishing Company. ISBN 0-8063-1102-9 – via Internet Archive.
