= Edwin D. McGuinness =

Mayor of Providence, Rhode Island, US

Edwin Daniel McGuinness
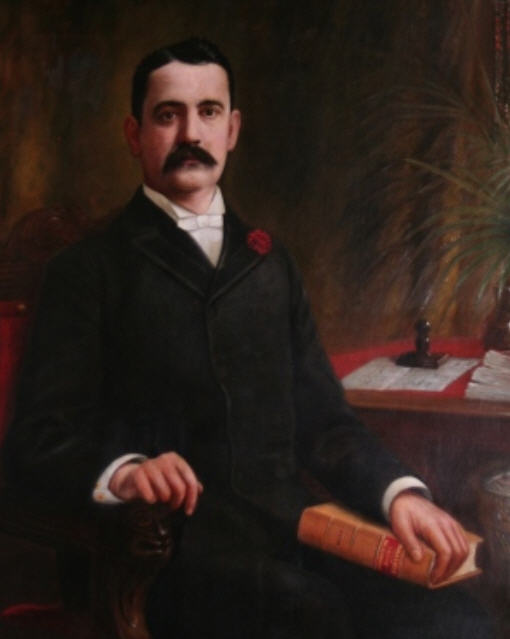

19th Mayor of Providence
- In office January 6, 1896 – January 3, 1898
- Preceded by: Frank F. Olney
- Succeeded by: William C. Baker

Personal details
- Born: May 17, 1856 Providence, Rhode Island, US
- Died: April 21, 1901 (aged 44) Providence, Rhode Island, US
- Resting place: St. Francis Cemetery, Pawtucket
- Party: Democratic
- Spouse: Ellen T. Noonan
- Education: Brown University, Boston University School of Law
- Profession: lawyer
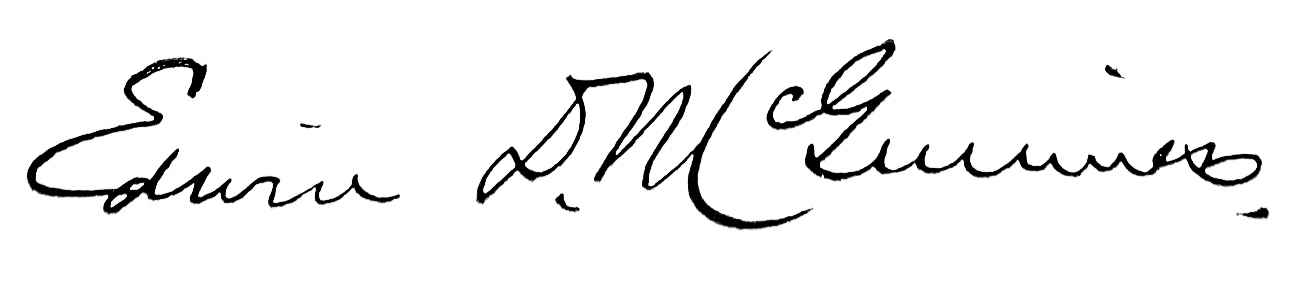
- Signature

Edwin Daniel McGuinness (17 May 1856 – 21 April 1901) was Providence's first Irish Catholic mayor.

== Personal life ==
Edwin Daniel McGuinness was born in Providence, Rhode Island, on May 17, 1856, son of Bernard McGuinness and Mary Higgins, both Irish immigrants. He attended public schools, and received a Bachelor of Arts degree from Brown University in 1877. He went on to receive his law degree in 1879 from Boston University Law School. He was admitted to the Rhode Island Bar in that same year and joined with John Doran (later a justice with the Rhode Island superior court) to form the firm of McGuinness & Doran.

McGuinness married Ellen T. Noonan of Providence on November 22, 1881. She was the daughter of Timothy and Ellen Noonan. They had one daughter.

== Political life ==
McGuinness was elected city alderman of Providence (1889 – 1893). He ran for mayor in 1893 and was defeated by Frank F. Olney; he ran again in 1895 and won. In the 1896 campaign, McGuinness carried every single election district in the city. Although he ran on the Democratic ticket, he was known for running a non-partisan administration.

A major issue during McGuinness's terms as mayor was a conflict with the New York, New Haven & Hartford Railroad Company. They had contracted to build rainsheds on their new station in Providence, but failed to fulfill this obligation. McGuinness refused to let the station open until the rainsheds were built. It was said to be a bitter fight between the mayor and the railroad.

Regrettably the political responsibility took a toll on his health and he suffered a nervous breakdown during his second term as Mayor. McGuinness took ill in 1898, and even a trip south could not restore his health.

He died at his home in Providence on April 21, 1901, at the age of 45. He was buried in St. Francis Cemetery, Pawtucket.

In 2007 he was inducted into the Rhode Island Heritage Hall of Fame.

Political offices
Preceded by Joshua M. Addeman	Secretary of State of Rhode Island; 1887–1888	Succeeded by Samuel H. Cross
Preceded by Samuel H. Cross	Secretary of State of Rhode Island; 1890–1891	Succeeded by George H. Utter
Preceded by Frank F. Olney	Mayor of Providence; 1896-1898	Succeeded by William C. Baker
