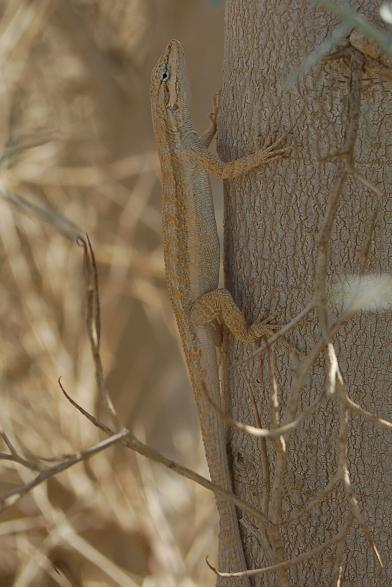

Conservation status
- Least Concern (IUCN 3.1)

Scientific classification
- Kingdom: Animalia
- Phylum: Chordata
- Class: Reptilia
- Order: Squamata
- Suborder: Iguania
- Family: Phrynosomatidae
- Genus: Urosaurus
- Species: U. graciosus

Binomial name
- Urosaurus graciosus Hallowell, 1854

Synonyms
- Uta graciosa Baird, 1859; Uta gratiosa — Boulenger, 1885; Urosaurus ornatus graciosus — Mittleman, 1942; Urosaurus graciosus — H.M. Smith & Taylor, 1950

= Urosaurus graciosus =

Species of lizard

The western long-tailed brush lizard (Urosaurus graciosus) is a species of lizard in the family Phrynosomatidae. The species is native to the southwestern United States and adjacent northern Mexico.

== Habitat and geographic range ==
U. graciosus occurs in the Mojave Desert and the northwestern Sonoran Desert in the U.S. states of California, Arizona and Nevada, and in the Mexican states of Baja California and Sonora.

== Common name ==
This species received its common name, long-tailed brush lizard, due to its tail, which is more than twice the body length, and due to its almost always being encountered on a tree or shrub.

== Behavior ==
The long-tailed brush lizard's gray or tan coloration keeps it well camouflaged against branches while it waits for insects. Unlike most other phrynosomatid lizards, which bury in the sand at night during warm weather, U. graciosus spends the night on the tips of branches.

== Identification ==
U. graciosus is distinguishable from its close relative the tree lizard, Urosaurus ornatus, by the presence of a tail more than two times its snout-vent length and the absence of a series of smaller scales running down the middle of the band of enlarged dorsal scales. U. graciosus is distinguishable from the black-tailed brush lizard, Urosaurus nigricauda, by the presence of a tail more than two times its snout-vent length and relatively large dorsal scales transitioning abruptly into granular lateral scales (in U. nigricauda, the dorsal scales are only slightly enlarged and transition gradually into the granular lateral scales). It is distinguishable from all other brush lizards (Urosaurus) by geography.

== Reproduction ==
U. graciosus is oviparous.

== Subspecies ==
Two subspecies are recognized as being valid, including the nominotypical subspecies.

- Urosaurus graciosus graciosus Hallowell, 1854
- Urosaurus graciosus shannoni Lowe, 1955

== Etymology ==
The subspecific name, shannoni, is in honor of American herpetologist Frederick Albert Shannon.
