= United States and Mexican Boundary Commission =

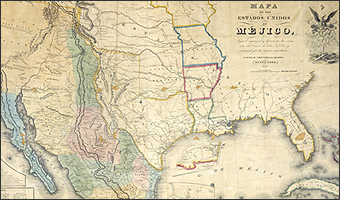
1847 Dirsturnell map of the US and Mexico

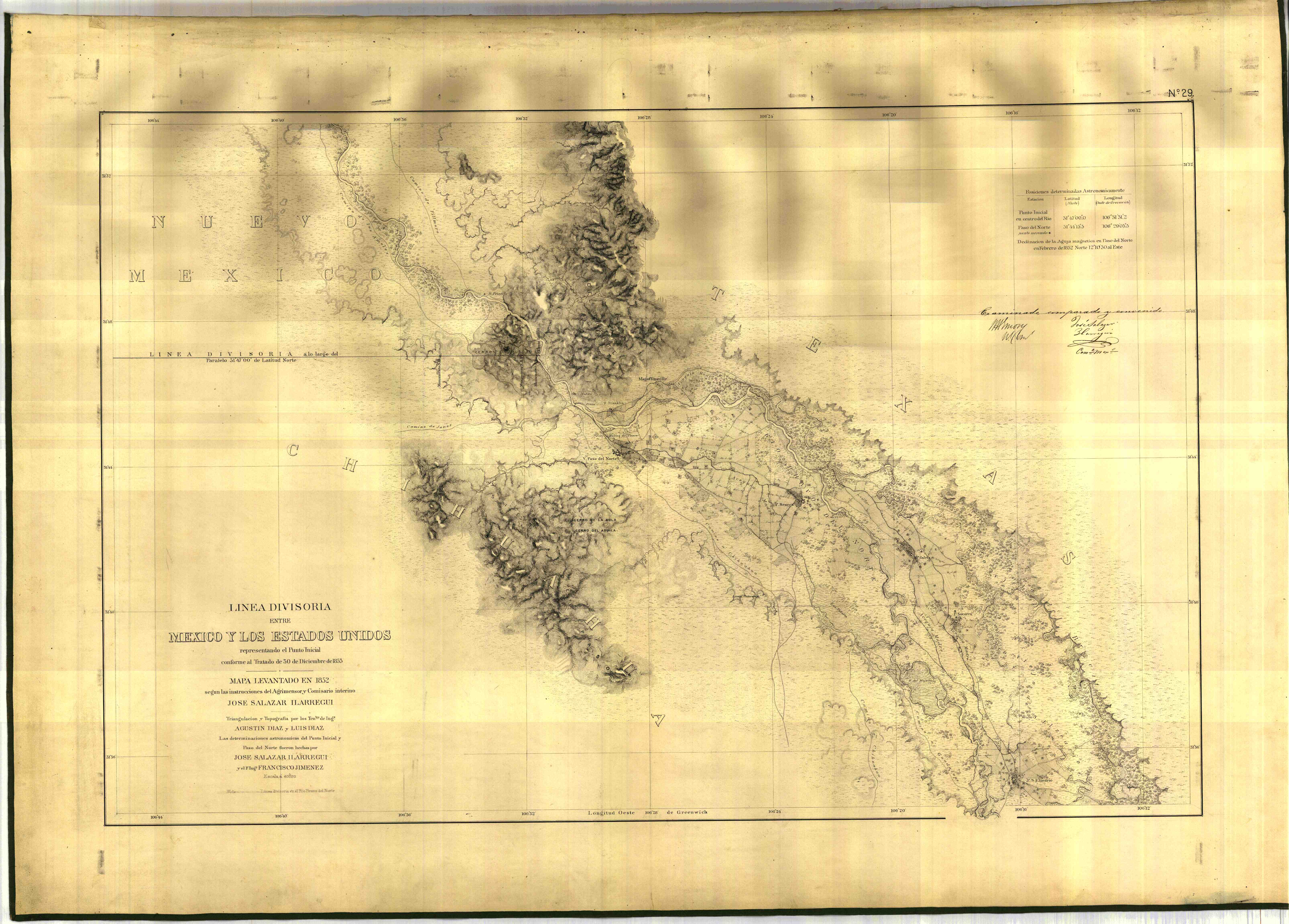
1857 map of Rio Grande/Rio Bravo border of the US and Mexico

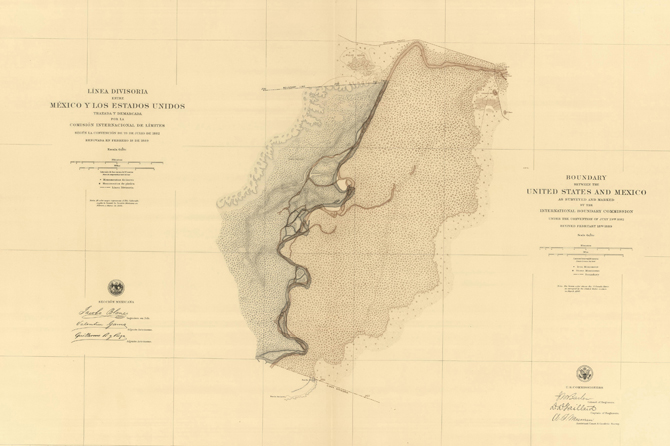
1893 map showing surveys of Colorado River by both the US and the Mexican Boundary Commissions

The Joint United States and Mexican Boundary Commission was stipulated by the Treaty of Guadalupe Hidalgo which ended the Mexican–American War in 1848. The Joint Commission was required to carefully survey and mark the new boundary which had only been imprecisely described in the treaty between the two countries.

Each country appointed a commissioner and a surveyor to jointly lead the project and the group met for the first time in San Diego on July 6, 1849. The survey was expected to take only a year, but the effort was poorly funded and fraught with internal dissension and personnel turnover, especially within the American contingent. In addition, neither country had appreciated the extremely difficult terrain through which the survey would be conducted.

The 1847 Dirsturnell map accompanied the Treaty of Guadalupe Hidalgo There were discrepancies in the map and in the Spring of 1851 the Commissioners negotiated the Bartlett-García Conde Compromise to end the dispute over where the southern border of New Mexico would be. The Compromise was rejected by the US Senate however, and a new boundary limit had to be negotiated. The Gadsden Purchase and negotiation determined that new boundary.

John Russell Bartlett replaced John C. Frémont as the US Boundary Commissioner on June 15, 1850. The Mexican Commissioner was Pedro García Conde.

List of US Boundary Commissioners

- 1. Ambrose Hundley Sevier 1848 (Died before confirmed by Senate)
- 2. John B. Weller 1849–1850
- 3. John C. Fremont February 1850 appointed but resigned to serve as senator in California
- 4. William H. Emory (interim), the only of the US Commissioners who had previous experience in "surveying, diplomacy, or organizing and carrying out a major expedition"
- 5. John Russell Bartlett June 1850 - May 1886

List of US Boundary Surveyors

- Andrew B. Gray 1849-
- Amiel Weeks Whipple 1851
- Arthur Carl Victor Schott
- James Radziminski
- Joseph Smith Harris and G. Clinton Gardner

List of Mexican Boundary Commissioners

- Pedro Garcia Conde 1849 - December 1851 (died)
- José Salazar Ylarregui 1851

List of Mexican Surveyors

- José Salazar Ylarregui 1849 - 1851
- Francisco Jiménez 1852–1853
- Agustín Díaz

== See also ==
- United States and Mexican Boundary Survey
