= Frederick A. Shannon =

American herpetologist (1921–1965)

- Born: Frederick Albert Shannon; May 4, 1921; Mount Pleasant, Iowa, US
- Died: 31 August 1965 (aged 44); Los Angeles, California, US
- Cause of death: Rattlesnake envenomation
- Resting place: Wickenburg Cemetery, Wickenburg, Maricopa County, Arizona; Plot: section 2 row O space 3
- Education: University of Illinois
- Occupations: Herpetologist and medical doctor
- Spouse: Frances
- Children: 2

Frederick Albert Shannon Jr. (May 4, 1921 – August 31, 1965) was an American herpetologist and physician. He was born in Mount Pleasant, Iowa, the son of historian Fred Albert Shannon and Edna M. (Jones) Shannon.

== Education ==
In 1939, Shannon moved to Champaign, Illinois, and began studying zoology at the University of Illinois, where he got a B.A. in zoology in 1943. He then started studying medicine and got an M.D. in 1947. He practiced for one year at the St. Joseph's Hospital in Phoenix, Arizona, before going back to Illinois for some post-graduate herpetology work. In 1949 he moved to Wickenburg, Arizona.

== Career ==
Between 1951 and 1953, Shannon was sent as a lieutenant to Korea, where although on active service in a war zone he still found opportunities to collect many reptile specimens. Back in the U.S., he published many articles on venomous snake bites, venomology, and herpetology. From 1956 on, he collected specimens mainly in Mexico.

Shannon is commemorated in the scientific names of two lizards: Sceloporus shannonorum and Urosaurus graciosus shannoni. The specific name, shannonorum, which is genitive plural, honors both Shannon and his wife.

== Death ==
Shannon died from the bite of a Mojave rattlesnake he had attempted to catch.
