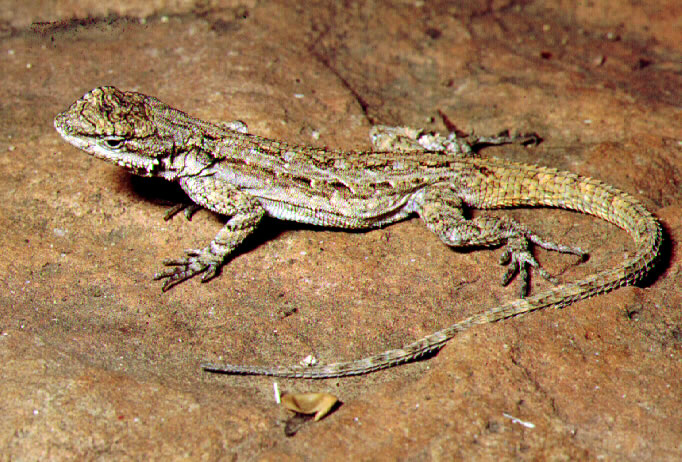
- Urosaurus ornatus

Scientific classification
- Kingdom: Animalia
- Phylum: Chordata
- Class: Reptilia
- Order: Squamata
- Suborder: Iguania
- Family: Phrynosomatidae
- Genus: Urosaurus; Hallowell, 1854

Diversity
- 8 species, see text.

= Urosaurus =

Genus of lizards

Urosaurus is a genus of lizards, commonly known as tree lizards or brush lizards, belonging to the New World family Phrynosomatidae. They are native to North America, specifically the arid and semiarid regions of the western United States and Mexico, spending most of their time on trees, shrubs, or boulders.

== Description ==
Species in the genus Urosaurus can be distinguished from members of the genus Sceloporus by the presence of a gular (under neck) fold and granular lateral scales. They can be distinguished from members of the genus Uta by the presence of enlarged (sometimes only slightly) dorsal scales. Some species of Urosaurus (Urosaurus ornatus) appear to be polymorphic for throat color, but it does vary in different populations. In male lizards, these colors can range anywhere from orange, yellow, green, or turquoise, and in females the color can be either orange or yellow. Throat color in males is also appears to be associated with certain mating behaviors including aggression, boldness, submission, and cautiousness.

== Reproduction ==
Urosaurus have been used as a model system in lizard life-history studies, and populations produce two or more clutches of eggs per year. Field studies have also shown a cost of reproduction in a natural New Mexico population of the species Urosaurus ornatus.

== Species ==
In the genus Urosaurus there are eight species which are recognized as being valid.

Image	Scientific name	Distribution
	Urosaurus auriculatus (Cope, 1871)	Socorro Island in Baja California
	Urosaurus bicarinatus (A.M.C. Duméril, 1856)	Mexico.
	Urosaurus clarionensis (Townsend, 1890)	Baja California
	Urosaurus gadovi (Schmidt, 1921)	Mexico
	Urosaurus graciosus Hallowell, 1854	southwestern United States and adjacent northern Mexico.
	Urosaurus lahtelai Rau & Loomis, 1977	Mexico.
	Urosaurus nigricauda (Cope, 1864)	southern California, Baja California,
	Urosaurus ornatus (Baird & Girard, 1852)	southwestern United States and northwestern Mexico.

Nota bene: A binomial authority in parentheses indicates that the species was originally described in a genus other that Urosaurus.
