= William C. Baker =

Mayor of Providence, Rhode Island, US

William Cotter Baker
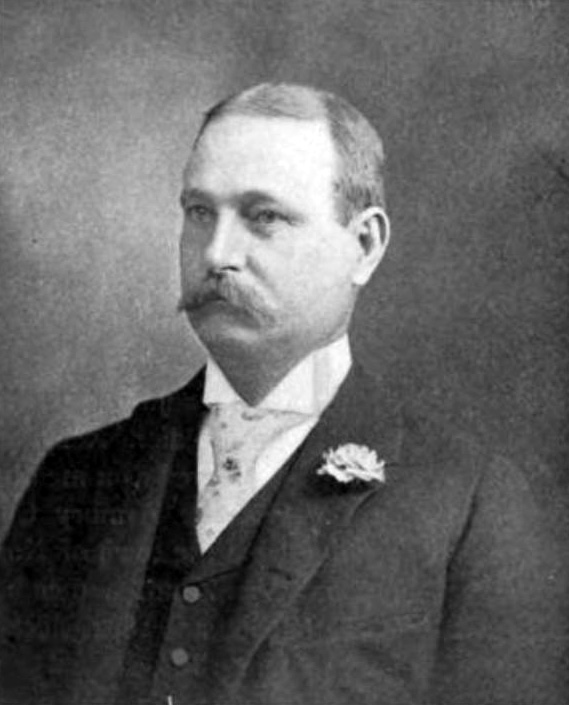
- Engraving

20th Mayor of Providence, Rhode Island
- In office January 3, 1898 – January 1901
- Preceded by: Edwin D. McGuinness
- Succeeded by: Daniel L.D. Granger

Personal details
- Born: March 15, 1858 Wickford, Rhode Island, US
- Died: 1931
- Party: Democrat
- Spouse: Sophia Metcalf
- Education: Brown University
- Occupation: Attorney

William Cotter Baker (March 15, 1858 – 1931) was a lawyer and 20th mayor of Providence, Rhode Island.

== Early life ==
William Baker was born March 15, 1858, in Wickford, Rhode Island, to David S. Baker and Mary C. Baker. He attended public schools, then East Greenwich Academy. He received his A.B. (Bachelor's degree) from Brown University in 1881.

For two years he taught languages at Deveaux College in what was then the town of Suspension Bridge (now part of Niagara Falls, New York). He was an Instructor of French and German.

In 1884 he received his A.M. (Master's degree) from Brown University. In that same year he was admitted to the Rhode Island Bar and practiced law in Providence. From 1884 to 1888, he was superintendent of public schools of North Kingstown.

On 24 May 1888 he married Sophia Metcalf, daughter of Jesse Metcalf of Providence.

By 1914, Baker was living in Pasadena, California. While there, Baker published, together with his wife, a 60-page book of poems called "The Town where I was Born: Stories of Old Wickford."

Baker died in 1931.

== Political life ==
Baker was a member of Rhode Island state House of Representatives, 1892–94, 1897-98. He was elected to three terms as mayor of the City of Providence from 1898 to 1901. He ran as a Democrat on a good government reform platform, characterized by the Providence Journal as being "in opposition to the corporations." The Journal also characterized Baker's low turnout elections as "boring".

Political offices
Preceded by Edwin D. McGuinness	Mayor of Providence; 1898-1901	Succeeded by Daniel L.D. Granger
