= Urosaurus bicarinatus =

Conservation status
- Least Concern (IUCN 3.1)

Scientific classification
- Kingdom: Animalia
- Phylum: Chordata
- Class: Reptilia
- Order: Squamata
- Suborder: Iguania
- Family: Phrynosomatidae
- Genus: Urosaurus
- Species: U. bicarinatus

Binomial name
- Urosaurus bicarinatus (A.H.A. Duméril, 1856)

Species of lizard

Urosaurus bicarinatus is a species of lizard in the subfamily Sceloporinae of the family Phrynosomatidae. The common names for this species are tropical tree lizard or roñito arborícola in Mexican Spanish. The species is endemic to Mexico. There are five recognized subspecies.

== Habitat ==
The preferred natural habitat of Urosaurus bicarinatus is forest.

== Reproduction ==
Urosaurus bicarinatus is oviparous.

== Subspecies ==
The following five subspecies of Urosaurus bicarinatus, including the nominotypical subspecies, are recognized as being valid.

- Urosaurus bicarinatus anonymorphus (Mittleman, 1941)
- Urosaurus bicarinatus bicarinatus (A.H.A. Duméril, 1856)
- Urosaurus bicarinatus nelsoni (Schmidt, 1921)
- Urosaurus bicarinatus spinosus Bumzahem & H.M. Smith, 1954
- Urosaurus bicarinatus tuberculatus (Schmidt, 1921)

Nota bene: A trinomial authority in parentheses indicates that the subspecies was originally described in a genus other than Urosaurus.

== Etymology ==
The subspecific name, nelsoni, is in honor of American ornithologist Edward William Nelson.
