= Urosaurus gadovi =

Conservation status
- Least Concern (IUCN 3.1)

Scientific classification
- Kingdom: Animalia
- Phylum: Chordata
- Class: Reptilia
- Order: Squamata
- Suborder: Iguania
- Family: Phrynosomatidae
- Genus: Urosaurus
- Species: U. gadovi

Binomial name
- Urosaurus gadovi (Schmidt, 1921)

Synonyms
- Uta gadovi Schmidt, 1921; Urosaurus gadovi — Mittleman, 1942

Species of lizard

Urosaurus gadovi, also known commonly as Gadow's tree lizard and el arborícola de Gadow in Mexican Spanish, is a species of lizard in the family Phrynosomatidae. The species is endemic to Mexico.

== Etymology ==
The specific name, gadovi, is in honor of German ornithologist Hans Friedrich Gadow.

== Geographic range ==
U. gadovi is found in the Mexican states of Guerrero, Jalisco, and Michoacán.

== Habitat ==
The preferred natural habitat of U. gadovi is forest.

== Description ==
The ventral surface of the body of U. gadovi is blue in both males and females.

== Reproduction ==
U. gadovi is oviparous.
