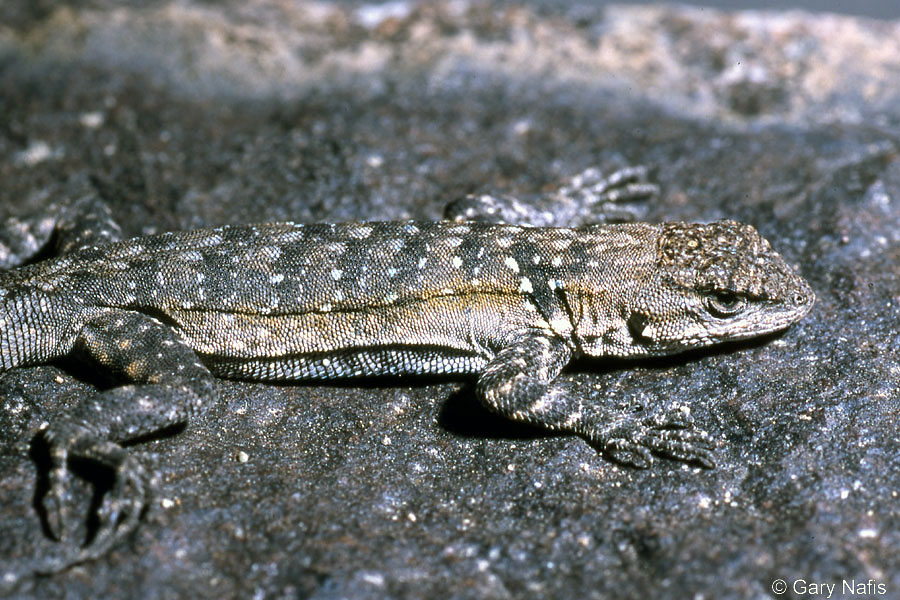
- Adult male

Conservation status
- Least Concern (IUCN 3.1)

Scientific classification
- Domain: Eukaryota
- Kingdom: Animalia
- Phylum: Chordata
- Class: Reptilia
- Order: Squamata
- Suborder: Iguania
- Family: Phrynosomatidae
- Genus: Urosaurus
- Species: U. lahtelai

Binomial name
- Urosaurus lahtelai Rau & Loomis, 1977

= Urosaurus lahtelai =

Species of lizard

Urosaurus lahtelai is a species of lizard. The common name for this species is the Baja California brush lizard. Its range is in Mexico.
