= Augustus S. Miller =

Mayor of Providence, Rhode Island, US

Augustus Samuel Miller
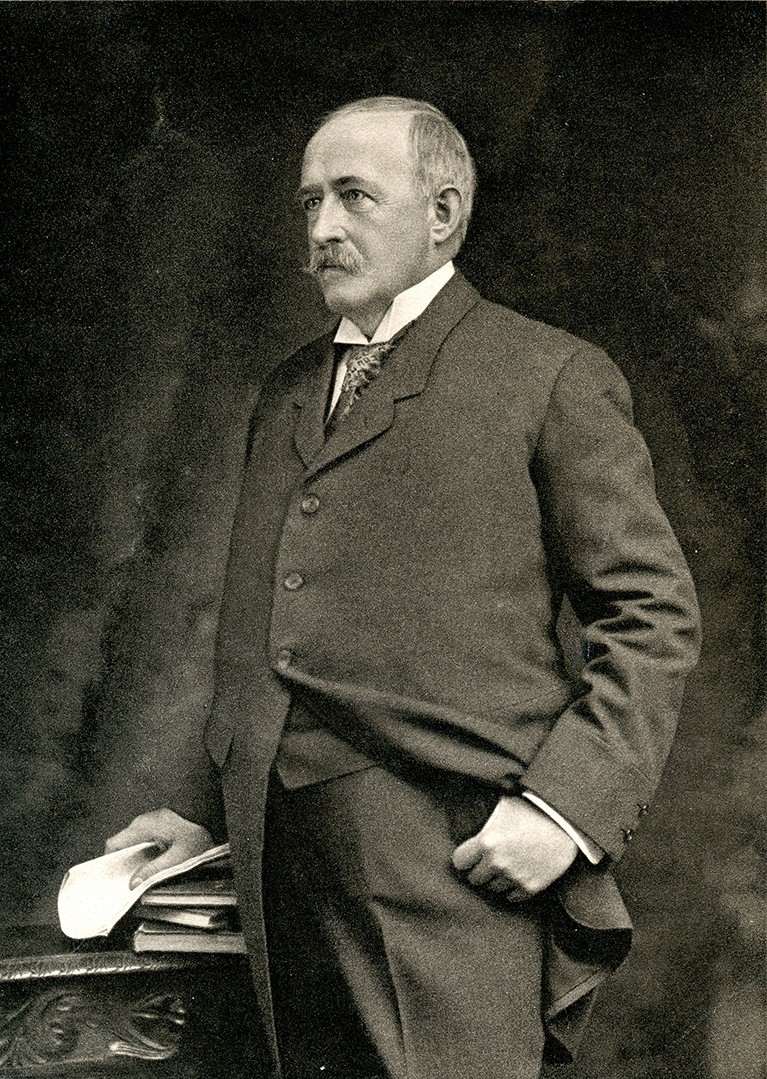

22nd Mayor of Providence, Rhode Island
- In office January 1903 – September 25, 1905
- Preceded by: Daniel L. D. Granger
- Succeeded by: Elisha Dyer Jr.

Personal details
- Born: August 13, 1847 Plainfield, Connecticut, U.S.
- Died: September 26, 1905 (aged 58) Providence, Rhode Island, U.S.
- Cause of death: Heart disease
- Resting place: North Burial Ground, Providence, RI
- Party: Democratic
- Spouse: Elizabeth LeMoine Davis
- Parent(s): Simon Williams Miller, Ann Lawton Miller
- Education: Brown University
- Occupation: Lawyer

Augustus Samuel Miller (August 13, 1847 – September 26, 1905) was 22nd mayor of Providence, Rhode Island 1903–1905. He died while in office.

== Personal life ==
Augustus S. Miller was born August 13, 1847, in Plainfield, Connecticut. His family ancestry can be traced back to Roger Williams. He graduated from Brown University in 1871.

== Law career ==
After being admitted to the bar in 1874, Miller formed a law partnership with Henry J. Spooner, who later was elected Congressman Later he formed the firm Miller & Caroll with Thomas A. Carroll. He was vice president of the Rhode Island Bar Association.

== Political career ==
Miller served several terms in the Rhode Island House of Representatives, and was speaker for two terms, 1889–1891. He also served two terms as state senator from Providence. Miller was elected to the mayor's office twice, in 1903 and 1904.

== Death and burial ==
Miller died suddenly while socializing at the elite Hope Club in Providence in the early morning hours of September 26. He sank back in his chair and died before help could arrive. The cause was ruled as heart disease. His wife Elizabeth and son William D. survived him.

He is buried in Providence's North Burial Ground.

Political offices
Preceded by Daniel L. D. Granger	Mayor of Providence; 1903–1905	Succeeded by Elisha Dyer Jr.
