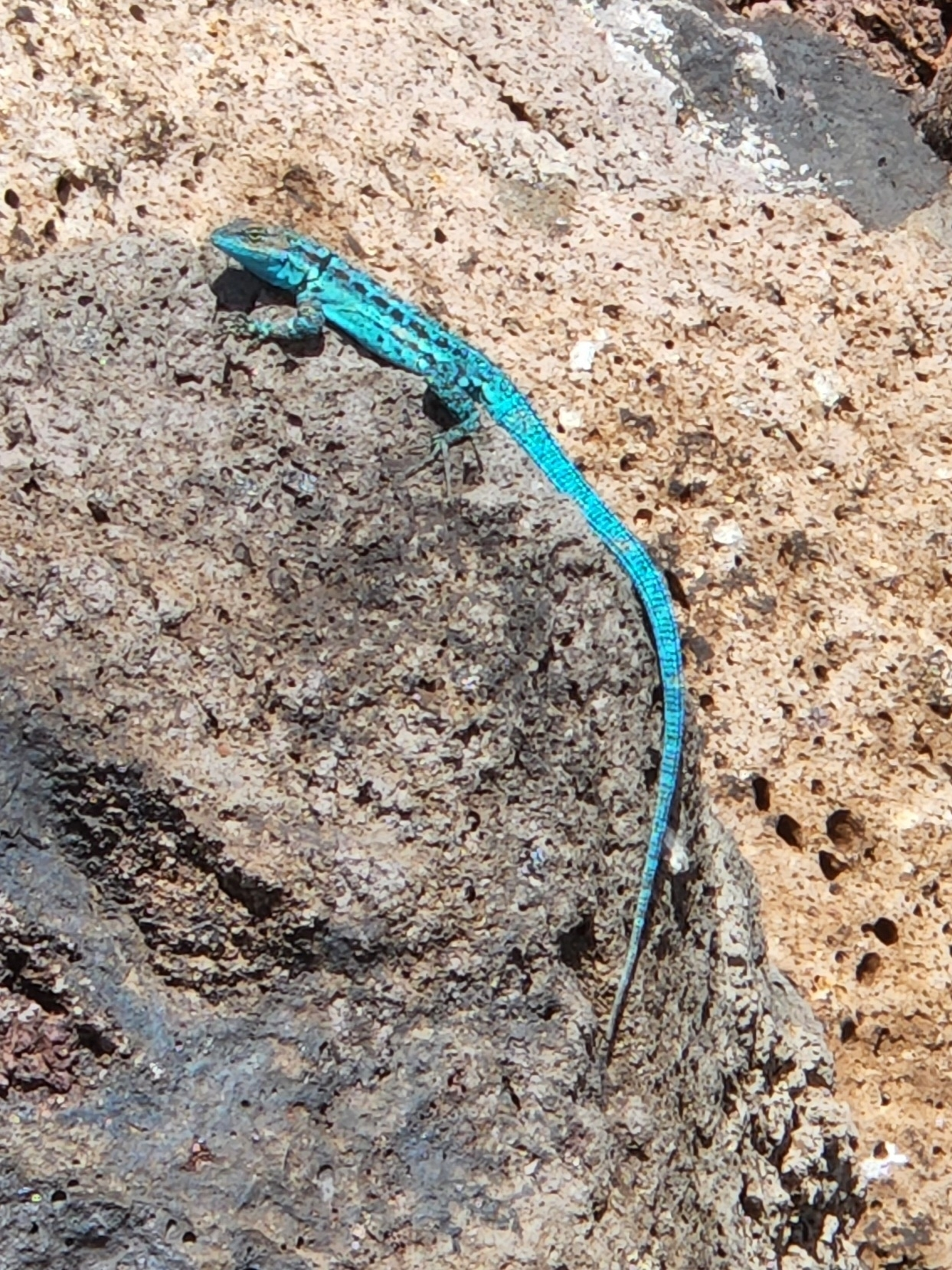

Conservation status
- Vulnerable (IUCN 3.1)

Scientific classification
- Domain: Eukaryota
- Kingdom: Animalia
- Phylum: Chordata
- Class: Reptilia
- Order: Squamata
- Suborder: Iguania
- Family: Phrynosomatidae
- Genus: Urosaurus
- Species: U. clarionensis

Binomial name
- Urosaurus clarionensis (Townsend, 1890)

= Urosaurus clarionensis =

Species of lizard

Urosaurus clarionensis is a species of lizard. The common name for this species is the Clarion Island tree lizard. Its range includes Clarion Island in Baja California.
