= Joshua M. Addeman =

19th century Rhode Island politician

Joshua Melancthon Addeman
- Born: November 5, 1840
- Died: October 13, 1930 (aged 89)
- Military career
- Other work: Lawyer; Secretary of State of Rhode Island

Joshua Melancthon Addeman (1840–1930) served as Secretary of State of Rhode Island from 1872 to 1887.

== Early life and education ==
Joshua M. Addeman was born in Bay of Islands, New Zealand on November 15, 1840. He was the son of Thomas Addeman and Maria (Fligg) Addeman. He was educated in the Providence public schools and graduated from Brown in 1862.

== Career ==
Shortly after his graduation, Addeman enlisted as a private in the 10th Rhode Island Infantry which served for three months in the defenses of Washington, D.C.

Later in the Civil War, Addeman was commissioned as the captain of Company H of the 2nd Battalion of the 14th Rhode Island Heavy Artillery (Colored). He served with that unit from 1863 to 1865. In January 1864, he went with his battalion to Louisiana where the battalion garrisoned a fort at Plaquemine, Louisiana guarding the northern approaches to New Orleans. After Lee's surrender in April 1865, the battalion was moved to Donaldsonville, where Addeman was appointed a provost marshal with power to enforce all laws made by the occupying Union Army. He returned to Rhode Island with his unit in October 1865.

After the war, he became a lawyer and resided in Providence. In 1872, he married Louise Waterman Winsor (died 1936).

He served as Secretary of State of Rhode Island from May 1872 until May 1887. He was one of the longest-serving secretaries of state in the history of Rhode Island.

In 1880, he published his war memoir Reminiscences of Two Years with the Colored Troops.

In addition to his political interests, Addeman was treasurer of the Industrial Trust Company, and later its vice-president. He was Clerk of the Common Council of Providence, treasurer and then vice-president of the Rhode Island Electric Protective Company, President of the Franklin Lyceum, President of the Soldiers and Sailors Historical Society of Rhode Island, vice-president of the Home for Aged Men in Providence and President of the Tenth Rhode Island Veterans Association.

He was a member of the Grand Army of the Republic and the Freemasons. Sometime between 1881 and 1893, he was elected as an honorary member of the New York Society of the Cincinnati. He later transferred his membership to the Rhode Island Society of the Cincinnati.

== Death and legacy ==
Addeman died in Providence on October 13, 1930, at the age of 89 years. He is buried in the Swan Point Cemetery in Providence.

Political offices
Preceded by John Russell Bartlett	Secretary of State of Rhode Island; 1872–1887	Succeeded by Edwin D. McGuinness
