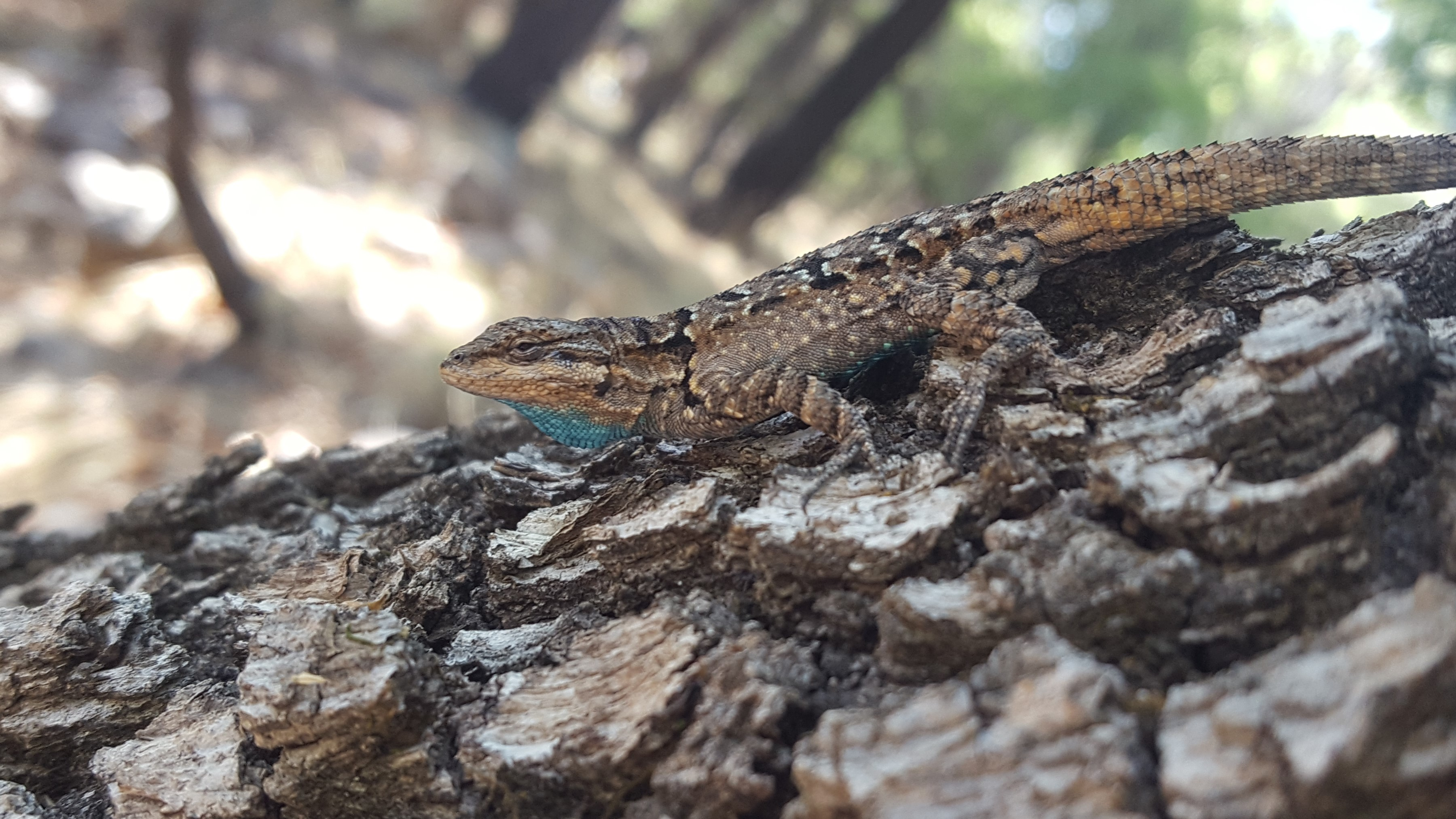

Conservation status
- Least Concern (IUCN 3.1)

- Secure (NatureServe)

Scientific classification
- Kingdom: Animalia
- Phylum: Chordata
- Class: Reptilia
- Order: Squamata
- Suborder: Iguania
- Family: Phrynosomatidae
- Genus: Urosaurus
- Species: U. ornatus

Binomial name
- Urosaurus ornatus (Baird & Girard, 1852)

Synonyms
- Uta ornata Baird & Girard, 1852; Urosaurus ornatus — Mittleman, 1942

= Urosaurus ornatus =

Species of lizard

Urosaurus ornatus, commonly known as the ornate tree lizard, is a species of lizard in the family Phrynosomatidae. The species is native to the southwestern United States and northwestern Mexico. The species, which was formerly called simply the "tree lizard", has been used to study physiological changes during the fight-or-flight response as related to stress and aggressive competition. Its life history and costs of reproduction have been documented in field populations in New Mexico and Arizona. This species has been fairly well studied because of its interesting variation in throat color in males (within a population) that can correlate with different reproductive strategies.

== Appearance ==
The ornate tree lizard may grow to a snout-to-vent length (SVL) of up to 59 millimetres (2.3 in). As adults, all males have paired turquoise patches of skin on the abdomen; females lack this abdominal coloration. Male ornate tree lizards are found in a variety of colors. While not all populations contain more than one or two colors, 9 color types have been documented within U. ornatus. A population documented in Verde River, Arizona, has two types of coloration patterns among male tree lizards that account for 45% of all males. The first is characterized by a blue spot in the center of a larger orange patch on the throat fan ("dewlap"). The second has a solid orange throat fan ("dewlap"). The orange-blue males are more aggressive and defend territories that can include up to four females. The orange males have longer, leaner body types and are much less aggressive. Orange males can be nomadic during dry years, and during rainy years tend to occupy small territories.

=== Hierarchies ===
The differences in throat color can impact many different behaviors and create hierarchies within these lizard populations. It is thought that the blue patch on their throats acts as a badge that signals fighting ability and social status across age or sex classes. In most interactions, males with an orange background and a blue spot (OB) tend to dominate those with only an orange background (O). When two OB males encounter one another, the individual with the larger blue spot is typically more dominant, indicating a direct relationship between spot size and social status. Throat coloration also influences reproductive behavior. Males displaying a solid greenish-blue patch within an orange background (OB) are generally more territorial and aggressive than males lacking this feature (O), suggesting that OB males are more likely to compete actively for mates. These two types of males, therefore, are thought to express alternative reproductive strategies due to their differences in territoriality. The blue patch can be described as a characteristic that heavily contributes to sexual selection since females tend to mate with males that have larger blue spots.

=== Multiple male genders ===
Some, such as Stanford professor and biologist Joan Roughgarden, have suggested multiple male genders in this species. Among differently colored male tree lizards, there are different hormonal profiles. On the day a male tree lizard hatches, researchers think that high blood levels of progesterone and then later, as a juvenile, higher testosterone levels will cause him to develop into an orange-blue type; low progesterone and later lower testosterone levels, as a juvenile, may lead the male to develop into an orange type. During dry weather conditions, orange-type males' corticosterone levels increase, which causes testosterone to decrease, leading them to be more likely to leave their territory and become nomadic. Orange-blue males do not have this hormonal response to the weather, and remain in their territories regardless of climatic conditions.

=== Speed and stamina ===
The differences in throat color can also be related to speed and stamina in male lizards. OB males or dominant males are significantly faster than O males and have higher lengths of stamina than O males. The link between social hierarchy and locomotor performance can be traced to the suite of displays that identify a dominant individual being the presence/size of the blue spot on their throats. These activities may be affected by different intensities and duration and it is possible for an O male to have better speed and stamina than an OB male, it is just uncommon. The OB male having territorial and defensive traits makes them spend more time fighting or displaying and asserting their dominance over the O lizards and exerting that amount of physical strength allows them to develop the higher rates of speed and longer durations of stamina. When the O male competes against the OB male and loses, the O male does not get the opportunity to utilize their speed and stamina and therefore causes them to have decreased rates of speed and shorter periods of stamina.

=== Significance of throat color ===
The throat color of this lizard represents important information about their level of development. Juvenile males will firstly have an orange throat color. Monomorphic males will maintain this orange throat coloration for life, however, polymorphic males will either retain their orange throat color or they will develop a yellow throat color as they mature. The ontogenic color change of the throats for polymorphic males have important social functions. Females and young males with an orange throat coloration inhibits aggression from male adults. Dominant males that develop different throat colors late in their development will typically have blue and blue-green throats. This suggests that these colors are visual indicators of social dominance. Researchers have hypothesized that the different throat colors of these lizards have important social functions. This is because the throat coloration of male ornate tree lizards affects their social relationships. Additionally, since throat coloration is a genetically determined trait, it is possible that the different throat colors seen in polymorphic males during developmental stages are responses to changing social roles, enabled by phenotypic plasticity, as the lizards mature.

Additionally, throat coloration is also associated with size. 82% of hatchlings develop an orange throat color within 15 days of hatching and the lizards that had a delayed onset of throat coloration are typically smaller for their age. Therefore, the size of the ornate tree lizard is a better indicator of their throat color than their age.

== Population structure ==
Urosaurus ornatus has a complicated social hierarchy causing O males and OB males to fight for resources. The social systems that allow for the stability of the lizard population cause a mixed evolutionary stable strategy for the continuation of their genes. In a mixed evolutionarily stable strategy, both morphs pursue different life history strategies that allow them to achieve equal fitness. O and OB males behave differently in different situations, but most times having the OB male be dominant over the O male. While OB males are more dominant socially, O males are usually larger and grow faster than OB males, both in captivity and in the wild. O males will reach a larger size before breeding time, but once both O and OB males reach adulthood they are the same size.

=== Effects of habitat ===
Lizards are ectotherms and because of their temperature dependent lifestyle they may not follow predictions of density‐dependent habitat selection models because temperature strongly influences their habitat selection and population structure. Since competition for resources can cause a decrease in fitness, increased population size should cause a decrease in body size and growth rates across the population. In these lizards there is population density-dependent growth for females of this species but not for males. The temperature quality of the environment that these lizards live in also determines body size and composition. Lizards that are raised and produced in crowded spaces and environments with poor resources and lower temperatures grow smaller than lizards in higher quality environments with better suited temperatures and good resources.

It has been suggested that the abundance of rainfall that the ornate tree lizard experiences induce a multitude of changes in this lizard's behaviors. During a four-year study in the grapevine hills of Big Bend National Park in Texas, researchers observed the behavior of this lizard from 1974 to 1978. During 1974 and 1976, precipitation was abundant, however, during 1975 and 1977, there was little precipitation. During the dry years, there is a decrease in available prey and the ornate tree lizard's individual foraging success, growth rates, body masses, and prehibernation lipid levels were significantly lower. Population density was also reduced. These results have led researchers to propose that dry years are stressors which induces changes in diet, behaviors, and health of individuals. Since drought induces food scarcity, there is increased intra-specific competition for resources. Studies have demonstrated that Sceloporus merriami and the U. ornatus lizards also compete interspecifically for resources. Limited resources lowers population density of both lizard species. There is seasonal variation in the intensity of competition between these species which is highly correlated to food availability and the amount of rainfall. Where rainfall varies, the intensity of interspecific competition also varies. Therefore, the state of the environment directly affects competition and food availability for the ornate tree lizard.

== Geographic range ==
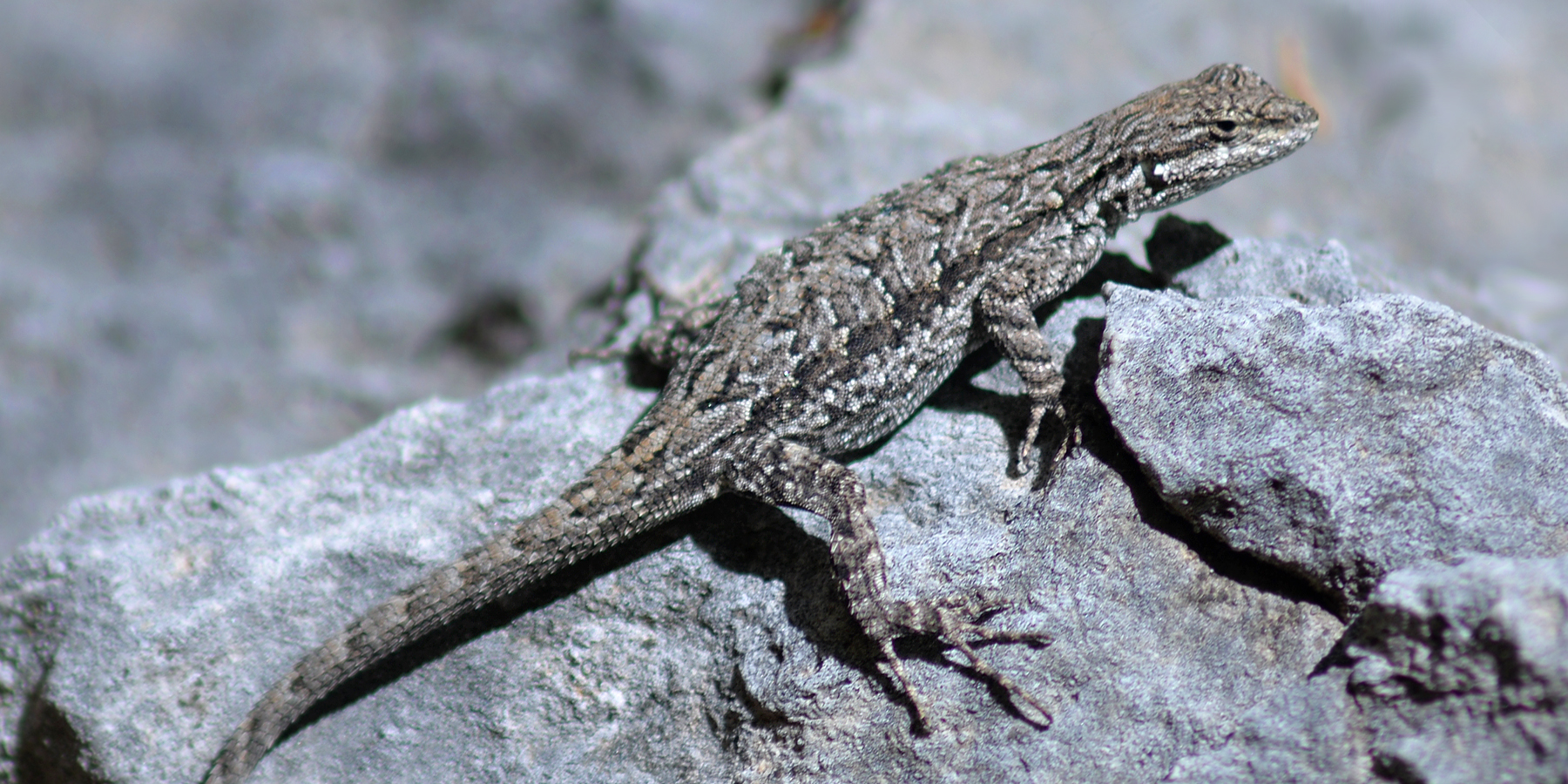
Big Bend tree lizard (Urosaurus ornatus schmidti), in situ, Culberson County, Texas (14 May 2018)

Urosaurus ornatus is one of the most widespread and abundant of North American lizards. It inhabits a wide range of states throughout the United States, including California, Nevada, Utah, Colorado, Wyoming, Arizona, New Mexico, and Texas. It is arboreal, semi arboreal, or saxicolous throughout its wide living range and habitats. It can also be found in areas in Mexico including states such as Sonora, Sinaloa, Chihuahua, and Coahuila.

There are large temperature ranges throughout the southwestern United States and these lizards adapt to the different climates that they live in. Their mean body temperatures also change depending on where they are located. If the male lizard was in a montane habitat or a desert habitat their body temperature would be 35 degrees Celsius, but if the male lizard was in a desert riparian habitat its body temperature would be around 38 degrees Celsius. Their changes in body temperatures reflect the climates they live in. These temperature differences also occur between male and female lizards. On average the body temperature of a female is lower than the males body temperature. There is a possibility that this difference in body temperature could be related to the presence or absence of sexual differences between males and females and could also affect the health of the clutch and the size of the clutch.

== Size ==
The size of each lizard is closely related to their age and the seasonal state of their environment. During winter months (January through March), 75% of adults and 25% of juveniles are active and 13% of juveniles are active in the spring season. Additionally, at the beginning of April, 87% of the ornate tree lizards are in a reproductive state. This is because the beginning of April marks the beginning of their breeding season. By the month of May, however, all the lizards have reproductive potential.

=== Growth ===
The lizards will reach their minimum adult size within a year. Male ornate tree lizards will grow approximately 0.16 to 0.29 mm per month. During the spring and summer seasons, however, the male growth rate increases to an average of 2.1 mm per month. Female ornate tree lizards are typically smaller than males when they reach adulthood. When the females grow to 45 mm, they are considered 'mature'. For males, there is a small range in their size. Researchers have proposed that there is a stabilization in growth rate as they approach their maximum size.

== Locomotion ==
These lizards tend to be active during every month except December. Both male and female ornate tree lizards emerge only on the warmest days in November and January, however, they engage in extended period of activity in February. When the lizards are active, they tend to occupy open locations in small or large boulders.

== Anti-predator behavior ==
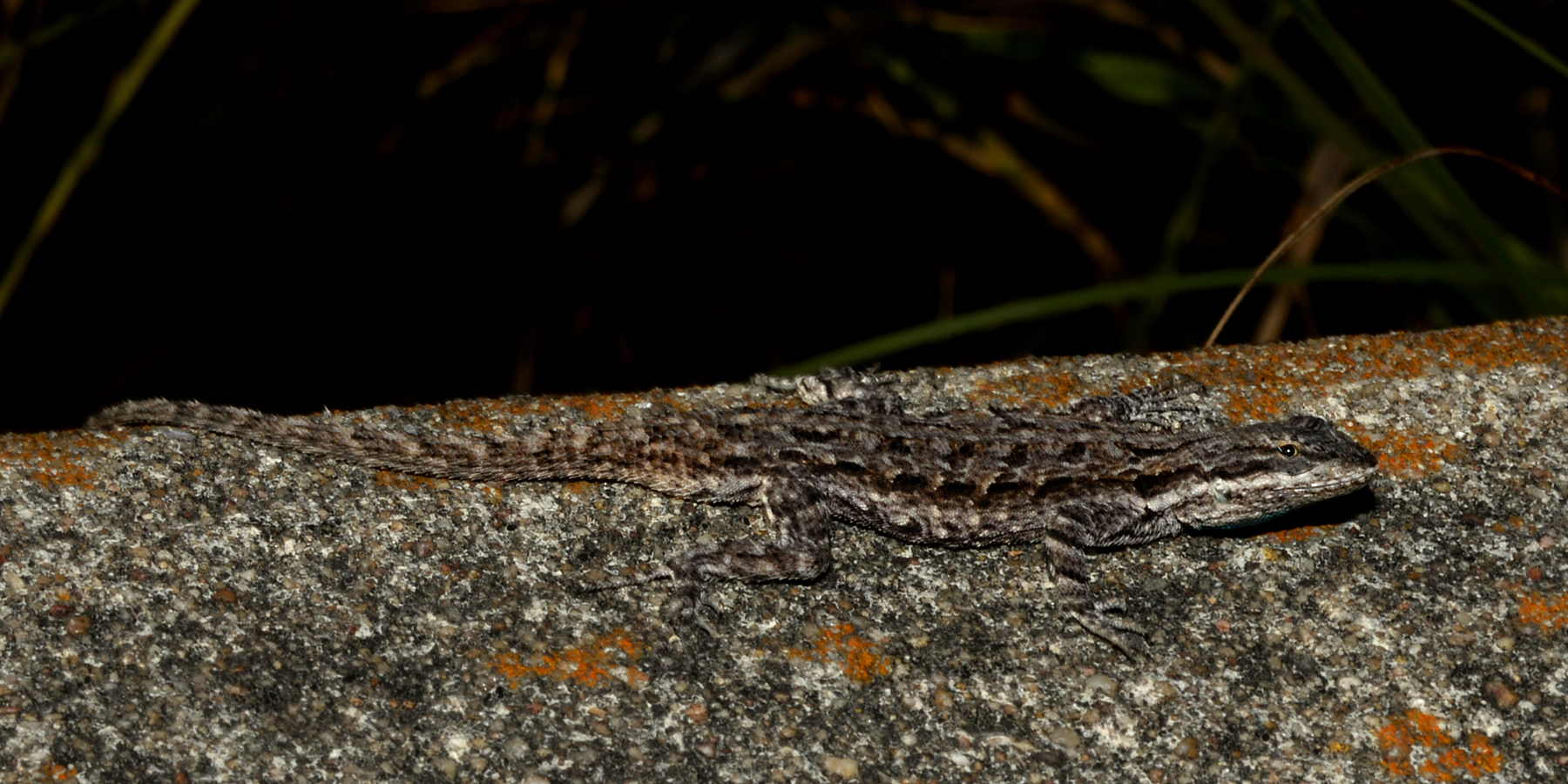
Texas tree lizard (Urosaurus ornatus ornatus), in situ, Kerr County, Texas (18 April 2015)

Male Usosaurus ornatus lizards express chemical and behavioral responses to predators. Chemical responses of the males when encountering a predator can include changes in their levels of testosterone and corticosterone while behavioral responses shown tend to be hiding and flight initiation distance (FID, the distance between the animal and the predator before escape is attempted). Levels of expression in both chemical and behavioral responses can differ depending on color variation of the throat. Chemical levels in both O and OB males can change significantly when predators are spotted. When encountered with a predator, the lizard's corticosterone levels in both O and OB males spike, but both types of males have the same hormone levels. When looking at testosterone levels in both O and OB males when encountering a predator, both males testosterone levels spiked, but the O males had higher testosterone levels than the OB males. When looking at behavioral responses there is also a difference in hiding time and flight distance. When encountering a predator O males have a larger flight distance compared to OB males, meaning that O males will escape when a predator is farther away when compared to an OB male, which will let the predator get closer before escaping. Hiding time differed between O males and OB males, where O males had significantly longer hiding periods after the encounter with the predator when compared to OB males. Overall OB males express lower chemical levels, shorter flight distances, and shorter hiding periods when encountered with a predator compared to O males.

The differences in anti-predator behavior can be attributed to the binding capacity of plasma binding globulins. Binding globulins regulate steroid hormone impacts on behavior and physiology in the body can cause differences in hormone levels which can affect changes in behavior. When bound to a corticosteroid-binding globulin (CBG), plasma corticosterone may not diffuse into target cells, and thus, sensitivity of individuals to circulating corticosterone can depend on binding capacity and level of CBG. The binding affinity of the androgen-glucocorticoid-binding globulin (AGBG) in tree lizards is similar between the territorial OB and nonterritorial O males, but AGBG has a greater binding capacity in OB males. Nonterritorial O males have higher levels of free corticosterone than do territorial OB males during stressful events due to the differences in binding capacity and levels of CBG. This free corticosterone difference could contribute to the higher behavioral reactivity - greater flight initiation distances and longer hiding duration - of O males compared to OB males in response to predation risk.

== Diet ==
The ornate tree lizard feeds on mostly insects and their larvae, but have also been known to eat plants and vegetables as well as inanimate objects thinking they were food. These lizards also have diet patterns that change throughout the seasons changing what they eat and the quantity of it. In the winter/spring time their main food sources and largest quantity of food eaten were from the insect families Homoptera, Formicidae, Hemiptera, and Lepidopterous larvae but in the summer their diet changed to their main food sources mostly consisting of the insect families Coleoptera and Formicidae. For the ornate tree lizard, their food intake is variable. Multiple studies have provided evidence that the diet of the Urosaurus ornatus is seasonally variable—the diet changes according to changes in the seasons. Because they are abundant in areas where there are more trees, they depend on the food available in that niche. When the seasons undergo change or the prey migrate, it induces changes in the abundance of the lizards food and its availability.

== Reproduction ==
A group of U. ornatus, consisting of one male and one or more females, typically inhabits an area containing one or more large trees, shrubs, or boulders. The male copulates with each female, and the females retain eggs about two weeks after mating. In many parts of its range, females may lay more than one clutch of eggs a year.

=== Female reproduction ===
There is a direct correlation between the size of the female lizard and the size of the clutch that is produced. As body size increases the clutch size increases as well, making the bigger female lizards have a higher fitness due to size rarity. Body size for the female lizard could be a sought after trait and could be a factor in sexual selection and choosing a mate, a male may go after a larger female knowing that they will produce a larger number of offspring which will help them carry on their genes. There is also a relationship between the environment that the clutch is hatched in and the size of the clutch. Females that lay eggs in wet years tend to have a higher clutch size than females that lay eggs in the dryer years. This is due to temperature dependent reproduction and the effects the environment has on the reproductive process. The optimized temperature for the clutch to reach its maximum size comes with the temperatures associated with the dry season when reproducing.

Reproducing female ornate tree lizards are generally pregnant between late March through August. Additionally, they produce around two to seven eggs in their clutch once a year. The mean clutch size, however, is variable. The size of a female's clutch varies according to the season, and it will vary according to the geographical location of the female lizard. The latitude the reproducing female inhabits will change in the reproductive outcomes of the females. All the female's hatchlings will reach sexual maturity within one year of hatching. The hatchlings produced by the female appear from the middle of June through to November. During the autumn season, however, hatching is highest. Females will have enlarged ovarian follicles from the beginning of March through August. Additionally, the frequency of pregnant females is the highest during the months of April, July, and August.

=== Male reproduction ===
During the months of June through to November, male ornate tree lizards have enlarged testes when they reach sexual maturity. When the males emerge in January, they will have small testes, however, their mean testis size becomes progressively larger between the months of February, March, and April. By April, their testis size will level off and by June, the males will generally reach their largest testes size. By July, their testes size will slightly decrease and by August and September, their testes will rapidly decrease.

=== Resource allocation for reproduction ===
When resources become scarce for the ornate tree lizard, this species encounters a multitude of critical challenges. There is direct competition between the female lizard's reproductive system and immune system for resources. When the amount of food intake is manipulated for reproducing female ornate tree lizards, there are changes in their allocation of resources in their bodies. When females have unlimited access to food intake, their reproductive systems and immune systems were readily maintained and healthy. This is because these females can invest more of their energy into reproduction and towards their immune systems. Therefore, these females can reproduce while simultaneously healing any wounds that they have on their bodies. When the females are on a restrictive diet, they experience changes in their reproductive and immune functions. If these reproducing females must invest energy into their reproductive and immune systems, there is a tradeoff. Therefore, these females have smaller follicles than the non-wounded females. When the females, however, are denied access to any food (extreme food restriction), they do not invest any energy towards their reproductive or immune systems. Therefore, these females are influenced by resource competition between their reproductive and immune systems. This competition, however, only manifests itself when there are limited resources, and the intensity of this tradeoff depends on the abundance of resources. Since the abundance of resources is malleable because of the constantly changing environment, the intensity of the tradeoff is also malleable.

=== Territoriality ===
Territoriality is an important part of reproduction for many males in this species. Males often defend territories by aggressively excluding other males. This aggression can, in part, be enhanced with higher levels of the steroid hormones testosterone and progesterone. Females have home ranges but they do not defend territories. When the number of females on a male's territory is experimentally reduced by removing the females, the male is more likely to abandon his territory.

=== Phenotype and reproduction ===
Females also can vary in throat coloration, although this is not as well-studied. When gravid with eggs, females tend to be orange or red. Recent experiments also suggest females have association, and perhaps mating preferences for different male types, and that this female preference varies with the throat color of the female herself, and with the colors of the two males that she was presented.

== Subspecies ==
Ten subspecies are recognized as being valid, including the nominotypical subspecies.

- U. o. ornatus (Baird & Girard, 1852) – Texas tree lizard
- U. o. caeruleus (H.M. Smith, 1935)
- U. o. chiricahuae (Mittleman, 1941)
- U. o. lateralis (Boulenger, 1883)
- U. o. levis (Stejneger, 1890) – smooth tree lizard
- U. o. linearis (Baird, 1859) – lined tree lizard
- U. o. schmidti (Mittleman, 1940) – Big Bend tree lizard
- U. o. schottii (Baird, 1858) – Schott's tree lizard
- U. o. symmetricus (Baird, 1858) – Colorado River tree lizard
- U. o. wrighti (Schmidt, 1921) – northern tree lizard

Nota bene: A trinomial authority in parentheses indicates that the subspecies was originally described in a genus other than Urosaurus.

== Etymologies ==
The subspecific name, schmidti, is in honor of American herpetologist Karl P. Schmidt.

The subspecific name, schottii, is in honor of German-American naturalist Arthur Carl Victor Schott.

The subspecific name, wrighti, is in honor of American herpetologist Albert Hazen Wright.
