= John Russell Bartlett =

American historian and linguist (1805–1886)

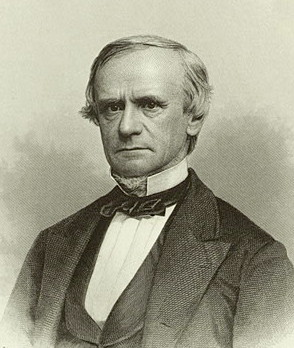
- Born: October 23, 1805; Providence, Rhode Island, US
- Died: 28 May 1886 (aged 80); Providence, Rhode Island, US
- Scientific career
- Fields: History, linguistics

Signature
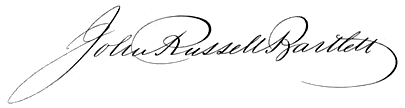

John Russell Bartlett (October 23, 1805 – May 28, 1886) was an American historian and linguist.

== Early life ==
Bartlett was born in Providence, Rhode Island, on October 23, 1805, the son of Smith Bartlett and Nancy (Russell) Bartlett. In 1819 he was a student at the Lowville Academy in Lowville, New York, which he attended for two years. From 1807 to 1824 he lived in Kingston, Canada. From 1824 to 1836 he lived in Providence where he worked first as a clerk in his uncle's dry goods store (1824–1828), then as a bookkeeper and acting teller at the Bank of North America (1828–1831), and finally as the first cashier of the Globe Bank (1831–1836).

== Intellectual life, business ==
In 1831, he was one of the founders of the Providence Athenaeum, and was elected its first treasurer. That year he was also elected to membership in the Rhode Island Historical Society. The following year he was ordering books for the newly founded Providence Franklin Society, an early lyceum. Over the course of his life he became involved with a number of other organizations including the New England Historic Genealogical Society, and being elected a member of the American Antiquarian Society in 1856.

Bartlett moved to New York City in 1836, where he became a partner in the dry goods commission house of Jesup, Swift and Company. In 1840 he and his friend Charles Welford started the bookselling and publishing firm of Bartlett and Welford which was located in the Astor House hotel on the west side of Broadway between Vesey and Barclay streets. The firm, which was known for its large stock of foreign books, issued five catalogs between 1840 and 1848. While in New York, he became friends with a number of leading intellectuals, including the ethnologist and public servant Albert Gallatin. In 1842, he helped Gallatin found the American Ethnological Society. Bartlett later served as the Foreign Corresponding Secretary of the organization.

Bartlett is known in the field of lexicography for his Dictionary of Americanisms (1848), a pioneering work that, although supplanted by later dialect studies, is still of value to students of language and remains a valuable contribution to the subject. Later editions were published in 1859, 1860, and 1877. The first edition was translated into Dutch and published in 1854. The third edition of 1860 was translated into German and published in 1866.

== United States Boundary Commissioner, travels through the American Southwest ==
Bartlett returned to Providence in 1850. He then traveled to Washington D.C., intending to request the position of ambassador to Denmark. Instead he was offered the position of United States Boundary Commissioner responsible for surveying the boundary between the United States and Mexico. This required him to form a group to travel throughout the Southwest. Members of the Whig Party deluged Bartlett with applications for positions on the survey for young men recommended by talents such as "a true gentleman", "skilled in French", "Having a talent for words", "a citizen of Providence", etc. Bartlett was criticized for accepting many men who had no relevant skills to offer the survey and did not flourish while traveling and camping in the West. He did resist some inappropriate requests, daring to reject the recommendation of one Thomas W. Jones by Henry Clay and nine other US Senators, pointing out that Jones was "a hanger-on in Washington and all wanted him out of the way".

Some group members were more useful; in addition to the professional surveyors, there were four botanists and four zoologists who made significant contributions. Some were at least decorative; the painter Henry Cheever Pratt contributed thirty plates to Bartlett's A Personal Narrative of Explorations and Incidents in Texas, New Mexico, California, Sonora and Chihuahua (2 vols, 1854), published after Bartlett was superseded by another commissioner. It contains much valuable scientific and historical material concerning the area. Bartlett collected word lists from many of the Native Americans who he met. The autoethnonym of the Seri people of northwestern Mexico, Comcaac (which he wrote as "komkak"), was first recorded by Bartlett during a short visit to the area in early 1852. The word was included in the list of approximately 180 words that Bartlett archived in the Bureau of American Ethnology (now part of the National Anthropological Archives, housed at the Smithsonian Institution).

He remained Boundary Commissioner from 1850 to 1853, when the Whig Party lost power upon the accession of President Franklin Pierce.

== Secretary of State for Rhode Island, librarian ==
From 1855 to 1872 Bartlett was Secretary of State of Rhode Island, and while serving in this capacity thoroughly re-arranged and classified the state records and prepared various bibliographies and compilations, relating chiefly to the history of the state. In the later years of his life he became the librarian for the John Carter Brown Library and collated an exhaustive catalog of the collection that was published in four volumes. He died in Providence on May 28, 1886.

== Marriages and children ==
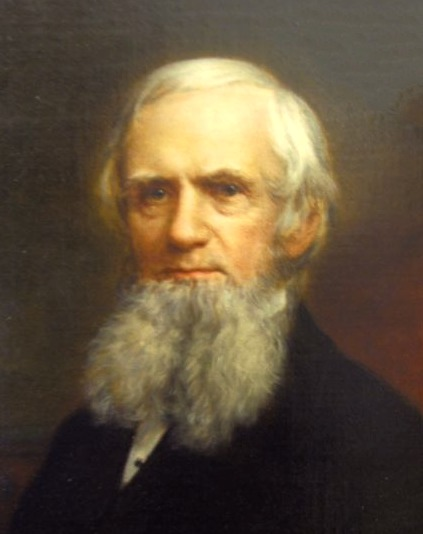
Portrait of Bartlett by John Sullivan Lincoln

Bartlett married Eliza Allen Rhodes of Pawtuxet, Rhode Island on May 15, 1831. They had seven children, including four daughters: Elizabeth Dorrance (1833–1840), Anna Russell (1835–1885), Leila (1846–1850), and Fanny Osgood (1850–1882). The last daughter was named for the poet Frances Sargent Osgood, a friend of the family. Their three sons were Marine Corps major Henry Anthony (1838–1901), George Francis (1840–1842), captain, and later rear admiral on the Retired List, John R. Bartlett, USN, who served in the Civil War and Spanish–American War and who was also a noted oceanographer. Eliza died in 1853. On November 12, 1863, Bartlett married his second wife, Ellen Eddy, of Providence.

== Selected works ==
- Bartlett, John Russell (1847). The Progress of Ethnology: An Account of Recent Archæological, Philological and Geographical Researches in Various Parts of the Globe, Tending to Elucidate the Physical History of Man (2nd ed.). New York: William Van Norden.
- Bartlett, John Russell (1854). Personal Narrative of Explorations and Incidents in Texas, New Mexico, California, Sonora, and Chihuahua: Connected with the United States and Mexican Boundary Commission, During the Years 1850, '51, '52, and '53 (Vol. I) and (Vol. II) New York: D. Appleton & Company.
- Bartlett, John Russell (1858). Census of the Inhabitants of the Colony of Rhode Island and Providence Plantations. Providence: Anthony Knowles & Company.
- Bartlett, John Russell (1865). Records of the Colony of Rhode Island and Providence Plantations, in New England: 1784–1792. Providence: Providence Press Co.
- Bartlett, John Russell (1866). The Literature of the Rebellion: A Catalogue of Books and Pamphlets Relating to the Civil War of the United States. Boston: Draper and Halliday.
- Bartlett, John Russell (1874). The Soldiers' National Cemetery at Gettysburg: With the Proceedings at Its Consecration, at the Laying of the Corner-stone of the Monument, and at Its Dedication. Providence: Providence Press Co.
- Bartlett, John Russell (1877). Dictionary of Americanisms: A Glossary of Words and Phrases Usually Regarded as Peculiar to the United States (4th ed.). Boston: Little, Brown, and Company.

== Gallery ==
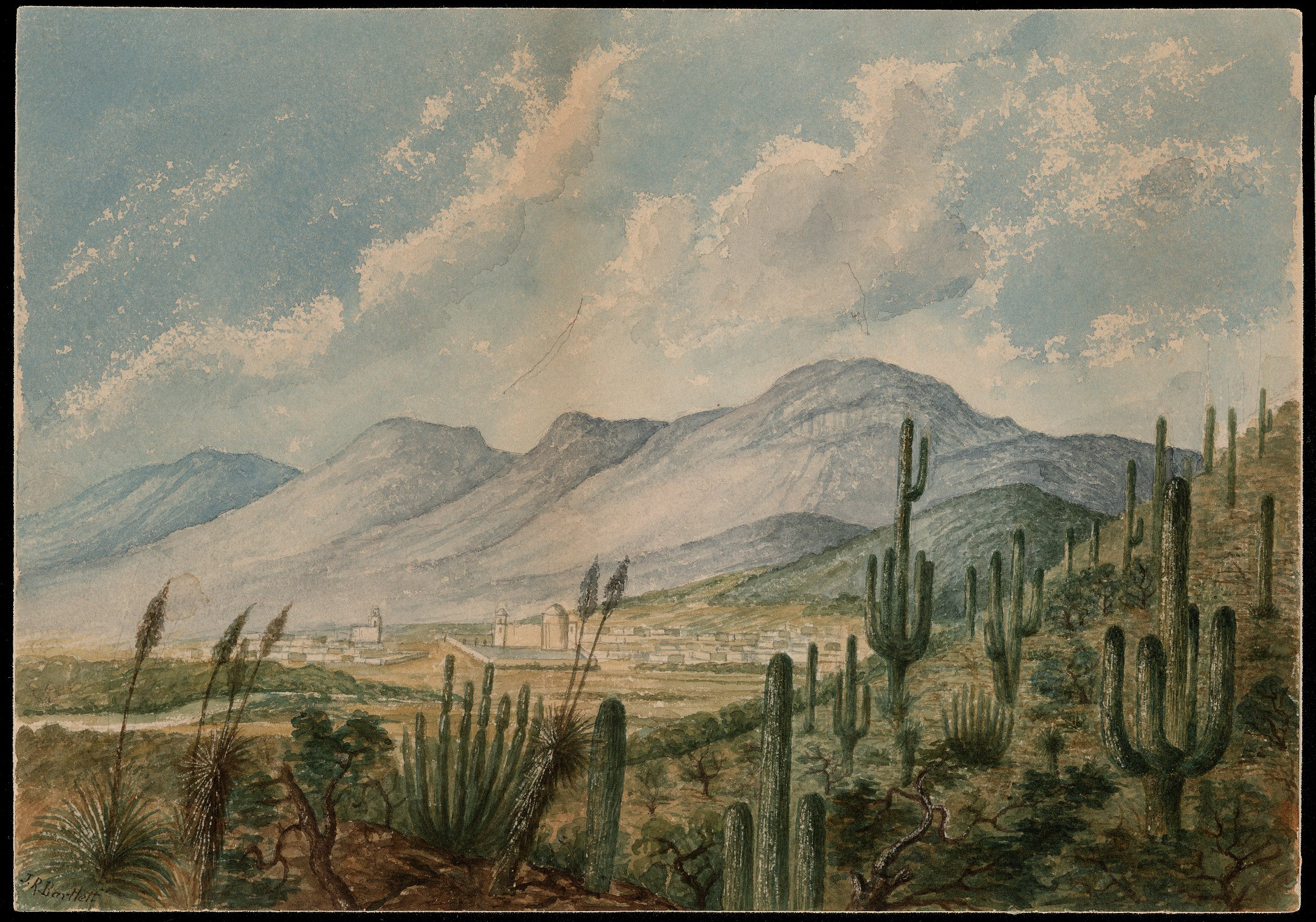

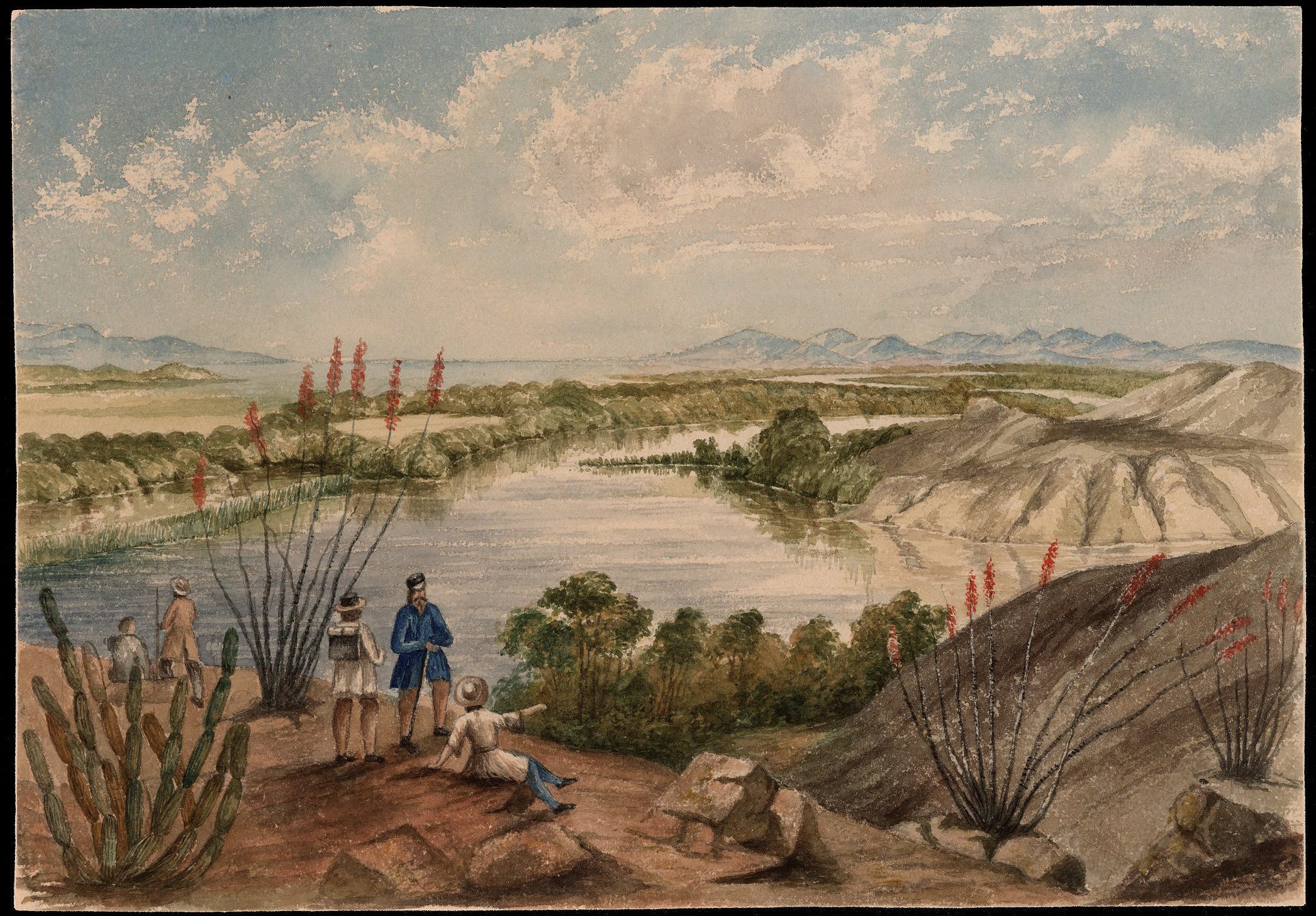

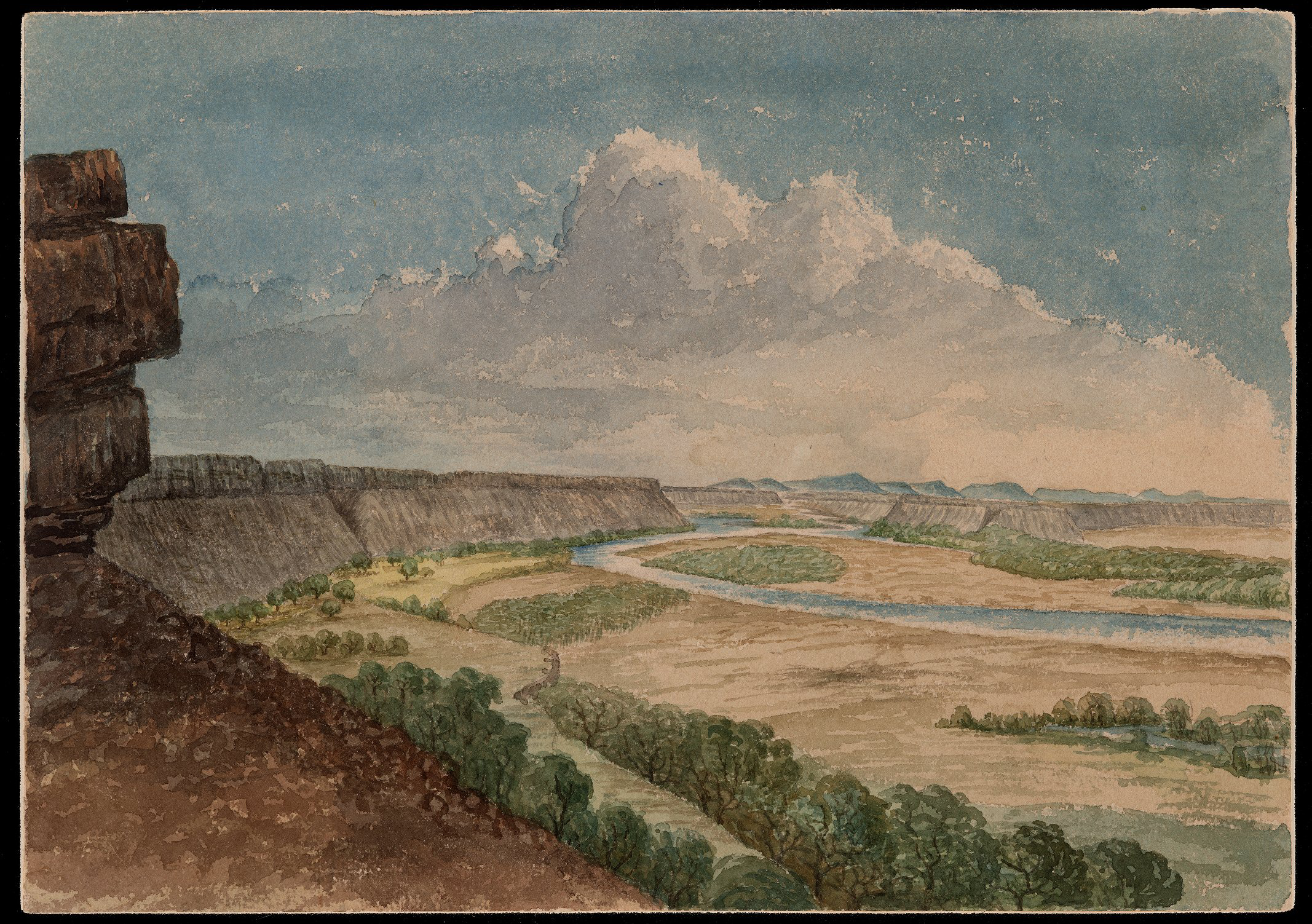

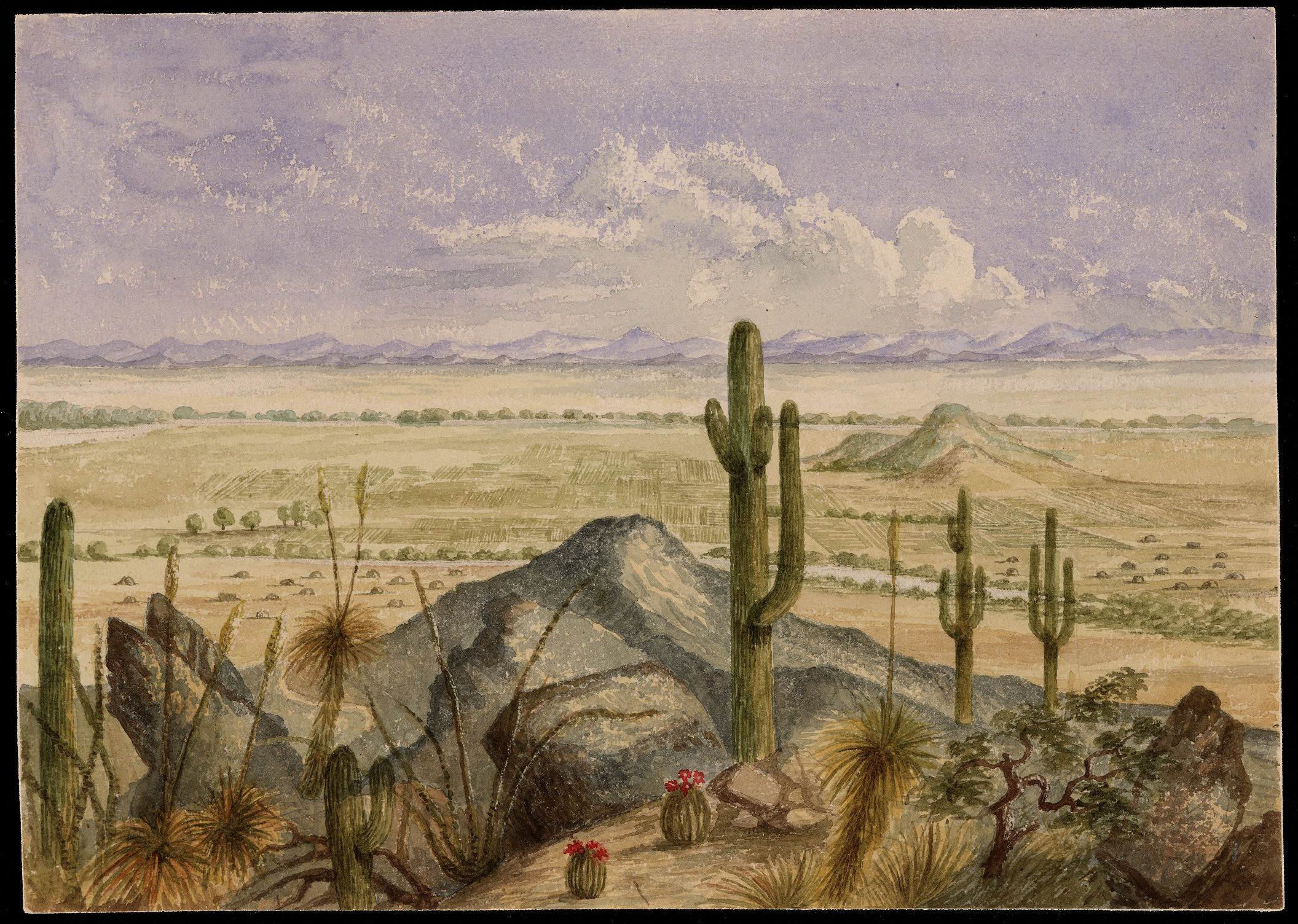

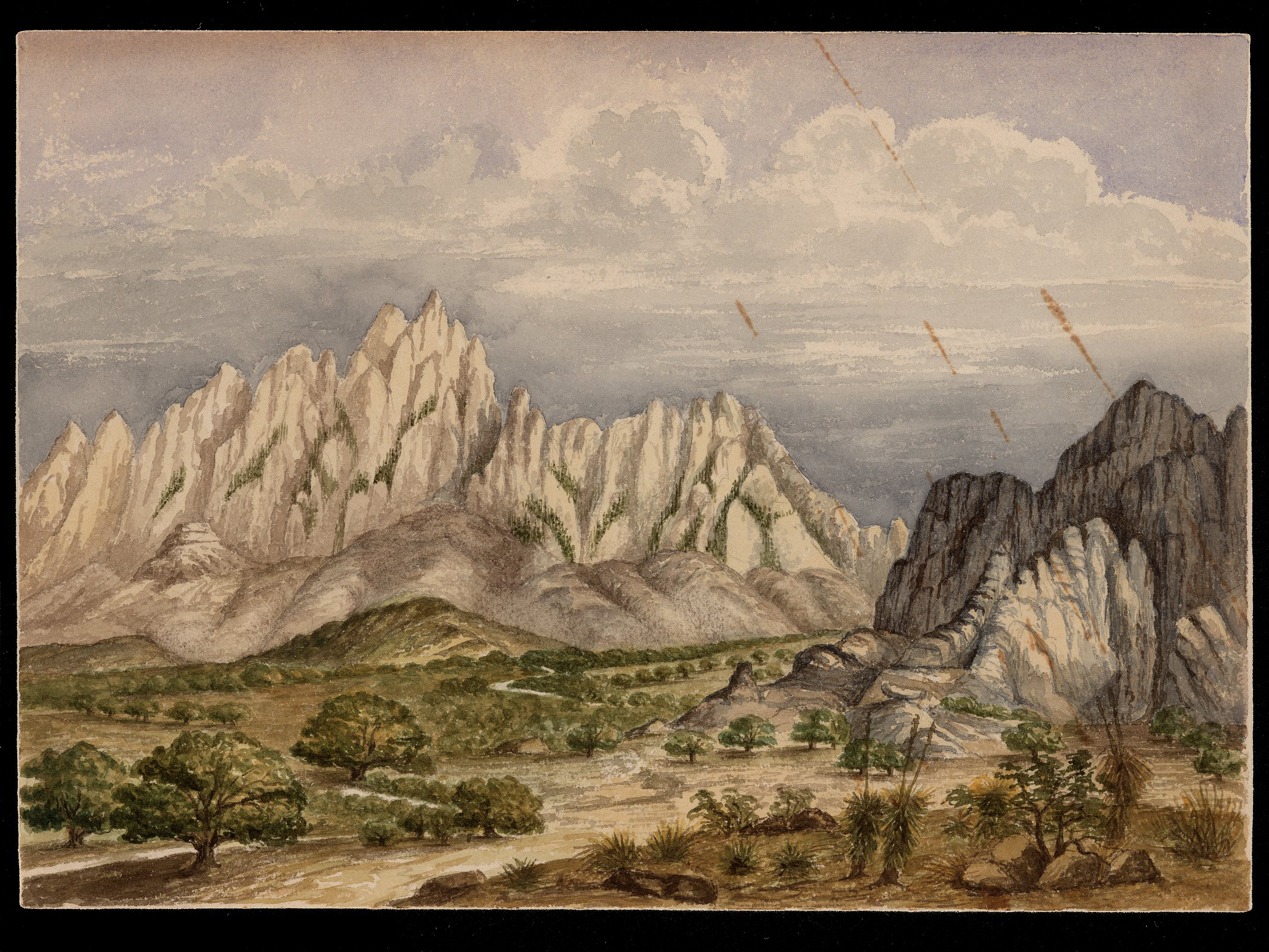

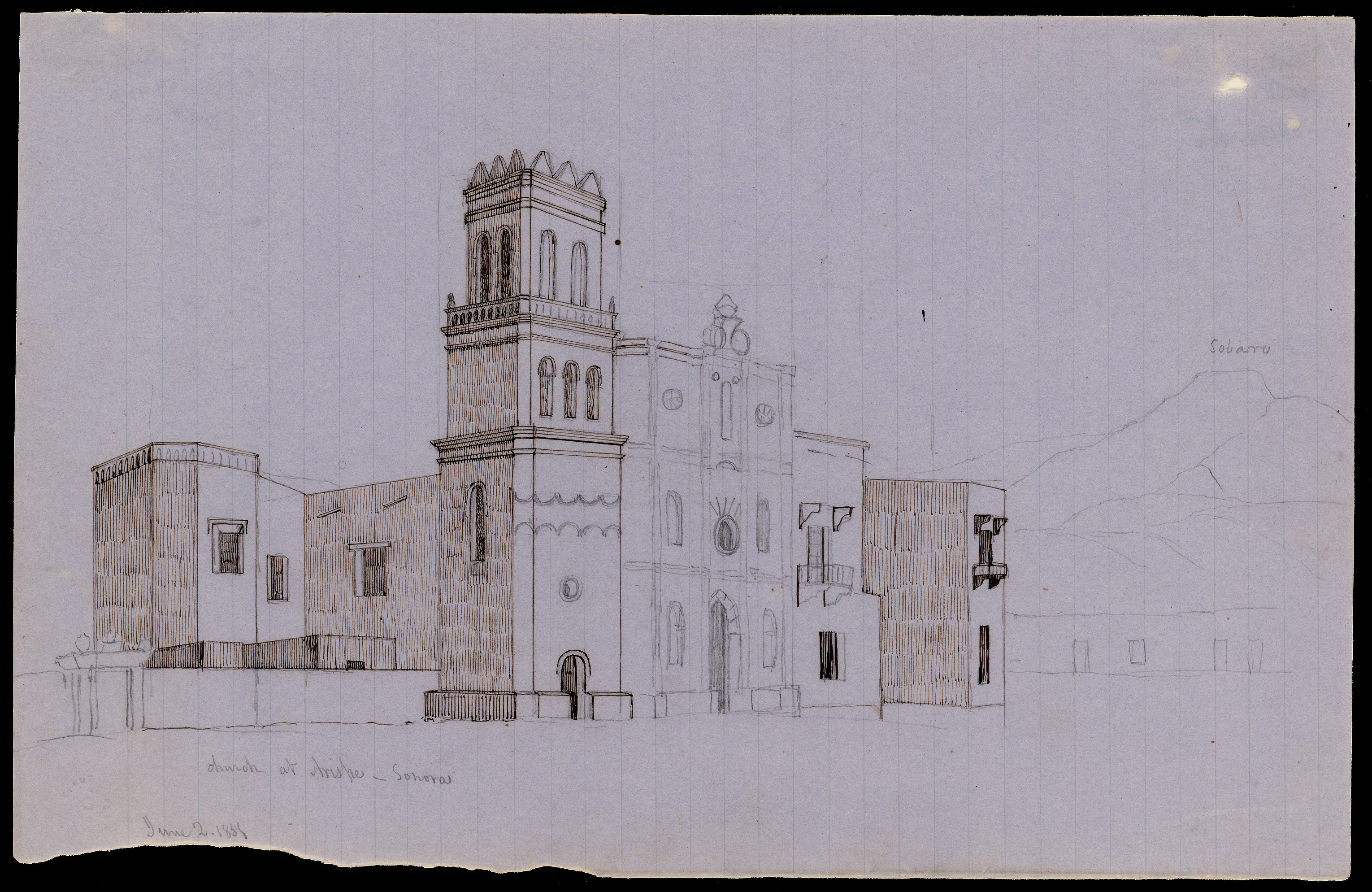

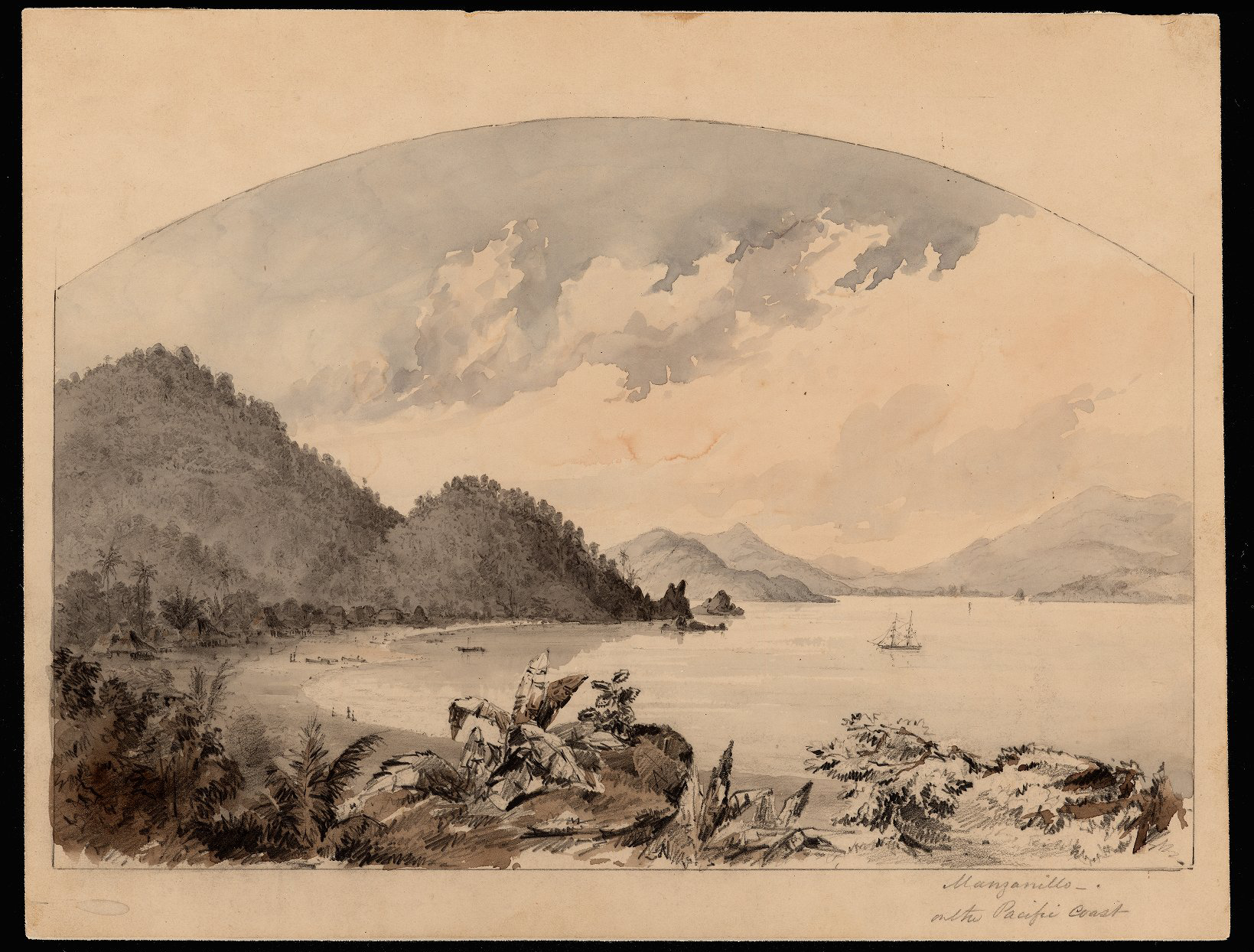

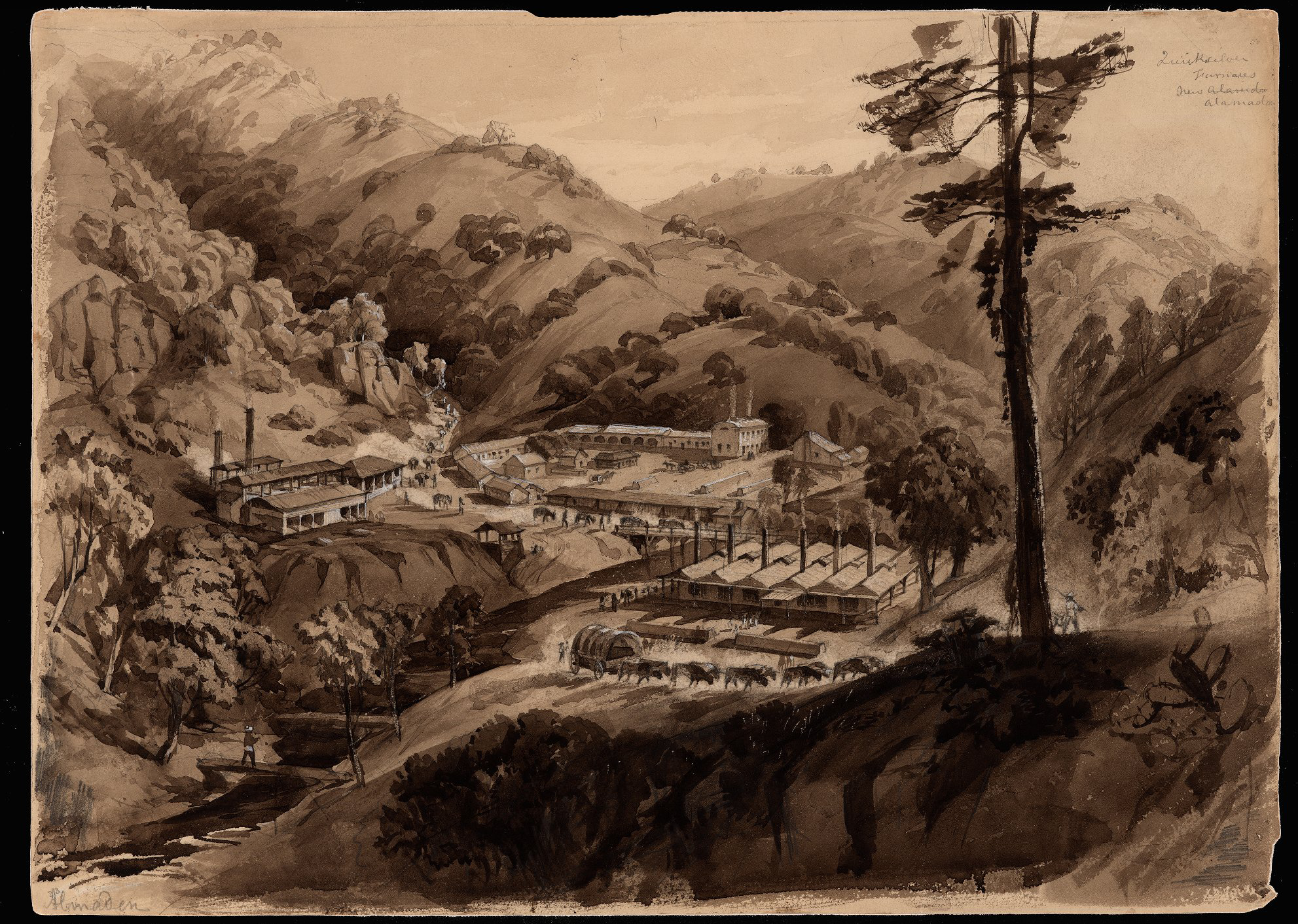

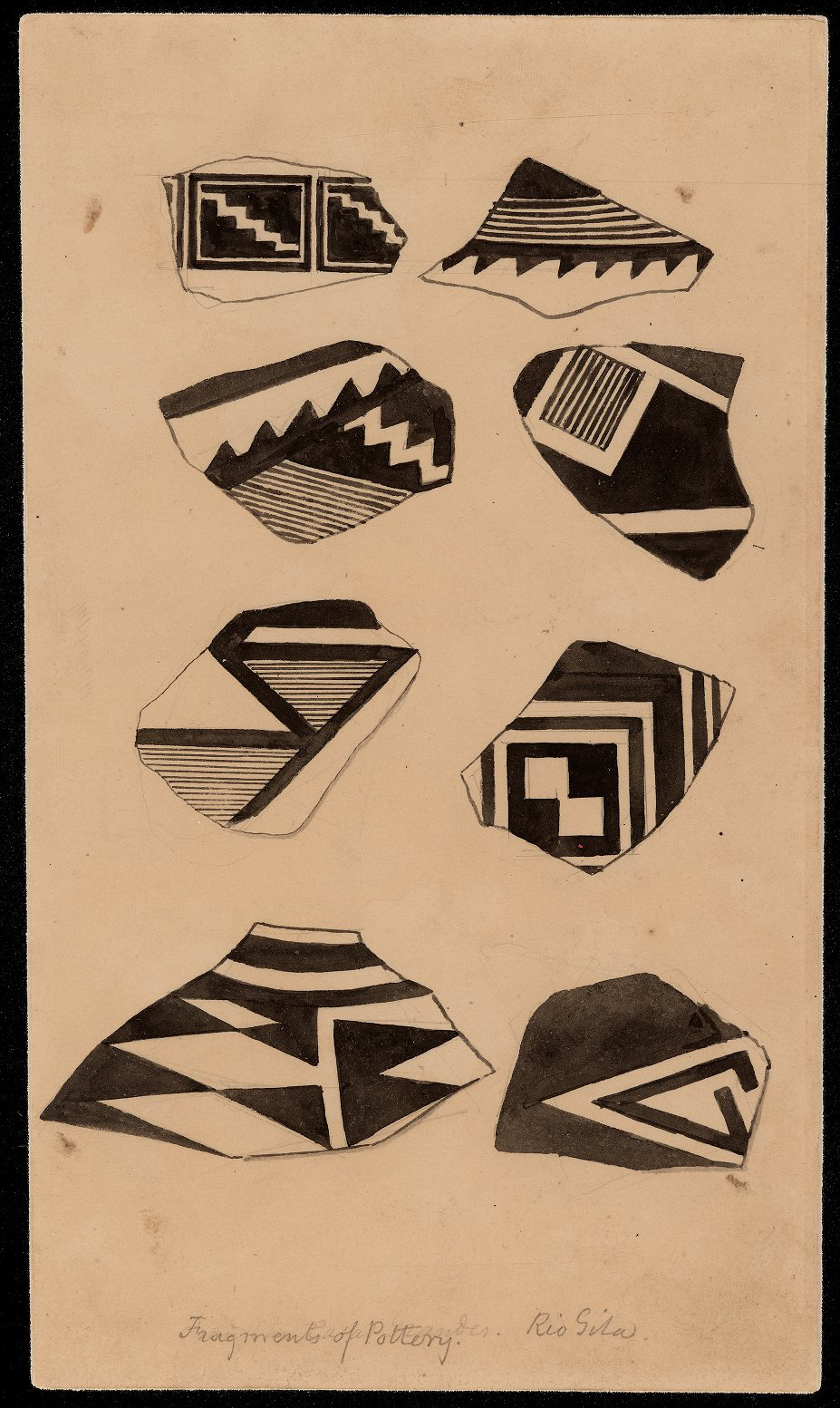

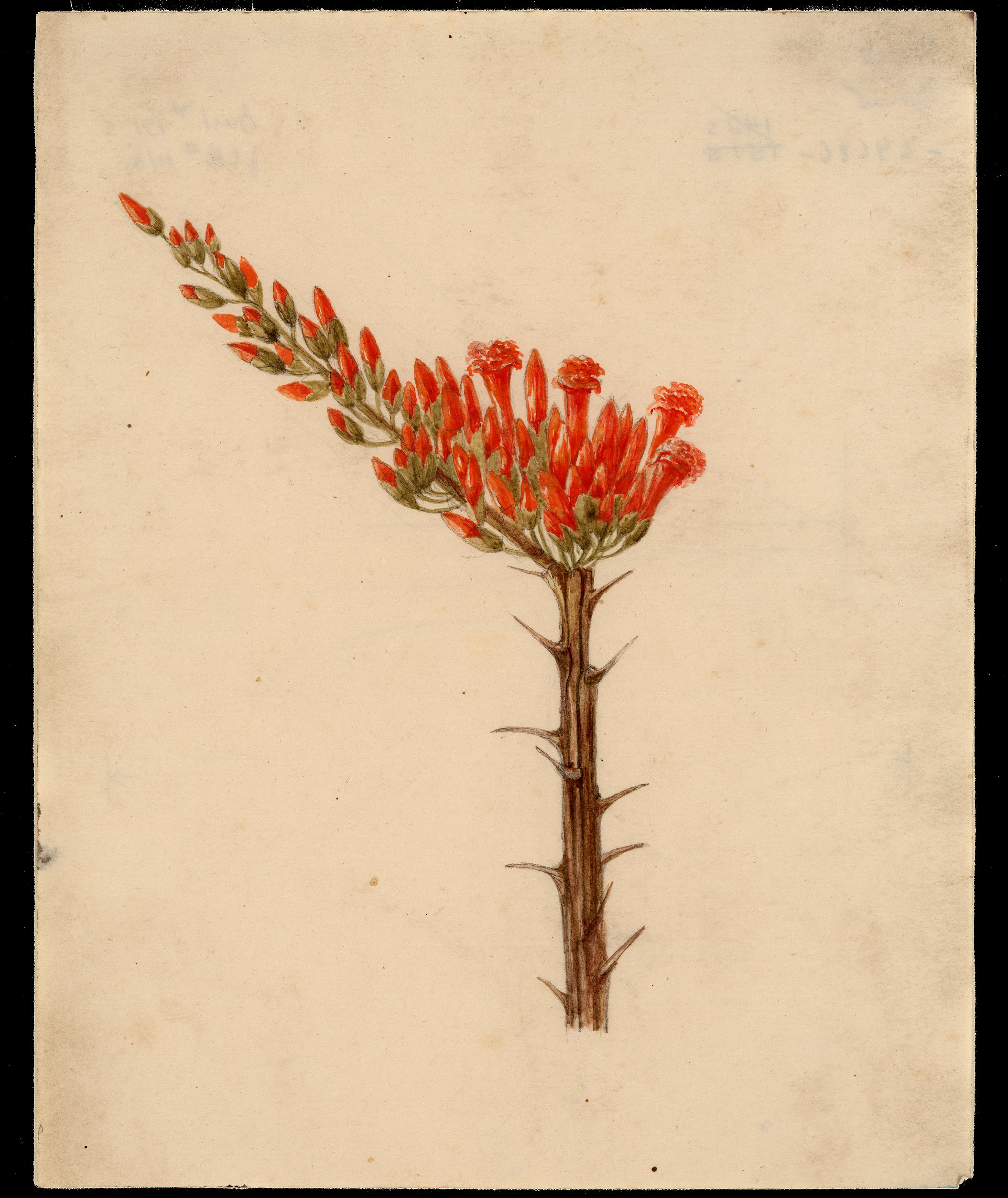

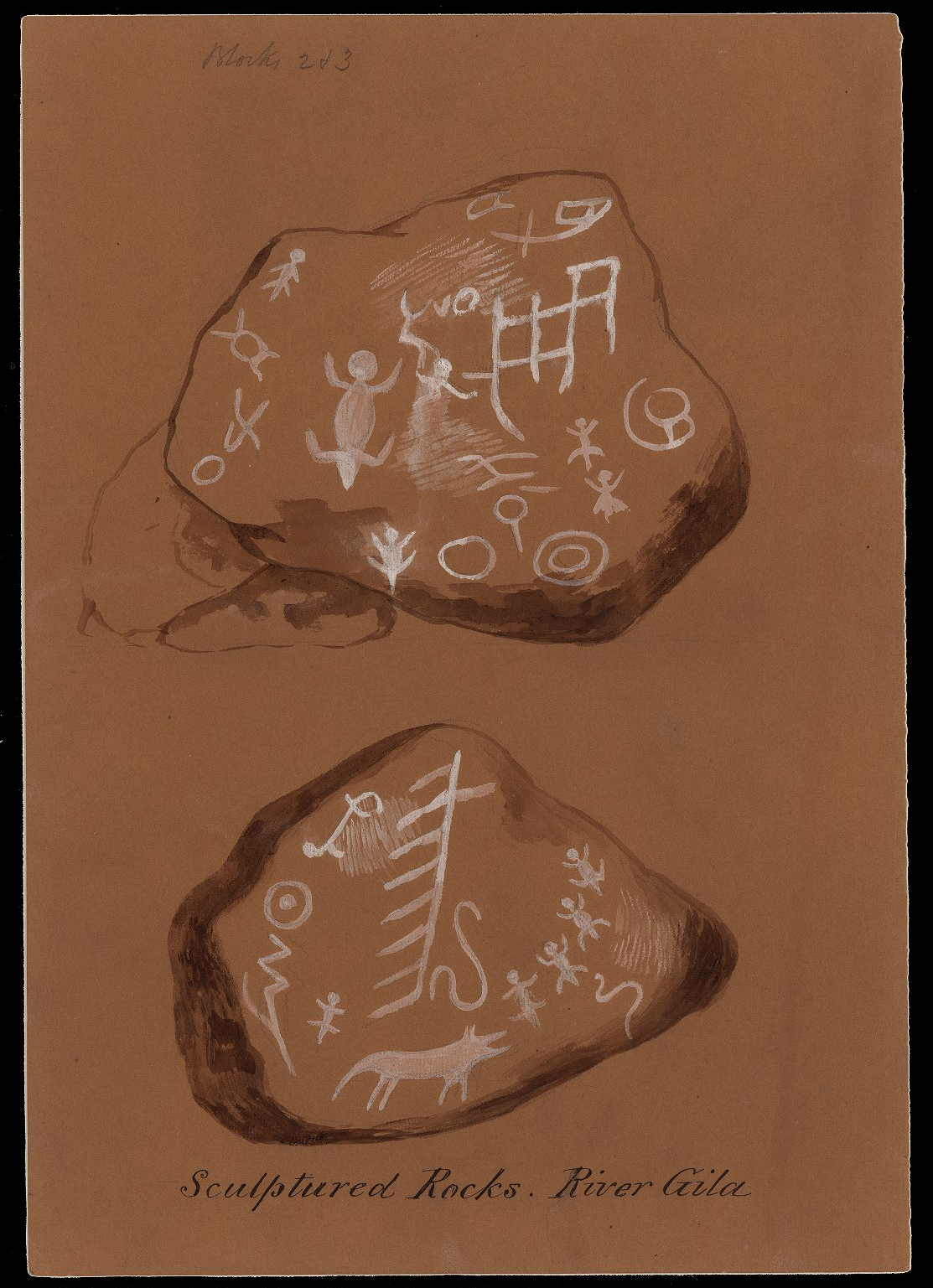

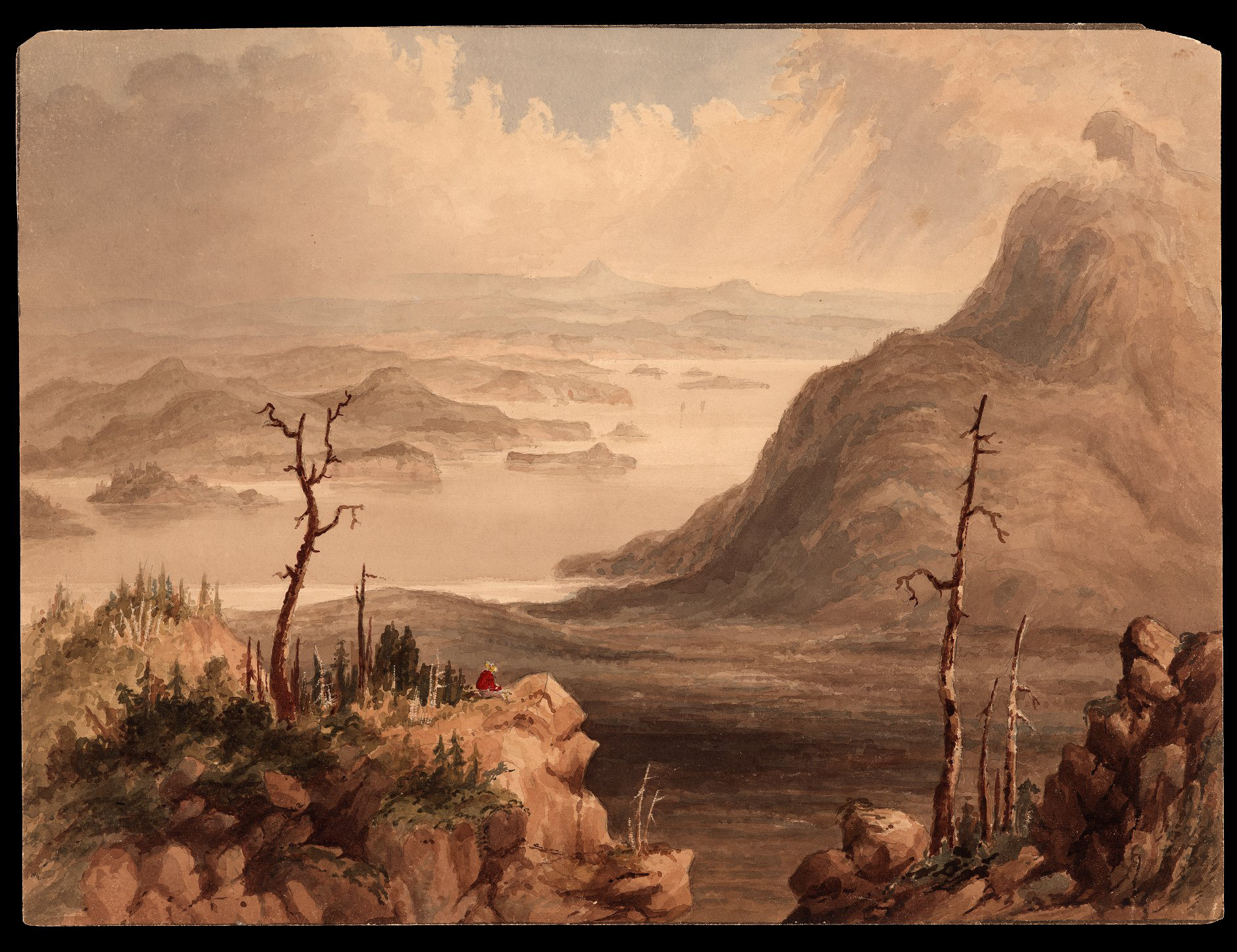

== Bibliography ==
- Hine, Robert V. (1968). Bartlett's West: Drawing the Mexican Boundary. Yale University Press.
- Hine, Robert V. (1999). "Bartlett, John Russell". American National Biography. Oxford University Press.
- Werne, Joseph Richard (2007). The Imaginary Line : a history of the United States and Mexican boundary survey, 1848-1857. Fort Worth, Tex.: Texas Christian University Press. ISBN 978-0-87565-338-9. OCLC 71200775.

Political offices
Preceded by William R. Watson	Secretary of State of Rhode Island; 1855–1872	Succeeded by Joshua M. Addeman
