= Samuel Hazzard Cross =

Samuel Hazzard Cross (1 July 1891−14 October 1946) was an expert in German and Slavic culture, particularly medieval Russian literature.

== Education ==
Cross graduated from Harvard with two degrees: a BA in 1912 and a PhD in 1916. His studies also took him to the universities of Gratz, Freiburg, Berlin, and Leningrad.

== Career ==
Following his studies, from 1917–20 Cross served in the American Army, on the American Commission to Negotiate Peace, and at the American Embassy in Belgium. From 1925–26 he both held a lectureship in European trade and economics at Georgetown University and led the U. S. Department of Commerce in Europe.

In 1927, Cross was appointed to Harvard University, first teaching German. In 1930 he became an associate of Lowell House and also chairman of the Department of Germanic Languages and Literatures.

Cross was, however, committed to developing Slavic studies both at Harvard and in the USA more generally, eventually becoming professor of Slavic languages and literature at Harvard. Among his students was Anne McCaffrey, who went on to become a major science-fiction author. Cross was managing editor of the American series of The Slavonic and East European Review; his works included Slavic Civilization through the Ages (Cambridge, Massachusetts: Harvard University Press, 1948), published posthumously and characterised by one reviewer as "certainly the best general introduction to the Slavic studies so far available in English".

=== Personal life ===
Cross married in 1918 and had three daughters. He died suddenly, of a heart attack on 14 October 1946.

== Legacy ==
After his death, Harvard established the Samuel Hazzard Cross Chair of Slavic Languages and Literatures, first filled, in January, 1950 by Roman Jakobson.
