= Daniel L. D. Granger =

Mayor of Providence, Rhode Island, US

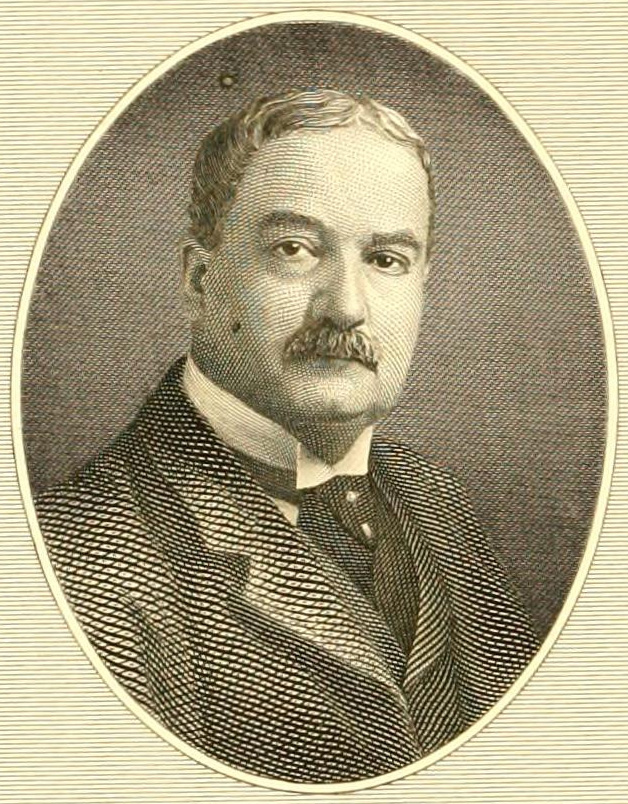

21st Mayor of Providence, Rhode Island
- In office January 1901 – January 1903
- Preceded by: William C. Baker
- Succeeded by: Augustus S. Miller

Member of the U.S. House of Representatives from Rhode Island's 1st district
- In office March 4, 1903 – February 14, 1909
- Preceded by: Melville Bull
- Succeeded by: William P. Sheffield, Jr.

Personal details
- Born: May 30, 1852 Providence, Rhode Island, U.S.
- Died: February 14, 1909 (aged 56) Washington, D.C., U.S.
- Cause of death: Heart failure
- Resting place: Swan Point Cemetery
- Party: Democratic
- Education: Brown University
- Occupation: Lawyer

Daniel Larned Davis Granger (May 30, 1852 – February 14, 1909) was a U.S. representative from Rhode Island and mayor of Providence, Rhode Island.

== Early and personal life ==
Granger was born May 30, 1852, in Providence, Rhode Island, to Dr. James N. and Anna Brown Davis Granger. Granger attended public schools.

He was graduated from Brown University, Providence, Rhode Island, in 1874 and from the law department of Boston University in 1877. In 1902 Brown awarded Granger an A.M. (Master's) degree.

Granger never married. He lived at 328 Thayer Street.

Granger belonged to numerous organizations. He was a member of the Rhode Island Historical Society; president of the Churchman's Club of Rhode Island; vice president of the American Group of Inter-parliamentary Union for the Promotion of International Arbitration; treasurer of the Dorilton Corporation of New York; member of the Psi Upsilon; member of the University Club of Providence, and the Manhattan Club of New York.

== Law career ==
He was admitted to the bar in 1877 and commenced practice in Providence, Rhode Island. He was reading clerk of the State house of representatives 1887–1890, and treasurer of Providence from January 1890 to January 1901.

== Political career ==
He served as mayor of Providence in 1901 and 1902.

Granger was elected as a Democrat to the Fifty-eighth, Fifty-ninth, and Sixtieth Congresses and served from March 4, 1903, until his death in Washington, D.C., February 14, 1909.

== Death and burial ==
Granger took sick in November 1908 in Albany. He was moved to New York City and then Washington, DC. By January 2, his condition became serious, and he died in Washington at 7:15 pm on February 14. The cause was heart failure. His funeral took place in Providence, and he was interred in Swan Point Cemetery in Providence, Rhode Island.

== See also ==
- List of members of the United States Congress who died in office (1900–1949)

Political offices
Preceded by William C. Baker	Mayor of Providence; 1901–1903	Succeeded by Augustus S. Miller
U.S. House of Representatives
Preceded by Melville Bull	Member of the U.S. House of Representatives from Rhode Island's 1st congressional district March 4, 1903 - February 14, 1909	Succeeded by William P. Sheffield, Jr.
