= Arthur Carl Victor Schott =

German-American artist and naturalist (1814–1875)

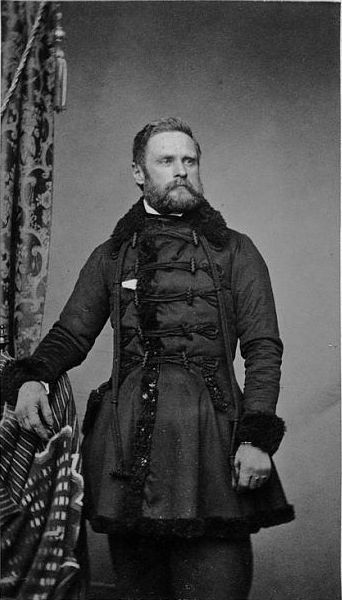
- Born: February 27, 1814; Stuttgart
- Died: July 26, 1875 (aged 61); Washington, D.C.
- Occupations: artist, topographical engineer, cartographer, botanist, geologist

Arthur Carl Victor Schott (27 February 1814 – 26 July 1875) was a German-American artist, naturalist and ethnographer. He was hired as a "special scientific collector" for the United States Boundary Commission, and participated in their survey of the new border between the United States and Mexico established after the Mexican–American War.

== Personal background ==
Schott was born on 27 February 1814, in Stuttgart, Germany. He was the son of Christian Friedrich Albert Schott. Having finished at a Gymnasium (high school) and technical school in Stuttgart, Schott worked for a year as apprentice at the Royal Gardens in Stuttgart, after which he enrolled at the Institute of Agriculture at Hohenheim.

== Professional background ==
After the U.S.-Mexican War in which Mexico had to cede almost half of its territory, now comprising much of the American Southwest, it became necessary to survey and map the new, nearly 2,000 miles (3,200 km) of border between the two countries.

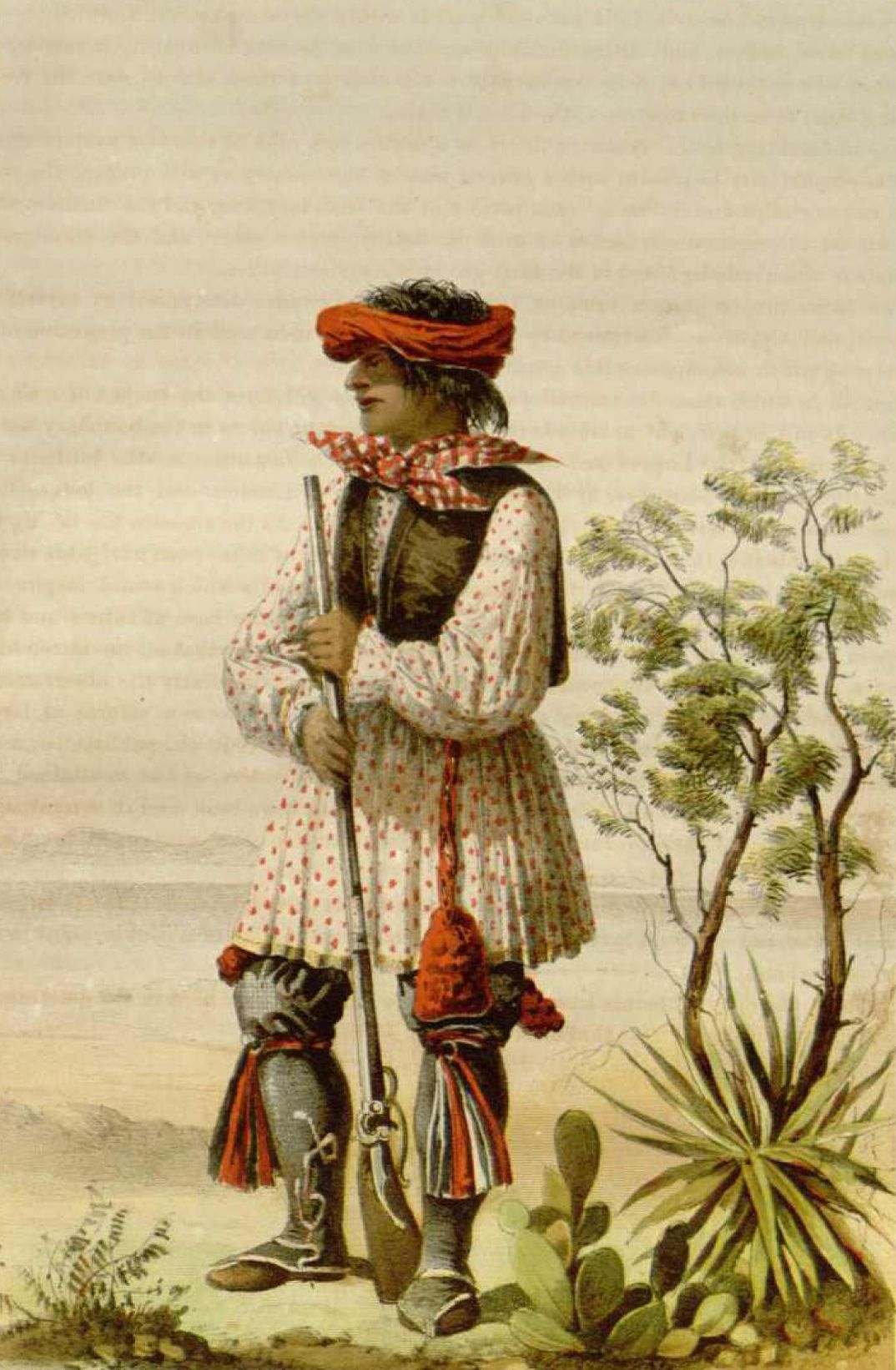
Seminole Chief 'Grizzly Bear'

In 1851, Schott was approached by the United States Boundary Commission to act as "special scientific collector". He consequently worked as a member of William H. Emory's team in mapping the border separating Texas and the adjacent Mexican territory. Schott contributed more field data to the border maps than any other member of the team, and "became one of the first surveyors of the Rio Grande". He participated in the describing and collecting of botanical, geological, and zoological specimens, also sketching landscapes and members of Indian tribes. Schott also studied the vegetation of Washington, D.C., and for a period worked on the US Coast Survey.

The lithographs and engravings made by Schott in Texas were included in Emory's The United States and Mexican Boundary Survey. Schott produced illustrations of Seminole, Lipan Apache, and Kiowa Indians, also of the Military Plaza in San Antonio, the Mexican military at Piedras Negras and of the Rio Grande. Schott's interests also covered Texas geology in that he analysed sediments and fossils from the Rio Grande basin in an attempt to understand the sea-inundation history of the area. On completion of the border survey, Schott examined the possibility of a ship canal across the Isthmus of Darien, while collecting natural history specimens in Yucatán. In the field of botany he collected specimens of algae and phanerogams from Austria, Colombia, Hungary, Mexico (where he was part of Yucatán's Scientific Commission), and the United States.

== Death ==
Upon his death in 1875, he left a widow, Augusta, and six children.

== Legacy ==
Schott is commemorated in the scientific names of two North American reptiles: Masticophis schotti and Urosaurus ornatus schottii. He also left many important historical drawings, such as those of the Mexico-US border, the San Antonio Texas Main Plaza, and a complete series of 12 of Yucatán's churches.

The standard author abbreviation A.Schott is used to indicate this person as the author when citing a botanical name.
