= Wanskuck Park =

Public park in Providence, Rhode Island

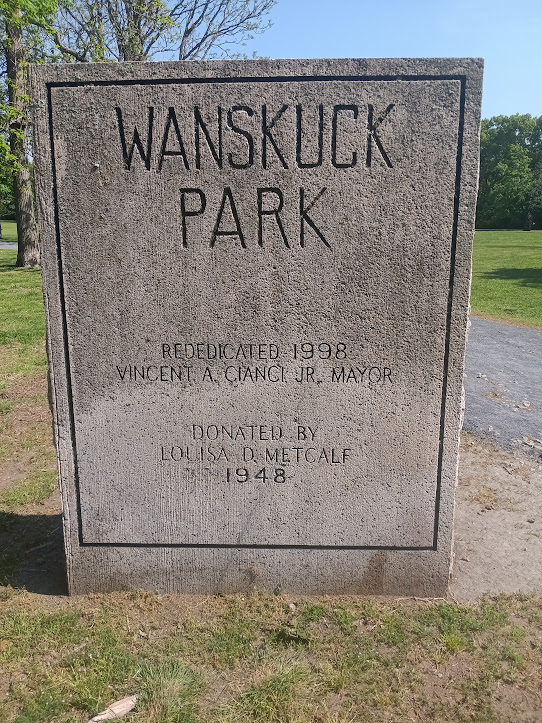
- Entrance marker at Wanskuck Park

- Location within Rhode Island
- Type: Public park
- Location: Providence, Rhode Island, U.S.
- Nearest city: Providence
- Coordinates: 41°51′29″N 71°25′54″W
- Area: 25 acres (10 ha)
- Created: 1948
- Operator: Providence Parks Department
- Open: All year
- Status: Open

Wanskuck Park, originally known as Metcalf Park, is a public park in the Wanskuck neighborhood of Providence, Rhode Island. The grounds, formerly the Metcalf family country estate, were given to the city in 1948 by Louisa Dexter Sharpe Metcalf. The park lies at the northern end of the Wanskuck Historic District.

== History ==
The land that now forms Wanskuck Park was the country estate of Helen Adelia Rowe Metcalf (1830–1895), a principal founder of the Rhode Island School of Design, and Jesse Metcalf Sr. (1827–1899), one of the three founders of the Wanskuck Company, a major woolen goods producer. The Metcalfs established the estate around 1870, building a 2½-story, cross-gable-roofed house with a wraparound veranda on a hillside north of the mill.

In April 1948, Louisa Dexter Sharpe Metcalf (1866–1959) — the daughter-in-law of the original owners and widow of their son, Senator Jesse H. Metcalf (1860–1942) — gave the homestead and grounds to the City of Providence for use as a public park, together with a $30,000 fund for its development. At her request, the park was initially named Metcalf Park.

== Landscape ==
The Metcalf mansion was demolished by the city in 1949 in accordance with a provision of the gift, along with the estate's main barn; a stable that survived the initial clearance was removed in 1979 after repeated vandalism.

The park retains elements of the former estate. Three outbuildings remain: a 1½-story caretaker's cottage with a veranda, a barn with a jerkinhead hay hatch, and a shed-roof garage. A stone wall runs along part of the Woodward Road frontage, and a wrought-iron gate survives at the entrance. A double row of trees marks the former carriage drive that once led to the mansion, whose foundation is still visible on the site. The grounds consist of an undulating expanse of lawn with informal plantings of trees and shrubs, with a wooded section at the northern end of the park.

A loop path approximately a half-mile long runs from the Woodward Road entrance gates through the central field and the wooded area before returning; in total the park contains about a mile of walking trails, rated as very easy.

In 1866, Helen Adelia Rowe Metcalf led the Metcalf family's donation of land and funds for the construction of the Roger Williams Chapel, which still stands directly across Woodward Road from the park entrance.

== Wanskuck Historic District ==
Wanskuck Park is on the northern end of the Wanskuck Historic District, a mill village preserved on the National Register of Historic Places. The district also includes the Wanskuck Mill (1862–1864), the Steere Worsted Mill (1884–1886), Wanskuck Hall (1884), more than sixty company-built mill houses, and St. Edward Roman Catholic Church (1885–1889).

== Sources ==
- "Mrs. Metcalf Dies; Widow of Senator". The Providence Journal. Providence, Rhode Island. October 7, 1959. p. 22.
- Rhode Island Historical Preservation Commission (1983). Wanskuck Historic District (PDF) (Report). National Park Service. NRHP Nomination Form.
- "History and Tradition". Rhode Island School of Design.
- "Wanskuck Mill Village". Guide to Providence Architecture. Providence Preservation Society. 2003.
- "Wanskuck Park". Explore Rhode Island. Rhode Island Blueways Alliance and Rhode Island Land Trust Council. August 1, 2023.
