= Jane Anthony Davis =

American painter (1821–1855)

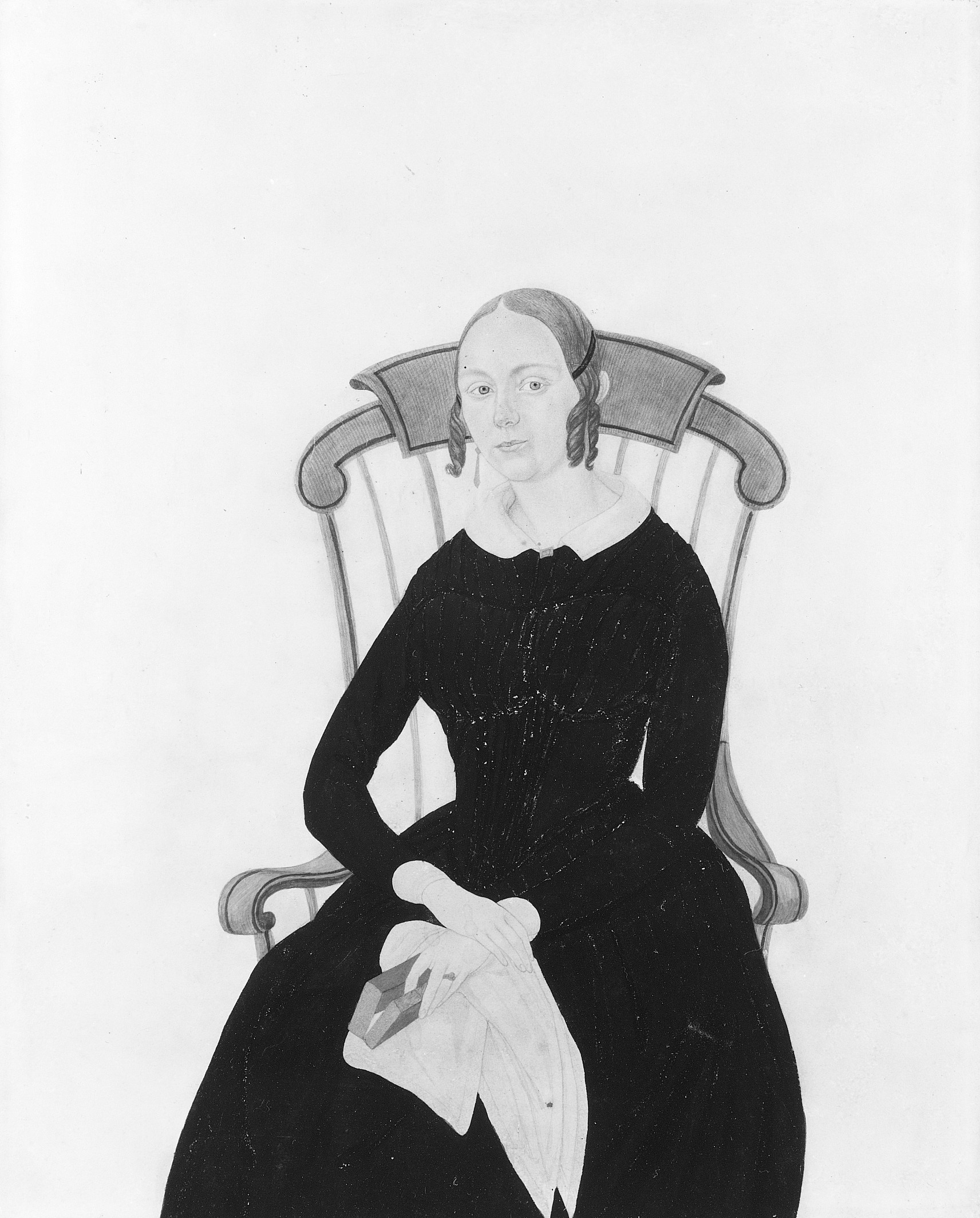
Lady Seated in a Boston Rocker, n.d., watercolor and graphite on paper, in the collection of the Metropolitan Museum of Art

Jane Anthony Davis (September 2, 1821 – April 1855), was an American artist. Until 1981 she was known only as J. A. Davis.

Davis was born Jane Anthony in Warwick, Rhode Island, the daughter of Giles Anthony and Sara Robinson Greene. In 1838, she briefly attended the Warren Ladies Seminary (in Rhode Island). She married Edward Nelson Davis of Norwich, Connecticut on February 1, 1841, and lived with him in that town for a time. On January 10, 1842, she gave birth to a child. The family moved to Providence, Rhode Island; there she gave birth to another child, her second, on April 26, 1847. In August 1854, she produced her last portrait, of Luella Hodges. She died of tuberculosis eight months later, and was buried in Swan Point Cemetery in Providence.

It was common for women artists of the era to sign their work using only their initials, and Davis was no different in this regard; consequently, it was for many years assumed that she was male. In 1981, collectors Sybil and Arthur Kern identified the artist by name, further confirming their identification with two later reports. She produced miniature portraits, working in watercolor and pencil. Most of Davis's subjects are depicted in three-quarter view, at bust length. Often they are clothed in black. Several characteristics appear in many of her depictions: a ragged part in the hair, bluish coloring of the eyelids, a wide and colored horizontal band below the bust, and negative space between the subject's arms and body. The artist sometimes incorporated flowers into her compositions. Many pieces were signed and dated; some also included the subject's name. Davis is known to have produced over 200 portraits, mostly of residents of the areas in which she lived. Three of her unsigned pieces were at one time mistakenly attributed to James Ellsworth, and later to Alexander Emmons; three others were mistakenly attributed to Joseph H. Davis and Eben Davis.

An undated portrait by Davis, Lady Seated in a Boston Rocker, is owned by the Metropolitan Museum of Art. Another piece, a family portrait, appeared on Antiques Roadshow in 2003, where it was appraised at between $25,000 and $35,000.
