= The Great American Hall of Wonders =

Exhibition and catalog organized in 2011

The Great American Hall of Wonders: Art, Science, and Invention in the Nineteenth Century
- Author: Claire Perry
- Language: English
- Subject: United States history
- Publisher: Washington, D.C. : Smithsonian American Art Museum; London : In association with D Giles Ltd.
- Publication date: 2011
- Publication place: United States
- Media type: Hardcover, paperback
- ISBN: 978-1-904832-97-3
- OCLC: 703623559

The Great American Hall of Wonders was an exhibition and catalog organized in 2011 by the Smithsonian American Art Museum. The exhibit explored a number of themes pertinent to 19th century United States: clocks, Niagara Falls, guns, buffalos, railroads, and "big trees." Works displayed included patent illustrations, advertisements, and artworks.

== List of artists ==
Among the artists, illustrators, photographers and inventors exhibited:

- John James Audubon
- John James Barralet
- Albert Bierstadt
- Richard Norris Brooke
- George Catlin
- Frederic Edwin Church
- James Goodwyn Clonney
- Thomas Cole
- Jasper Francis Cropsey
- Currier and Ives
- Ferdinand Danton Jr.
- Felix Octavius Carr Darley
- Joseph H. Davis
- Charles Deas
- Thomas Doughty
- Robert S. Duncanson
- Asher B. Durand
- Thomas Eakins
- Francis William Edmonds
- John Whetton Ehninger
- Alvan Fisher
- James Gardner
- Ernest Griset
- William Michael Harnett
- Robert Havell
- Martin Johnson Heade
- Thomas Hill
- Winslow Homer
- Daniel Huntington
- George Inness
- Augustus Koch
- John Lewis Krimmel
- Arthur Lumley
- Thomas Moran
- Samuel Finley Breese Morse
- William Sidney Mount
- Eadweard Muybridge
- Thomas Nast
- William Notman
- Bass Otis
- Charles Willson Peale
- Raphaelle Peale
- Henry Cheever Pratt
- William Ranney
- John Rapkin
- Andrew Joseph Russell
- F.L. Seitz
- Lilly Martin Spencer
- John Mix Stanley
- Eli Terry
- John Trumbull
- Elihu Vedder
- Carleton Watkins
- Alexander Wilson
- Henry Worrall
- Thomas Worth
