= List of presidents of the Rhode Island School of Design =

The following is a list of presidents of the Rhode Island School of Design (RISD).

#	Image	President	Life	Tenure	RISD class	Events
1		Claudius Buchanan Farnsworth	1815–1897	1877–1888	–	The Rhode Island School of Design teaches its first classes in the Hoppin Homestead building in Downtown Providence (1878). The school constructs its first purpose-built building (the Waterman Building) and moves to College Hill (1893).
2		Royal C. Taft	1823–1912	1888–1890	–	
3		Alfred Henry Littlefield	1829–1893	June 11–27, 1890	–	Resigned after a few days.
4		Herbert W. Ladd	1843–1913	1891–1896	–	
5		William Carey Poland	1846–1929	1896–1907	–	RISD acquires Memorial Hall on Benefit Street (1903), marking the school's physical expansion beyond a single building.
6		Isaac Comstock Bates	1843–1913	1907–1913	–	
7		Eliza Greene Metcalf Radeke	1854–1931	1913–1931	–	Radeke works to develop and expand the collection of the RISD Museum; she gives financially to the school, funding the construction of a wing at the museum that today bears her name.
8		Helen Metcalf Danforth	1887–1984	1931–1947	–	RISD earns the right to grant college degrees (as opposed to certificates) (1932). The school constructs the College Building on College Street (1936) and the Auditorium fronting Market Square (1941) and acquires Market House (1938). RISD gains full accreditation as an art school (1949). Day student enrollment grows but still remains smaller than night student enrollment (1948).
9		Max W. Sullivan	1909–1990	1947–1955	–	
10		John R. Frazier	1889–1966	1955–1962	–	
11		Albert Bush-Brown	1926–1994	1962–1968	–	
Interim		Donald M. Lay, Jr.	1915–1999	1968–1969	–	RISD launches its first Wintersession (1969).
12		Talbot Rantoul	1912–1989	1969–1975	–	The Woods–Gerry House is restored. RISD purchases the Bayard-Ewing Building (1975), pushing the school's presence southward along South Main Street.
13		Lee Hall	1934–2017	1975–1983	–	Hall was part of the effort to introduce the first computer system for the school administration, she was in leadership during the unionization of the faculty, she worked to revision of the faculty manual, and restructure the financial administration.
14		Thomas F. Schutte	1935–2025	1983–1992	–	RISD opens the Design Center in Hope Block and Cheapside (1986) and acquires 20 Washington Place (1988).
Interim		Louis A. Fazzano	1921–2019	1992–1993	–	
15		E. Roger Mandle	1941–2020	1993–2008	–	RISD purchases and renovates the Rhode Island Hospital Trust Building, expanding student housing capacity by 65% and shifting the epicenter of campus away from Benefit Street. The RISD Museum completes a significant physical expansion led by architect Rafael Moneo (2008). An undergraduate dual degree program is established with Brown University (2008). RISD's endowment grows from $67 million to $367 million.
16		John Maeda	b. 1966	2008–2013	–	The school's endowment drops after the 2008 financial crisis. Maeda makes a concerted effort to integrate digital technology into the school's historically analog-oriented pedagogy. The faculty vote "no confidence" in Maeda (2011).
17		Rosanne Somerson	b. 1954	2015–2021	1976	RISD leverages philanthropy to expand financial aid. The school releases a Social Equity and Inclusion Action Plan (2017). RISD constructs its first new dorm in 34 years (2019) and undertakes a multi-phase overhaul of underclassmen residence halls. Campus closes and re-opens in response to the COVID-19 pandemic.
Interim		David R. Proulx	1970–2022	2021–2022		
18		Crystal Williams	b. 1970	April 2022–	–	Williams is named RISD's 18th president, making her the first African-American to hold the position.
