= Louisa Sharpe Metcalf =

American philanthropist

Louisa Dexter Sharpe Metcalf
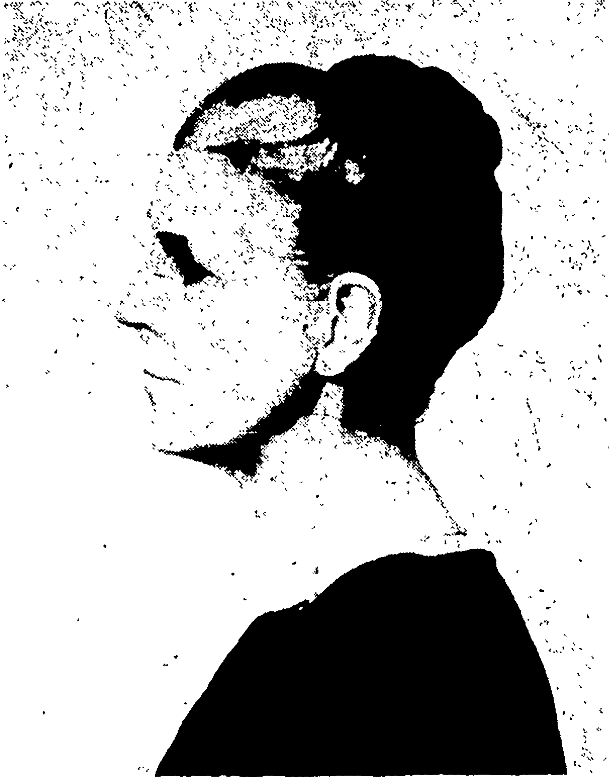
- Born: Louisa Dexter Sharpe; August 4, 1866; Providence, Rhode Island, U.S.
- Died: October 6, 1959 (aged 93); Providence, Rhode Island, U.S.
- Burial place: Swan Point Cemetery, Providence, RI
- Education: Miss Abbott's school
- Occupation: Philanthropist
- Known for: Wanskuck Park and a named chair at Brown University
- Spouse: Jesse H. Metcalf (m. 1909–1942)
- Parent(s): Lucian Sharpe and Louisa (Dexter) Sharpe
- Awards: Medal of French Gratitude

Louisa Dexter Sharpe Metcalf (1866–1959) was a Providence, Rhode Island, philanthropist. She was a member of the Sharpe family associated with the Brown & Sharpe Manufacturing Company, and her husband was United States Senator Jesse H. Metcalf. She supported cultural, educational, and civic institutions in Rhode Island, helped establish a neighborhood center in northern Providence, contributed to relief efforts during and after World War I, and later donated the former Metcalf estate to create Wanskuck Park in Providence.

== Early life and family ==
Metcalf was born in Providence, Rhode Island, on August 4, 1866, the daughter of Lucian Sharpe and Louisa (Dexter) Sharpe. Her father was a partner in the Brown & Sharpe Manufacturing Company and held positions with the Providence Institution for Savings, the Bank of North America, the Providence Gas Company, and the Providence Journal Company. Her siblings included Henry Dexter Sharpe (1872–1954), who later served as president of Brown & Sharpe, Mary Dexter (Sharpe) Chafee (1860–1934), Ellen Dexter Sharpe (1861–1953), Amey Dexter (Sharpe) Peters (1864–1951), and Lucian Sharpe Jr. (1871–1931).

Metcalf was educated at Miss Abbott’s School for Young Ladies in Providence, where "modern languages, ancient history, and art lent ballast to the traditional curriculum of dancing, gymnastics, and edifying verse."

During her youth, Metcalf was a wide-ranging traveler. She journeyed around the world and across the United States, including walking down to the Colorado River and back during a visit to the Grand Canyon.

On June 25, 1909, she married Jesse H. Metcalf (1860–1942), a textile manufacturer, civic leader, former United States Representative and future United States Senator. The couple had no children.

== Philanthropy and service ==
=== Branch Avenue Neighborhood Center ===
In 1913 the Metcalfs founded the Branch Avenue Neighborhood Center at the Wanskuck Boys' Club in northern Providence (now the Boys & Girls Clubs of Providence), providing space for children's recreation and craft activities. Metcalf attended its annual exercises and exhibitions, where she awarded prizes for the children's work.

=== American Red Cross and World War I ===
Metcalf supported local relief and community organizations and participated in wartime charitable work during World War I through the American Red Cross. During and after the war she worked for the Providence Chapter of the American Red Cross, where she had charge of the purchase of all supplies. Drawing on her European travels and friendships, she also managed a workshop in Paris founded by Francis Fenwick that distributed three million francs to the poor, refugees, and soldiers. For her relief work, she was awarded the Medal of French Gratitude in 1919, and the Government of Serbia conferred a decoration on her for her contributions to Serbian Relief.

During the Great Depression, in 1932, Metcalf served as Honorary Chairman of the Emergency Red Cross, overseeing the distribution of cotton goods and personally teaching women how to sew garments from available materials.

=== Rhode Island Hospital ===
In 1929 Metcalf gave a new men's dormitory to Rhode Island Hospital, one of her husband's longstanding institutional interests. She had earlier participated with members of her family in the founding gift of the Jane Brown Memorial Hospital building.

=== Rhode Island Foundation ===
Metcalf supported a range of cultural and charitable organizations in Rhode Island. She and her husband were among the early donors to the Rhode Island Foundation, a statewide community foundation. In her will she established the Louisa D. Sharpe Metcalf Fund, an unrestricted gift of $1 million for the foundation.

=== Universities ===
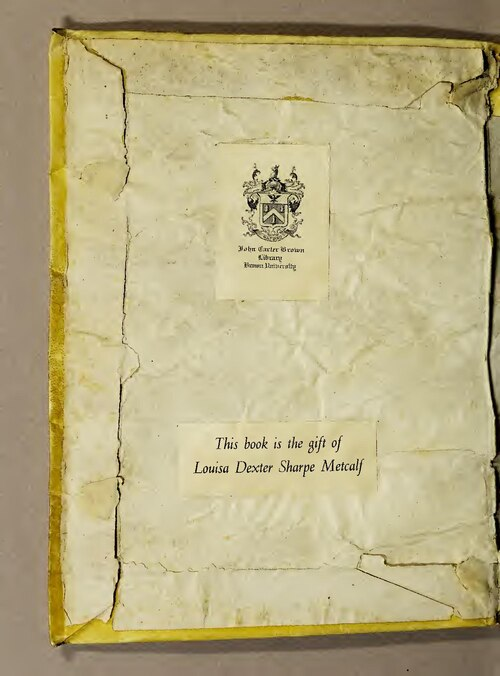
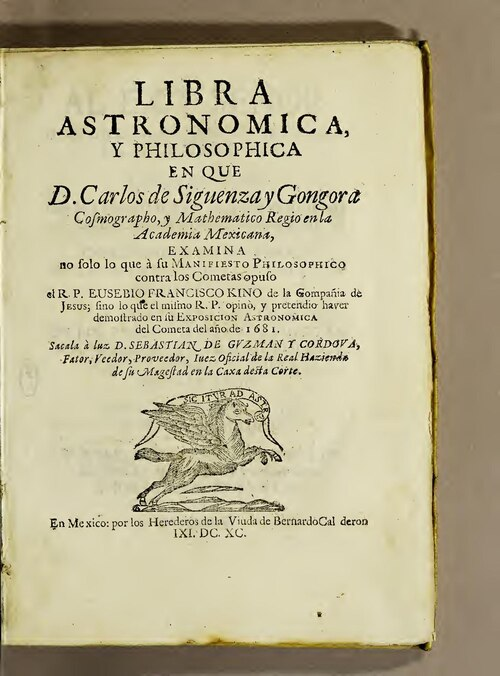
Libra astronomica (1690) donated by L. Metcalf

Beginning in the early twentieth century Metcalf contributed to the Rhode Island School of Design and maintained correspondence with the RISD Museum during the 1930s and 1940s concerning acquisitions and institutional affairs.

The Metcalfs endowed the Jesse H. & Louisa D. Sharpe Metcalf Chair in Chemistry at Brown University.

Metcalf owned a collection of rare books and manuscripts, several of which she donated to the John Carter Brown Library. These included early printed works such as Libra astronomica, y philosophica (1690) and Auss America, das ist, auss der Newen Welt (1620). Additional items from her collection were dispersed after her death, including medieval and Renaissance manuscripts such as the Ottobeuren Gradual and Sacramentary (c. 1164) and the Psalter of the Prince d'Anjou (before 1537).

=== Restorations ===
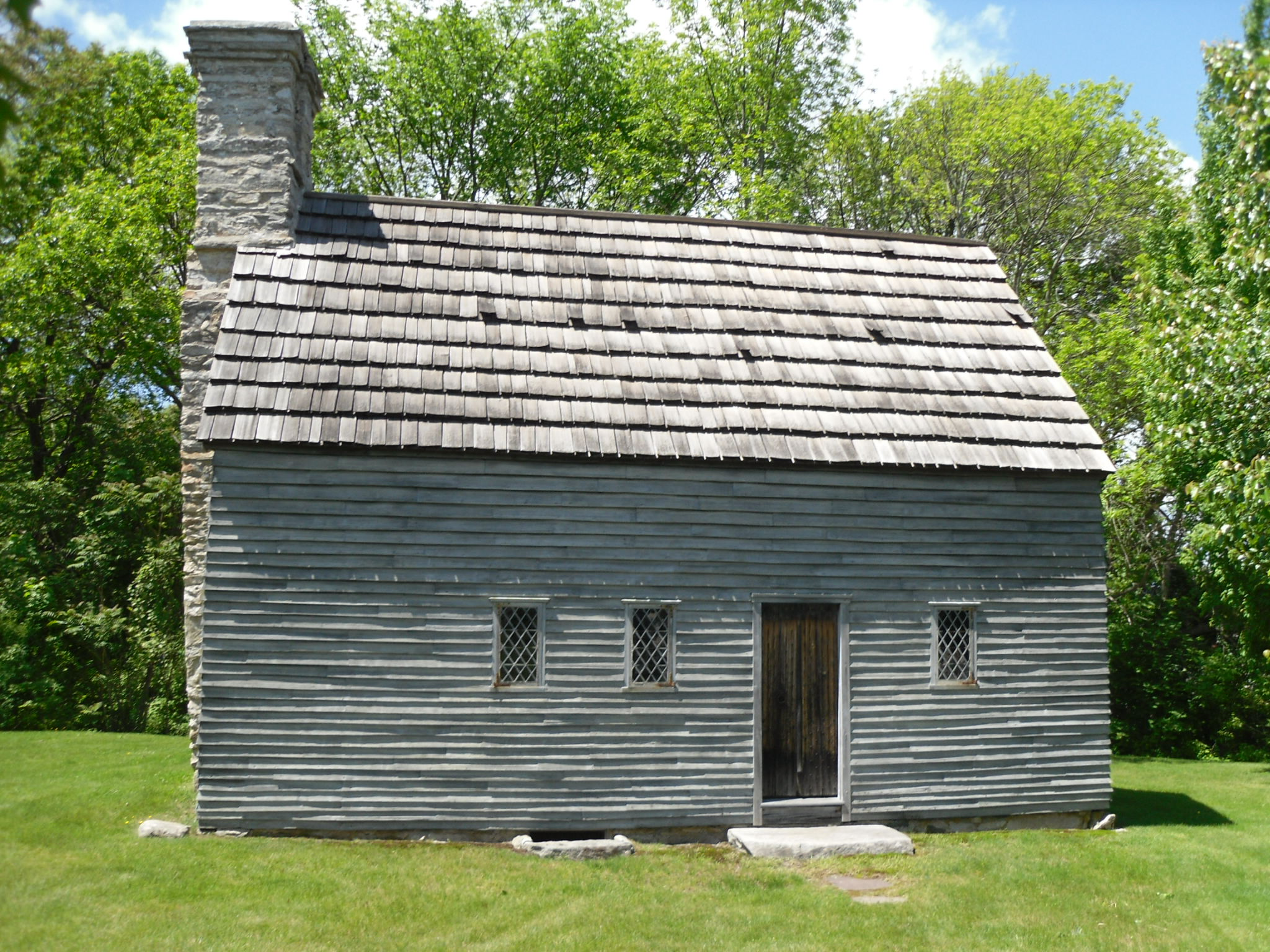
Clemence-Irons House in RI

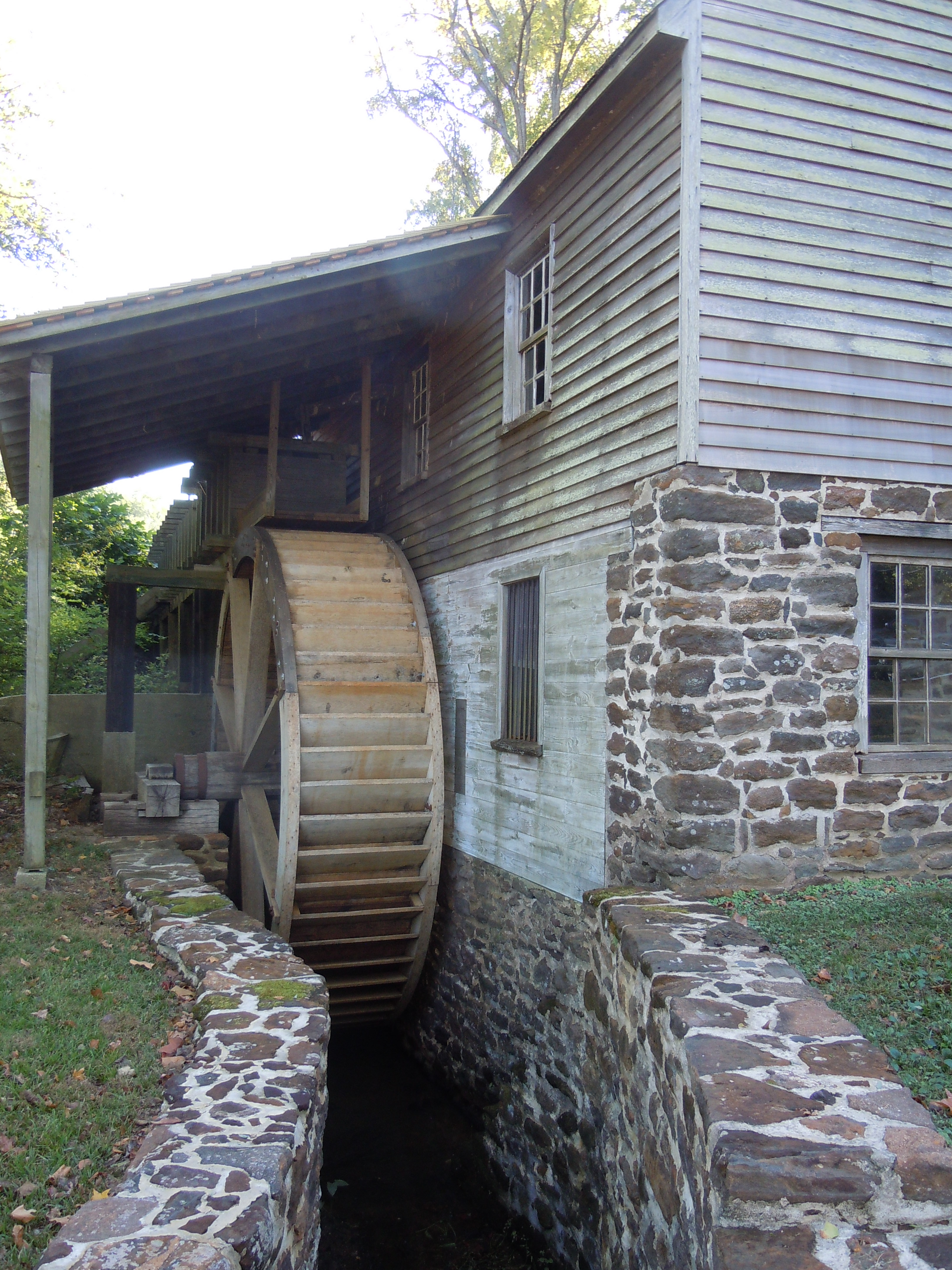
Stratford Mill in VA

In 1938, Metcalf and her siblings Henry D. Sharpe and Ellen D. Sharpe purchased the seventeenth-century Clemence–Irons House in Johnston, Rhode Island. Recognizing the building as a rare surviving stone-ender, they commissioned preservation architect Norman Isham to restore the structure to its 1691 appearance. In June 1947 the three siblings donated the house to the Society for the Preservation of New England Antiquities (now Historic New England).

In 1939 the Metcalfs funded the restoration of an 18th-century gristmill at Stratford in Montross, Virginia. At its rededication, Metcalf pulled the lever that set the waterwheel and old wooden machinery in motion, grinding cornmeal for Virginia johnnycakes. It is regarded as "one of the best operating mill reconstructions in the United States."

=== Public engagement ===
Although not herself a candidate for office, Metcalf occasionally appeared on her husband's behalf during his political career. In October 1930, while Jesse H. Metcalf was a sitting U.S. Senator, she substituted for him in delivering a political address before the Women's Republican Club of South Kingstown and Narragansett, urging women to enter political life.

=== Metcalf Grove in California ===
The Metcalf Grove is an approximately 960-acre stand of old-growth coast redwood (Sequoia sempervirens) in Jedediah Smith Redwoods State Park in Del Norte County, California. The tract was acquired for the State of California in 1939 through a donation from the Metcalfs, sparing it from logging, and was formally dedicated by the Save the Redwoods League in 1942.

The grove is marked by a cast bronze plaque installed in 1942 on a boulder beside Howland Hill Road; it reads: "This grove is given to the State of California for the preservation of these ancient trees by Mr. and Mrs. Jesse H. Metcalf of Rhode Island."

=== SS Jesse H. Metcalf ===
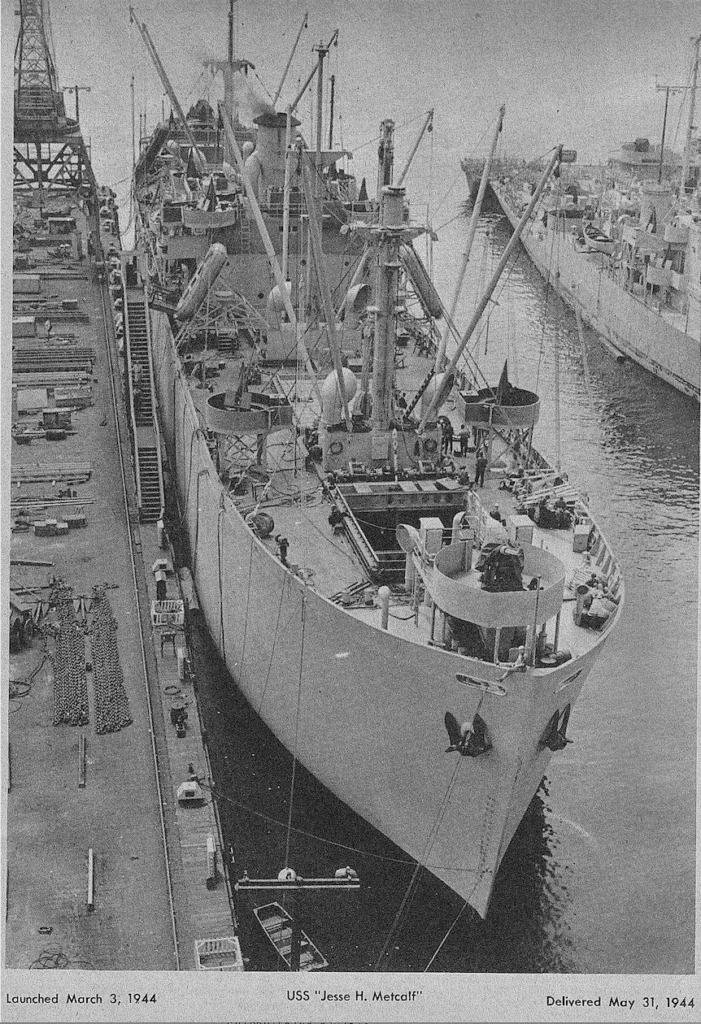
USS Jesse H. Metcalf

On March 4, 1944, Metcalf christened the 31st Liberty ship constructed at the former Walsh-Kaiser shipyard in Providence as the SS Jesse H. Metcalf, named in honor of her late husband. She was presented with an inscribed silver dish at the sponsors' dinner following the ceremony, and later that year she gave the ship a complete library.

=== Wanskuck Park ===
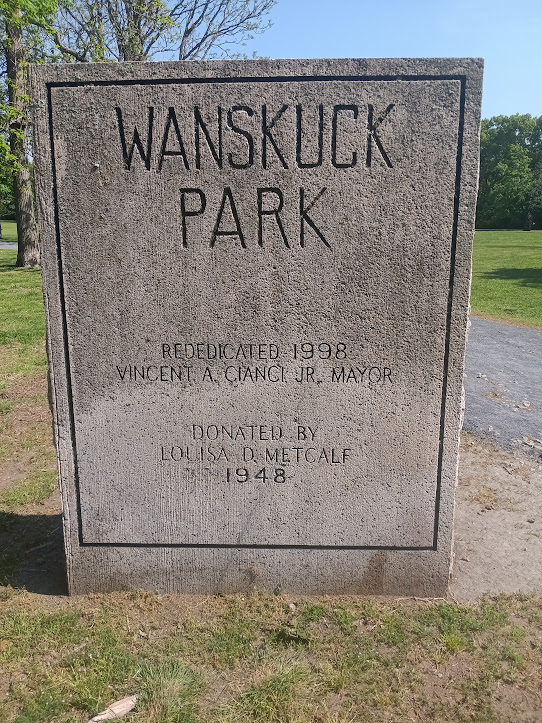
Wanskuck Park marker

In April 1948, several years after the death of her husband, Metcalf donated the former Metcalf estate on Woodward Road in the Wanskuck section of Providence to the city for use as a public park, together with a $30,000 fund for its development. Known initially as Metcalf Park, the property is now Wanskuck Park. Several features of the former estate remain, including the wrought-iron gate, mature trees, the original drive, and the stone wall along Woodward Road.

== Death ==
Metcalf entered Jane Brown Hospital in Providence on August 16, 1959, and died there after a long illness on October 6, 1959, at the age of 93. Her funeral was held at the First Unitarian Church on Benefit Street (formerly the First Congregational Church), and she was buried at Swan Point Cemetery.

The last of her generation in the Sharpe family, she was survived by four nieces and five nephews. Several were children of her sister Mary Sharpe and her brother-in-law Zechariah Chafee Sr., including Henry S. Chafee of West Barrington; John S. Chafee of Providence, a tool manufacturer who was the father of future U.S. Senator John Chafee; and Dr. Francis H. Chafee of Providence. Other nephews included Henry D. Sharpe Jr. of Pojac Point, North Kingstown, and William Y. Peters of Tucson, Arizona. A sixth nephew, the Harvard legal scholar and civil libertarian Zechariah Chafee Jr., had predeceased her.

== See also ==
- Brown & Sharpe
- Clemence–Irons House
- Rhode Island School of Design
- John Carter Brown Library
- Jesse H. Metcalf
