= Helen Rowe Metcalf =

American founder and director of the Rhode Island School of Design

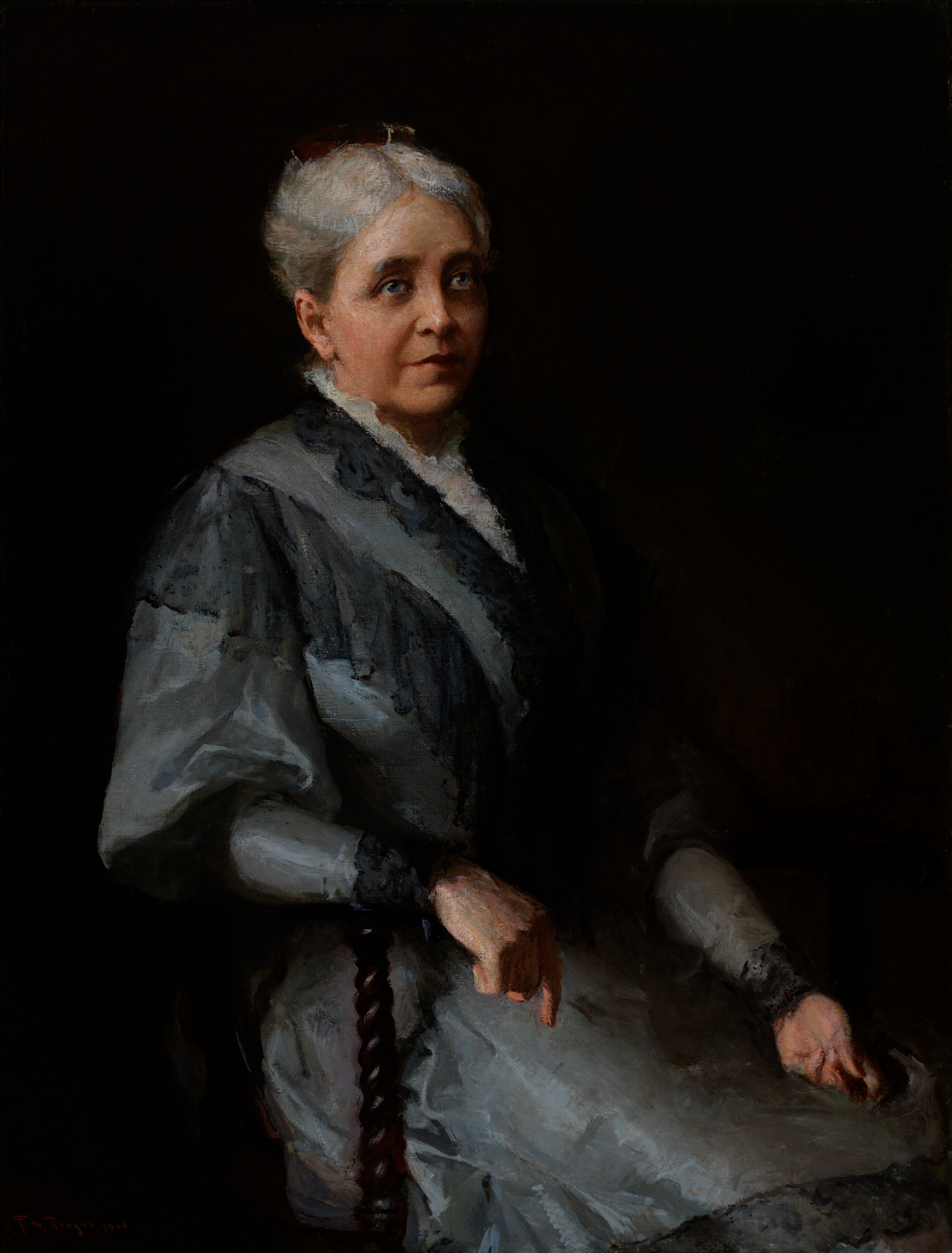
- Born: Helen Adelia Rowe; July 17, 1830; Providence, Rhode Island
- Died: March 1, 1895 (aged 64)
- Resting place: Swan Point Cemetery
- Spouse: Jesse Metcalf
- Children: 5, including Jesse H. Metcalf, Eliza Greene Metcalf Radeke
- Relatives: Helen Metcalf Danforth (granddaughter)

Helen Adelia Metcalf (née Rowe; July 17, 1830 – March 1, 1895) was a founder and director of the Rhode Island School of Design (RISD) in Providence, Rhode Island.

== Early life and personal life ==
Helen Adelia Rowe was born in Providence, Rhode Island on July 17, 1830. On November 22, 1852, she married Jesse Metcalf Sr. Jesse Metcalf was a cotton buyer in the South for several years prior to the Civil War, later becoming a textile manufacturer in Providence and co-founding the Wanskuck Company in 1862 in the Wanskuck area of Providence.

Metcalf taught at Sunday school and was an organist.

== Founding of RISD ==
Helen Metcalf helped to found RISD in 1877 after she and a group of Rhode Island women traveled to the 1876 Philadelphia Centennial Exposition celebration, the first worlds fair held in the United States. The Rhode Island Women's Centennial Commission, chaired by Helen Metcalf, consisted of 34 prominent Rhode Island women who were partially responsible for fundraising for Rhode Island’s state exhibit at the Exposition.

While at the fair the Commission visited the Women's Pavilion where the inventions of 75 women were displayed. Metcalf was particularly impressed by this display. When the Exposition ended the RI Commission had $1,675 in left over funds (about $43,000 in 2021 dollars). Upon returning to Rhode Island, Metcalf proposed "that this sum, augmented by a generous family donation, should go toward the establishment of a school for the training of designers for the “art industries” of the area, art teachers for the area's schools, and—because the Metcalfs were ardent collectors with a larger than merely pragmatic view as to what art education should be—for artists as well." An alternative option was to build a fountain in Roger Williams Park.

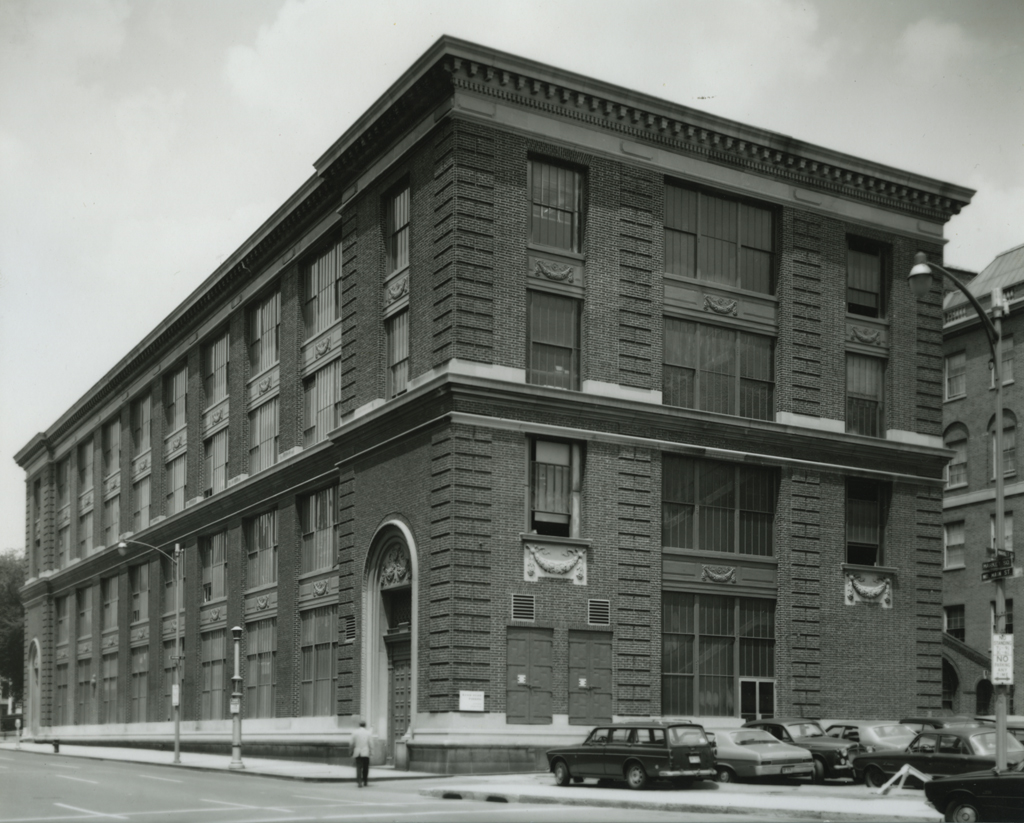
Original Metcalf building of the Rhode Island School of Design, 7-14 North Main Street, Providence; view of south-facing end of building from Market Square and North Main Street

At the time, Providence was a center for decorative arts and industry. Home of the Gorham Manufacturing Company, which produced silverwares, Providence also housed over 100 jewelry companies employing over 2500 workers by 1875, making the concept of a design school quite desirable. This enthusiasm for art, art education and the Aesthetic Movement was rampant across the nation at the time. Both the Metropolitan Museum of Art in New York City and the Museum of Fine Arts in Boston were established in 1870.

In 1873, the president of Brown University, Ezekiel Gilman Robinson, had written that "many intelligent citizens of our State are now desirous that a Scientific School of high order--a school that which, in addition to its more immediate aims shall not fail to provide also for sub-schools of Design, of Drawing, of Civil Engineering, of Architecture, of the Fine Arts--may speedily be established in Rhode Island."

RISD's first class was mostly composed of women, who received education in "useful arts, as, for example, designing for calico printers, for jewelers' designs, for carriage and furniture making." The first building built specifically for RISD, the Waterman Building was a gift of Jesse & Helen Metcalf.

Metcalf directed the school until her death in 1895. Her involvement was direct and hands-on, and she took a keen interest in everything from teaching methods of the faculty, encouraging the students in their work, arranging the furniture in the most effective ways, and driving school fundraising efforts. Today, RISD Alumni include many notable creators such as "designer Nicole Miller, New Yorker cartoonist Roz Chast, Family Guy creator Seth MacFarlane and three members of the Talking Heads".

== Death and legacy ==
She is buried at Swan Point Cemetery.

- Metcalf's son, U.S. Senator Jesse H. Metcalf, served as a RISD trustee.
- Metcalf's daughter, Eliza G. Radeke, served as president of the school after her mother's death.
- Metcalf's other son, Stephen Olney Metcalf, became the school's treasurer in 1884. His daughter Helen Metcalf Danforth served as President of the Corporation of RISD and as the Board of Trustees chair.

The Jesse + Helen Rowe Metcalf Society, an organization at RISD that recognizes "donors who have demonstrated their generosity and commitment to RISD by incorporating the college and/or museum into their estate plans" was named in their honor. She was inducted into the Rhode Island Heritage Hall of Fame in 1996.

== See also ==
- List of presidents of the Rhode Island School of Design
