= Eliza G. Radeke =

American college president (1854–1931)

7th President of the Rhode Island School of Design
- In office 1913–1931
- Preceded by: Isaac Comstock Bates
- Succeeded by: Helen Metcalf Danforth

Personal details
- Born: Eliza Greene Metcalf; December 11, 1854 Augusta, Georgia, U.S.
- Died: 1931
- Resting place: Swan Point Cemetery
- Spouse: Gustav Radeke (1880–1892; death)
- Relations: Jesse H. Metcalf (brother)
- Parent: Helen Adelia Rowe Metcalf (mother)
- Education: Vassar College, Brown University

Eliza Greene Radeke (née Metcalf; 1854–1931) was the president of the Rhode Island School of Design (RISD) in Providence, Rhode Island from 1913 to 1931 and was the daughter of RISD co-founder Helen Adelia Rowe Metcalf.

== Biography ==
Eliza Greene Metcalf was born in Augusta, Georgia on December 11, 1854 while her father, Jesse Metcalf was working as a cotton buyer. Her mother, Helen, was the co-founder of RISD in 1877. Her brother, Jesse H. Metcalf, was a U.S. Senator from Rhode Island. Eliza Metcalf attended Dr. Stockbridge's School in Providence and then received her A.B. from Vassar College in 1876. She later received an honorary A.M. from Brown University in 1914.

Eliza Metcalf married Dr. Gustav Radeke, M.D., of Providence on May 27, 1880. In 1913 several years after her mother's death, Eliza Radeke became President of the Rhode Island School of Design (RISD) and served on the Women's Advisory Committee of the Women's College at Brown University. She served as a director of the American Federation of Arts. She was a member of the Unitarian Church and pursued various outdoor activities.

Radeke was noted for her collection of Pennsylvania German pottery, begun in 1911; she was one of the first major collectors to focus on the field of American folk art.

== See also ==
- List of presidents of the Rhode Island School of Design
