= Roger Mandle =

American museum director, college president, and art historian (1941–2020)

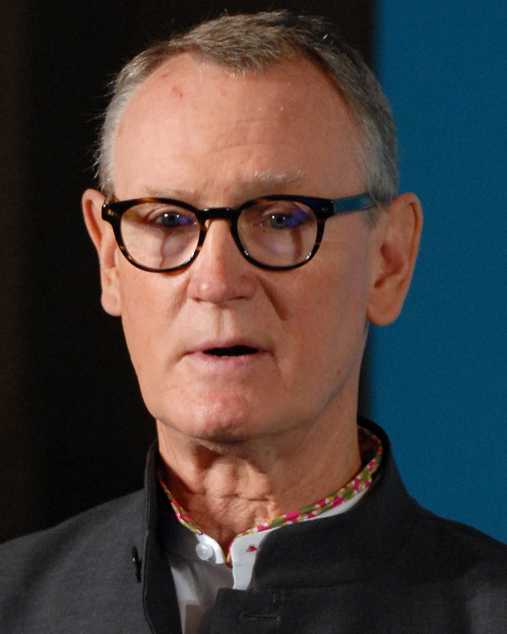
- Born: Earl Roger Mandle; May 13, 1941; Hackensack, New Jersey, United States
- Died: November 28, 2020 (aged 79); Dartmouth, Massachusetts, United States
- Other names: E. Roger Mandle
- Known for: art historian, curator, academic administrator
- Spouse: Gayle Wells Mandle
- Children: 2

Earl Roger Mandle (May 13, 1941 – November 28, 2020), better known as Roger Mandle, was an American museum administrator, curator, art historian, and college president. He was president of the Rhode Island School of Design from 1993 to 2008. He was director at Toledo Museum of Art (1977–1988), and deputy director and chief curator of National Gallery of Art (1988–1993).

== Early life and education ==
Earl Roger Mandle was born on May 13, 1941, in Hackensack, New Jersey, son of Earl Simmon Mandle (1913–1980), a graphic designer who went into the family meat business, and Phyllis Key (née Olberg) Mandle (1915–1995), who worked in apparel design. Mandle received a BA degree in 1963 from Williams College and MA degree and a certificate in Museum Training in 1967 from New York University. A specialist in the history of Dutch art, he earned a PhD in 2002 in art history from Case Western Reserve University. His 2001 dissertation was supervised by Walter Gibson and Catherine Scallen.

== Career ==
Mandle taught as instructor of art at Phillips Academy in Andover, Massachusetts 1963–1964, and at the McBurney School in New York, 1964–1965. He began his career in museum leadership as an associate director of the Minneapolis Institute of Art from 1967 to 1974, before becoming associate director at the Toledo Museum of Art from 1977 to 1976. He was director at Toledo from 1977 to 1988. From 1988 to 1993, as deputy director and chief curator of the National Gallery of Art in Washington, DC, Mandle was outspoken arts activist. While in Washington, Mandle sat on the National Education Goals Panel that prepared the National Standards for Arts Education, which would become part of the National Educational Goals (or Goals 2000). Presidents Ronald Reagan and George H. W. Bush appointed Mandle to the National Council on the Arts, one of many policy and advisory groups where he served.

=== Rhode Island School of Design ===
In 1993, Mandle was named president of the Rhode Island School of Design in Providence. During his tenure at RISD, Mandle oversaw the development of ambitious projects (such as the creation of a museum building by Rafael Moneo), and was recognized for increasing selectivity in the School's acceptance rates. He was also credited with initiating programs with nearby Brown University, including a dual-degree program to allow students to earn a B.F.A. and a B.A. from the respective institutions. In 2008, Mandle was succeeded by John Maeda. In May 2009, Mandle was awarded an honorary doctorate from the Rhode Island School of Design.

=== Qatar Museum Authority and late career ===
After leaving his post at RISD in July 2008, Mandle assumed the directorial position at the Qatar Museums Authority where he remained until 2012. He oversaw many museums in Qatar including the Museum of Islamic Art, the Qatar Natural History Museum and the National Museum of Qatar.

His work has helped develop the world's first non-profit, tuition-free, online academic institution that seeks to revolutionize higher education by making college-level studies accessible to students worldwide. He served on the boards of the American Association of Museums, the Williams College Museum of Art, the Clark Art Institute, and the Silk Road Project.

== Awards and honors ==
Mandle received honorary degrees from the University of Toledo (DFA, 1983), Kenyon College (DFA, 1986), Brown University (DFA, 2003), Maryland Institute College of Art, Bryant University (Doctor of Human Letters, 2011), Rhode Island School of Design (2009), and Virginia Commonwealth University (Doctor of Human Letters, 2009). He was made Knight of the Order of Isabel la Católica by King Juan Carlos of Spain in 1985, and was Fellow of the Royal Society of Arts.

== Death ==
Mandle died on November 28, 2020, in Dartmouth, Massachusetts, at age 79. He was survived by his wife, artist Gayle Wells Mandle, and two children, Julia Mandle and Luke Mandle
