= Helen Metcalf Danforth =

American college president (1887–1984)

8th President of the Rhode Island School of Design
- In office 1931–1947
- Preceded by: Eliza Greene Metcalf Radeke
- Succeeded by: Max W. Sullivan

Personal details
- Born: Helen Pierce Metcalf; September 3, 1887 Providence, Rhode Island, U.S.
- Died: October 18, 1984 (aged 97) Providence, Rhode Island, U.S.
- Resting place: Swan Point Cemetery
- Spouse: Murray Snell Danforth (m. 1916–1943; death)
- Relations: Helen Adelia Rowe Metcalf (grandmother), Eliza Greene Metcalf Radeke (aunt), Jesse H. Metcalf (uncle)
- Children: 3
- Education: St. Timothy's School

Helen Metcalf Danforth (1887–1984; née Helen Pierce Metcalf) was an American university president. From 1931 to 1947, she served as the President of Rhode Island School of Design (RISD).

== Early life ==
Helen Metcalf Danforth was born September 3, 1887, in Providence, Rhode Island, to parents Esther (née Pierce) and Stephen Olney Metcalf. Her paternal grandmother was Helen Rowe Metcalf, the founder of Rhode Island School of Design (RISD); her paternal aunt was Eliza G. Radeke, a former RISD president; and her paternal uncle was Jesse H. Metcalf, a United States Senator. Her father Stephen had worked as a treasurer at RISD.

She attended St. Timothy's School in Maryland. In 1916 she married Dr. Murray Snell Danforth, an orthopedic surgeon, together they had three children.

== Career ==
In 1931, Danforth was elected as the 8th President of Rhode Island School of Design, succeeding her aunt, Eliza G. Radeke. During her time as President, Danforth introduced the degree program (1932), and turned it into an accredited college program (1949). During her tenure the campus enlarged which included the addition of the Metcalf Building on College Street (1936), the Auditorium (1941), and the Metcalf Refectory, and the Waterman Street dormitories (1959). In 1947, she stepped down as President and became Chair of the Board of Trustees until her retirement in 1965.

Additionally, she was a collector of fine arts and a philanthropist.

Helen Metcalf Danforth died on October 18, 1984 in Providence. Her burial was in Swan Point Cemetery.

Danforth was elected to the Rhode Island Women's Heritage Hall of Fame in 1998.

== See also ==
- List of presidents of the Rhode Island School of Design
