= Jesse H. Metcalf =

American politician (1860–1942)

Jesse Houghton Metcalf
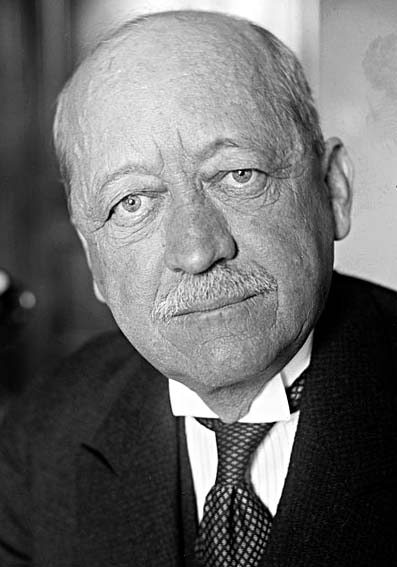

United States Senator from Rhode Island
- In office November 5, 1924 – January 3, 1937
- Preceded by: Lebaron B. Colt
- Succeeded by: Theodore F. Green

Member of the Rhode Island House of Representatives
- In office 1889–1891; 1907

Personal details
- Born: November 16, 1860 Providence, Rhode Island, U.S.
- Died: October 9, 1942 (aged 81) Providence, Rhode Island, U.S.
- Resting place: Swan Point Cemetery
- Party: Republican
- Spouse(s): Harriet Deshon Thurston (m. 1891), Louisa Dexter Sharpe (m. 1909)
- Relations: Helen Adelia Rowe Metcalf (mother), Eliza Greene Metcalf Radeke (sister), Helen Metcalf Danforth (niece)

Jesse Houghton Metcalf (November 16, 1860 – October 9, 1942) was an American politician who served as a United States senator from Rhode Island.

== Early life ==
Born in Providence, Metcalf was educated in private schools there, studied textile manufacturing in Yorkshire, England, and engaged in textile manufacturing. Metcalf's father, Jesse Metcalf, was a textile manufacturer, and his mother, Helen Adelia Rowe Metcalf, was the co-founder of the Rhode Island School of Design.

== Career ==
In 1889 Metcalf received a large bequest from his father's business partner, Henry J. Steere. Metcalf served as a member of the Rhode Island House of Representatives from 1889 to 1891 and in 1907, and was a member of the Providence Common Council from 1888 to 1892. He was chairman of the Metropolitan Park Commission of Rhode Island from 1909 to 1924, and a member of the penal and charitable board from 1917 to 1923.

In addition, he was president of Rhode Island Hospital, a trustee of the Rhode Island School of Design at Providence and of Brown University, and from 1935 to 1940 a Republican National Committeeman. He was also a part owner of The Providence Journal.

Metcalf was elected as a Republican to the United States Senate on November 4, 1924, to fill the vacancy caused by the death of LeBaron B. Colt; on the same day he was also elected for the term commencing March 4, 1925. He was reelected in 1930 and served from November 5, 1924, to January 3, 1937; he was an unsuccessful candidate for reelection in 1936. He is the last Republican to date to hold Rhode Island's Class 2 Senate seat.

In 1930 he was elected as a Compatriot of the Rhode Island Society of the Sons of the American Revolution.

While in the Senate he was chairman of the Committee on Patents (Sixty-ninth and Seventieth Congresses) and a member of the Committee on Education and Labor (Seventy-first and Seventy-second Congresses).

== Death and legacy ==
He died in Providence in 1942; interment was in Swan Point Cemetery. The Jesse H. Metcalf Lodge at Camp Yawgoog, the funds for which were donated by his wife, houses the Camp Sandy Beach dining hall and was named in his honor. Metcalf's sister, Eliza G. Radeke, served as president of the Rhode Island School of Design from 1913 to 1931.

In the early 1920s, the logging of ancient Redwood Forests in Northern California nearly extinguished a primordial coastal redwoods (Sequoia sempervirens). A last ditch conservation effort to preserve a grove of these trees was undertaken following publication of a series of photographs showing the size of these ancient trees.

Within Jedediah Smith Redwoods State Park, within the Redwoods National Park, there is a plaque that reads the following: "The Metcalf Grove This Grove is Given to the State of California for the Preservation of these Ancient Trees by Mr. And Mrs. Jesse M. Metcalf of Rhode Island" Location: 41.765485, -124.129551

Party political offices
Preceded by LeBaron Bradford Colt	Republican nominee for U.S. Senator from Rhode Island (Class 2); 1924, 1930, 1936	Succeeded by Ira Lloyd Letts
U.S. Senate
Preceded by LeBaron B. Colt	U.S. senator (Class 2) from Rhode Island; 1924 – 1937; Served alongside: Peter G. Gerry, Felix Hebert, Peter G. Gerry	Succeeded by Theodore F. Green
