= Swan Point Cemetery =

Historic cemetery in Providence County, Rhode Island, US

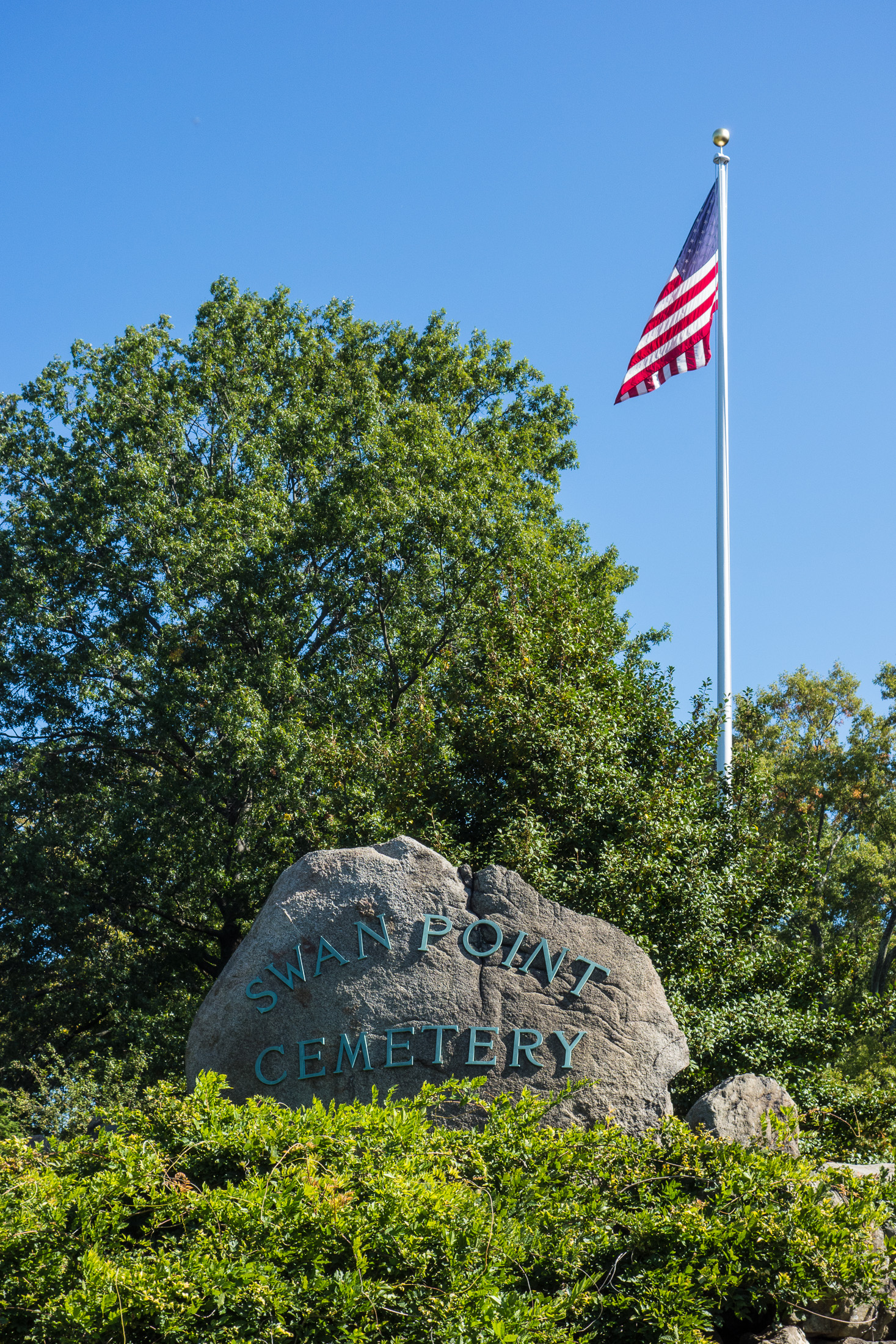
- Entrance sign for Swan Point Cemetery
- Interactive map of Swan Point Cemetery

Details
- Established: 1846
- Location: 585 Blackstone Boulevard, East Side, Providence, Rhode Island
- Country: United States
- Type: Rural cemetery
- Size: 200 acres (81 ha)
- Website: Cemetery website
- Swan Point Cemetery
- U.S. National Register of Historic Places
- Location within Rhode Island
- Location: Providence, Rhode Island
- Coordinates: 41°51′10″N 71°22′58″W
- Built: 1846
- Architects: Multiple, including H. W. S. Cleveland
- NRHP reference No.: 77000007 (original); 78003445 (increase)
- Added to NRHP: October 5, 1977

Swan Point Cemetery is a historic rural cemetery located in Providence, Rhode Island, United States. Established in 1846 on a 60-acre (0.24 km^{2}) plot of land, it has approximately 40,000 interments.

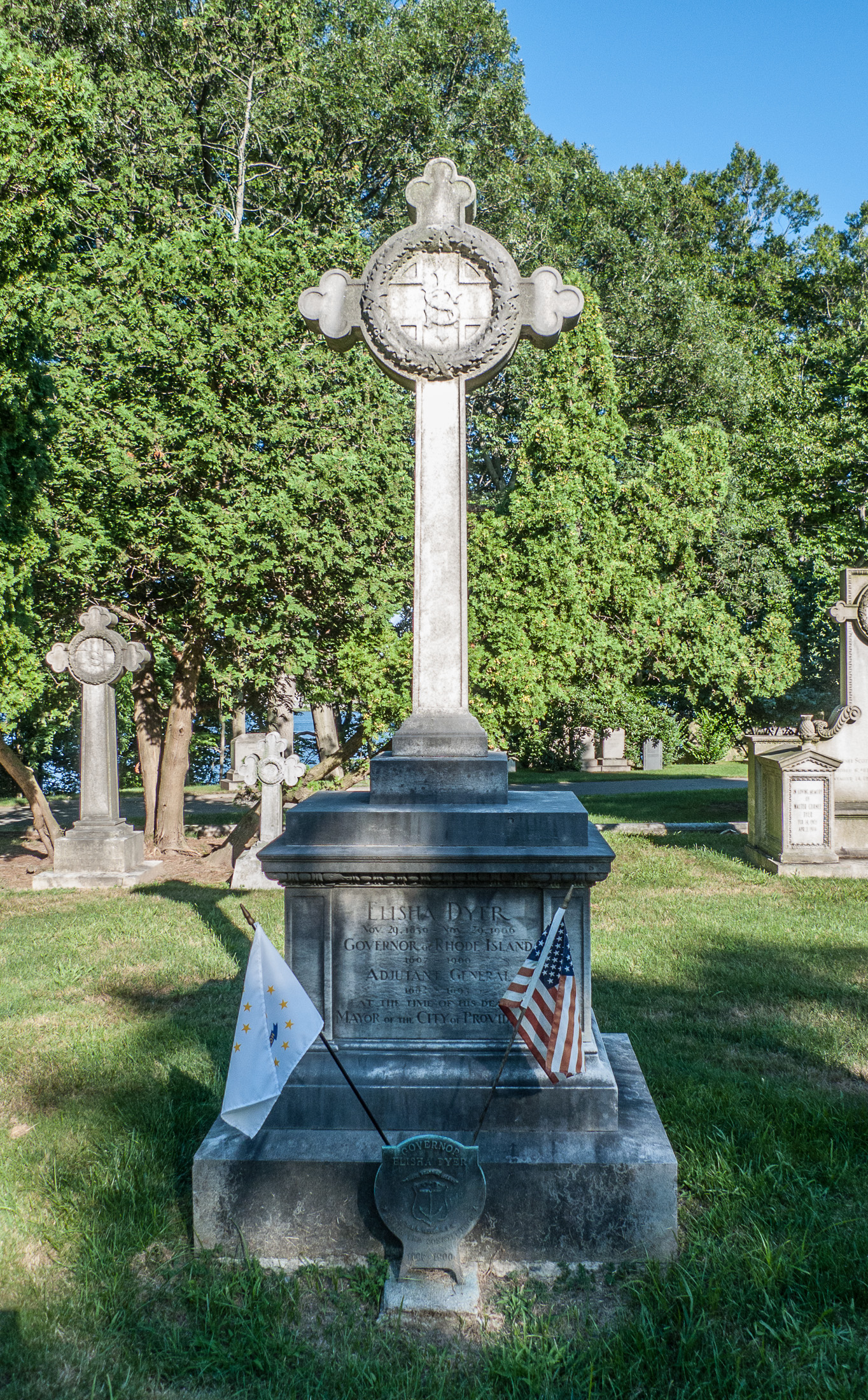
Grave of Rhode Island Governor Elisha Dyer Jr.

== History ==
The cemetery was first organized under the Swan Point Cemetery Company, with a board of trustees. In 1858, a new charter was developed to make the cemetery administration non-profit, and it was taken over by a group known as the Proprietors of Swan Point Cemetery. In 1886, landscape architect H. W. S. Cleveland was hired to redesign the area. It is a cemetery park with its design inspired by the landscape of the first rural garden cemetery in the United States, Mount Auburn Cemetery in Cambridge, Massachusetts.

Among the first to make use of a tract of land within the cemetery was the First Congregational Society (now First Unitarian Society). They moved several interments from older plots in Providence to Swan Point. Over the years additional land acquisition has expanded the cemetery to 200 acres (0.81 km^{2}), and is still open to new interments today.

The Swan Point Cemetery is widely considered to be the most prominent cemetery in Rhode Island due to the number of well known citizens of the state buried there. There are more governors, senators and congressmen buried there than any other cemetery in Rhode Island.

Swan Point Cemetery was listed on the National Register of Historic Places in 1977. It is one of the two largest cemeteries in Providence with the other one being the North Burial Ground.

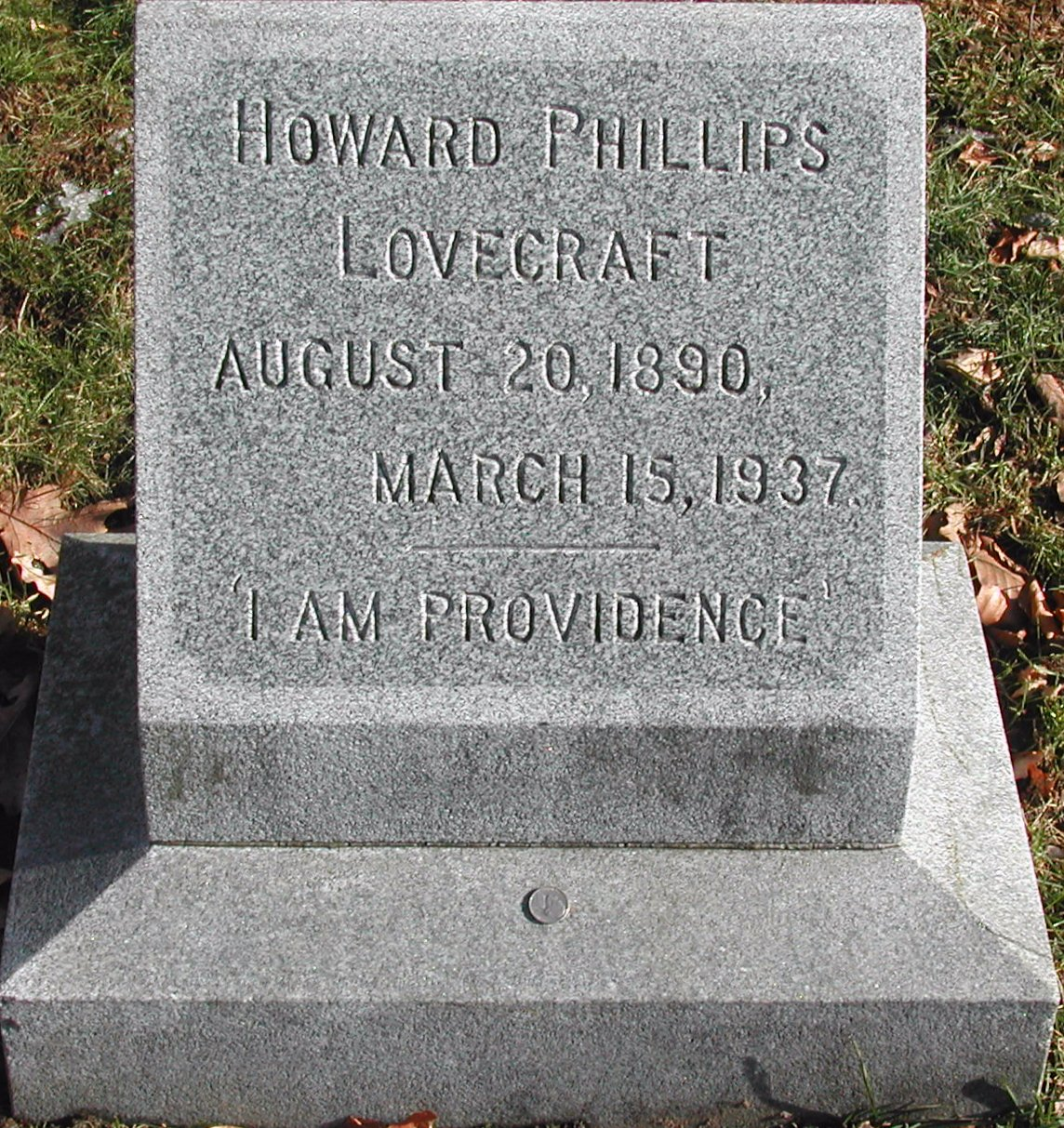
Gravestone of H. P. Lovecraft

== Notable interments ==
Swan Point has the burials of many notable Rhode Island figures:

- Rachel Blodgett Adams, 1921 Ph.D., mathematician
- David Aldrich, American artist
- Nelson W. Aldrich, U.S. Congressman, U.S. Senator, grandfather of Vice President Nelson Rockefeller
- Richard Steere Aldrich, U.S. Congressman, son of Nelson W. Aldrich
- Henry B. Anthony, Governor of Rhode Island, and President pro tempore of the U.S. Senate
- Lemuel H. Arnold, U.S. Congressman, Governor of Rhode Island
- Richard Arnold, Union army general
- Sullivan Ballou, state politician, Civil War officer killed in action at the Battle of Bull Run, whose love letter to his wife was featured in Ken Burns's The Civil War
- David L. Barnes, U.S. District judge, litigant in West v. Barnes
- Bathsheba A. Benedict, (1809–1897), abolitionist and philanthropist, and benefactor of Benedict College
- Lester D. Boronda (1886–1953), painter, furniture designer, sculptor
- Augustus Osborn Bourn (1834–1925), businessman and politician, Governor of Rhode Island 1883–1885
- Charles R. Brayton, Civil War officer, postmaster of Providence, and long time Republican political boss
- Emeline S. Burlingame, editor and suffragist
- Ambrose Burnside, Major General in the Civil War, Governor of Rhode Island and U.S. Senator
- Adin Ballou Capron, U.S. Congressman
- Elizabeth Buffum Chace (1806–1899), slavery abolitionist, women's suffrage
- Malcolm Greene Chace (1875–1955), industrialist, hockey innovator, and amateur tennis player
- George Coby (1883 - 1967), Georgian/American industrialist, chemist and philanthropist. Inventor of first electrical Christmas tree lights, waterproof concrete and construction grade glass bricks.
- George Henry Corliss, inventor of the Corliss steam engine
- Helen Metcalf Danforth (1887–1984) university president.
- Jane Anthony Davis, American painter
- Thomas Davis, U.S. Congressman
- Thomas Wilson Dorr, Political reformer, revolutionary and Governor of Rhode Island
- Sarah Elizabeth Doyle, Educator and reformer.
- Thomas Arthur Doyle, long-serving mayor of Providence
- Elisha Dyer, Governor of Rhode Island
- Elisha Dyer Jr., Governor of Rhode Island, Mayor of Providence
- Benjamin Tucker Eames, U.S. Congressman
- C. M. Eddy Jr., author
- Theodore Foster, U.S. Senator
- Albert Gallup, U.S. Congressman
- Lucius F. C. Garvin, Governor of Rhode Island
- Darius Goff, Pawtucket businessman and textile mill owner.
- Daniel L. D. Granger, U.S. Congressman
- Theodore F. Green, Governor of Rhode Island and U.S. Senator
- William S. Hayward, Mayor of Providence
- Robert Henri, American painter and teacher
- William Warner Hoppin, Governor of Rhode Island
- Charles Tillinghast James, U.S. Senator
- Thomas Allen Jenckes, U.S. Congressman
- William Jones, Governor of Rhode Island
- Herbert W. Ladd, Governor of Rhode Island
- Benedict Lapham, industrialist, philanthropist
- Oscar Lapham, U.S. Congressman
- Charles W. Lippitt, Governor of Rhode Island
- Frederick Lippitt, Philanthropist
- Henry Lippitt, Governor of Rhode Island
- Henry Frederick Lippitt, U.S. Senator
- Alfred Henry Littlefield, Governor of Rhode Island
- H. P. Lovecraft, American author
- Helen Adelia Rowe Metcalf (1830–1895), founder and director of a university.
- Jesse Houghton Metcalf, U.S. Senator
- Seth Padelford, Governor of Rhode Island
- Charles H. Page, U.S. Congressman
- Vahram Papazyan, Olympic runner
- Whipple Van Buren Phillips, businessman
- Eliza Greene Metcalf Radeke (1854–1931), university president.
- D.W. Reeves (1838–1900), bandleader known as "father of band music in America"
- Elisha Hunt Rhodes, Union Civil War veteran featured prominently in Ken Burns's The Civil War
- Horatio Rogers Jr., Attorney General of Rhode Island and Rhode Island Supreme Court Justice
- James Y. Smith, Mayor of Providence and Governor of Rhode Island
- William Sprague III, Governor of Rhode Island and U.S. Senator
- William Sprague IV, Governor of Rhode Island and U.S. Senator
- Margaret Bingham Stillwell, bibliographer and librarian
- Alfred Stone, Providence architect
- Royal C. Taft, Governor of Rhode Island
- George William Whitaker (1840–1916), the "Dean of Providence Painters"
- Henry Clarke Wright, (1797-1870), preacher, writer and abolitionist.

== See also ==
- National Register of Historic Places listings in Providence, Rhode Island
- List of cemeteries in Rhode Island
