= Hope Block and Cheapside =

- U.S. National Register of Historic Places
- U.S. National Historic Landmark District – Contributing property
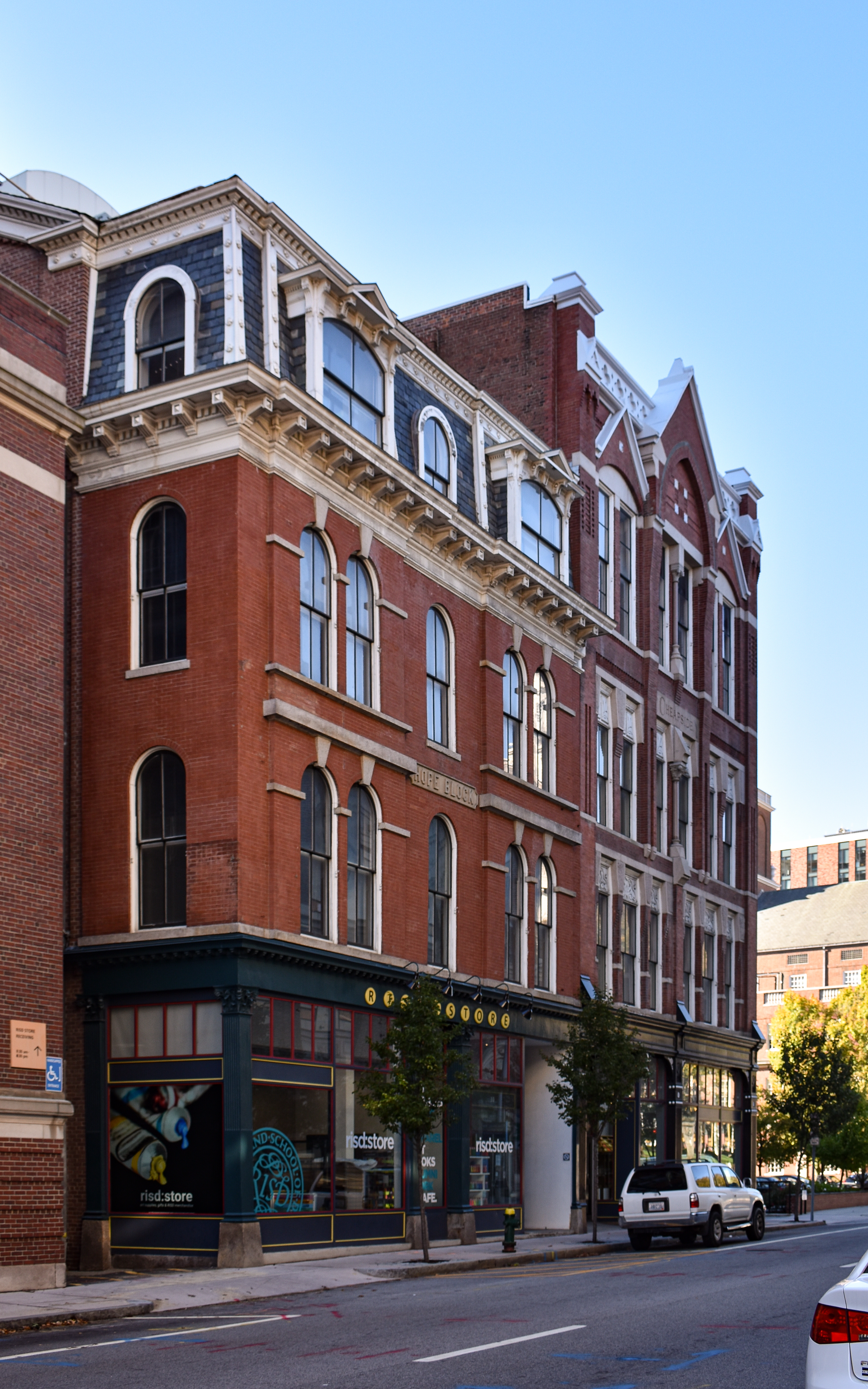
- Hope Block (left) and Cheapside Block (right)

- Location within Rhode Island
- Location: North Main Street, Providence, Rhode Island
- Coordinates: 41°49′35″N 71°24′33″W
- Built: 1869; 1880
- Architect: Clifton A. Hall; Stone & Carpenter
- Architectural style: Second Empire, Gothic
- Part of: College Hill Historic District (ID70000019)
- NRHP reference No.: 75000059

Significant dates
- Added to NRHP: May 21, 1975
- Designated NHLDCP: November 10, 1970

Hope Block and Cheapside are two historic commercial buildings located at 22-26 and 40 North Main Street in the College Hill neighborhood of Providence, Rhode Island. The Hope Block (22-26 North Main) was built in 1869 in the Second Empire style. It was probably designed by Clifton A. Hall, who designed a nearly identical building (the Curry and Richards Building) the year before. The Cheapside Block (40 North Main) was built in 1880 and designed by architects Stone & Carpenter. They are the only two buildings to survive from the 1860s-70s development of the "Cheapside" area of Providence, north of the site of its colonial marketplace.

Both buildings were added to the National Register of Historic Places in 1975, and were restored during the 1980s as part of the Rhode Island School of Design. The RISD Store is located in the Hope Block, while the RISD Design Center occupies the Cheapside Block.

== See also ==
- National Register of Historic Places listings in Providence, Rhode Island
