= John Maeda =

American designer (born 1966)

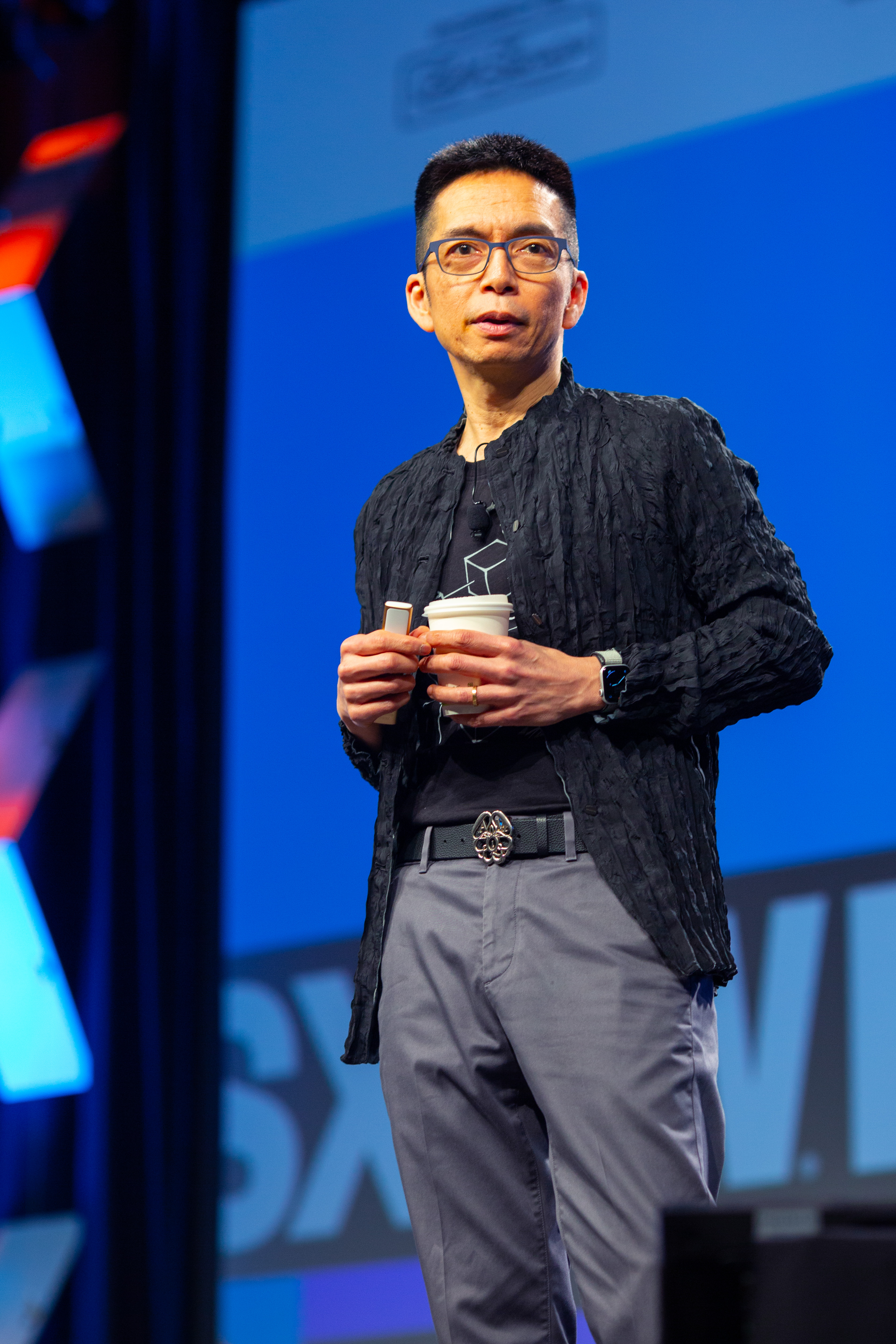
- Maeda at SXSW 2024

16th President of the Rhode Island School of Design
- In office June 2008 – December 2013

Personal details
- Born: 1966 (age 59–60) Seattle, Washington, US
- Education: Massachusetts Institute of Technology (BA, MA), Arizona State University (MBA), Tsukuba University (PhD)
- Profession: Designer, corporate executive, strategic advisor, educator, academic administrator, visual artist, writer

John Maeda (born 1966) is an American designer, visual artist, executive, strategic advisor, writer, and educator. He serves as the vice president of design and artificial intelligence at Microsoft. Previously, Maeda served as chief technology officer of Everbridge from October 2020 through October 2022, and as president of Rhode Island School of Design (RISD) from June 2008 until December 2013. Before that he was a research professor at the MIT Media Lab leading advancements in computational design, low-code/no-code, and creative commerce.

== Early life and education ==
John Maeda was born in 1966 in Seattle, Washington, where his father owned a tofu factory. Maeda studied computer science at the Massachusetts Institute of Technology, where he became fascinated with the work of Paul Rand and Muriel Cooper. Cooper was a director of MIT's Visible Language Workshop. After completing his bachelor's and master's degrees at MIT, Maeda completed his PhD in design at Tsukuba University's Institute of Art and Design in Japan. He also has an MBA from Arizona State University.

== Career ==
=== Corporate executive and strategic advisor ===
He is formerly executive vice president, chief experience officer at Publicis Sapient where he developed the LEAD (Light, Ethical, Accessible, Dataful) doctrine for technology products and services. Prior to that he was Global Head, Computational Design and Inclusion at Automattic where he sought to address the diversity gap in tech by exploring how inclusion could be a key ingredient for success in the technology industry.

Before that he was Design Partner at Kleiner Perkins Caufield & Byers (KPCB) where he advised startups on the business impact of design and continues as a strategic advisor. He also served on the Board of Directors of consumer electronics company Sonos and global advertising firm Wieden+Kennedy.

From 2019 until 2020, he was an executive vice president and chief experience officer at Publicis Sapient where he helped businesses bridge strategy and engineering with computational design.

=== Educator and academic administrator ===
He was a professor at the MIT Media Lab for 12 years where he fostered a community of designers who could code and engineers who could design called the Aesthetics + Computation Group, and then created the Physical Language Workshop with Henry Holtzman. Shortly after the launch of the Design By Numbers project to teach artists and designers how to code, he helped to accelerate the Scratch language project in an NSF proposal with outreach across the digital divide.

He resigned from MIT in 2008 to become the president of the Rhode Island School of Design (RISD) during the 2008 financial crisis.

=== President of Rhode Island School of Design ===
In 2011, RISD's faculty majority passed a vote of no confidence in Maeda. He survived the vote, and subsequently led RISD to be recognized by the business community as number one in the world while shepherding the national STEAM movement, feeling that "art and design are poised to transform our economy in the 21st century like science and technology did in the last century." For his work in advancing STEAM education, Maeda was recognized with a Tribeca Film Festival Disruptor Award and the Nancy Hanks Lecture on Arts & Public Policy at the John F. Kennedy Center. Maeda resigned from his RISD presidency at the end of 2013 and joined KPCB. Around the same time he also joined eBay's Design Advisory Board as chairman.

=== Visual art and other work ===
In 2014 and 2015, he guest curated and hosted PopTech: REBELLION, and PopTech: HYBRID.

In 2015 he published his first Design In Tech Report to connect the investing world with the world of design and technology. A 2nd Design in Tech Report was published in 2016 and later in 2017, a 3rd Design In Tech Report was published.

Maeada's artwork is in the collections of the Museum of Modern Art in New York City; the San Francisco Museum of Modern Art; and the Cartier Foundation in Paris.

== Awards and honors ==
In 1999, he was named one of the 21 most important people in the 21st century by Esquire. In 2001, he received the National Design Award for Communication Design in the United States and Japan's Mainichi Design Prize.

He received the 2005 Lucky Strike Designer Award from the Raymond Loewy Foundation. In 2009, he was inducted into the New York Art Director’s Club Hall of Fame, and he received the AIGA Medal in 2010. He is a trustee of the Cooper–Hewitt, National Design Museum.

Honorary doctorates awarded by City University of Hong Kong (2022), Drexel University (2017), Simon Fraser University (2014), Maryland Institute College of Arts (2003).

== Personal life ==
Maeda is married to Kris Maeda, and together they have five daughters. Kris and John Maeda worked together on the design consultancy, MAEDASTUDIO.

== Bibliography ==
- Maeda, John (1995). Reactive Square (Artists' book). Digitalogue Company Limited.
- Maeda, John (1996). Flying Letters. Digitalogue Co. Ltd. ISBN 9784924999299.
- Maeda, John (1997). 12 O'clocks. Digitalogue Co. Ltd. ISBN 9784924999497.
- Maeda, John (1999). Design By Numbers (1st ed.). MIT Press. ISBN 9780262133548.
- Maeda, John (2000). Maeda @ Media (1st ed.). Thames and Hudson. ISBN 9780500282359.
- Maeda, John (2004). Creative Code: Aesthetics + Computation. Thames & Hudson. ISBN 9780500285176.
- Maeda, John (2006). The Laws of Simplicity. MIT Press. ISBN 9780262260954.
- Maeda, John; Bermont, Rebecca J. (April 2011). Redesigning Leadership (Simplicity: Design, Technology, Business, Life). MIT Press. ISBN 9780262015882.
- Hall, Erika; Maeda, John (2018). Conversational Design. A Book Apart. ISBN 9781937557546.
- Maeda, John (2019). How To Speak Machine: Computational Thinking For The Rest Of Us. Penguin Books Limited. ISBN 9780241976616.

== See also ==
- Software art
- Internet art
- List of presidents of the Rhode Island School of Design
