= Joseph H. Davis (painter) =

American painter

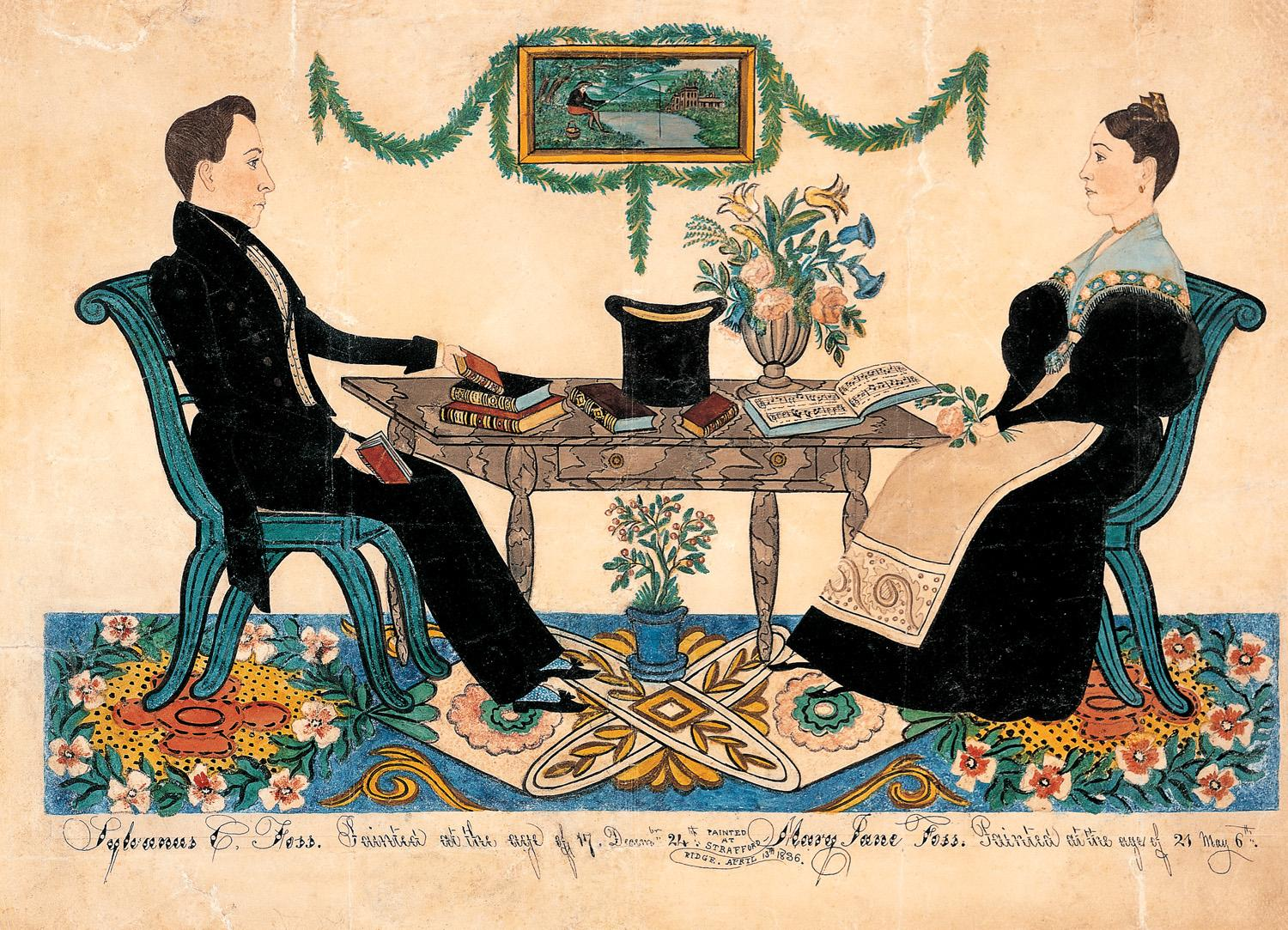
Portrait of Sylvanus C. Foss and Mary Jane Foss, 1836, watercolor, pencil, and ink on paper, in the collection of the American Folk Art Museum

Joseph H. Davis (active 1832–1837; died May 25, 1865) was an itinerant American portrait painter. Over a period of only five years, from 1832 to 1837, he painted about 150 watercolor portraits of residents of Maine and New Hampshire. The body of work he left behind is highly regarded for its calligraphic line, miniaturizing delicacy, and decorative stylization. His pictures are in many important collections, including those of the American Folk Art Museum, the Metropolitan Museum of Art, the Museum of Fine Arts, Boston, the National Gallery of Art, the Terra Foundation for American Art and the Strawbery Banke museum in Portsmouth, New Hampshire.

Davis died on May 25, 1865, aged 53, in Woburn, Massachusetts.

== Life and work ==
=== Personal life ===
Little is known about the artist's life. However, Davis's signature on his early portraits, many including "Left-handed painter" after his name, helps to demystify some of the anonymity about the painter and his work. The portrait of Bartholomew Van Dame is inscribed "Left Hand / Painter," which is taken as a confirmation that the artist was left-handed. The 1926 donation of a signed portrait by an individual donor to the New Hampshire Historical Society led to speculation as to whether he was the Joseph H. Davis of Farmington or Dover, or if he was from Maine instead. Although his identity remained uncertain for almost another half century, his work was featured in a major exhibition in 1974 at the Art Institute of Chicago.

His identity was only securely established in 1989. Historians have been able to reconstruct his movements during his brief career as an itinerant artist because of the calligraphic inscriptions Davis would include at the foot of his pictures, usually giving the name and age of his sitters. The sitters are then cross-referenced through external sources, establishing their (and the artist's) location at the time of the painting. In this way, Art Historians Arthur and Sybil Kern connected the artist as a local farmer known as "Pine Hill Joe" of Limington, Maine.

These primary sources also postulate that Davis was probably born on August 10, 1811, in Limington, Maine to land trader Joseph Davis and his wife, Phebe. In addition to farming and land speculating, the elder Davis also worked as a manufacturer and inventor. He lived in several towns in the Northeast, including Saco, Vassalboro, and Newfield, Maine; Morristown, New Jersey; and Wilmington, Massachusetts. He died on May 25, 1865, at the age of fifty-three, in Woburn, Massachusetts.

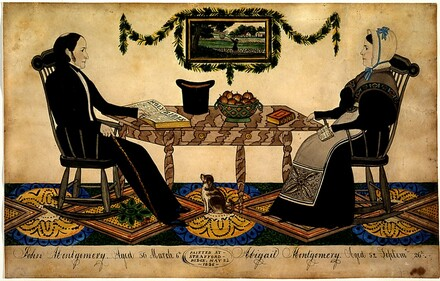
John and Abigail Montgomery, 1836, watercolor, pencil, ink on paper. In the collection of the National Gallery of Art.

The article by Arthur and Sybil Kern that established Davis's identity also posited his connection with the Freewill Baptist Church. This church provided the network that connected Davis with many of his clients, and Davis includes the church's publications, The Morning Star, as an attribute in many of his portraits.

Davis married in 1835 and moved to Saco, Maine, but he remained active as an artist until about 1838. He may have ceased painting at that date because the birth of his daughter necessitated a more secure income. Thereafter, he was occupied in land speculation, manufacturing, and inventing. Initially unheard of outside the region in which he worked, Davis was “rediscovered” by American folk art collectors a century later; today, his works are highly prized.

=== Artistry ===
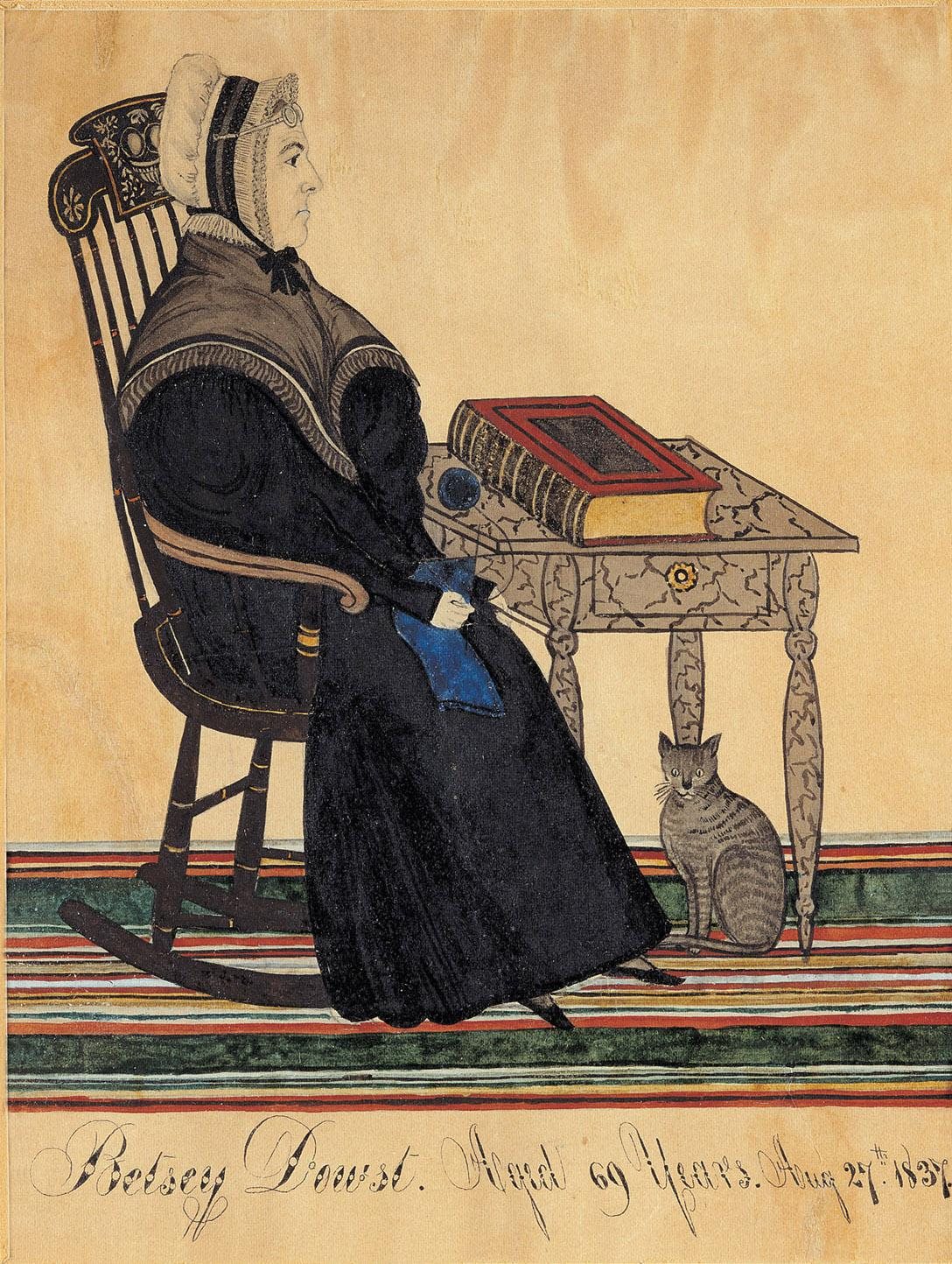
Betsey Dowst, 1837, watercolor, pencil, and ink on paper, in the collection of the American Folk Art Museum. Individuals are often displayed alongside prized possessions such as books and pets.

Art historians have been able to reconstruct his movements during his brief career as an itinerant artist because of the calligraphic inscriptions Davis would include at the foot of his pictures, usually giving the name and age of his sitters. The sitters are then cross-referenced through external sources, establishing their (and the artist’s) location at the time of the painting.

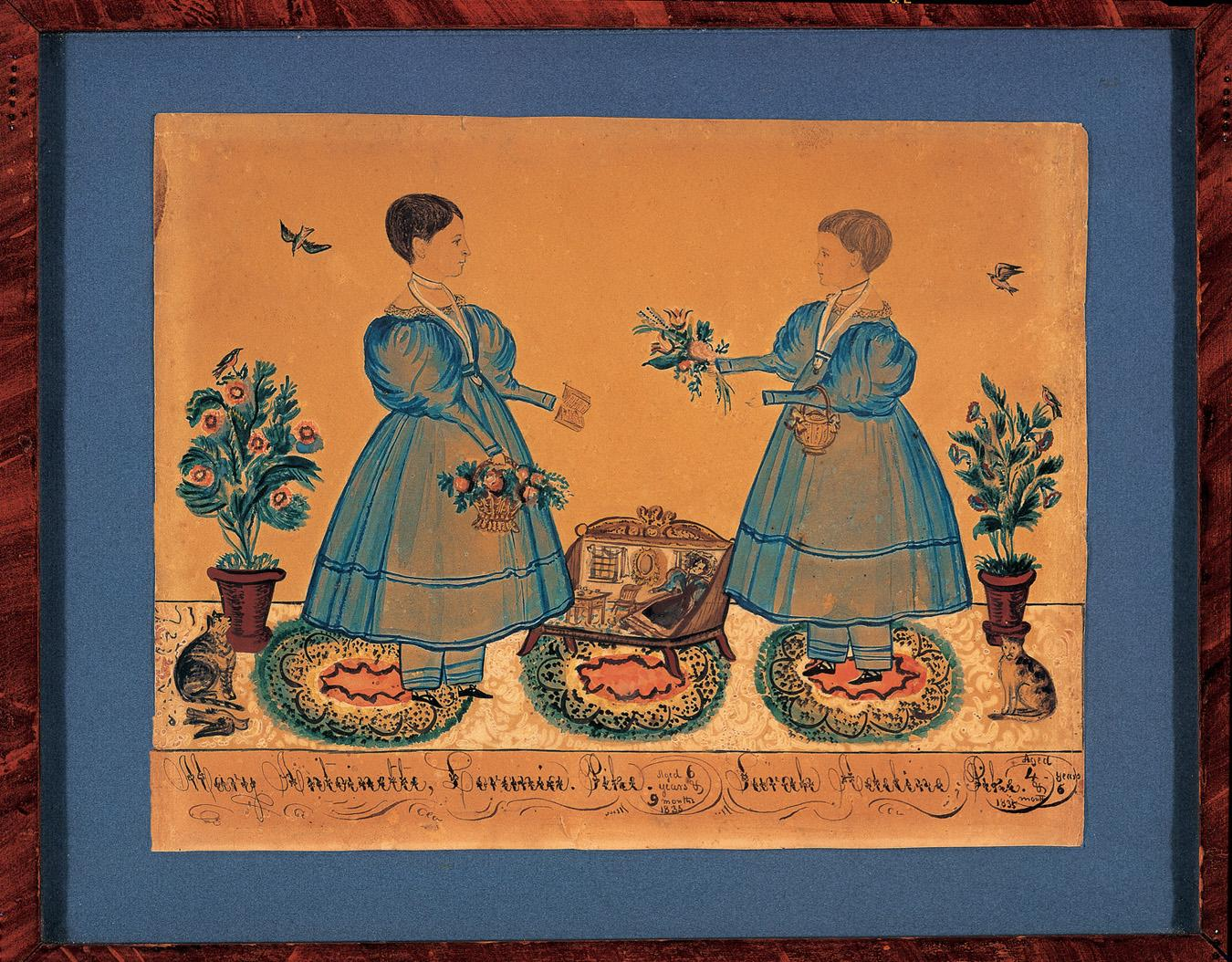
Mary Antoinette Lorania Pike and Sarah Adeline Pike, 1865, watercolor, pencil, and ink on paper, in the collection of the American Folk Art Museum. An example of the geometrically patterned carpets that help to characterize this artist’s work.

Davis's art has a highly consistent character. He painted portraits in watercolor, with the faces of his sitters depicted in strict profile while their bodies usually open outward to a three-quarter view. As early as 1832, he specialized in recording subjects in interior settings typical of a nineteenth-century rural New England home.

A burgeoning manufacture economy and flourishing middle class contributed to both Davis’s success as an itinerant painter and the quality of goods portrayed in his works. The objects portrayed (e.g. musical instruments, inkwells, books, etc.) are used to characterize the subject’s personalities, suggesting their professions and displaying their life styles.

Practical floor covering was replaced by the painted floor cloth, a heavy sailcloth stiffened with starch and decorated with bold geometric repeat patterns; sometimes the floors themselves were painted freehand in similar fashion." Other examples of period-specific furnishing portrayed in Davis’s paintings are the neoclassical Klismos Chair (as seen in the Portrait of Sylvanus C. Foss and Mary Jane Foss, 1836), the banjo clock, and paintings of the family homestead.

He is best known "for his double portraits of married couples facing each other across a table". His work can also be characterized by the painting of multiple members of a single family, either in groups or individually, demonstrating that his reputation spread by word of mouth among the closely tied families of the rural municipalities in which he traveled.

Another distinguishing feature of Davis’s work are the calligraphic ink inscriptions at the bottom of his watercolor portraits. This included their names, year, and the town where they resided. The artist often signed his name to the composition, annotating it with a personal description of himself as a “LEFT HAND / PAINTER.”

== Sources ==
- Kern, Arthur and Sybil. "Joseph H. Davis: Identity Established," The Clarion 14, no. 3 (Summer 1989), pp. 45–53.
- Stacy C. Hollander (ed.) et al., American Radiance: The Ralph Esmerian Gift to the American Folk Art Museum, New York: The American Folk Art Museum in association with Harry N. Abrams, 2001, pp. 392–397.
- Wertkin, Gerard C. (ed.). Encyclopedia of American Folk Art. New York: Routledge, 2004, pp. 144–145.
