= Pippin Frisbie-Calder =

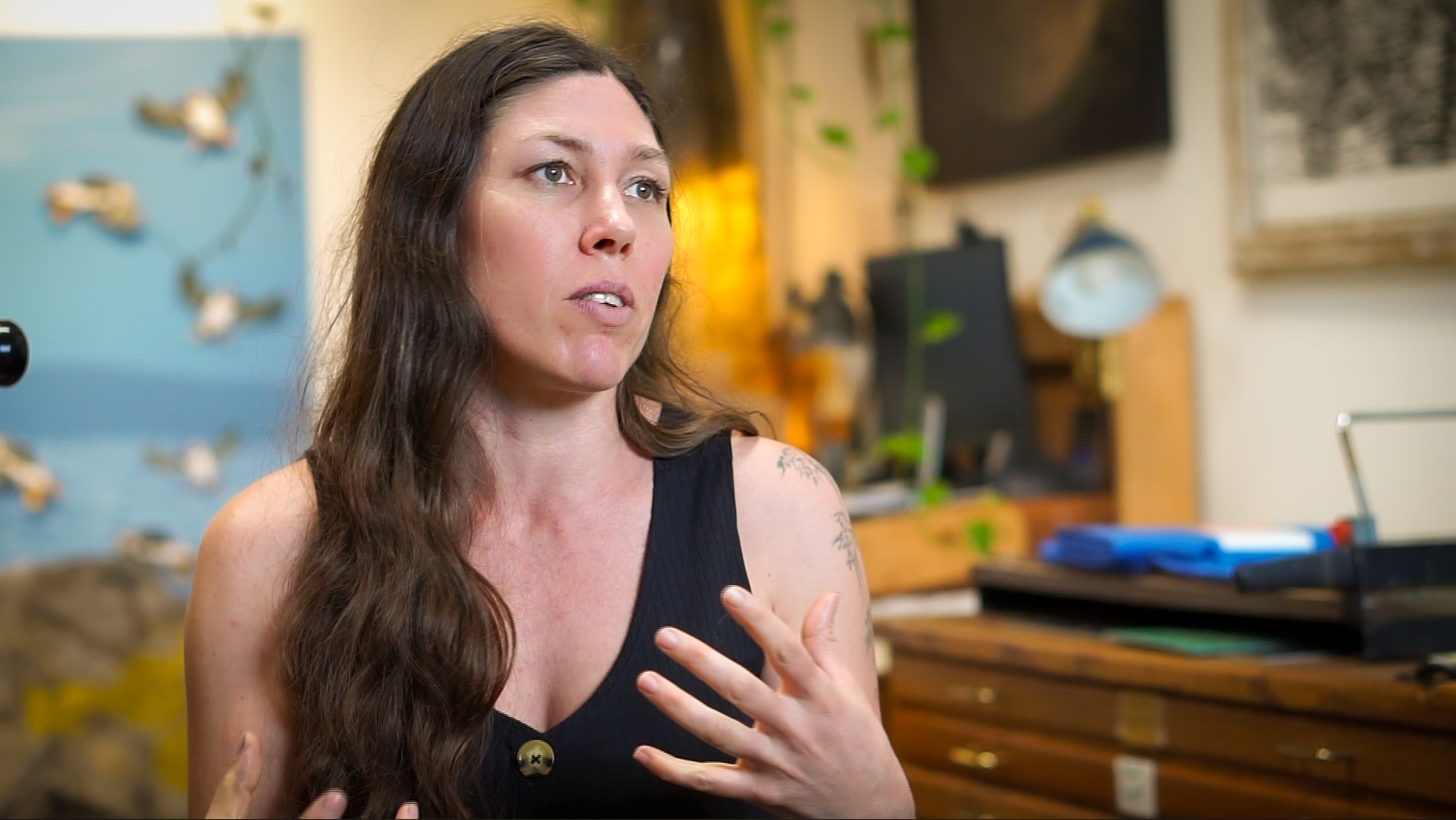
- Pippin Frisbie-Calder (2024)
- Born: 1985 (age 40–41); Hammond, Louisiana, U.S.
- Education: Rhode Island School of Design (BFA), Tulane University (MFA)
- Known for: Visual arts, printmaking
- Movement: Climate change art, Ecological art, Environmental art
- Website: https://www.pippinfrisbiecalder.com/

Pippin Frisbie-Calder (born December 14, 1985) is an American visual artist, lecturer, and printmaker whose work addresses climate change and environmental degradation through the lens of bioindicators, often birds. By focusing on species that signal the health of ecosystems, her art explores the broader impacts of environmental issues like species extinction and trophic cascades. Through collaborations with microbiologists, ornithologists, and ecologists, she creates large-scale visual installations that demystify scientific outcomes related to climate science and environmental stewardship. Her immersive installations, often created in partnership with climate and environmental organizations, incorporate layered woodcut prints and interactive art, garnering attention for bridging art and science to raise ecological awareness.

== Early life and education ==
Pippin Frisbie-Calder was born in Hammond, Louisiana, and spent her childhood between Maine and home-schooling on a boat her parents built (‘Nada’), sailing from Mandeville in Louisiana, through Central America and the Caribbean with her family. Frisbie-Calder's mother, Terrie Frisbie, is also a printmaker, and in addition to homeschooling her at sea, put carving tools in her hands before she was five years old. Her father, Nigel Calder, is a leading authority on sailing and yachting systems and has authored several publications, including works published by McGraw-Hill Professional. He is best known for his book “Boatowner’s Mechanical and Electrical Manual”.

In 1995, Nada was granted a permit to circumnavigate Cuba in order to conduct survey work and create charts for a navigational guide of the island. Frisbie-Calder's family spent eight months exploring every navigable bay around the island, resulting in the authoring of the leading cruising guide to Cuba, Cuba, a Cruising Guide, written by Nigel Calder. The family also spent time in Europe due to Nigel Calder's English roots.

Frisbie-Calder's academic pursuits began with a focus on printmaking at the esteemed Rhode Island School of Design, culminating in her graduation with Honors with a BFA. Subsequently, Frisbie-Calder moved to New Orleans to help run the New Orleans Community Printshop. She continued her education, pursuing printmaking at Tulane University located in New Orleans, Louisiana, and successfully obtained a Master of Fine Arts degree. Additionally, Frisbie-Calder later served at Tulane University in both the Newcomb Art Department and the Environmental Biology Department. Prior to her MFA at Tulane, Frisbie-Calder was already established as an acclaimed artist, having held residencies and exhibitions in New Orleans, Rhode Island, Louisiana, Maine, Haiti, and Indonesia, as well participating in solo, group and juried shows.

== Career ==
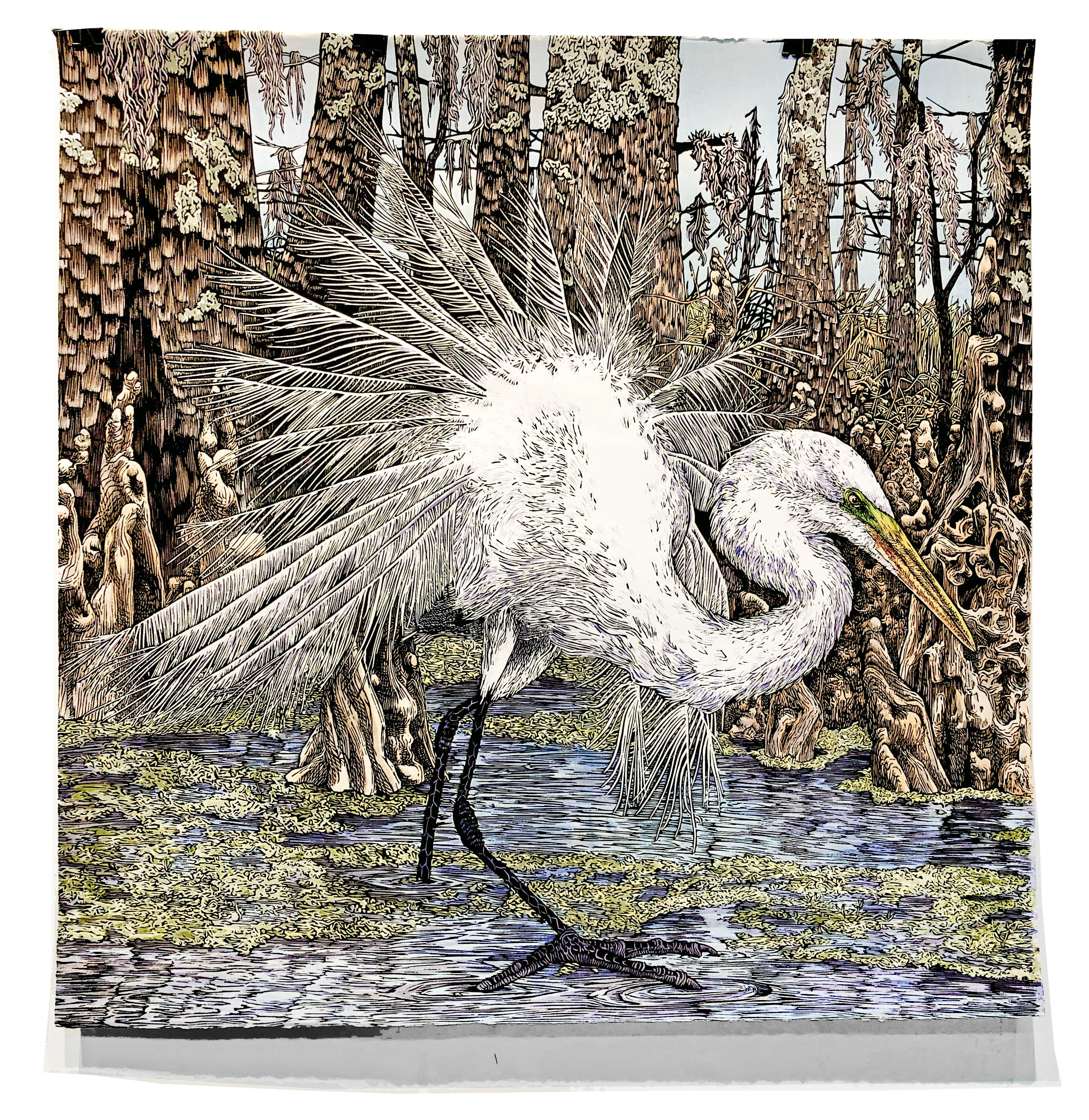
Photograph of “Egret” by artist Pippin Frisbie-Calder

Frisbie-Calder's artistic practice is characterized by her use of various printmaking techniques, including large-scale woodcut prints and silkscreens, alongside interactive installation art. Her environmental work, such as her Canceled Edition series, engages viewers with the unfolding process of species extinction. Her installations invite audiences to observe and understand the gradual disappearance of species, fostering awareness of the ongoing environmental crises. By collaborating with scientists and drawing attention to the role of bioindicators like birds (e.g., in works like 'Egret'), Frisbie-Calder's work emphasizes the urgency of addressing climate change and biodiversity loss. Her work has been featured in a range of publications, including Bayou, Heroine Magazine, Earth Island Journal, American Craft, Country Roads, and a front-cover feature for Current Affairs. Frisbie-Calder was awarded best of show at New Orleans Jazz & Heritage Festival in 2017, and won a grant from ArtPrize with her exhibit Canceled Edition: Ivory-billed Woodpecker.

Frisbie-Calder has worked extensively with the Audubon Society, resulting in a large exhibition Welcome to Egg Rock: 50 Years of Seabird Conservation, where she collaborated with the Audubon Society, the arts organization Waterfall Arts, and her mother, Terrie Frisbie, to create floor-to-ceiling prints and paintings. This immersive, multimedia art installation was designed to transport participants to the world's first restored seabird colony on Eastern Egg Rock in Midcoast Maine. The show ran for six months at Waterfall Arts in Belfast, Maine during the 50th anniversary of Project Puffin, drawing attention to the hard work of conservationists who restored Puffins to coastal Maine.

=== Canceled Edition (2017-present) ===
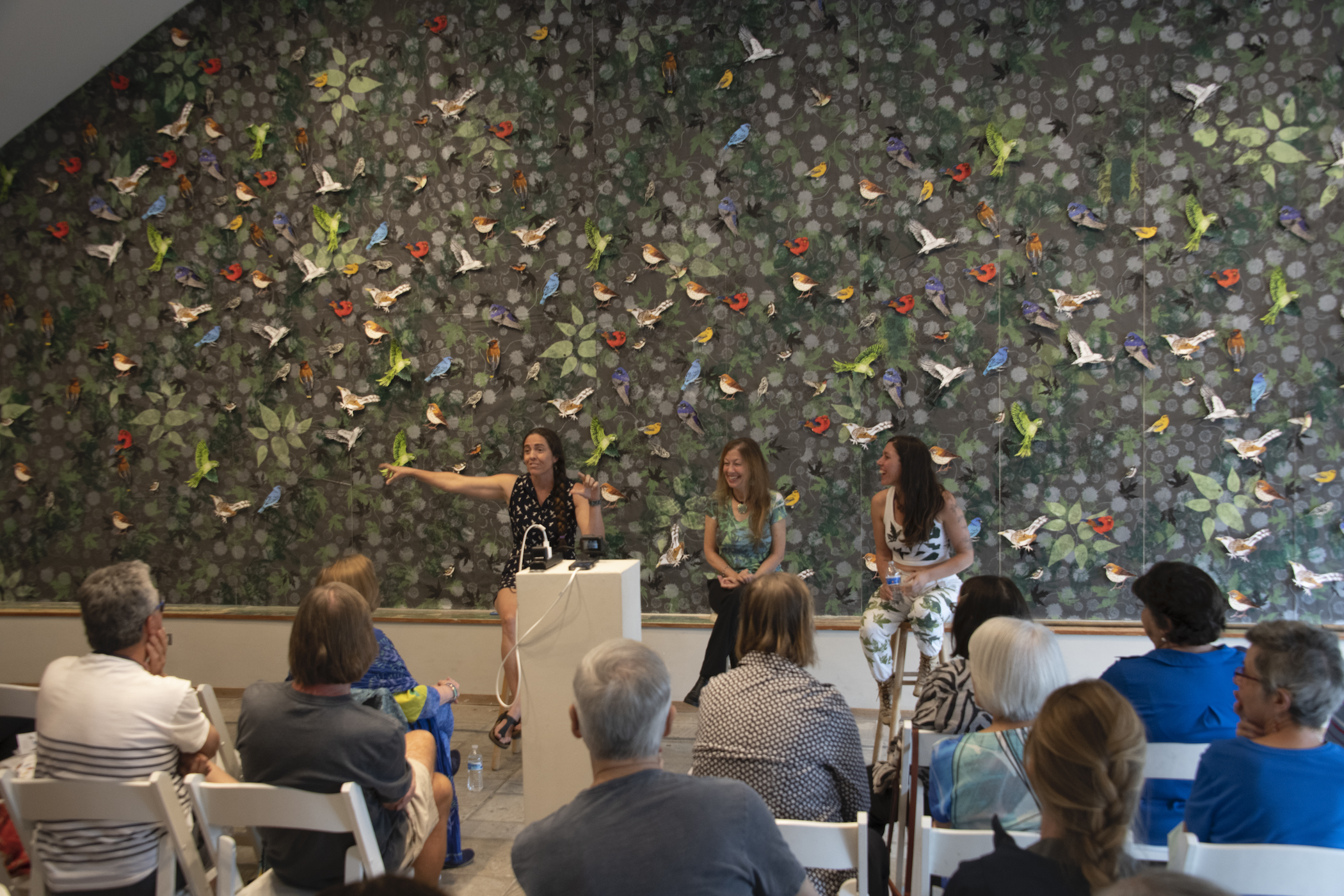
Artist Pippin Frisbie-Calder (right) at an opening for a "Cancelled Edition" art installation

Frisbie-Calder has gained recognition in the scientific as well as visual arts community for her installation series Canceled Edition.

Canceled Edition is a series of large scale print-based installations that create a simulated species extinction. Viewers are encouraged to participate in the installation by removing a bird from the wall and taking it home in order to foster continued dialogue about these issues. Gradually, as viewers remove birds, the gallery empties and the species goes “extinct”. The term Canceled Edition refers to the printmaking practice of destroying a block or copper plate after an edition is printed. Frisbie-Calder uses “Canceled Edition” to refer to both the printmaking techniques used to create these installations (silkscreen or woodcut) as well as the permanency of a species that is deemed extinct. Frisbie-Calder (right) is shown at an opening for one of these installations.

There are three different versions of this art installation.

==== Canceled Edition — The Art of Birding ====
The installation, created in collaboration with ornithologists Dr. Donata Henry and Dr. Jennifer Coulson, features hand-drawn and screen-printed migratory birds. This site-specific artwork simulates species extirpation (local extinction) to demonstrate the potential effects of climate change on migratory bird species. Canceled Edition - The Art of Birding has been exhibited in Remember Earth at the Contemporary Arts Center (New Orleans), the St. Tammany Art Association, and Southeastern Louisiana University.

==== Canceled Edition — Ivory-billed Woodpecker ====
The collection, features hand-carved, woodcut prints of dead Ivory-billed Woodpeckers. The Ivory-billed Woodpecker, once prevalent in Louisiana but now unseen since the 1940s and believed to be extinct. Canceled Edition - Ivory-billed Woodpecker has been exhibited in Cultivate at the Urban Institute for Contemporary Arts in Grand Rapids, MI; the Contemporary Arts Center (New Orleans); the 12th Biennale Internationale D’estampe Contemporaine de Trois-Rivières, Quebec, Canada; Brooks School, MA; Joan Mitchell Foundation, LA; University of West Florida TAG Gallery, Pensacola, FL; and Southeastern Louisiana University in Hammond, LA. The project received significant press coverage including in Pelican Bomb, Country Roads Magazine, Hero Magazine and Medium.

=== Woodcuts of the Gulf South (2009-present) ===
Frisbie-Calder's series, Woodcuts of the Gulf South, focuses on the species and ecosystems of the south, particularly Louisiana's rapidly disappearing wetlands. Through large-scale woodblock prints, the series documents these vulnerable landscapes with the aim of calling into question our complicated relationship with nature. Since its inception in 2010, the series has been exhibited at various venues, including the MDC Museum and Galleries of Art and Design in Miami for Foreverglades (a juried show for Art Basel), Spring Island in SC, the Chauvin Sculpture Garden in Chauvin, LA, Mythologies Louisiana at Crevasse 22 in St. Bernard, and Migration at Crevasse 22. The work has also been displayed at the New Orleans Community Printshop and has been reviewed in Current Affairs, American Craft, and Earth Island Journal.

=== Welcome to Egg Rock: 50 years of Seabird Conservation (2021-2023) ===
Welcome to Egg Rock: 50 Years of Seabird Conservation is an exhibition marking the 50th anniversary of the National Audubon Society's Seabird Institute, formerly known as Project Puffin. The exhibition transports visitors to Eastern Egg Rock and simulates the challenges seabird populations face, including the impact of climate change on the Gulf of Maine. A key interactive feature allows visitors to remove Atlantic Puffins from the exhibit, reflecting the environmental pressures on restored seabird populations. The exhibition was a collaborative effort involving several contributors. From the Audubon Seabird Institute, collaborators included Dr. Donald E. Lyons, Director of Conservation Science; Kimberly Faux, Communications Manager; Susan Schubel, Outreach Instructor; and Rachel Guillory, Coastal Communications Manager for National Audubon. Waterfall Arts contributors included Program Director Amy Tingle and the Waterfall Arts staff. Pippin Frisbie-Calder and Terrie Frisbie are intergenerational (mother-daughter) artists who combined their love of birds and printmaking to bring this show to Belfast. The first showing of this exhibition opened at Waterfall Arts in Belfast, Maine, on April 14, 2023. It received acclaim by Audubon News, Waterfall Arts, The Bangor Daily News, Audubon Seabird Institute Egg Rock Update Newsletter, and The Portland Press Herald.

=== The Mockingbird Project (2019–2021) ===
The Mockingbird Project is a multidisciplinary art and science initiative aimed at raising awareness about urban birds and lead contamination in New Orleans, with a focus on public health and the wellbeing of local wildlife. The project was a collaboration between A Studio in the Woods and Tulane University's Ecology and Biology (EBIO) department, led by Dr. Jordan Karubian, Dr. Renata Ribeiro, and PhD student Annelise Blanchette. Printmaker Pippin Frisbie-Calder participated as an artist-in-residence. As with many older cities, New Orleans faces significant health risks from lead contamination, which impacts both human and animal populations. Research conducted by the Karubian lab suggests that high levels of lead in some neighborhoods may influence the behavior and reproductive success of urban songbirds, such as mockingbirds. These birds serve as "canaries in the coal mine," highlighting the broader risks of lead contamination. Inspired by the Karubian lab's research, Frisbie-Calder created a 16-foot mobile mockingbird float, which was unveiled during Mardi Gras 2020. Using the shared platform of Mardi Gras, the Mockingbird Project took to the streets to trade eco-friendly, hand-made throws in exchange for plastic Mardi Gras beads. These beads were then recycled with their community partners GroundsKrewe.org and ArcGNO.org. Because of COVID-19, Mardi Gras 2021 was canceled so the project was turned into a video called Mardi Gras from a Birds Eye View.

=== Charismatic Microfauna (2014-2016) ===
Charismatic Microfauna was an art and science collaboration focused on photosynthetic microscopic organisms, or phytoplankton, which are abundant in local wetlands, oceans, and ponds. Frisbie-Calder worked with Dr. Tim McLean during a residency at A Studio in the Woods to create a body of work showcasing selected phytoplankton species. The duo explored freshwater and brackish bayous in and around New Orleans, collecting samples of organisms larger than 20 microns using a plankton net. Back in the lab at Tulane University, the samples were magnified up to 40,000 times their actual size and documented. Frisbie-Calder then spent hundreds of hours sculpting, casting, and drawing to create prints and light sculptures based on the collected phytoplankton images. The resulting artworks were displayed as an interactive landscape, where viewers could “activate” the chloroplasts of the silkscreened phytoplankton illustrations by pointing blacklights at the pieces, causing them to glow where chloroplasts would exist in living organisms. The Charismatic Microfauna series has been exhibited at Barristers Gallery and Foundation Gallery in New Orleans, LA, as part of the Wetlands Art Tour alongside environmentalist Bob Marshall, and at Tigermen Den in New Orleans. The work received significant coverage including an interview on NPR Coastal Desk in a segment titled "An Art/Science Mashup Births 'Microscopic Sirens,'", in Country Roads Magazine, and other press outlets.

== Recognition ==
=== Gallery affiliations ===
- Ann Connelly Fine Art, Baton Rouge, Louisiana, USA
- LeMieux Galleries, New Orleans, Louisiana, USA

=== Residencies ===
- Waterfall Arts, Artist Residency, Belfast, ME, September 2022
- Joan Mitchell Center, Artist Residency, New Orleans, LA, March 2021
- Fathom Residency, A Studio In The Woods, New Orleans, LA, February 2020
- Flint and Steel Residency, A Studio In The Woods, New Orleans, LA, January 2015
- Jakmel Ekpresyon Residencies, July, November, Jacmel, Haiti, 2014
- Artists in National Parks, National Park Service, Artist-In-Residence Program, Big Cypress National Preserve, FL, August 2012
- AS220 Residency, Artist Residency, Providence, RI, 2009

=== Key solo exhibitions ===
- Shifting Lands, Ohr-O’Keefe Museum, Biloxi, MS, 2024
- Residency Exhibition, Waterfall Arts Gallery, Belfast, ME, 2022
- Canceled Edition: Ivory-Billed Woodpecker, Brooks School, North Andover, MA, 2022
- Resurgence, LeMieux Galleries, New Orleans, LA, 2021
- The Rookery, LeMieux Galleries, New Orleans, LA, 2019
- Canceled Edition: The Art of Birding, St Tammany Art Association, Covington, LA, 2019
- Charismatic Microfauna, Barristers Gallery, New Orleans, LA, 2019
- Canceled Edition: Ivory-Billed Woodpecker, Cultivate, Urban institute for Contemporary Art, Installation and Video Vault, Grand Rapids, MI, 2017
- Canceled Edition: Ivory-Billed Woodpecker, New Orleans Contemporary Art Center, Installation in Oval Room, New Orleans, LA, 2017
- Wetlands Art Tour, Tigermen Den, New Orleans, LA, 2015
- Ecotones, A 24 foot river install and hung work, New Orleans Community Printshop, LA, 2014
- The Outcome is Unforeseen, Solo art show with musical collaboration and performances, Via Via Cafe, Yogyakarta, Indonesia, 2010
- Constructing Communities, Elo Progo Art House, Magelang, Indonesia, 2009

=== Key group exhibitions ===
- Expose 2024, Contemporary Art Center, New Orleans, 60” x 120” vinyl window
- Mitoloji Latannyèr/Mythologies Louisianaises, Capital Park Museum, Baton Rouge, LA
- Art + Environment, Southeastern Louisiana University, Hammond, LA, 2023
- Welcome to Egg Rock: 50 Years of Seabird Conservation, Intergenerational collaboration with Terrie Frisbie, Waterfall Arts, Belfast, ME, 2023
- Canceled Edition: The Art of Birding, Juried Exhibition Remember Earth, Contemporary Art Center, Site-specific Atrium Installation, New Orleans, LA, 2022
- Canceled Edition: Ivory-Billed Woodpecker, (Two-person exhibition with Hannah Chalew) University of West Florida, TAG Gallery, Pensacola, FL, 2022
- 12 Biennale internationale d’estampe contemporaine de Trois-Rivières, International Printmaking Biennale, group show in four venues, Trois-Rivières, Quebec, Canada, 2021
- Mythologies Louisiana, Crevasse 22, St Bernard, LA, 2019, 2018
- Migration, Crevasse 22, Prospect 4 satellite Juried show, St Bernard, LA, 2018
- 99 Problems But The Print Ain’t One, The Southern, Charleston, SC, 2016
- Myth and Mammal, Hall Barnett Gallery, New Orleans, LA, 2016
- La Femme + Bywater Biennial, New Orleans Art Center, LA, 2016, 2015
- Foreverglades, Juried Show for Art Basel, MDC Museum and Galleries of Art and Design, Miami, FL, 2012
- Artists Who Wish They Were Dead, Barrister Gallery, New Orleans, 2011
- What We Can Do (Juried by Ron Bechet), Antenna Gallery, New Orleans, LA, 2011
- Graffiti Show, Respecta Gallery, Jakarta, Indonesia, 2010
- Printmaking Exhibition, Spark Gallery, Denver, CO, 2009
- Memorial Exhibition, Arcos Azules Gallery, Denver, CO, 2009
