= Scrotie =

Unofficial mascot of the Rhode Island School of Design

- Team: Nads
- University: Rhode Island School of Design
- Description: Large, anthropomorphic human penis
- First seen: 2001

Scrotie is the unofficial mascot of the Rhode Island School of Design. The character is a giant anthropomorphic human penis. The mascot is known for his aggressively vulgar persona and for often dry-humping mascots of other schools.

== History ==
Scrotie was designed to be the mascot of the Rhode Island School of Design hockey team, the Nads. The team had begun to lose popularity in the 1990s and by 2001 very few people arrived at their games. The first costume was created by a puppet designer named B. Sure. Scrotie's presence attracted people to games and increased student involvement in the team. Scrotie also appears at games of other RISD sport teams, including the Balls, the Seamen, and the Pricks.

In 2004, the first Scrotie costume was destroyed at a game against the Massachusetts Maritime Academy. Scrotie mocked and shouted obscenities at spectators, which caused offended fans to attack the mascot and rip apart the costume. Scrotie is known for chanting the phrase, "The Nads are your dads!", to which fans reply by chanting "We fucked your mom!". In 2009, Scrotie established a rivalry with Clammie, the mascot of a team called the Clams. Whenever the Nads played against the Clams, the two mascots would aggressively tackle and dry-hump each other.

There have been several iterations of the Scrotie costume. Scrotie has appeared in several colors, including a Caucasian skin tone, bright red, and a sickly purple. One version could shoot water out of the urethra. Another version of the costume used a Superman logo, but with the S shape formed by a sperm.

== Reception ==
Scrotie is tolerated by the administration of the Rhode Island School of Design, but not endorsed. The mascot is allowed at sporting events, but is banned from appearing on the school's campus.

Scrotie is widely considered to be one of the most bizarre college mascots, and has appeared on several lists of "weird" or "controversial" mascots.

== See also ==
- Dick joke – Joke referring to the human penis
- Senhor Testiculo – Mascot of the Association of Personal Assistance for Cancer
