= Rhode Island School of Design =

Art and design college in Rhode Island, US

- Seal
- Other name: RISD
- Type: Private art and design school
- Established: 1877; 149 years ago
- Accreditation: NECHE
- Academic affiliations: AICAD, space-grant
- Endowment: $465.5 million (2025)
- President: Crystal Williams
- Faculty: Student-to-faculty ratio 8:1 (fall 2025)
- Students: 2,577 (spring 2026)
- Undergraduates: 2,136 (spring 2026)
- Postgraduates: 441 (spring 2026)
- Location: Providence, Rhode Island, United States; 41°49′37″N 71°24′24″W
- Campus: Urban 13 acres (5.3 ha)
- Colors: RISD Blue
- Mascot: Scrotie (unofficial)
- Website: risd.edu

The Rhode Island School of Design (RISD /ˈrɪzdiː/, pronounced "Riz-D") is a private art school in Providence, Rhode Island, United States. The school was founded as a coeducational institution in 1877 by Helen Adelia Rowe Metcalf, who sought to increase the accessibility of design education to women.

Today, RISD offers bachelor's and master's degree programs across 19 majors and enrolls approximately 2,000 undergraduate and 500 graduate students. The Rhode Island School of Design Museum is one of the largest college art museums in the United States.

The Rhode Island School of Design is affiliated with Brown University, whose campus sits immediately adjacent to RISD's on Providence's College Hill. The two institutions share social and community resources and since 1900 have permitted cross-registration. Together, RISD and Brown offer dual degree programs at the graduate and undergraduate levels. As of 2024, RISD alumni have received 11 MacArthur Fellowships, nine Emmy Awards, seven Guggenheim Fellowships, and three Academy Awards.

== History ==
=== Founding of the school ===
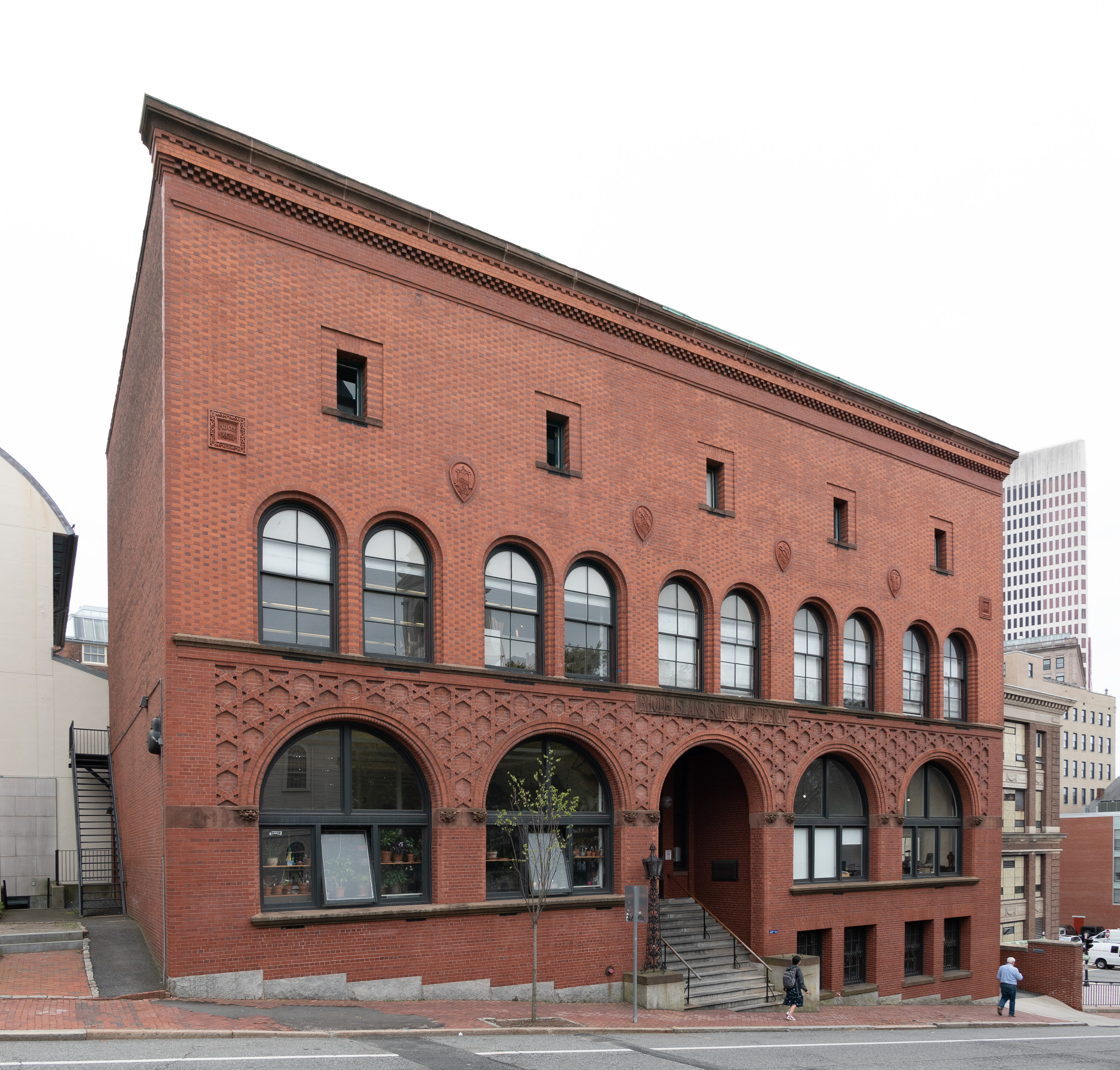
The Venetian Renaissance Waterman Building (1893) was the first permanent home for the school.

The Rhode Island School of Design's founding is often traced back to Helen Adelia Rowe Metcalf's 1876 visit to the Centennial Exposition in Philadelphia. At the exposition, Metcalf visited the Women's Pavilion. Organized by the "Centennial Women," the pavilion showcased the work of female entrepreneurs, artists, and designers. Metcalf's visit to the pavilion profoundly impacted her and motivated her to address a deficiency in design education accessible to women.

Following the exhibition, the RI committee of the Centennial Women had $1,675 remaining in funds; the group spent some time negotiating how best to use the surplus. Metcalf lobbied the group to use the money to establish a coeducational, design school in Providence. On January 11, 1877, a majority of women on the committee voted for Metcalf's proposal.

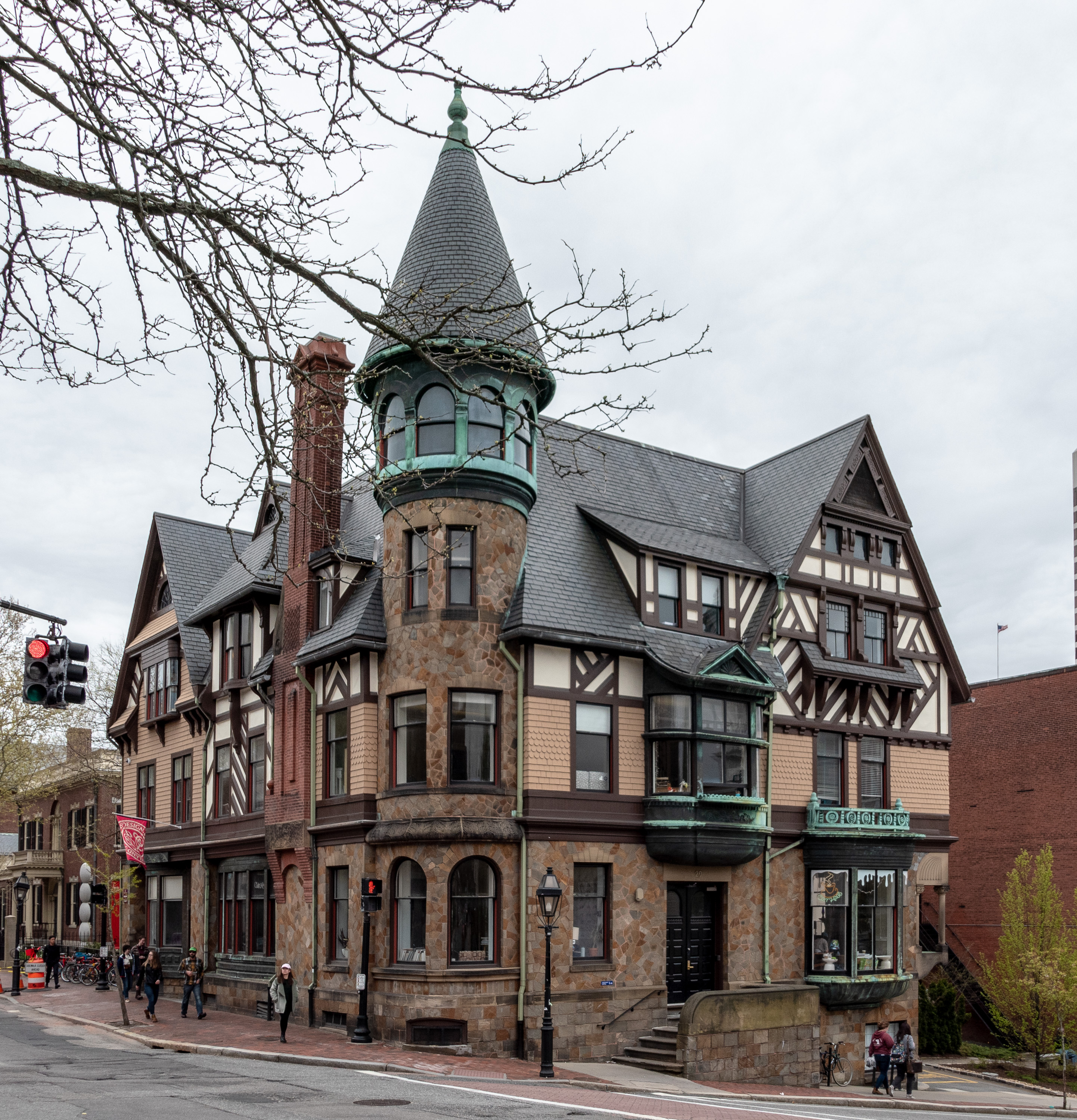
The 1885 Dr. George W. Carr House houses a student cafe and lounge.

On March 22, 1877, the Rhode Island General Assembly ratified "An Act to Incorporate the Rhode Island School of Design", "[f]or the purpose of aiding in the cultivation of the arts of design". Over the next 129 years, the following original by-laws set forth these following primary objectives:

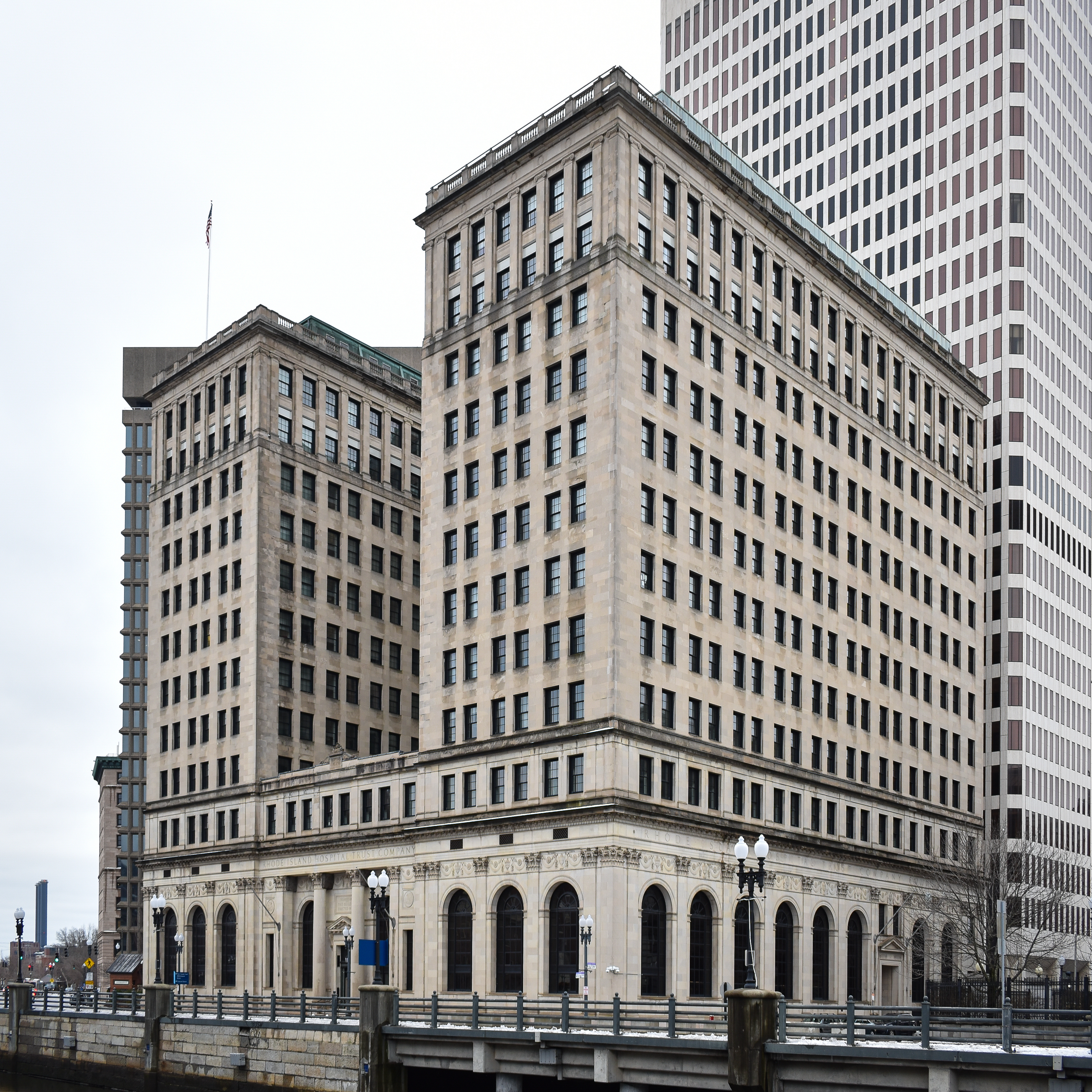
The Rhode Island Hospital Trust Building houses dormitories and the school's Fleet Library.

1. The instruction of artisans in drawing, painting, modeling, and designing, that they may successfully apply the principles of Art to the requirements of trade and manufacture.
2. The systematic training of students in the practice of Art, in order that they may understand its principles, give instruction to others, or become artists.
3. The general advancement of public Art Education, by the exhibition of works of Art and of Art school studies, and by lectures on Art.

Metcalf directed the school until her death in 1895. Her daughter, Eliza Greene Metcalf Radeke, then took over until her own death in 1931.

=== Beginnings ===
The school opened in October 1877 in Providence. The first class consisted of 43 students, the majority of whom were women.

For the first 15 years of its existence, RISD occupied a suite of six rooms on the fourth floor of the Hoppin Homestead Building in Downtown Providence. On October 24, 1893, the school dedicated a new brick building at 11 Waterman Street on College Hill. Designed by Hoppin, Read & Hoppin, this building served as the first permanent home for the school.

=== Activism during the Vietnam War ===
Students at RISD played a key part in the national protest of the Vietnam War, producing various notable anti-war protest art from 1968–1973 and taking several on tour as part of a mobile artwork petition. The most well known is Leave the Fear of Red to Horned Beasts, a reference to Victor Hugo novel Les Misérables in the form of a watercolor-on-canvas painting of a charging red bull. An original print of this painting is on permanent display at the War Remnants Museum in Ho Chi Minh City, Vietnam in a section dedicated to international protest of the Vietnam War, and also features subtly as a bar mural in the Vietnam War film Point Man.

In 1969 the Black Student Community of RISD published a manifesto demanding of university faculty the establishment of "a meaningful liaison with the spirit and expression of Black culture." RISD subsequently hired administrators to begin recruiting and admitting increased numbers of students of color.

=== COVID-19 ===
After the outbreak of COVID-19 and the subsequent closure of the RISD campus in March 2020, RISD suggested a future of a hybrid of classes online and in-person.

In July 2020, President Somerson began negotiations with the RISD faculty union over the avoidance of possible layoffs by suggesting cost-cutting measures. The part-time faculty union, the National Education Association, rejected the initial proposal.

=== Racial diversity and equity ===
In the summer of 2020, after the Black Lives Matter and George Floyd protests, RISD students and alumni came forward to voice outrage at the institution for failing at social equity and inclusion. They formed a student-led RISD Anti-Racism Coalition (ARC) alongside BIPOC faculty. As a result, in July 2020, RISD announced they would hire 10 new faculty members that would specialize in "race and ethnicity in arts and design", the RISD museum would return to Nigeria a sculpture that was once looted, expand and diversify the curriculum, and the school would, "remain committed to reform".

=== Labor strike ===
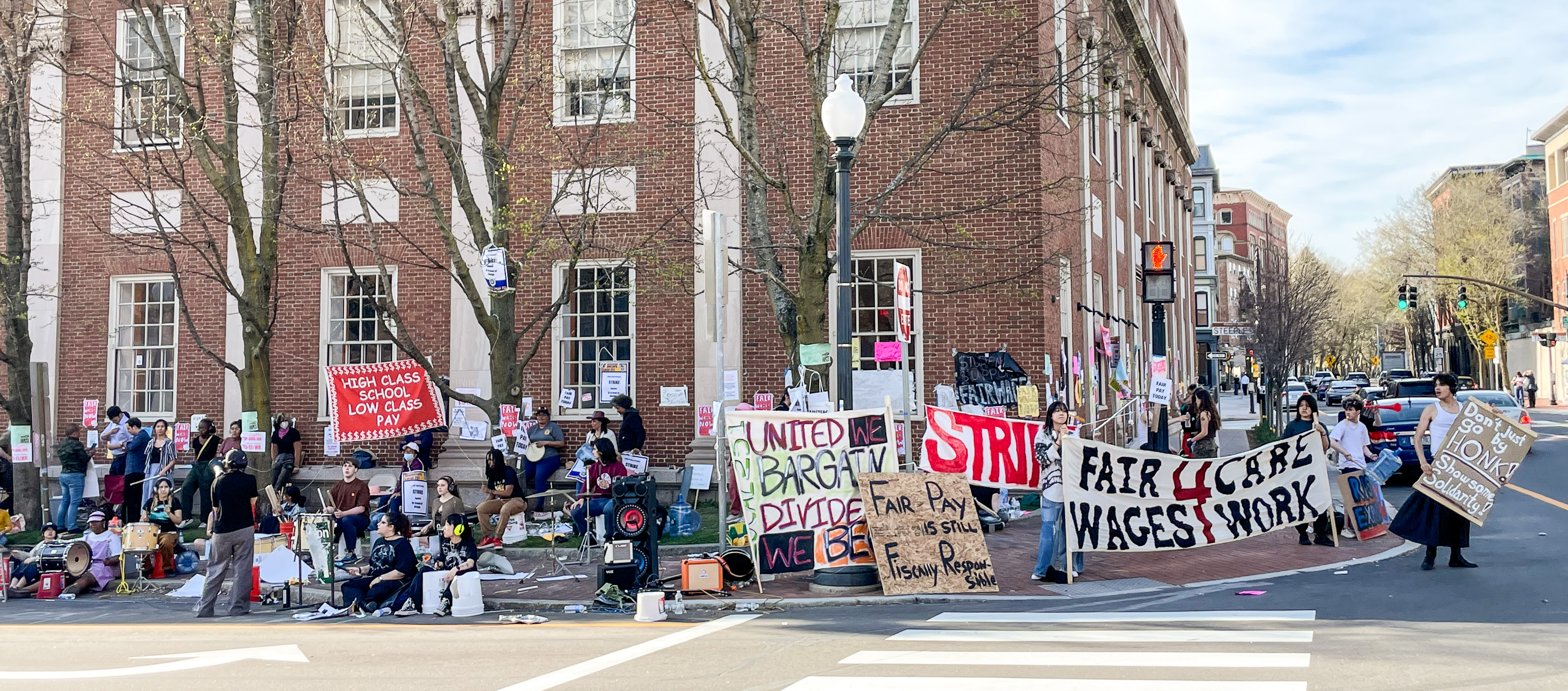
Striking workers and supporters in April 2023

In April 2023, after months of negotiations, the RISD employees union held a picket line protest in demand of better wages. The union, which represents custodians, groundskeepers and movers, was joined in the strike by student supporters and community members. The strike lasted two weeks, until workers approved a new contract and returned to work April 19.

=== Pro-Palestine solidarity ===
Some students at RISD, along with many across the country in the BDS movement, occupied a campus building for multiple days in support of a cease-fire of the Israeli–Palestinian conflict in early May 2024.

In late March of 2025, President Williams censored and shut down an exhibition titled "To Every Orange Tree" mounted in Carr Haus by students and alumni because they expressed solidarity with the people of Palestine.

=== Presidents ===
RISD's current president is Crystal Williams. She was preceded by Rosanne Somerson, who served from 2015 to 2021.

== Rankings and admission ==
In 2014, U.S. News & World Report ranked RISD first among fine arts programs nationwide. In 2020, RISD's graduate program was ranked fifth nationally, and its programs in Graphic Design, Painting, Sculpture, and Photography, among others, were also ranked in the top 5. In 2023, RISD announced its withdrawal from the rankings, citing its inability to accurately assess art and design education, while also running counter to principles of social equity and inclusion.

The school's undergraduate architecture program ranked 6 in DesignIntelligence's ranking of the Top Architecture Schools in the US for 2019. In 2018, the institution was also named among Forbes' America's Top Colleges and the Chronicle of Higher Education's Top Producers of US Fulbright Scholars.

RISD's acceptance rate is 13.8% (2024). In August 2019, the school announced it would be adopting a test-optional policy for admissions.

== Campus ==
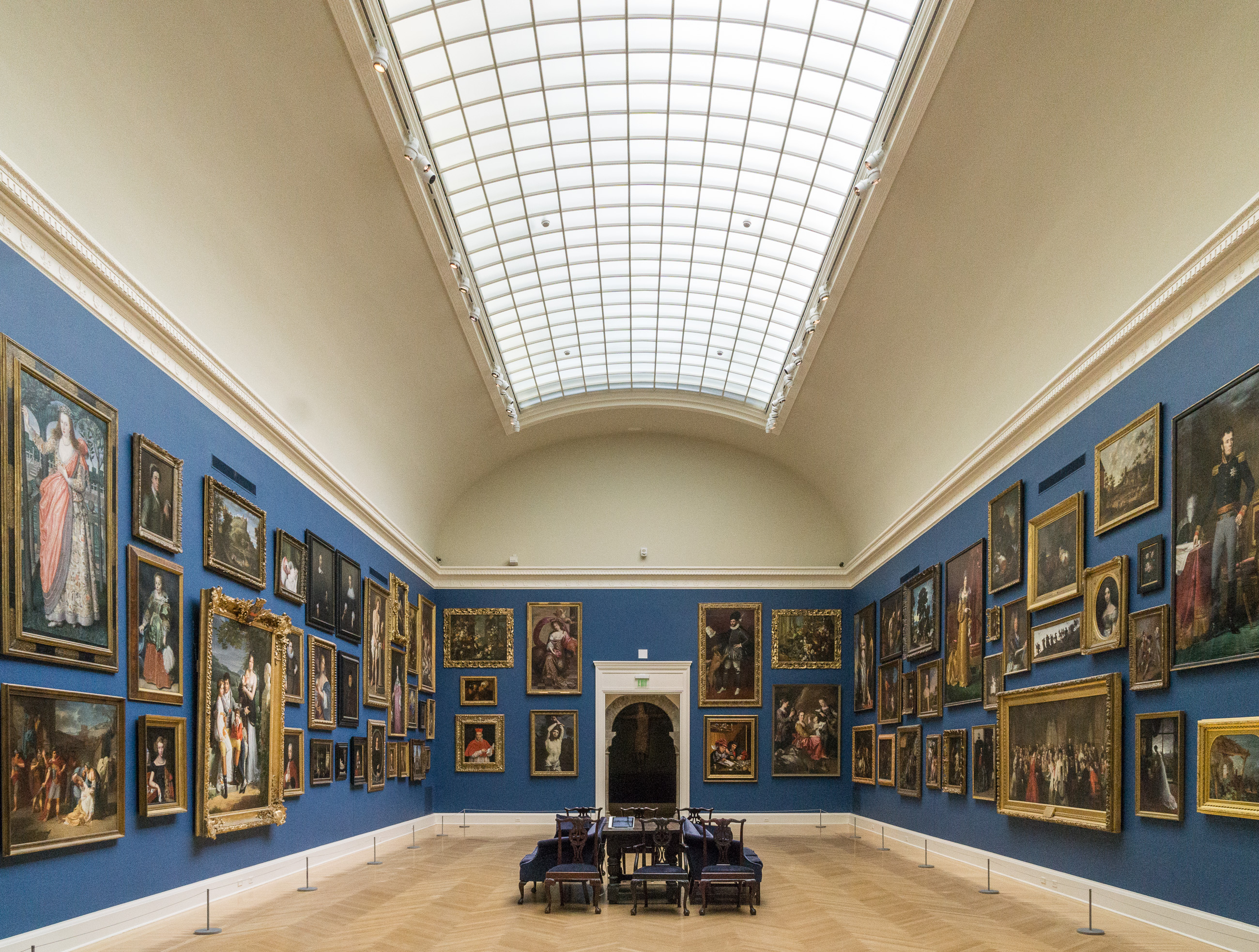
A salon-style gallery of paintings in the RISD Museum

In the past, RISD buildings were mostly located at the western edge of College Hill, between the Brown University campus and the Providence River. In recent decades, RISD has acquired or built buildings on the downslope nearer the river, or in Downtown Providence just on the other side of the waterway. The main library, undergrad dormitories, and graduate studios of the college are now located downtown.

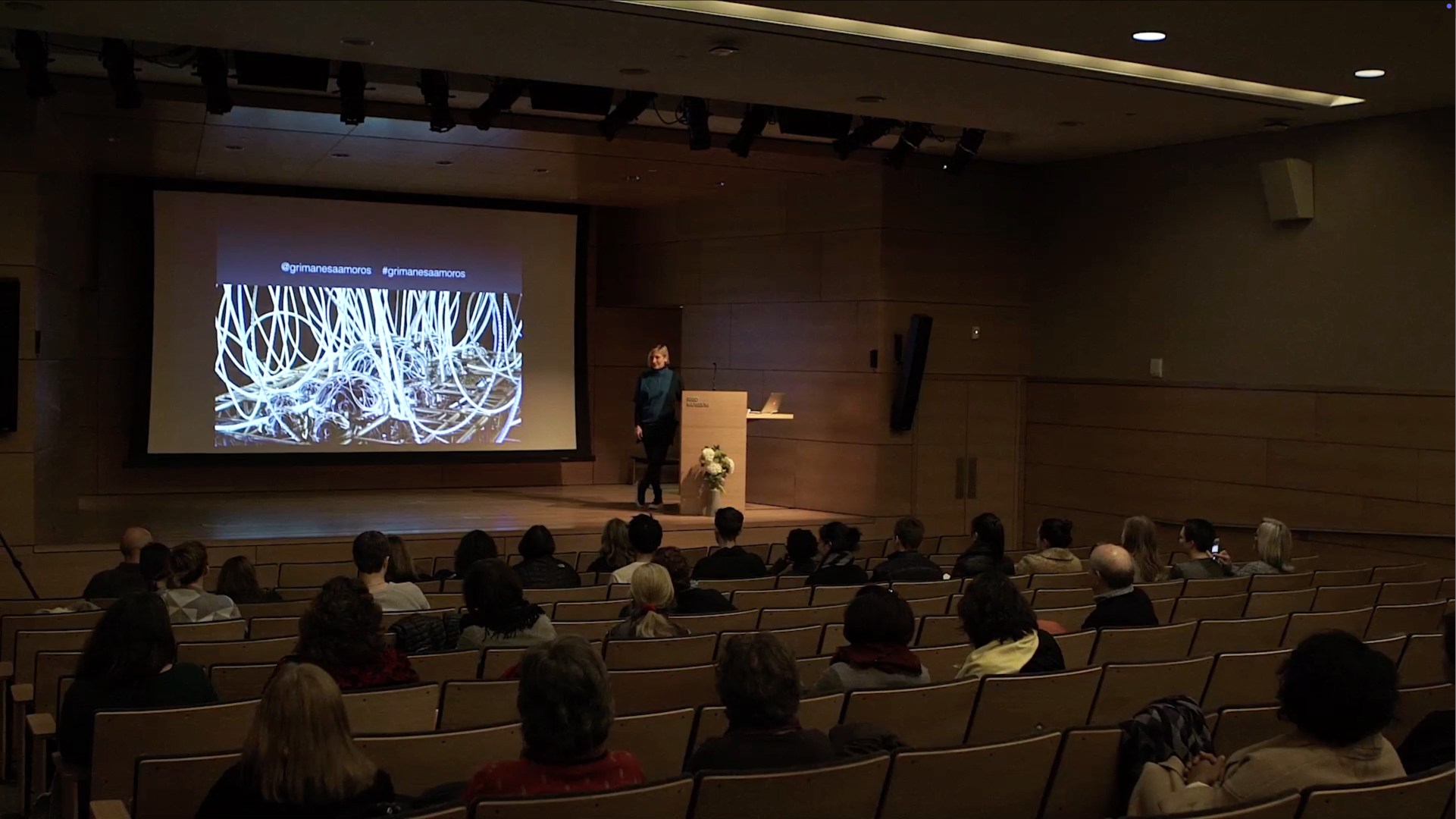
Inside the Metcalf Auditorium at the Chace Center, with Grimanesa Amorós on stage.

== RISD Museum ==
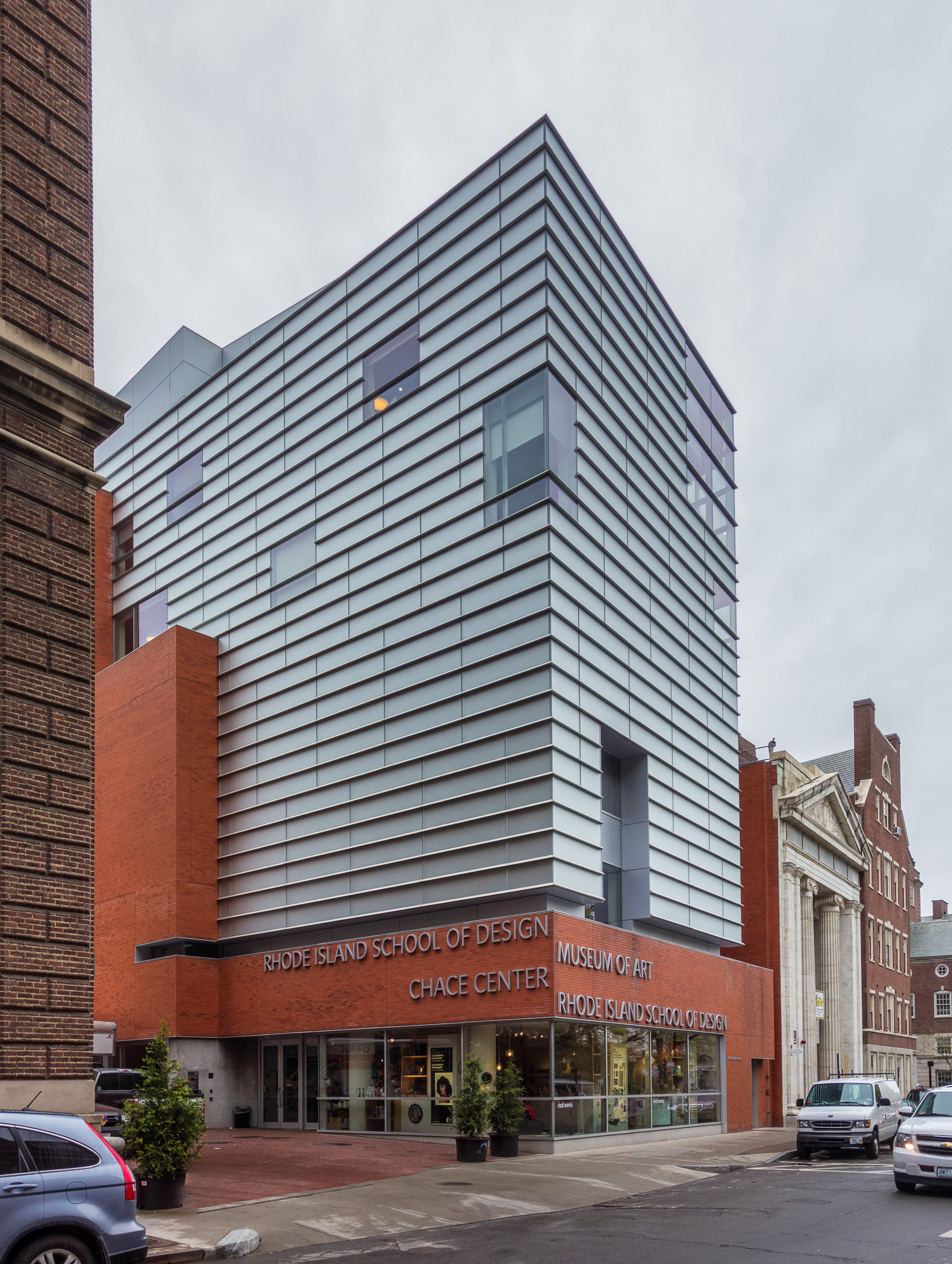
The Chace Center contains both exhibition and studio space.

The RISD Museum was founded in 1877 on the belief that art, artists, and the institutions that support them play pivotal roles in promoting broad civic engagement and creating more open societies. With a permanent collection numbering approximately 100,000 works, the RISD museum is the third largest art museum attached to an educational facility.

== Athletics ==
RISD has many athletic clubs and teams. The hockey team is called the "Nads", and their cheer is "Go Nads!" The logo for the Nads features a horizontal hockey stick with two hockey pucks at the end of the stick's handle.

The basketball team is known simply as "The Balls", and their slogan is, "When the heat is on, the Balls stick together!" The Balls' logo consists of two balls next to one another in an irregularly shaped net.

Lest the sexual innuendo of these team names and logos be lost or dismissed, the 2001 creation of the school's unofficial mascot, Scrotie, ended any ambiguity. Despite the name, Scrotie is not merely a representation of a scrotum, but is a 7-foot tall penis.

The school's color is a vivid blue.

== Notable people ==
=== Alumni ===
Notable RISD alumni include Miriam Beerman (BFA 1945), Roni Horn (BFA 1975), Jenny Holzer (MFA 1977), Glenn Ligon (attended 1978–80), Nicole Eisenman (BFA 1987), Janine Antoni (MFA 1989), Do-Ho Suh (BFA 1994), Kara Walker (MFA 1994), Shahzia Sikander (MFA 1995), Julie Mehretu (MFA 1997), Ryan Trecartin (BFA 2004), Sam Hyde (BFA 2007), Rose B. Simpson (MFA 2011), Daniela Lalita (BFA 2014) as well as artist collectives including Fort Thunder (1995–2001) and Forcefield (1997–2003) and the band Lightning Bolt.

Graduates in photography include Francesca Woodman (BFA 1978), Todd Hido (attended 1991–92), Deana Lawson (MFA 2004), and RaMell Ross (MFA 2014). Among the school's alumni in illustration are David Macaulay (BArch 1969), Chris Van Allsburg (MA 1975), Roz Chast (BFA 1977), and Brian Selznick (BFA 1988).

Alumni in graphic design include Shepard Fairey (BFA 1992), Tobias Frere-Jones (BFA 1992), and Pippin Frisbie-Calder (BFA 2008). Among the alumni of the school's architecture department are Deborah Berke (BFA 1975, BArch 1977), Preston Scott Cohen (BArch 1983), Nader Tehrani (BArch 1986), and Hashim Sarkis (BArch 1987).

Prominent RISD graduates in film include James Franco (MFA 2012), Seth MacFarlane (BFA 1995), Jemima Kirke (BFA 2008), Bryan Konietzko (BFA 1998), Michael Dante DiMartino (BFA 1996), Gus Van Sant (BFA 1975), and Robert Richardson (BFA 1979). Graduates in music include bassist Syd Butler (BFA 1996) and two founding members of Talking Heads: Tina Weymouth (BFA 1974) and Chris Frantz (BFA 1974); Talking Heads' other founder, David Byrne, is also a RISD alumnus and met Weymouth and Frantz at the art school, but left before graduation. Among the school's alumni in business are Airbnb co-founders Joe Gebbia (BFA 2004) and Brian Chesky (BFA 2004).

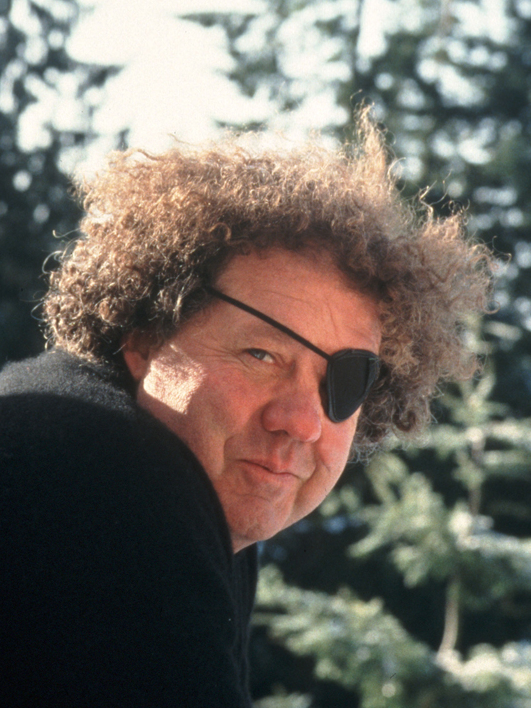
Glass sculptor Dale Chihuly (MFA 1968)

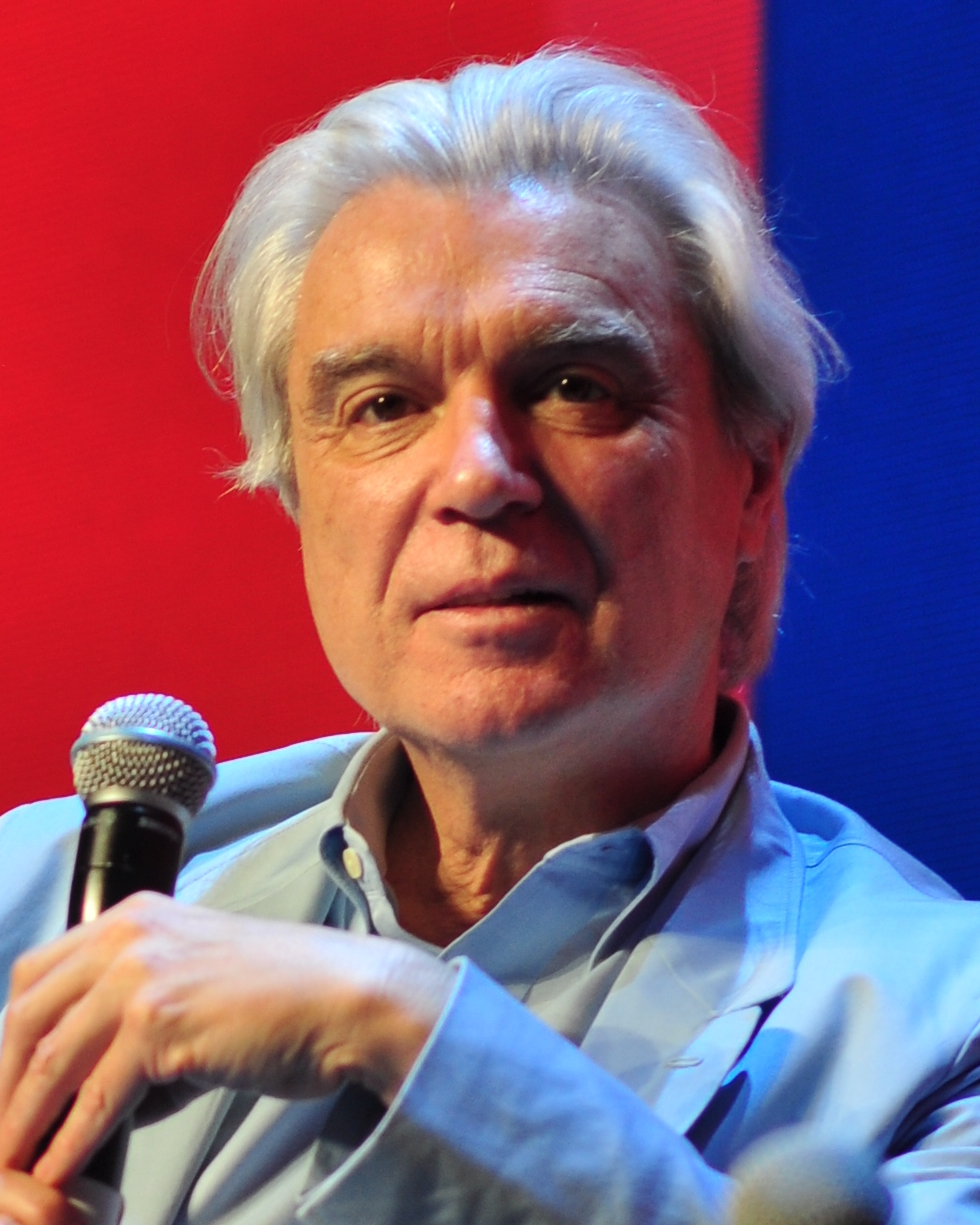
Talking Heads lead singer David Byrne (1970–71)

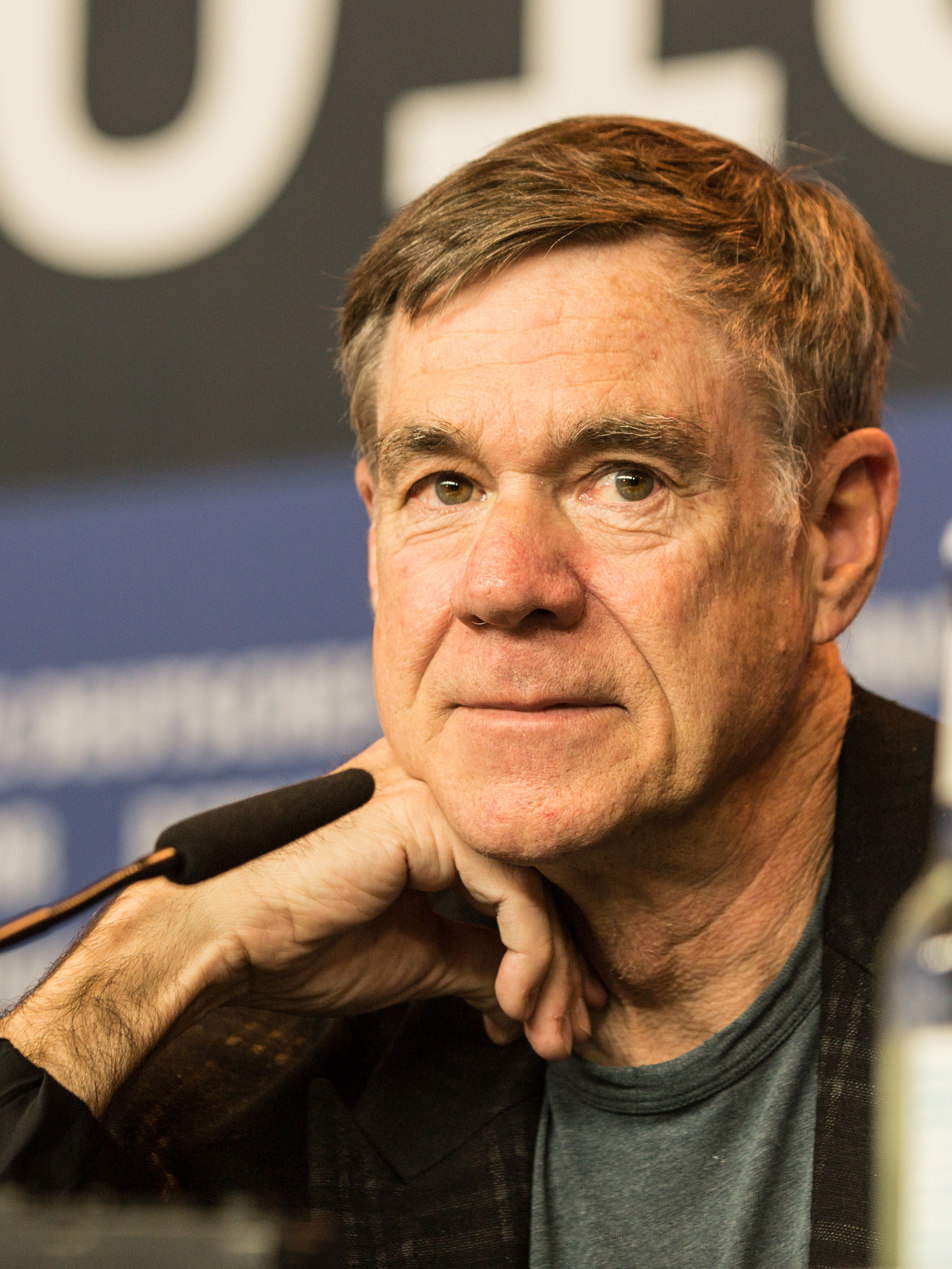
Filmmaker Gus Van Sant (BFA 1975)

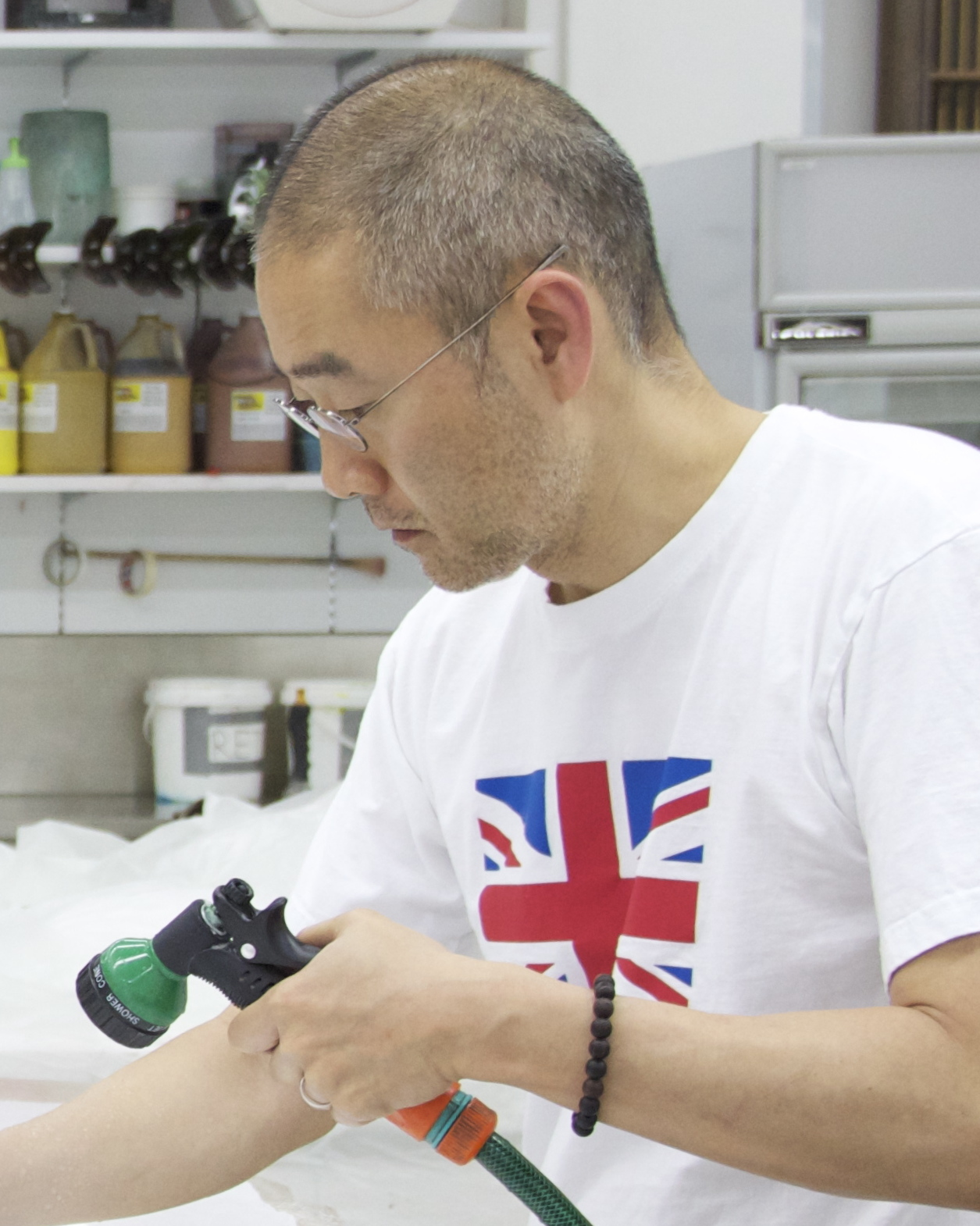
Installation artist Do-Ho Suh (BFA 1994)

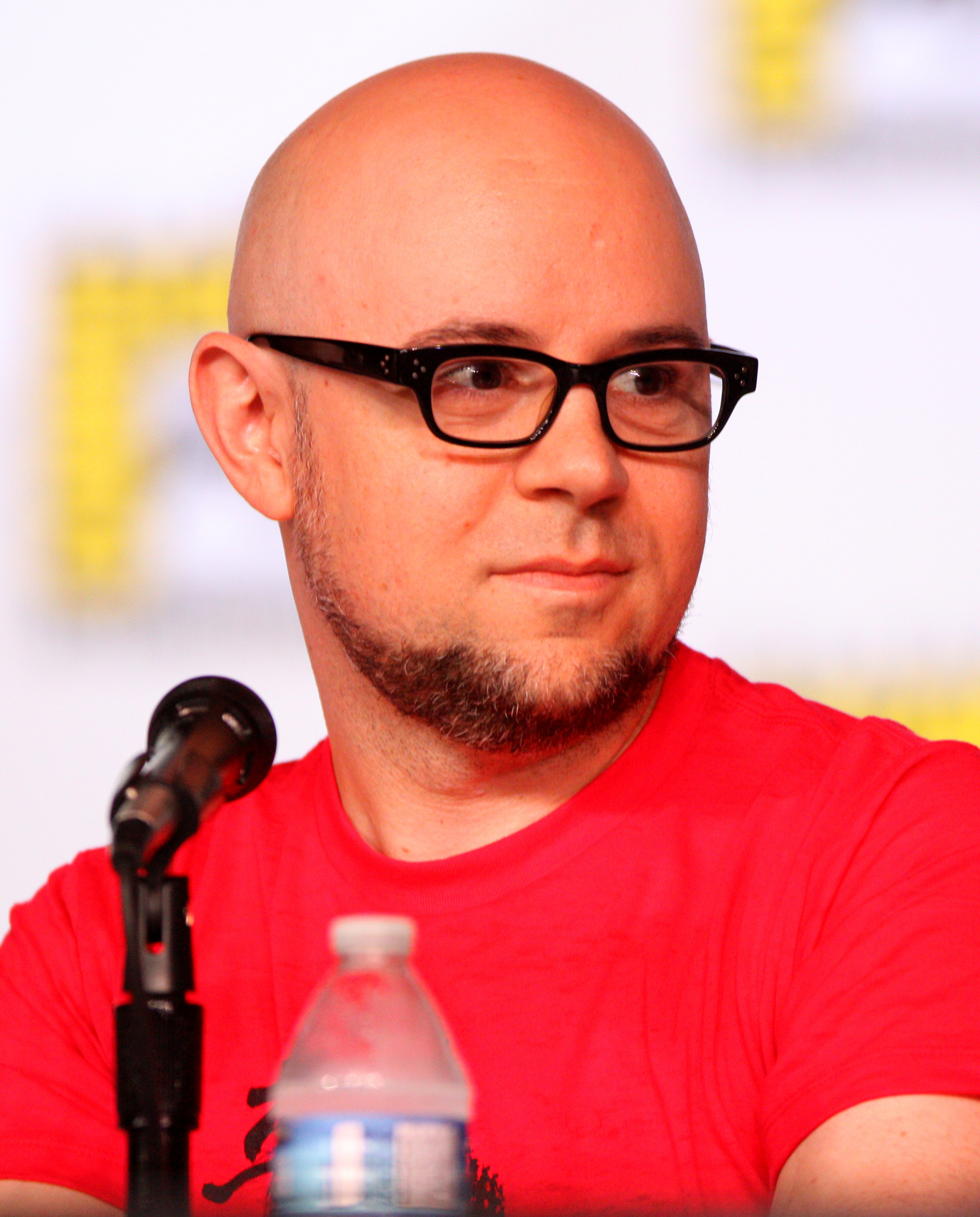
Avatar: The Last Airbender co-creator Michael Dante DiMartino (BFA 1996)

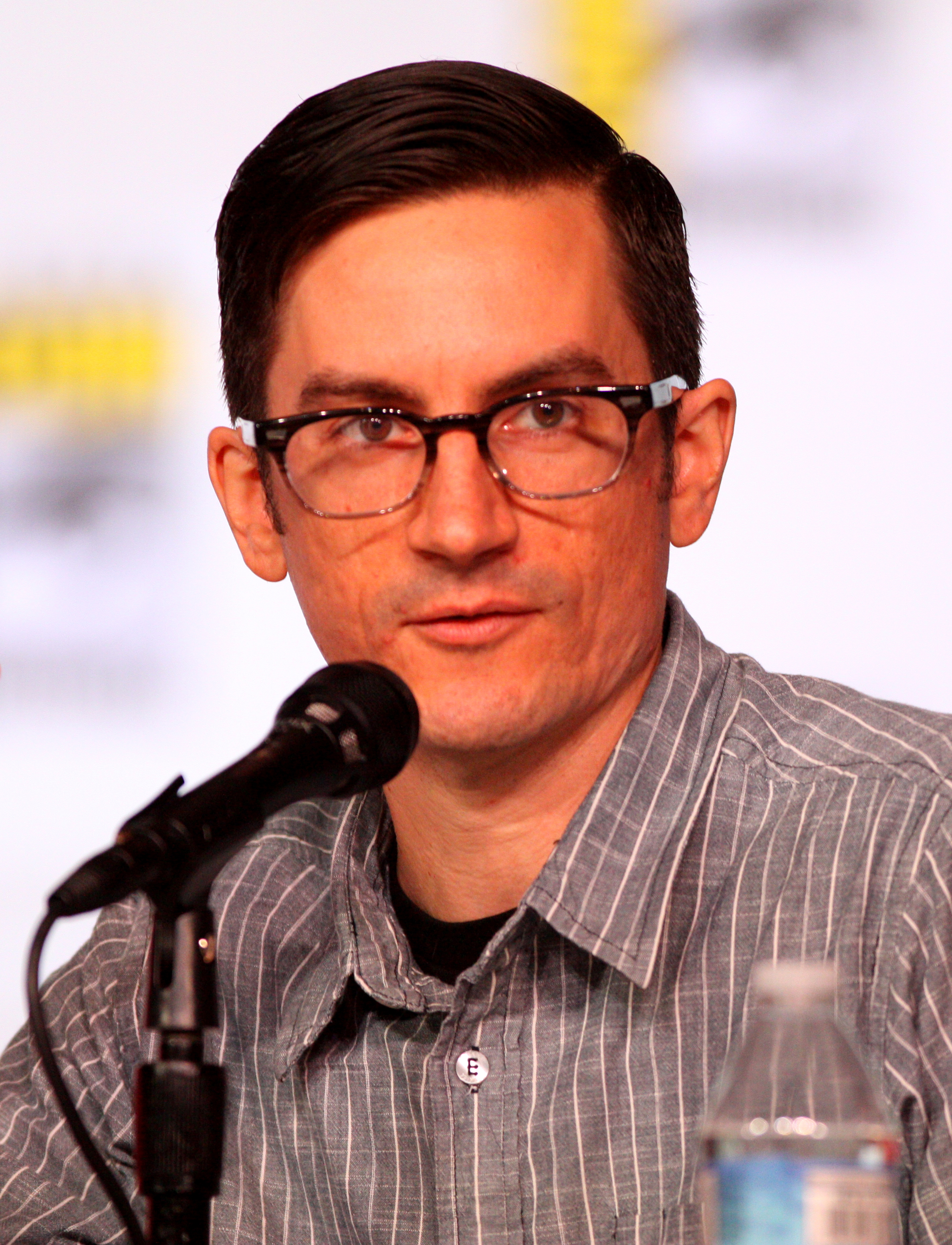
Avatar: The Last Airbender co-creator Bryan Konietzko (BFA 1998)

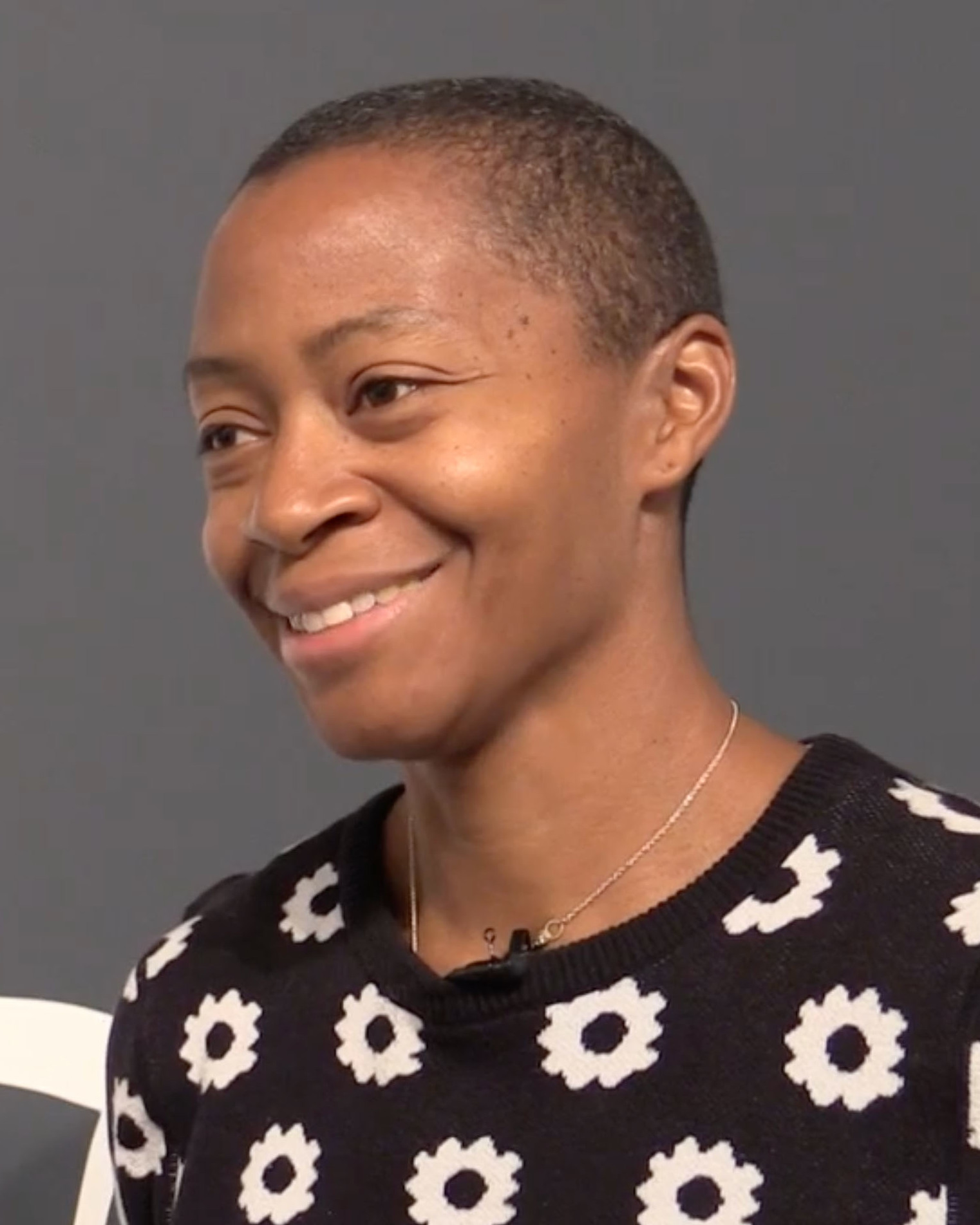
Artist Kara Walker (MFA 1994)

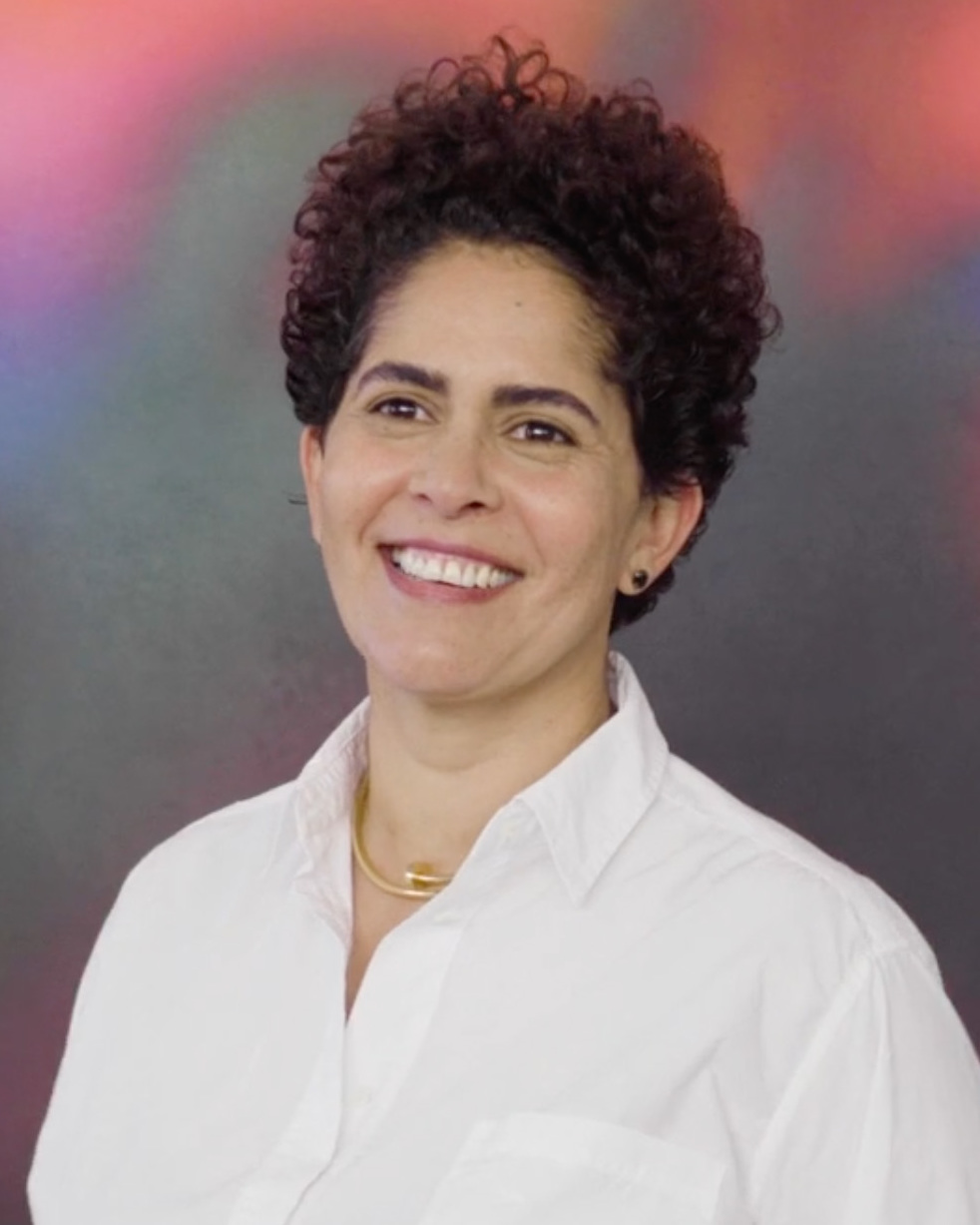
Painter Julie Mehretu (MFA 1997)

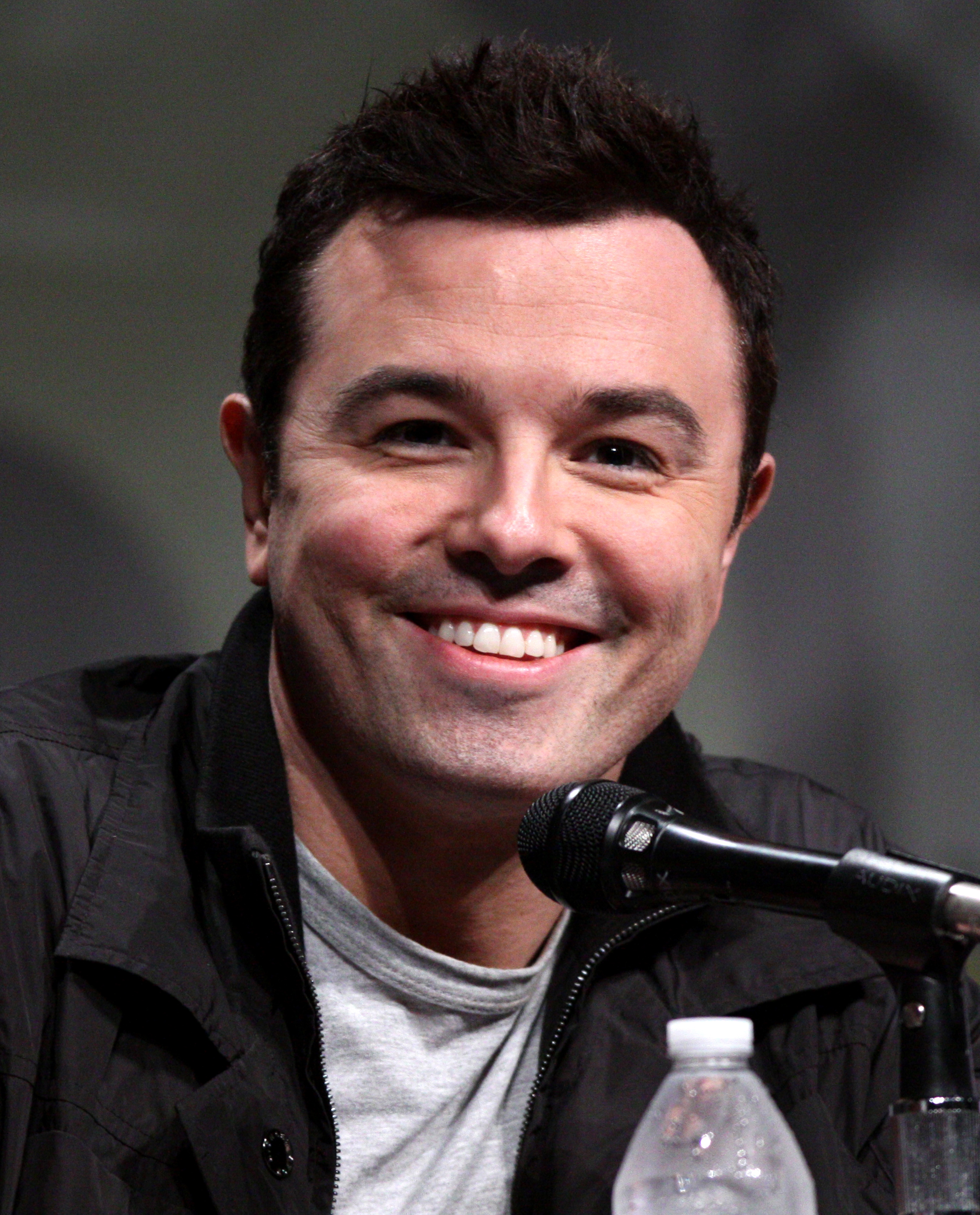
Family Guy and The Orville creator Seth MacFarlane (BFA 1995)

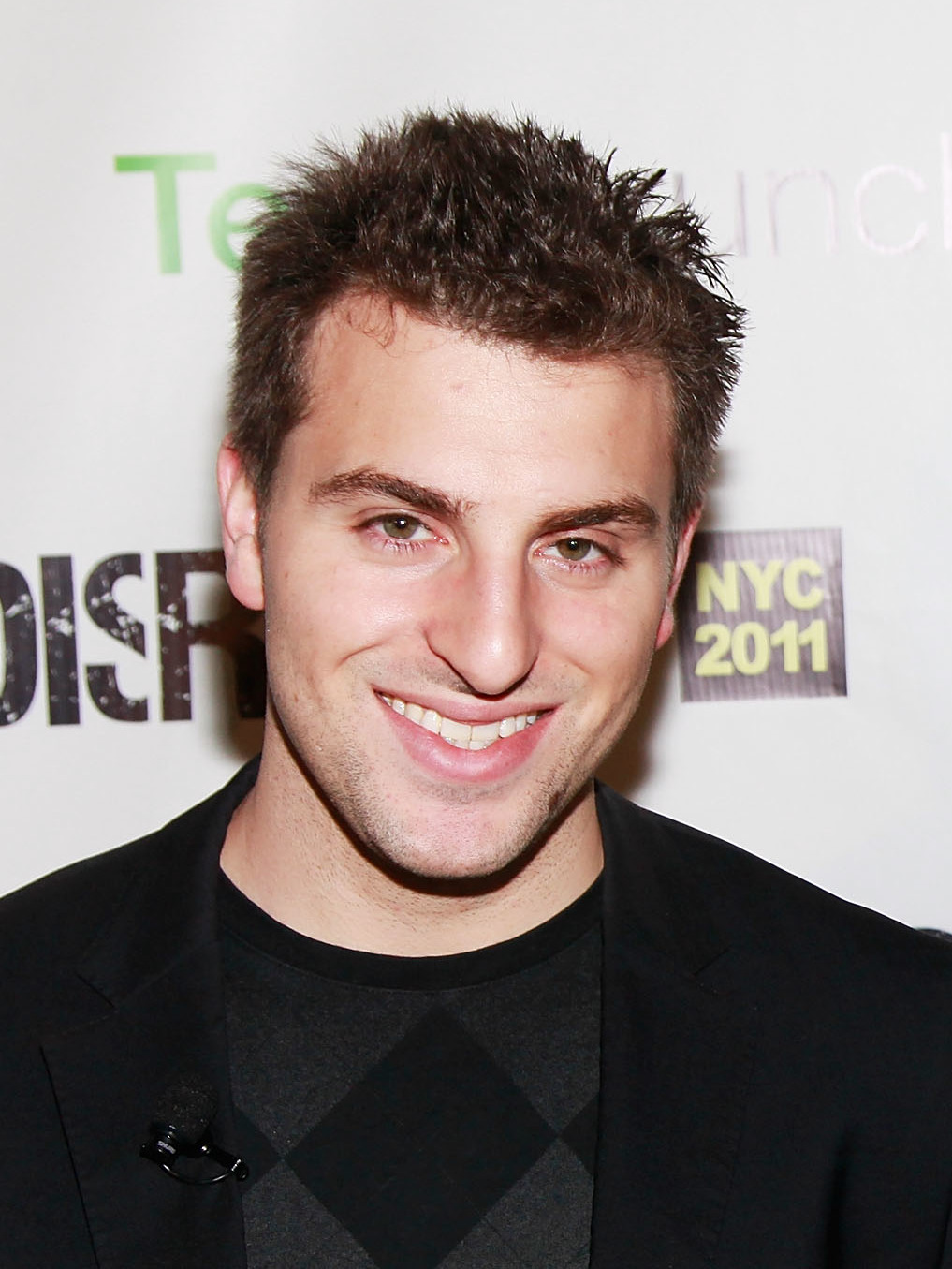
CEO and co-founder of Airbnb, Brian Chesky (BFA 2004)

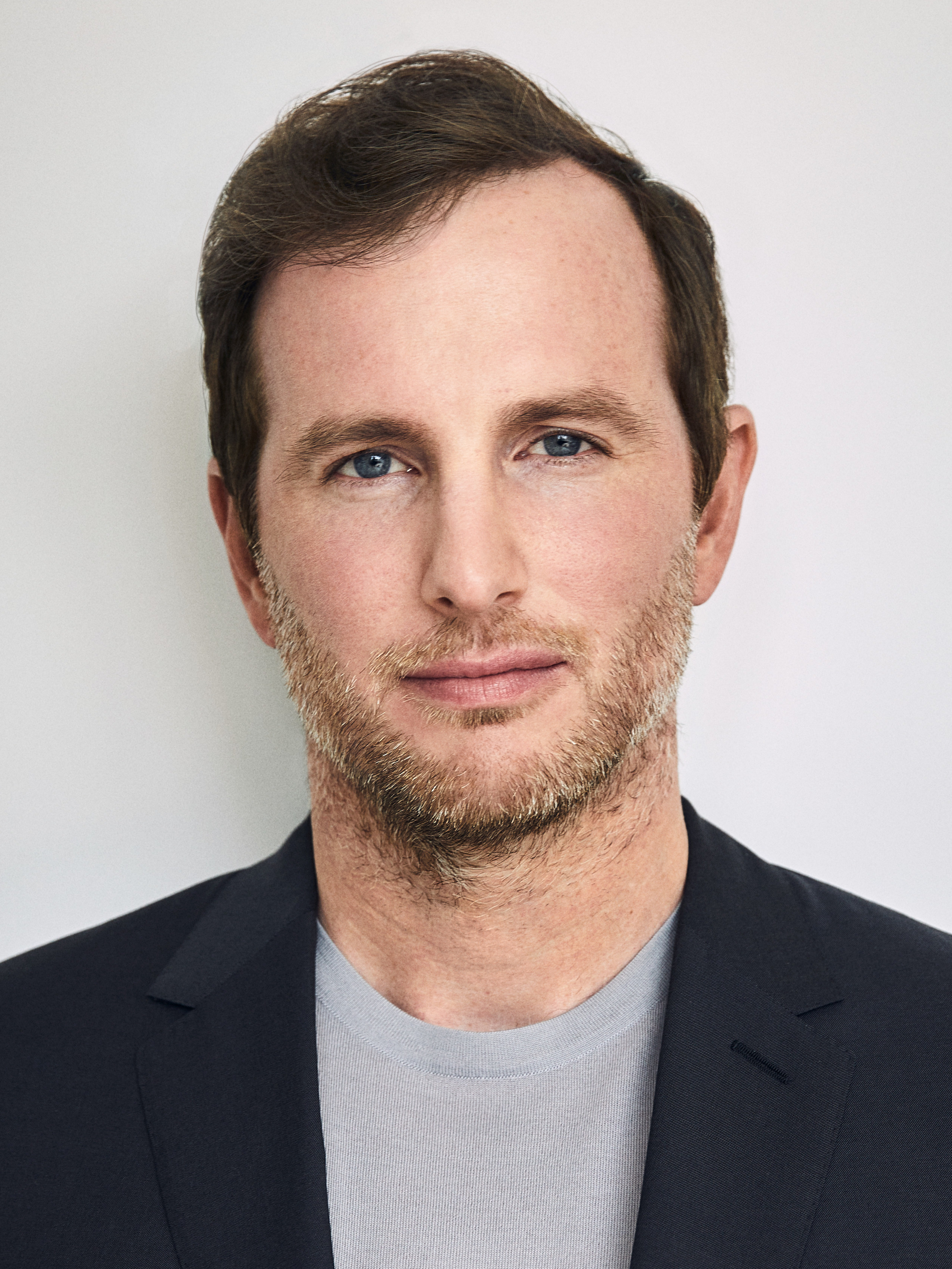
Co-founder of Airbnb, Joe Gebbia (BFA 2005)

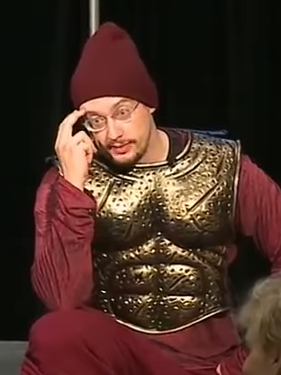
Artist and comedian Sam Hyde (BFA 2007)

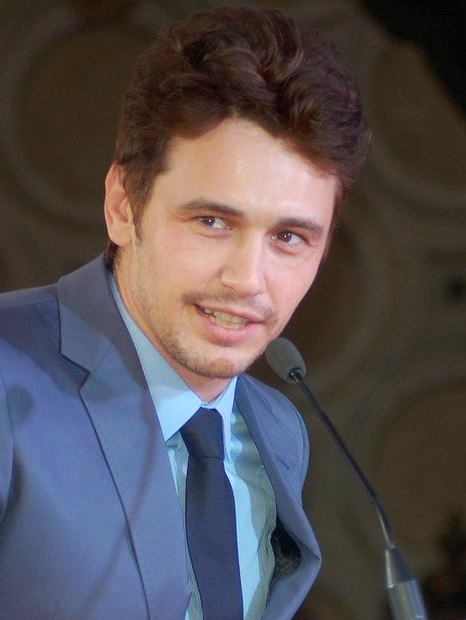
Actor and filmmaker James Franco (MFA 2012)

=== Faculty ===
Notable RISD faculty include photographers Diane Arbus, Aaron Siskind, and Elle Pérez, sculptors Simone Leigh and Dean Snyder, painters Jennifer Packer, Aaron Gilbert, and Angela Dufresne, architect Friedrich St. Florian, designers Victor Papanek and Pierre Kleykamp, and Pulitzer Prize-winning author Jhumpa Lahiri. Rockwell King DuMoulin was a professor and architecture department chair from 1972 to 1978.
