= Crystal Williams =

American college president, educator, poet (born 1970)

Crystal Ann Williams
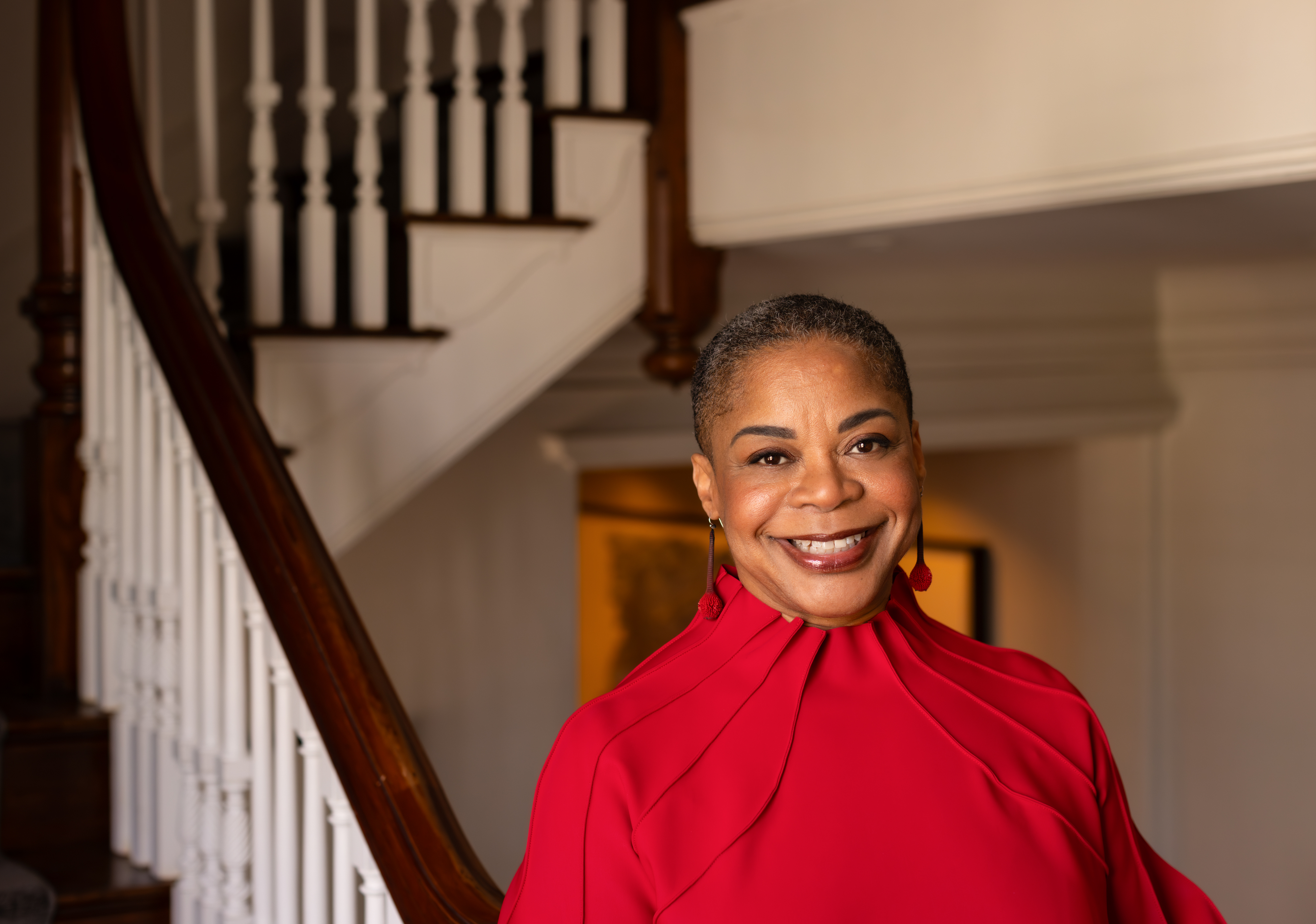
- Williams in 2025 by Jo Sittenfeld

18th President of the Rhode Island School of Design
- Incumbent
- Assumed office 1 April 2022
- Preceded by: Rosanne Somerson

Personal details
- Born: 1970 (age 55–56) Detroit, Michigan, U.S.
- Education: New York University; Cornell University
- Profession: Educator, poet
- Website: www.crystalannwilliams.com

Crystal Ann Williams (born 1970) is an American educator and poet serving as the 18th president of the Rhode Island School of Design (RISD) since 2022.

== Career ==
Williams was raised in both Detroit, Michigan and Madrid, Spain. She earned a BFA at New York University and an MFA in Creative Writing at Cornell University.

=== Education ===
Williams began teaching at Reed College as a professor of English, becoming dean for institutional diversity from 2011 to 2013. From 2013 to 2017, Williams worked at Bates College as the associate vice president for strategic initiatives and as a professor of English. In 2017, Williams came to Boston University, where she first worked as the inaugural associate provost for diversity and inclusion before transferring into a broader role as vice president and associate provost for community and inclusion.

In 2021, it was announced that Williams was leaving her position as vice president and associate provost for community and inclusion at Boston University to become Rhode Island School of Design's 18th president. Williams became its first Black president on April 1, 2022.

On March 17, 2025, RISD students and alumni opened an exhibition at Carr Haus, a student-run café open to the public, in support of Palestine. Four days later, following an online post by StopAntisemitism and "perceived threat of harm," Williams shut down the exhibition. A student with work removed from the show said it "felt like censorship." The premature closure was condemned by the National Coalition Against Censorship, among other community members. Williams has previously threatened students with expulsion for pro-Palestine protest actions.

The previous fall, Williams was profiled in the New York Times, saying of her own creative practice: "Poetry requires a kind of heart space and solitude I don't have."

She received $642,342 in compensation from RISD in 2025.

== Bibliography ==
- Kin, Michigan State University Press, 2000.
- Lunatic, Michigan State University Press, 2002.
- Troubled Tongues, Lotus Press, 2009.
- Detroit as Barn, University of Washington Press, 2014.
