= Senhor Testículo =

Mascot of the Association of Personal Assistance for Cancer

Senhor Testículo (English: Mr. Testicle, or Mr. Ball) is the mascot for the Association of Personal Assistance for Cancer (Associação de Assistência às Pessoas) in Brazil. The mascot is a large anthropomorphic pair of testicles, and is designed to help educate people about testicular cancer.

The non-profit organization that Senhor Testiculo represents described the mascot as "a friendly snowman in the shape of testicles".

== See also ==
- Scrotie – Unofficial mascot of the Rhode Island School of Design
