= Sarah Meiklejohn =

American computer scientist

Sarah Meiklejohn is an American computer scientist.

Meiklejohn led a team at the University of California, San Diego which traced bitcoin by creating maps using blockchain records which could potentially be used to identify specific users.

She is the professor of Cryptography and Security at University College London and an Associate Director of the Initiative for Cryptocurrencies and Contracts (IC3).

== Education ==
She has a MS in Computer Science, a BS in Mathematics from Brown University and a PhD in Computer Science from UC San Diego, after defending her dissertation “Flexible Models for Secure Systems”.
