= Judge Lopez =

Judge Lopez may refer to:

- Enrique López López (born 1963), judge of the Constitutional Court of Spain
- José M. López (judge) (born 1949), associate judge on the Superior Court of the District of Columbia
- Kenia Seoane Lopez (born 1974), associate judge of the Superior Court of the District of Columbia
- Linda Lopez (judge) (born 1968), judge of the United States District Court for the Southern District of California
- Luis Arturo González López (1900–1965), municipal judge in Guatemala
- Maria Lopez (born 1953), Cuban-American judge and television jurist
  - Judge Maria Lopez, American arbitration-based reality court show, presided over by Maria Lopez
- Miguel Félix López (born 1939), judge of the Guayas Superior Court of Justice in Ecuador
- Natividad Almeda-López (1892–1977), judge of the municipal court of Manila
- Susan Lopez (born c. 1976/77), Florida County Court judge

== See also ==
- Justice Lopez (disambiguation)
