= Litigation involving Steele dossier =

Litigation involving political opposition research report regarding the 2016 US election

Multiple lawsuits have been filed in connection with the Steele dossier, primarily involving defamation claims by plaintiffs such as Aleksej Gubarev, the three owners of Alfa-Bank (Mikhail Fridman, Petr Aven, and German Khan), Michael Cohen, Devin Nunes, Giorgi Rtskhiladze, and Carter Page against Christopher Steele, BuzzFeed, Oath, Orbis Business Intelligence, the Democratic National Committee, and others. All of these defamation cases, except one, were dismissed or withdrawn by the plaintiffs.

Carter Page unsuccessfully sought damages in a lawsuit against the United States Department of Justice, the Federal Bureau of Investigation, and several former U.S. government officials, alleging violations of his constitutional rights. Donald Trump also filed unsuccessful lawsuits against Hillary Clinton, Steele, Orbis, and others.

== Gubarev, et al v. BuzzFeed, et al ==
On January 28, 2017, Aleksej Gubarev, chief of technology company XBT and a figure mentioned in the dossier, initiated a defamation lawsuit against BuzzFeed, Inc. and Steele (and his company, Orbis Business Intelligence) in the High Court of Justice in London, Britain, Case No: CR 2017 - 664, after BuzzFeed published the "Steele Dossier," alleging the dossier made "seriously defamatory allegations". At issue was whether Orbis/Steele was responsible for the publication of the "December memorandum" by BuzzFeed, a charge denied by Steele. Steele's lawyers said their client did not intend for the reports to be released, and that one of the reports "needed to be analyzed and further investigated/verified". The defendants said that BuzzFeed's publication of the memorandum was "unauthorized" and they "did not intend the December memorandum or its content to be made public (and) did not provide the December memorandum to BuzzFeed or any other media organization." The Senate Intelligence Committee wrote that "Fusion GPS's work for Perkins Coie ended on Election Day. Steele's final memorandum was completed on December 13, 2016. No one paid for it."

On October 30, 2020, Gubarev lost his libel case when the High Court ruled in Steele's favor. Judge Warby explained that the allegations about Gubarev were indeed defamatory and that their publication "caused serious harm to his reputation", but that Gubarev had failed to prove that Steele was responsible for the publication of the dossier, and that he, therefore, should not pay damages.

== Gubarev v. BuzzFeed ==
On February 3, 2017, Aleksej Gubarev sued BuzzFeed for defamation. The suit, filed in a Broward County, Florida court in the United States, centers on allegations from the dossier that XBT had been "using botnets and porn traffic to transmit viruses, plant bugs, steal data and conduct 'altering operations' against the Democratic Party leadership". BuzzFeed apologized on the evening of February 3 and announced that it had redacted Gubarev's name, and the names of his companies, from the dossier. On February 28, 2017, the case was moved to the United States District Court for the Southern District of Florida on the basis of diversity jurisdiction, Case No. 1:17-cv-60426.

In response to the lawsuit in Florida, BuzzFeed hired the business advisory firm FTI Consulting to investigate the dossier's allegations. BuzzFeed News has sued the DNC in an attempt to force the disclosure of information it believes will bolster its defense against libel allegations. Fusion GPS "has claimed that it did not provide the dossier to BuzzFeed".

On June 30, 2017, BuzzFeed subpoenaed the CIA, the FBI, and the Office of the Director of National Intelligence. They also sought "testimony from fired FBI Director James Comey, as well as former DNI James Clapper and CIA Director John Brennan". They were interested in using the discovery process to get information about the distribution of the dossier, how it had circulated among government officials, and the "existence and scope of the federal government's investigation into the dossier". They hoped "the information could bolster BuzzFeed's claim that publication of the document was protected by the fair report privilege, which can immunize reports based on official government records." On June 4, 2018, Judge Ursula Ungaro ruled that BuzzFeed could claim "fair report privilege" for the publication of the dossier and its accompanying article, bolstering BuzzFeed's defense.

Cyber security and intelligence expert Andrew Weisburd has said both Gubarev and the dossier "can be right": "Their explanation is entirely plausible, as is the Steele Dossier's description of Mr. Gubarev as essentially a victim of predatory officers of one or more Russian intelligence services. ... Neither BuzzFeed nor Steele have accused Gubarev of being a willing participant in wrongdoing."

On December 19, 2018, Judge Ursula Ungaro sided with BuzzFeed in the defamation suit filed by Gubarev in Florida, defending BuzzFeed's privilege to publish and the public's right to know about the allegations against Trump.

== Fridman, et al v. BuzzFeed ==
On May 26, 2017, Mikhail Fridman, Petr Aven, and German Khan—the owners of Alfa-Bank—filed a defamation lawsuit with the New York Supreme Court in New York County (Index No. 154895/2017) against BuzzFeed for publishing the unverified dossier, that describes financial ties and collusion between Putin and the three bank owners. On May 4, 2018, Justice Arlene Bluth denied in part the plaintiffs' motion to dismiss BuzzFeed's affirmative defenses. Plaintiffs lost the appeal. On March 11, 2021, Justice Francis A. Kahn, III dismissed the lawsuit.

== Fridman, et al v. Fusion GPS, et al ==
On October 3, 2017, Fridman, Aven, and Khan also filed a libel suit against Bean LLC (aka Fusion GPS) and Glenn Simpson with the United States District Court for the District of Columbia (Case No. 1:17-cv-02041) for circulating the dossier among journalists and allowing it to be published. The court dismissed the suit for lack of jurisdiction in March 2022.

The three oligarchs dropped their lawsuit against Fusion GPS in March 2022.

== Cohen v. BuzzFeed, et al ==
On January 9, 2018, Michael Cohen sued BuzzFeed News and Fusion GPS for defamation over allegations about him in the dossier. Cohen’s suit against BuzzFeed was filed in New York Supreme Court while the suit against Fusion GPS was filed in the United States District Court for the Southern District of New York. On April 19, 2018, ten days after his home, office, and hotel room were raided by the FBI as part of a criminal investigation, Cohen filed motions to voluntarily withdraw both suits.

== Fridman, et al v. Orbis, et al ==
On April 16, 2018, Alfa-Bank owners Fridman, Aven, and Khan filed a libel suit in the Superior Court of the District of Columbia (No. 18-CV-919) against Steele and Orbis Business Intelligence, since the dossier describes financial ties and collusion between Putin, Trump, and the three bank owners. Steele's lawyers filed two motions to dismiss the case, accusing the three men of intimidation.

On August 20, 2018, Judge Anthony C. Epstein dismissed the case with prejudice in response to a motion by lawyers for Orbis Business Intelligence. Without assessing whether the dossier was "accurate or not accurate", the judge held that Steele was protected by the First Amendment that protects freedom of speech. He also cited the District of Columbia's anti-SLAPP law, which prevents the filing of frivolous suits to silence critics. He also pointed out its importance to the public interest: "The Steele dossier generated so much interest and attention in the US precisely because its contents relate to active public debates here." On June 18, 2020, the District of Columbia Court of Appeal upheld the dismissal of the lawsuit.

== Aven, et al v. Orbis ==
On May 4, 2018, Alfa-Bank partners Petr Aven, Mikhail Fridman, and German Khan brought a lawsuit for defamation in Britain (Case No: QB-2018-006349) against Orbis Business Intelligence, Steele's private intelligence firm. On July 8, 2020, Justice Warby from the Queen's Bench Division of the British High Court of Justice ordered Orbis to pay damages to Aven and Fridman who Steele claimed had delivered "large amounts of illicit cash" to Vladimir Putin when Putin was deputy mayor of St. Petersburg. Judge Warby ruled for the plaintiffs that the Steele's claim was "inaccurate and misleading" and awarded the damages to compensate "for the loss of autonomy, distress and reputational damage caused by the breaches of duty". The judge stated that Steele's dossier also inaccurately claimed that Aven and Fridman provided foreign policy advice to Putin.

== Page v. Democratic National Committee, et al ==
In October 2018, Carter Page sued the DNC, Perkins Coie, and two Perkins Coie partners (NO. CIV-18-1019-HE), for defamation in the United States District Court for the Western District of Oklahoma. The lawsuit was dismissed on January 31, 2019. Page said he intended to appeal the decision.

On January 30, 2020, Page filed another defamation lawsuit (Case: 1:20-cv-00671) against the DNC and Perkins Coie, naming Marc Elias and Michael Sussmann as defendants. The suit was dismissed. Page then appealed the lower court's dismissal to the United States Supreme Court (Case No. 20-2781). In January 2022, the Supreme Court declined to review the defamation lawsuit.

== Nunes v. Fusion GPS, et al ==
On September 4, 2019, Devin Nunes filed a racketeering lawsuit in the United States District Court for the Eastern District of Virginia (Case No.1:19-CV-01148) against Fusion GPS seeking $10 million in damages. He accused them of harassment and impeding his investigation into Fusion GPS's role in raising suspicions about Trump's ties to Russian interference in the 2016 campaign. The suit was dismissed on February 21, 2020. Nunes then filed an amended complaint which allowed the suit to continue. This was the third amended complaint filed since September 2019. On March 31, 2021, the court dismissed the claim "with prejudice" and a warning that "litigation 'asserted in bad faith or for the purpose of harassment' may be met with sanctions".

== Rtskhiladze v. Mueller ==
On June 17, 2020, Giorgi Rtskhiladze sued Robert Mueller and the Department of Justice (DOJ) in the United States District Court for the District of Columbia (Case No. 20-cv-1591) for defamation related to the mention of Rtskhiladze in "Footnote 112" in the Mueller report. Rtskhiladze is a U.S. citizen who was born in the Republic of Georgia, a former Soviet republic, who emigrated to the U.S. in 1991. He sought "$100 million in damages and an injunction that would force the DOJ to hastily remove all future references to him in the Mueller Report". The suit was dismissed on September 1, 2021.

Rtskhiladze claims that he was falsely identified as a "Russian businessman", rather than a "Georgian", in the footnote, and he also objected to the fact that the Mueller report dropped the original word "some" from a quote. In his original text to Michael Cohen on October 30, 2016, "Rtskhiladze indicated that he had stopped the 'flow of some tapes from Russia.'"

Cohen was deposed by the House Intelligence Committee, and he provided a history of the alleged tapes. Rtskhiladze told him the tapes were "the infamous pee tape when Mr. Trump was in Moscow for the Miss Universe Pageant". Cohen testified he became aware of the tape in "late 2013 or early 2014, shortly after the Miss Universe 2013 pageant and significantly prior to the 2016 U.S. election cycle" and told Trump about the rumor at that time. He had then asked Rtskhiladze for help: "In 2014 or 2015 Cohen asked a friend, Giorgi Rtskhiladze, to find out if the tape was real," and on October 30, 2016, Rtskhiladze contacted Cohen with news that he had succeeded in stopping the tapes.

When Representative Jackie Speier asked Cohen: "It wasn't infamous then, was it?" he replied: "Yes, yes. That the tape - the conversation about the tape has gone back almost a couple months past when they were there for the Miss Universe Pageant that that tape existed." (p. 227) When Speier asked "So you're suggesting you've known about the rumors about this tape for many years before October 30th?" he replied that he had talked to "many people" about the pee tape over the years.

Rtskhiladze later changed his previous testimony to Mueller by claiming that the tapes were "fake", but District Judge Christopher R. Cooper cast doubt on that claim:

As for Rtskhiladze's professed belief that the tapes were fake, that suggestion is somewhat undercut by Rtskhiladze's statement, only present in the Senate Report, suggesting that the tapes may have been real, and that they were 'what happens when you visit crocus I guess.'

=== Case reopened ===
Giorgi Rtskhiladze v. Robert Mueller, III, et al, D.C. Cir., No. 21-5243, 8/9/24

On August 9, 2024, the case was reopened and remanded to the District Court after three judges from the U.S. Court of Appeals for the D.C. Circuit found that Rtskhiladze had a right to seek redress for the "ongoing injury" caused by the original wording in the Mueller report. Judge Justin Walker wrote:

Congress neither speaks for DOJ, nor speaks infallibly. Either way, a court could redress the ongoing injury by ordering DOJ to correct the Mueller Report... The decision partially reverses a 2021 ruling by US District Judge Christopher Cooper that dismissed Rtskhiladze's lawsuit, and sends the case back for the trial court to consider the merits of his claims.

While recognizing his right to seek redress about the wording, the appeals court upheld the original dismissal of Rtskhiladze's damages claim and denial of access to his grand jury testimony.

== Page v. Comey, et al ==
On November 27, 2020, Carter Page filed a $75 million suit in the United States District Court for the District of Columbia (Case No. 1:20-cv-03460) against the United States, DOJ, FBI, and several former leading officials for the "defendants' multiple violations of his Constitutional and other legal rights in connection with unlawful surveillance and investigation of him by the United States Government." The defendants included James Comey, Andrew McCabe, Kevin Clinesmith, Peter Strzok, Lisa Page, Joe Pientka III, Stephen Soma, and Brian J. Auten.

The suit was dismissed on September 1, 2022, by United States District Court judge Dabney L. Friedrich, who wrote:

To the extent these allegations are true, there is little question that many individual defendants, as well as the agency as a whole, engaged in wrongdoing. Even so, Page has brought no actionable claim against any individual defendant or against the United States.

== Page v. Oath, Inc., et al ==
On February 11, 2021, Carter Page lost a defamation suit he had filed in the Delaware Superior Court (Case No. C.A. No. S20C-07-030) against Oath, Inc. (Yahoo! News and HuffPost) for their articles that described his activities mentioned in the Steele dossier. The Superior Court judge wrote: "The article simply says that U.S. intelligence agencies were investigating reports of plaintiff's meetings with Russian officials, which Plaintiff admits is true".

Page's suit targeted Oath for 11 articles, especially one written by Michael Isikoff and published by Yahoo! News in September 2016. In dismissing the case, the Superior Court judge noted that "Page's arguments regarding Isikoff's description of the dossier and Steele were 'either sophistry or political spin.'" He also said that Page "failed to allege actual malice by any of the authors, and that the three articles written by HuffPost employees were true". Page was represented by attorneys John Pierce and L. Lin Wood, who was denied permission to represent Page because of his actions in the attempts to overturn the 2020 United States presidential election in favor of President Donald Trump.

In January 2022, the Delaware Supreme Court upheld the decision of the Superior Court. Delaware Supreme Court Chief Justice Collins J. Seitz Jr. said: "the article at the crux of the case—by Yahoo News reporter Michael Isikoff—was either completely truthful or, 'at a minimum,' conveyed a true 'gist,' even if it included some 'minor' or 'irrelevant' incorrect statements." Bloomberg Law reported that "the court dismissed as far-fetched Page's theories about a conspiracy among interconnected media and political figures to tarnish Trump by concocting the Russia investigation from thin air."

On May 16, 2022, the United States Supreme Court declined to review the appeal filed by Page.

== Trump v. Clinton, et al ==
On March 24, 2022, Trump filed a RICO lawsuit in the US District Court for the Southern District of Florida (Case No. 2:2022cv14102) against Clinton, Steele, and many others. The case was dismissed on September 8, 2022. The judge wrote that "despite the numerous references to [Steele] in Trump's lawsuit, 'none specifically attribute any false statement about Plaintiff to him'". Trump was ordered to pay roughly $1 million "because the case should never have been brought to begin with". In February 2024, Trump filed an appeal (24-12311) asking the "11th Circuit to toss the costly sanctions against him". The appeal was voluntarily withdrawn Feb 11, 2025.

== Trump v. Orbis Business Intelligence ==
In October 2023, Trump filed an unsuccessful lawsuit in London (Case No. KB-2022-004403) against Orbis and Steele (who was later removed from the suit) alleging that Orbis violated British data protection laws when compiling the dossier. Trump accepted "that the Defendant is not responsible in law for the publication of the Memoranda by BuzzFeed".

Trump alleged Steele made "'shocking and scandalous claims' that were false and harmed his reputation". Trump's witness statement said: "I can confirm that I did not, at any time engage in perverted sexual behaviour including the hiring of prostitutes to engage in 'golden showers' in the presidential suite of a hotel in Moscow." Trump asserted "The inaccurate personal data in the Dossier has, and continues, to cause me significant damage and distress."

On February 1, 2024, the High Court of Justice in London sided with Orbis and dismissed Trump's claim stating that the filing was outside the six-year period of limitations and the case was "bound to fail". In March 2024, Trump was ordered to pay legal fees of £300,000 ($382,000) to Orbis.

Trump's appeal was denied on March 30, 2024. On June 7, 2024, Sky News reported that Trump had not yet paid those legal costs, and that he had been in breach of the order for two months. Before the hearing, he paid a $12,700 security payment that was later transferred to Steele.

At a January 2025 hearing, it was reported that Trump had "decided not to pay" the judgment. That refusal "led to him being prevented from taking part in a three-day hearing to decide the size of the total legal bill", and in April 2025 he was ordered to pay £626,000 (about $821,500) in legal costs, an increase from the original £300,000.

On September 11, 2025, legal papers were served at Trump's Scottish golf courses, the Trump Turnberry and the Menie course in Aberdeenshire:

On Thursday, Orbis said it was now seeking more than £680,000. It said it had initiated the latest enforcement action because of Trump’s 'failure to comply with orders issued against him' by the courts.

On September 17, 2026, a procedural hearing was held, at Ayr Sheriff Court, as to whether the monies personally owed by Donald Trump could be recovered from the Golf courses, the case was adjourned till November 2026.
