= Rainey R. Brandt =

American judge (born 1966)

Rainey Brandt
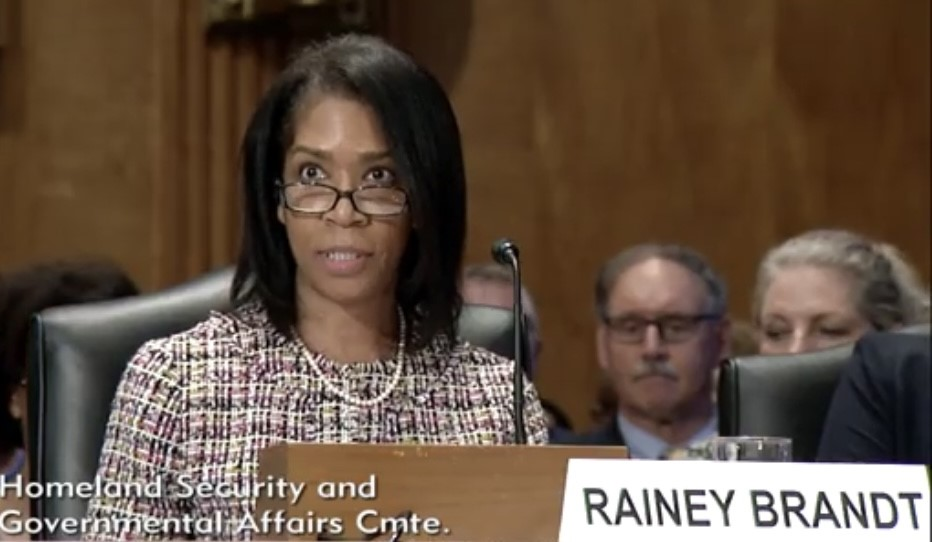

Associate Judge of the Superior Court of the District of Columbia
- Incumbent
- Assumed office September 16, 2019
- Nominated by: Donald Trump
- Preceded by: Judith Nan Macaluso

Magistrate Judge of the Superior Court of the District of Columbia
- In office November 7, 2012 – September 16, 2019

Personal details
- Born: Rainey Eloise Ransom; March 12, 1966 (age 60) LaGrange, Georgia, U.S.
- Spouse: Robert W. Brandt
- Education: American University (BA, MS, PhD); Columbus School of Law (JD)

Rainey Ransom Brandt (born March 12, 1966) is an associate judge on the Superior Court of the District of Columbia.

== Education ==
Brandt received her Bachelor of Arts, Master of Science, and Doctor of Philosophy degrees from American University. She earned her Juris Doctor from Columbus School of Law at the Catholic University of America in 1995.

In 1996, she served as law clerk to Judge Michael Rankin and later to Judge Stephanie Duncan-Peters.

== Academic career ==
Prior to becoming a judge, Brandt was a professor in the Department of Justice, Law, and Criminology at American University. She continues to serve as an adjunct associate professor at American University, where her areas of research include the prison system and criminal justice. Brandt's dissertation was about the effects of incarceration on the father-child relationship.

== D.C. Superior Court ==
On November 7, 2012, Brandt was sworn in as a Magistrate Judge of the Superior Court of the District of Columbia.

On March 21, 2012, President Barack Obama nominated Brandt to the seat vacated by Judge Joan Z. McAvoy who retired; that nomination was returned January 3, 2013. She was renominated on November 15, 2016, to the seat vacated by Judge Lee F. Satterfield; that nomination was returned on January 3, 2017.

President Donald Trump nominated her on September 7, 2017, to the same court to the seat vacated by Judith N. Macaluso. Her nomination expired on January 4, 2019. On March 11, 2019, President Trump renominated Brandt to the same seat on the court. The Senate confirmed her nomination on August 1, 2019, by voice vote. She was sworn in on September 16, 2019. Her official investiture ceremony took place on January 10, 2020.

== Personal life ==
Brandt lives in Washington, D.C., with her husband Robert W. Brandt, a chief with the U.S. Marshals Service.
