= Danya Dayson =

American judge (born 1972)

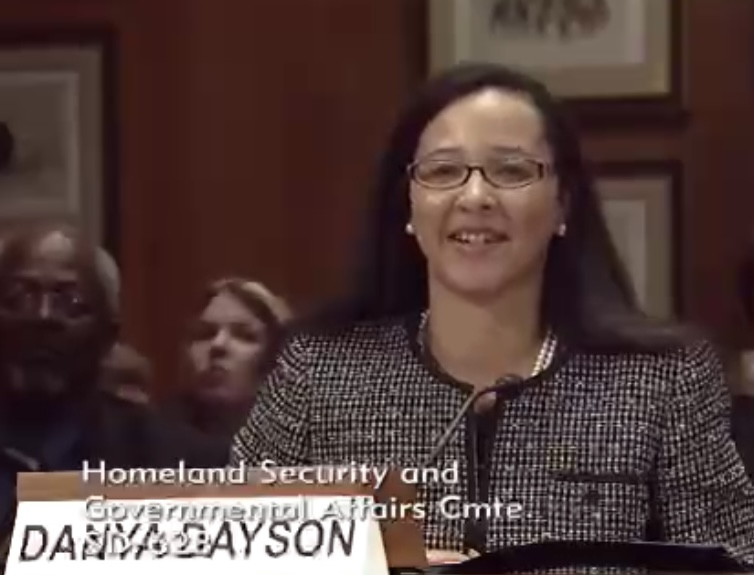

Associate Judge of the Superior Court of the District of Columbia
- Incumbent
- Assumed office April 27, 2012
- President: Barack Obama
- Preceded by: Stephanie Duncan-Peters

Personal details
- Born: Danya Ariel Swinson; October 1, 1972 (age 53) New York City, New York, U.S.
- Spouse: Michael Murphy
- Education: Appalachian State University (BA); Georgetown University (JD)

Danya Ariel Dayson (born October 1, 1972) is an associate judge of the Superior Court of the District of Columbia.

== Education and career ==
Dayson earned her Bachelor of Arts from Appalachian State University and her Juris Doctor from Georgetown University Law Center.

After graduating, she clerked for Judge Robert E. Morin. She then worked in private practice.

=== D.C. superior court ===
President Barack Obama nominated Dayson on July 11, 2011, to a 15-year term as an associate judge of the Superior Court of the District of Columbia to the seat vacated by Stephanie Duncan-Peters. On November 8, 2011, the Senate Committee on Homeland Security and Governmental Affairs held a hearing on her nomination and on the following day, November 9, 2011, the Committee reported her nomination favorably to the senate floor. On November 18, 2011, the full Senate confirmed her nomination by voice vote. She was sworn in on April 27, 2012.

== Personal life ==
Dayson was born in New York City, raised in Chapel Hill, North Carolina and has lived in Washington, D.C. since 1994. She is married to Michael Murphy and has one child.
