= Krauthammer =

Krauthammer or Krauthamer is a surname. Notable people with the surname include:

- Charles Krauthammer (1950–2018), American political columnist
- Mandy Krauthammer Cohen, American health official
- Peter A. Krauthamer (born 1957), American judge
- Robert Andrzej Krauthammer, birth name of Polish-British pianist André Tchaikowsky (1935–1982)
