= Imran Awan =

Pakistani-American information technology worker

- Born: Shahid Imran Awan; 1979 (age 46–47); Pakistan
- Education: Johns Hopkins University (BS)
- Criminal charges: Bank fraud; Making false statements; Unlawful monetary transactions

Shahid Imran Awan (born 1979) is a Pakistani-American information technology worker. From 2004 to 2017, he worked as a shared employee for Democrats in the U.S. House of Representatives.

In July 2017, Awan was arrested on federal bank fraud charges. During an 18-month investigation into alleged misconduct involving congressional computer equipment, he was subject to conspiracy theories involving espionage. On July 3, 2018, federal prosecutors concluded their investigation, "publicly debunking allegations" that Awan "was a Pakistani operative who stole government secrets with cover from House Democrats". On July 3, 2018, Awan pleaded guilty to having made a false representation on a home equity line of credit application. On August 21, 2018, U.S. District Judge Tanya Chutkan sentenced Awan to time served and three months of supervision.

== Biography ==
Awan was born in Pakistan in 1980. He won a green card for himself and his family in the green card lottery when he was 14. After emigrating to the U.S. in 1997, Awan worked at a fast-food restaurant while attending community college, then transferred to Johns Hopkins University where he earned a degree in information technology. He became a U.S. citizen in 2004 and resided in Lorton, Virginia.

Awan started working on Capitol Hill in January 2004 as an information technology director for Robert Wexler. His wife Hina Alvi, his two brothers, a sister-in-law, and two friends also worked as congressional information technology staffers. Awan worked as a shared employee, providing technical support for 25 other House Democrats.

== Allegations of wrongdoing ==
=== Alleged equipment theft ===
In March 2016, House auditors noticed some purchases for computer equipment were broken into multiple parts below $500, and left off the House inventory. Some of this equipment was delivered to the Awan brothers' house.

On February 2, 2017, the Sergeant-at-Arms briefed top staffers for members of Congress that the U.S. Capitol Police were conducting an active criminal investigation into the actions of five House IT employees — four men and a woman — who were being investigated allegations of procurement scam and violating the House IT network rules. Subsequently, it was also revealed to the general public that there was an ongoing investigation. These five employees were barred from the computer networks at the House of Representatives.

Later Awan, his wife, Hina Alvi, his two brothers and his friend were named as the five IT staffers being investigated. Given the suspected violations, most of the congress members terminated Awan's services; Democratic Congresswoman Debbie Wasserman Schultz from Florida, however, continued to employ Awan in an advisory role.

On March 5, 2017, the FBI and Capitol Police stopped Awan's wife, Hina Alvi, at Washington Dulles International Airport. They allowed her and her three children to get on the flight to Lahore.

A government investigation led by U.S. Attorney Jessie K. Liu included forensic analysis of computer equipment and data, as well as interviews with about 40 witnesses. The investigation addressed various right-wing conspiracy theories about Awan, concluding that it had "found no evidence that [Awan] illegally removed House data from the House network or from House Members' offices, stole the House Democratic Caucus Server, stole or destroyed House information technology equipment, or improperly accessed or transferred government information, including classified or sensitive information." The investigation found no evidence of ties between Awan and a foreign intelligence agency targeting Congress, or between Awan and an alleged criminal ring that stole equipment from Democratic lawmakers. The investigators stated, "the government has uncovered no evidence that [Imran Awan] violated federal law with respect to the House computer system".

=== Bank fraud court case ===
On July 24, 2017, the FBI and U.S. Capitol Police arrested Awan at Washington Dulles International Airport. He had previously purchased a ticket to Lahore, Pakistan, with a return flight in January 2018. Awan was arraigned the following day and pleaded not guilty to one count of bank fraud. He was ordered to surrender his passports, abide by a curfew, and wear a GPS device. Wasserman-Schultz fired Awan on July 25 after learning about his arrest.

On August 17, 2017, a federal grand jury, convened in U.S. District Court in the District of Columbia, indicted Awan and his wife on four counts, including conspiracy, making false statements, bank fraud, and unlawful monetary transactions. They were charged with conspiring to obtain home equity loans for $165,000 and $120,000 from the Wright Patman Congressional Federal Credit Union in Oakton, Virginia and transferring the money to Pakistan. In January 2017 the couple had wired $283,000 from Alvi's credit union checking account to two people in Faisalabad. The indictment made no mention of an investigation related to procurement theft.

On September 1, 2017, Awan pleaded not guilty to all of these charges. The investigation concluded in early July 2018 with Awan pleading guilty to making a false statement on a bank loan application. Awan had filed a loan application in the name of his wife, Hina Alvi, with a property as equity, but falsely claimed that the property in question was Alvi's primary residence when it was in fact being rented out by Alvi. Awan's attorney said that Awan made the false statement in order to obtain the loan quickly so that he could quickly transfer money to relatives in Pakistan to help his father, who was gravely ill and living in Virginia. On August 21, 2018, District Judge Tanya S. Chutkan sentenced Awan to his time served, plus three months of supervision.

=== Subject of conservative conspiracy theories ===
Throughout the government investigation, some conservative media outlets, most notably The Daily Caller, spread allegations and conspiracy theories about Awan. These outlets alleged that Awan had had unauthorized access to classified government data, and that he had provided to the Pakistani government and/or leaked some of that information. This included the hacking of the Democratic National Committee server in 2015 and 2016, for which the U.S. intelligence community concluded Russia was responsible. Luke Rosiak, who led The Daily Caller's coverage of Awan, stated in April 2018 that the affair was "straight out of James Bond." The coverage often included reports on Awan's personal finances, his business dealings, and family disputes.

President Donald Trump called for Awan to be investigated for espionage in several posts on Twitter, including one in April 2018 when he referred to Awan as the "Pakistani mystery man", and another in June 2018 when he wrote, "Our Justice Department must not let Awan & Debbie Wasserman Schultz off the hook." Days after Awan was cleared of espionage accusations, Trump mentioned the conspiracy theory during a press conference with Vladimir Putin at a summit in Helsinki, asking "what happened to the servers of the Pakistani gentleman that worked on the DNC?" Trump had been asked if he believed Putin or American intelligence regarding 2016 election interference. The judge who sentenced Awan in the bank fraud case criticized these conspiracy theories, calling them "an unbelievable onslaught of scurrilous media attacks to which he and his family have been subjected," adding there had been "accusations lobbed at him from the highest branches of the government, all of which have been proved to be without foundation by the FBI and the Department of Justice."

In January 2020, Awan and four associates filed a lawsuit against Rosiak, The Daily Caller and Regnery Publishing in the Superior Court of the District of Columbia alleging defamation and unjust enrichment. In an interview with The Daily Beast, Awan accused these conservative outlets of essentially destroying his life, and said he believed he was targeted because he was a Muslim immigrant.
