= Sean C. Staples =

American judge (born 1969)

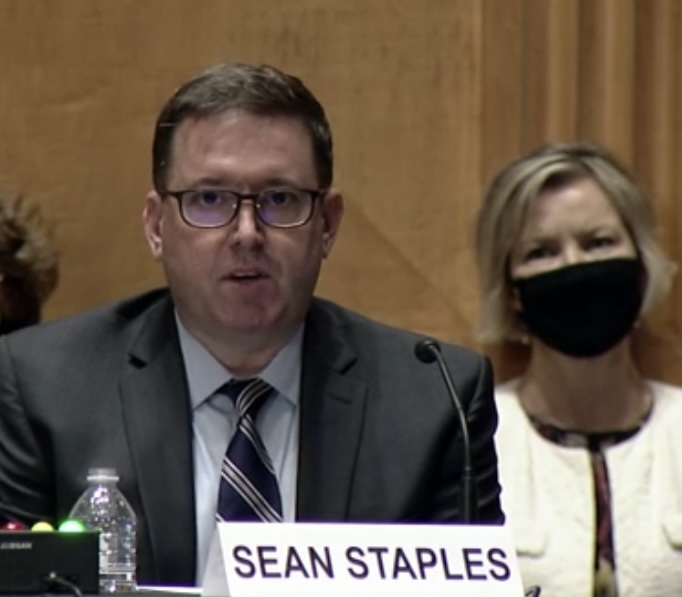

Associate Judge of the Superior Court of the District of Columbia
- Incumbent
- Assumed office February 25, 2022
- Appointed by: Joe Biden
- Preceded by: Lee F. Satterfield

Magistrate judge of the Superior Court of the District of Columbia
- In office December 2013 – February 2022
- Appointed by: Lee F. Satterfield

Personal details
- Born: Sean Curtis Staples; April 11, 1969 (age 56) Poughkeepsie, New York, U.S.
- Education: Syracuse University (BS); Catholic University of America (JD)

Sean Curtis Staples (born April 11, 1969) is an American lawyer who has served as an associate judge of the Superior Court of the District of Columbia since 2022. He previously served as a magistrate judge of the same court from 2013 to 2022.

== Early life and education ==
Staples was raised in New York. He received his Bachelor of Science from Syracuse University in 1991 and his Juris Doctor from the Catholic University of America Columbus School of Law in 1996.

== Career ==
Staples served as a law clerk for Judge Robert E. Morin of the Superior Court of the District of Columbia from 1998 to 1999. From 2000 to 2006, he was a clinical professor in the Criminal Division of the D.C. Law Students in Court Program, supervising law students in the representation of adults and juveniles in D.C. Superior Court. From 2006 to 2013, he was an attorney with the Children’s Law Center, last serving as the Guardian ad Litem Project Director. He previously served as assistant public defender in Fairfax, Virginia. He was appointed to be a magistrate judge by chief judge Lee F. Satterfield in December 2013. He has been assigned to the Criminal and Domestic Violence Divisions on the Superior Court of the District of Columbia.

=== D.C. Superior Court service ===
On June 30, 2021, President Joe Biden announced his intent to nominate Staples to serve as a Judge of the Superior Court of the District of Columbia. On July 13, 2021, his nomination was sent to the Senate. President Biden nominated Staples to the seat vacated by Judge Lee F. Satterfield, whose term expired on February 1, 2017. On September 14, 2021, a hearing on his nomination was held before the Senate Homeland Security and Governmental Affairs Committee. On October 6, 2021, his nomination was reported out of committee by a voice vote. On February 1, 2022, the Senate invoked cloture on his nomination in a 55–38 vote. On February 2, 2022, his nomination was confirmed by a 59–38 vote. He was sworn in on February 25, 2022.

Legal offices
| Preceded by Lee F. Satterfield | Judge of the Superior Court of the District of Columbia; 2022–present | Incumbent |
