= Tanya Chutkan =

American judge (born 1962)

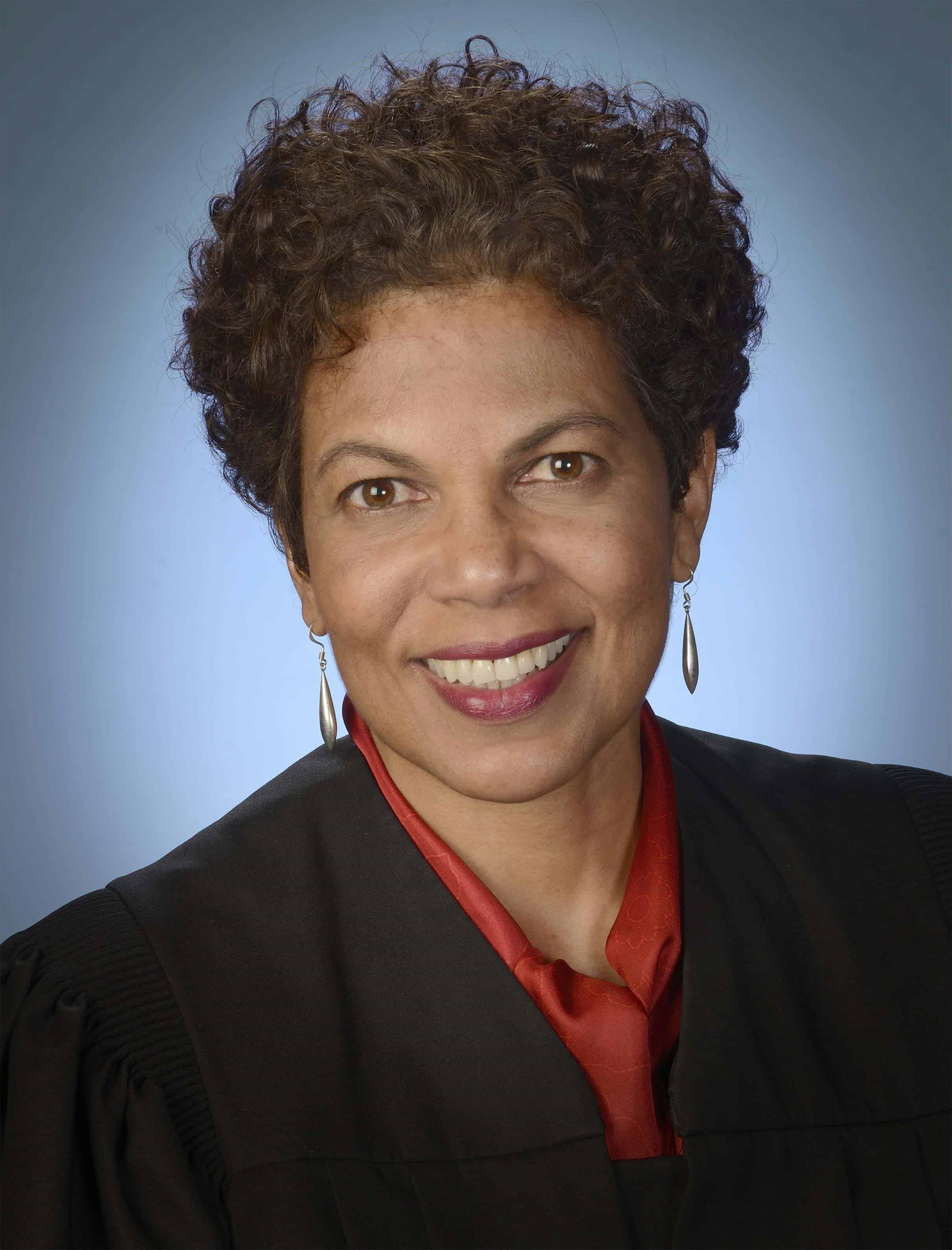

Judge of the United States District Court for the District of Columbia
- Incumbent
- Assumed office June 5, 2014
- Appointed by: Barack Obama
- Preceded by: Seat established

Personal details
- Born: Tanya Sue Chutkan; 1962 (age 63–64) Kingston, Jamaica
- Children: 2
- Education: George Washington University (BA); University of Pennsylvania (JD)

Tanya Sue Chutkan (born 1962) is an American lawyer and jurist serving as a United States district judge of the United States District Court for the District of Columbia. She was appointed in 2014 by President Barack Obama.

She was the presiding judge over the criminal trial of then-former U.S. president Donald Trump over his alleged attempts to overturn the result of the 2020 presidential election, including the events leading up to the attack on the United States Capitol on January 6, 2021. The case never went to trial and was dismissed without prejudice after Trump won the 2024 presidential election.

== Early life and education ==
Chutkan was born in 1962 in Kingston, Jamaica. Chutkan has a younger brother, Norman, and a younger sister, Robynne, both of whom are physicians. She is of Dougla descent. Her father Winston Chutkan is an Indo-Jamaican doctor, and her mother Noelle is an Afro-Jamaican who was one of the leading dancers at the National Dance Theatre Company of Jamaica. Noelle is the daughter of Frank Hill, one of the members of the People's National Party. Through her mother, Chutkan is a cousin of former Liverpool and England footballer John Barnes.

Chutkan received a Bachelor of Arts degree in 1983 from George Washington University. She later attended the University of Pennsylvania Law School, where she was an associate editor of the University of Pennsylvania Law Review. She graduated in 1987 with a Juris Doctor.

== Early career ==
From 1987 to 1990, Chutkan was in private practice at the law firm Hogan & Hartson (now Hogan Lovells). From 1990 to 1991, she worked at the law firm of Donovan, Leisure, Rogovin, Huge & Schiller. From 1991 to 2002, she was a trial attorney and supervisor at the Public Defender Service for the District of Columbia. In 2002, Chutkan joined the law firm of Boies, Schiller & Flexner, becoming a partner in 2007. Her practice focused on complex civil litigation and specifically antitrust class action cases.

== Federal judicial service ==
On December 19, 2013, President Barack Obama nominated Chutkan as a United States district judge of the United States District Court for the District of Columbia to a seat created pursuant to 104 Stat. 5089. She received a hearing before the United States Senate Judiciary Committee on February 25, 2014. On March 27, 2014, her nomination was reported out of committee by a voice vote. On June 3, 2014, the United States Senate invoked cloture on her nomination by a 54–40 vote. On June 4, 2014, her nomination was confirmed by a 95–0 vote. She received her judicial commission on June 5, 2014.

=== Notable cases ===
In February 2017, Public.Resource.Org was sued by the American Society for Testing and Materials, the National Fire Protection Association, the American Society of Heating, Refrigerating and Air Conditioning Engineers, and other entities for scanning and making available building codes and fire codes which these organizations consider their copyrighted property. Chutkan ruled against Public.Resource.Org, ordering all of the standards to be deleted from the Internet. Public.Resource.Org appealed her ruling to the D.C. Circuit, which reversed and remanded her decision in 2018, holding that the fair use doctrines had been improperly applied. In March 2022, Chutkan issued a new ruling that would allow Public.Resource.Org to reproduce 184 standards under fair use, partially reproduce 1 standard, and deny reproduction of 32 standards that were found to differ in substantive ways from those incorporated by law; ASTM et al. has since appealed again to the D.C. Circuit.

In summer 2017, Chutkan presided over the Imran Awan and Hina Alvi fraud case.

In Garza v. Hargan (2017), Chutkan ordered the Office of Refugee Resettlement to allow a girl in its care to have an abortion. That ruling was vacated by a panel of the D.C. Circuit, reinstated by the full en banc D.C. Circuit, and ultimately mooted by the U.S. Supreme Court. In December 2017, Chutkan granted relief to two additional pregnant minors who sued seeking access to abortion services while in ORR custody. In March 2018, Chutkan certified a class action and ordered ORR to provide access to abortions to all minors in their custody.

On June 8, 2018, Chutkan blocked until June 20 the release in Syrian Democratic Forces-controlled territory of a dual-nationality Saudi-American citizen alleged to have joined ISIL. The man, who is now held for nine months in Iraq, was planned to be released by the U.S. military – with a new cell phone, some food and water and $4,210 in cash, and his Professional Association of Diving Instructors (PADI) identification card, as soon as the next day.

On March 7, 2019, Chutkan ruled that U.S. Secretary of Education Betsy DeVos illegally delayed the implementation of the "Equity in IDEA" regulations. These regulations updated how states calculate racial disparities in the identification of children as being eligible for special education, the placement of children in restrictive classroom settings, and the use exclusionary discipline. Chutkan also ruled that the U.S. Department of Education violated the law concerning the spread of regulations by neglecting to provide a "reasoned explanation" for the delay, and failing to account for the costs that child, parents, and society would bear.

On April 26, 2019, Chutkan sentenced Maria Butina to 18 months in prison for conspiring to be an unregistered agent of the Russian government in the United States.

On November 20, 2019, Chutkan issued a preliminary injunction against the U.S. Department of Justice, finding that federal inmates sentenced to death were likely to succeed in arguing that the federal government's new lethal injection procedure – which uses a single drug, pentobarbital, rather than the three-drug combination previously in place – "exceeds statutory authority" under the Federal Death Penalty Act. Chutkan's order was later reversed by a divided panel of the U.S. Court of Appeals for the D.C. Circuit, and the case went to the U.S. Supreme Court. The reversal of the injunction was upheld and thirteen federal inmates were executed.

On November 9, 2021, Chutkan denied former President Donald Trump's motion to keep records from being released to the House Select Committee investigating the attack on the Capitol on January 6, 2021. The D.C. Circuit affirmed that decision, and the U.S. Supreme Court declined review.

Chutkan has overseen the trials of more than 30 defendants in cases related to the January 6 Capitol attack. According to The Washington Post, she has been the toughest sentencing judge in those cases, ordering at least some jail or prison time in all cases, and sometimes exceeding the sentence recommended by prosecutors.

As of August 1, 2023, Chutkan was the judge overseeing Trump's criminal trial over his attempts to overturn the results of the 2020 presidential election, culminating in the events leading up to the January 6 Capitol attack.

=== 2025 DOGE ruling ===
In a ruling on February 18, 2025, Chutkan declined to issue a temporary restraining order that would have blocked the "Department of Government Efficiency" (DOGE), led by Elon Musk under President Donald Trump’s administration, from accessing federal employee data or making personnel changes. This decision came in response to a lawsuit filed by fourteen Democratic-led states seeking to limit DOGE’s authority. Chutkan determined that the states failed to prove "imminent, irreparable harm," a necessary legal threshold for such an emergency injunction, though she acknowledged their broader concerns about Musk’s unchecked power and the constitutionality of his role as legitimate questions for future litigation.

== Personal life ==
Her ex-husband, Peter A. Krauthamer, served as a judge on the Superior Court of the District of Columbia from 2012 to 2023. They have two sons.

Chutkan donated $1,500 to Barack Obama's campaign between 2008 and 2009.

On January 7, 2024, Chutkan was the target of doxing and swatting by unidentified persons.

== See also ==
- List of African-American federal judges
- List of African-American jurists
- List of Jamaican Americans

Legal offices
| New seat | Judge of the United States District Court for the District of Columbia; 2014–present | Incumbent |
