= William W. Nooter =

American judge

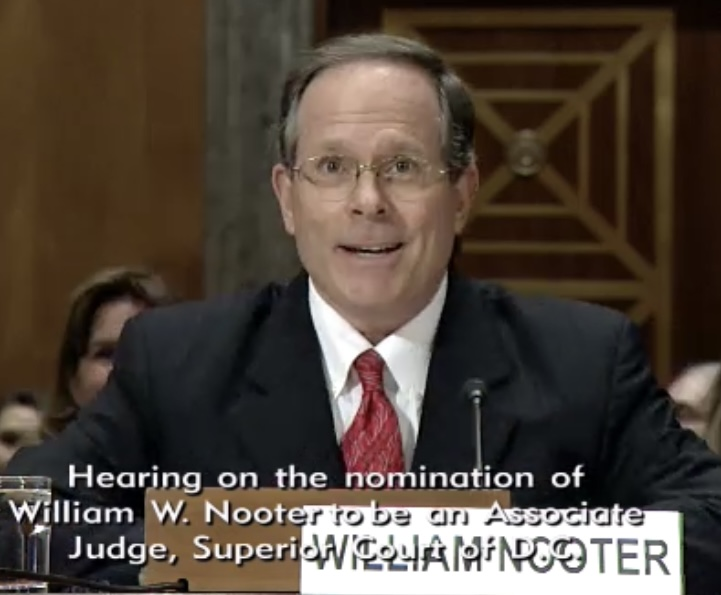

Associate Judge of the Superior Court of the District of Columbia
- In office December 22, 2015 – February 25, 2023
- President: Barack Obama
- Preceded by: A. Franklin Burgess
- Succeeded by: Christine Macey

Personal details
- Born: February 8, 1954 (age 72) St. Louis, Missouri, U.S.
- Spouse: Elissa Free
- Children: 1
- Education: St. John's College (BA); George Washington University (JD)

William Ward Nooter (born February 8, 1954) is a former Associate Judge on the Superior Court of the District of Columbia.

== Education and career ==
Nooter earned his Bachelor of Arts from St. John's College in Annapolis, Maryland, and in 1981, his Juris Doctor from the National Law Center at George Washington University.

=== D.C. Superior Court ===
President Barack Obama nominated Nooter on July 11, 2013, to a 15-year term as an associate judge on the Superior Court of the District of Columbia. On October 8, 2013, the Senate Committee on Homeland Security and Governmental Affairs held a hearing on his nomination. On November 6, 2013, the Committee reported his nomination favorably to the senate floor. His nomination expired following the Adjournment sine die of the United States Congress.

On April 30, 2015, President Barack Obama renominated Nooter to the same court to the seat vacated by A. Franklin Burgess. On June 24, 2015, the Committee reported his nomination favorably to the senate floor. On November 19, 2015, the Senate confirmed his nomination by voice vote. He was sworn in on December 22, 2015. He retired from the court on February 25, 2023.

== Personal life ==
Nooter was born in St. Louis, Missouri. He moved to Washington, D.C. as a teenager and has lived there since. He is married to Elissa Free, with whom he has one daughter.
