= Ebony M. Scott =

American judge (born 1978)

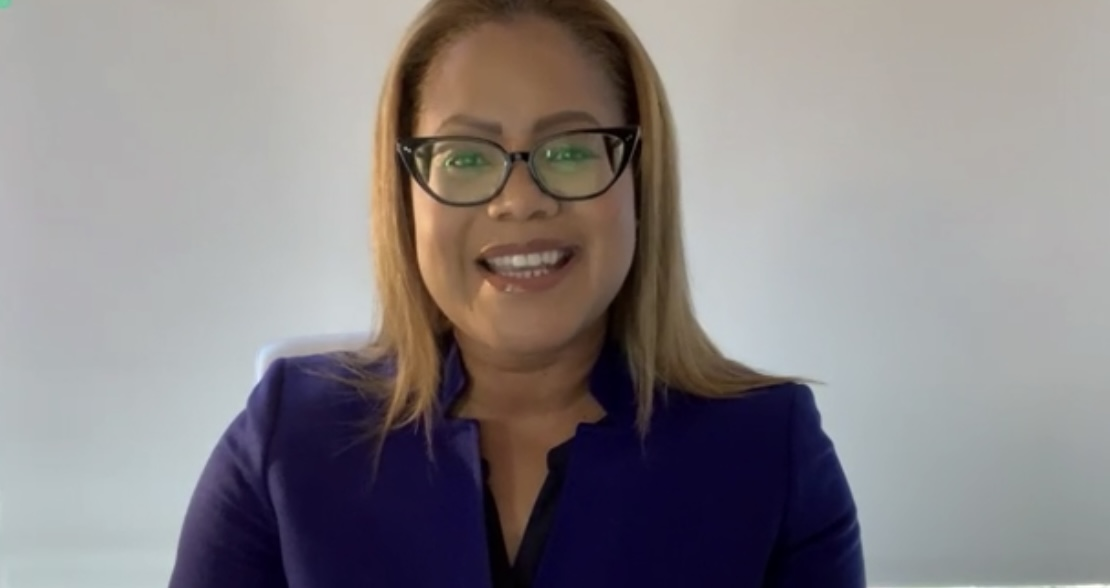

Associate Judge of the Superior Court of the District of Columbia
- Incumbent
- Assumed office February 25, 2022
- Appointed by: Joe Biden
- Preceded by: Rhonda Reid Winston

Magistrate Judge of the Superior Court of the District of Columbia
- In office January 2020 – February 2022
- Appointed by: Robert E. Morin

Personal details
- Born: Ebony Michelle Robinson; November 14, 1978 (age 47) Buffalo, New York, U.S.
- Education: University of Rochester (BA); Washington College of Law (JD)

Ebony M. Scott (born November 14, 1978) is an American lawyer who has served as an associate judge of the Superior Court of the District of Columbia since 2022. She previously served as a magistrate judge of the same court from 2020 to 2022.

== Early life and education ==
Scott was born in Buffalo, New York. She received her Bachelor of Arts from the University of Rochester in 2000 and her Juris Doctor from the Washington College of Law of American University in 2006.

== Legal career ==
From 2006 to 2007, Scott served as a law clerk for Judge Anna Blackburne-Rigsby of the District of Columbia Court of Appeals. From 2007 to 2012, she was a civil litigator at Chaikin, Sherman, Cammarata & Siegel, P.C. From 2012 to 2016, Scott served as an assistant attorney general for the Office of the Attorney General in the Housing and Community Justice section. From 2016 to 2018, she served as general counsel for the District of Columbia Office of Human Rights. From 2018 to 2019, Scott served as a deputy director in the District of Columbia Mayor’s office of legal counsel.

== Judicial career ==
=== D.C. Superior Court magistrate judge service ===
She served as a magistrate judge of the Superior Court of the District of Columbia from January 17, 2020, to February 25, 2022.

=== D.C. Superior Court service ===
On September 30, 2021, President Joe Biden nominated Scott to serve as a Judge of the Superior Court of the District of Columbia. President Biden nominated Scott to the seat vacated by Judge Rhonda Reid Winston, whose term expired on September 30, 2016. On November 18, 2021, a hearing on her nomination was held before the Senate Homeland Security and Governmental Affairs Committee. On December 1, 2021, her nomination was reported out of committee.

On February 2, 2022, the United States Senate invoked cloture on her nomination by a 58–37 vote. On February 7, 2022, the Senate confirmed her nomination by a 55–38 vote. She was sworn in on February 25, 2022.

Legal offices
| Preceded by Rhonda Reid Winston | Judge of the Superior Court of the District of Columbia; 2022–present | Incumbent |
