= Erik Christian =

American judge (born 1960)

Associate Judge of the Superior Court of the District of Columbia
- Incumbent
- Assumed office July 20, 2001
- President: George W. Bush
- Preceded by: Eugene N. Hamilton

Personal details
- Born: November 18, 1960 (age 64); Washington, D.C., U.S.
- Education: Howard University (BA); Georgetown University (JD)

Erik Patrick Christian (born November 18, 1960) is an associate judge of the Superior Court of the District of Columbia.

== Education and career ==
Christian earned his Bachelor of Arts from Howard University in 1982 and his Juris Doctor from Georgetown University Law Center in 1986.

After graduating, he was a law clerk for Superior Court of the District of Columbia Judge Annice M. Wagner.

=== D.C. superior court ===
President George W. Bush nominated Christian on April 4, 2001, to a fifteen-year term as an associate judge of the Superior Court of the District of Columbia to the seat vacated by Judge Eugene N. Hamilton. On May 22, 2001, the Senate Committee on Homeland Security and Governmental Affairs held a hearing on his nomination. On May 23, 2001, the Committee reported his nomination favorably to the senate floor. On May 24, 2001, the full Senate confirmed his nomination by voice vote. He was sworn in on July 20, 2001.

In 2016, following the recommendation of the District of Columbia Commission on Judicial Disabilities and Tenure, President Obama reappointed him for a second fifteen-year term.
