= Laura Cordero =

American judge (born 1965)

Associate Judge of the Superior Court of the District of Columbia
- Incumbent
- Assumed office September 2, 2005
- President: George W. Bush
- Preceded by: Shellie Fountain Bowers

Personal details
- Born: January 3, 1965 (age 60); Chicago, Illinois, U.S.
- Education: DePaul University (BA); Harvard University (JD)

Laura Alicia Cordero (born January 3, 1965) is an associate judge of the Superior Court of the District of Columbia.

== Education and career ==
Cordero earned her Bachelor of Arts from DePaul University in 1985, and her Juris Doctor from Harvard Law School in 1988.

After graduating, she clerked for Judge James Aubrey Parker of the United States District Court for the District of New Mexico.

=== D.C. Superior Court ===
On May 20, 2004, President George W. Bush nominated Cordero to be an associate judge of the Superior Court of the District of Columbia. Her nomination expired on December 8, 2004, with the end of the 108th United States Congress.

President George W. Bush renominated her on February 14, 2005, to a 15-year term as an associate judge on the Superior Court of the District of Columbia to the seat vacated by Judge Shellie Fountain Bowers. On June 15, 2005, the Senate Committee on Homeland Security and Governmental Affairs held a hearing on her nomination. On June 22, 2005, the committee reported her nomination favorably to the senate floor. On June 24, 2005, the full Senate confirmed her nomination by voice vote. She was sworn in on September 2, 2005.
