= Ronna Lee Beck =

American judge

Senior Judge of the Superior Court of the District of Columbia
- Incumbent
- Assumed office January 8, 2021

Associate Judge of the Superior Court of the District of Columbia
- In office May 26, 1995 – January 8, 2021
- President: Bill Clinton
- Preceded by: Bruce D. Beaudin
- Succeeded by: Kenia Seoane Lopez

Personal details
- Born: November 17, 1947 (age 77); Pittsburgh, Pennsylvania, U.S.
- Children: 3
- Education: University of Michigan (BA); Yale University (JD)

Ronna Lee Beck (born November 17, 1947) is an American attorney and jurist serving as a senior associate judge on the Superior Court of the District of Columbia.

== Early life and education ==
Beck was born in Pittsburgh, Pennsylvania. She earned a Bachelor of Arts from University of Michigan in 1969 and a Juris Doctor from Yale Law School in 1972.

== Career ==
After graduating from law school, Beck served as a law clerk for judge Theodore R. Newman Jr. on the D.C. Superior Court.

=== D.C. superior court ===
On January 4, 1995, President Bill Clinton nominated Beck to a fifteen-year term as an associate judge on the Superior Court of the District of Columbia to the seat vacated by Bruce D. Beaudin. On May 22, 1995, the Senate Committee on Governmental Affairs held a hearing on her nomination. On May 25, 1995, the Committee reported her nomination favorably to the senate floor. On May 25, 1995, the full Senate confirmed her nomination by voice vote.

On March 25, 2010, the Commission on Judicial Disabilities and Tenure recommended that President Barack Obama reappoint her to second fifteen-year term as a judge on the D.C. Superior Court.

She assumed senior status on January 8, 2021.

== Personal life ==
Beck has lived in Washington, D.C. since 1972. She is married and has three children.
