= Jason Park =

American judge

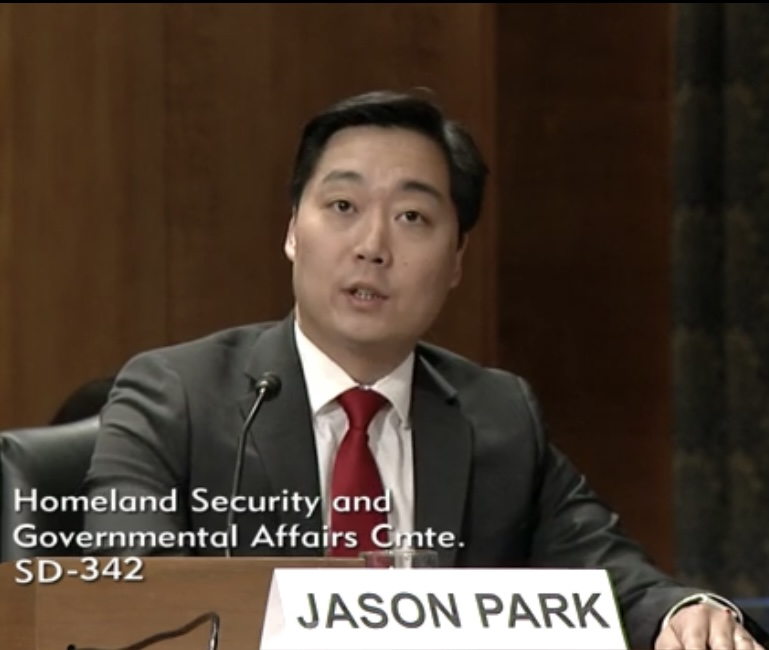

Associate Judge of the Superior Court of the District of Columbia
- Incumbent
- Assumed office August 2019
- President: Donald Trump
- Preceded by: John McAdam Mott

Personal details
- Born: November 23, 1979 (age 45); Morgantown, West Virginia, U.S.
- Education: Princeton University (BA); Georgetown University (JD)

Jason Park (born November 23, 1979) is an associate judge of the Superior Court of the District of Columbia.

Park graduated from Central High School in Tuscaloosa, Alabama. Park received his Bachelor of Arts from Princeton University and his Juris Doctor from the Georgetown University Law Center in 2006. After law school, Park worked as an associate in the New York City office of Chadbourne & Parke LLP, where his practice focused on complex commercial litigation. In 2009, he became a law clerk for Judge Ricardo M. Urbina of the United States District Court for the District of Columbia.

In 2012, Park became an assistant United States attorney at the U.S. Attorney's Office for the District of Columbia, where he served as deputy chief in the felony major crimes section of the Superior Court division. Park investigated and prosecuted violent crimes, specializing in sexual assault and child sexual and physical abuse cases. He also prosecuted child exploitation and juvenile sex trafficking cases. Park is a recipient of the FBI Washington Field Office Service Award and the U.S. Attorney's Office Impact Award.

In January 2019, Park was nominated by President Donald Trump to a 15-year term as an associate judge of the Superior Court of the District of Columbia. He was confirmed by the U.S. Senate on August 1, 2019. His official investiture ceremony took place on January 24, 2020.
