= Carmen G. McLean =

American judge (born 1976)

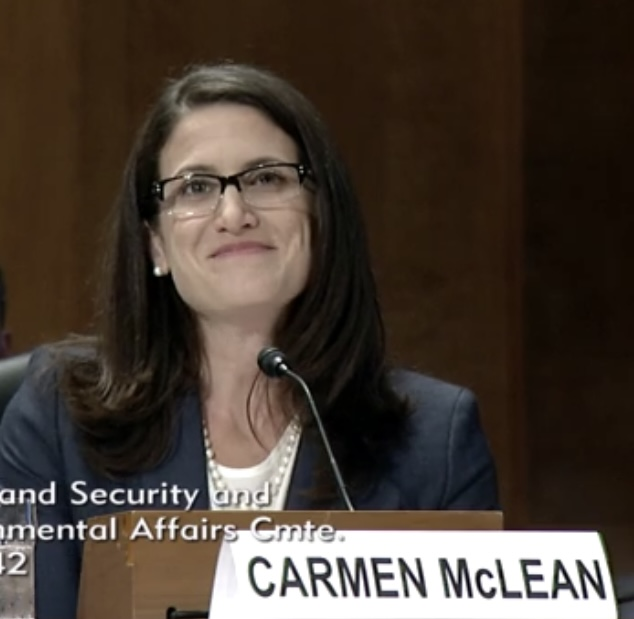

Associate Judge of the Superior Court of the District of Columbia
- Incumbent
- Assumed office May 3, 2019
- President: Donald Trump
- Preceded by: Gregory E. Jackson

Personal details
- Born: Carmen May Guerricagoitia; September 25, 1976 (age 49) Ontario, Oregon, U.S.
- Children: 2
- Education: George Fox University (BSc); Georgetown University (JD)

Carmen May Guerricagoitia McLean (born September 25, 1976) is an American lawyer and jurist serving as an associate judge of the Superior Court of the District of Columbia.

== Early life and education ==
McLean was born on September 25, 1976, in Ontario, Oregon. She graduated from George Fox University in 1998 with a Bachelor of Science degree, summa cum laude, and from Georgetown University Law Center in 2001 with a Juris Doctor degree.

== Career ==
In 2001, she began her career as an associate at Jones Day. She served as partner from 2011 to 2019. She was active in firm management and leadership and served as the co-chair of the Diversity Committee and as the Pro Bono and Public Service Partner for Jones Day's Washington, D.C., office. In 2012, McLean received the Pro Bono Lawyer of the Year Award from the District of Columbia Bar.

=== D.C. Superior court ===
On September 27, 2016, President Barack Obama nominated McLean to be a judge on the Superior Court of the District of Columbia. Her nomination, which was not acted upon prior to the end of the 114th Congress, expired.

On October 30, 2017, McLean was nominated by President Donald Trump to a 15-year term as an associate judge on the same court. She was confirmed by the U.S. Senate on January 2, 2019. She was sworn in on May 3, 2019.

== Personal life ==
McLean is married and has two children.
