= Maurice A. Ross =

American judge (born 1961)

Associate Judge of the Superior Court of the District of Columbia
- In office July 27, 2001 – February 27, 2026
- President: George W. Bush
- Preceded by: Henry F. Greene
- Succeeded by: vacant

Personal details
- Born: January 3, 1961 (age 65) Washington, D.C., U.S.
- Education: Yale University (BA); Harvard University (JD)

Maurice A. Ross (born January 3, 1961) is a former associate judge of the Superior Court of the District of Columbia.

== Education and career ==
Ross earned his Bachelor of Arts from Yale College in 1983 and his Juris Doctor from Harvard Law School in 1986.

From 1986 to 1989, Ross worked as an attorney at Shaw Pittman. He then became an Assistant United States Attorney for the District of Columbia. He later went to work at the Justice Department as special assistant to the deputy attorney general and associate deputy attorney general. From 1993 to 1997 he worked as an attorney for Freddie Mac.

=== D.C. superior court ===
President George W. Bush nominated Ross on April 4, 2001, to a 15-year term as an associate judge of the Superior Court of the District of Columbia to the seat vacated by Judge Henry F. Greene. On May 22, 2001, the Senate Committee on Homeland Security and Governmental Affairs held a hearing on his nomination. On May 23, 2001, the Committee reported his nomination favorably to the senate floor. On May 24, 2001, the full Senate confirmed his nomination by voice vote. He was sworn in on July 27, 2001. He resigned from the court on February 27, 2026.
