= Darlene M. Soltys =

American judge (born 1965)

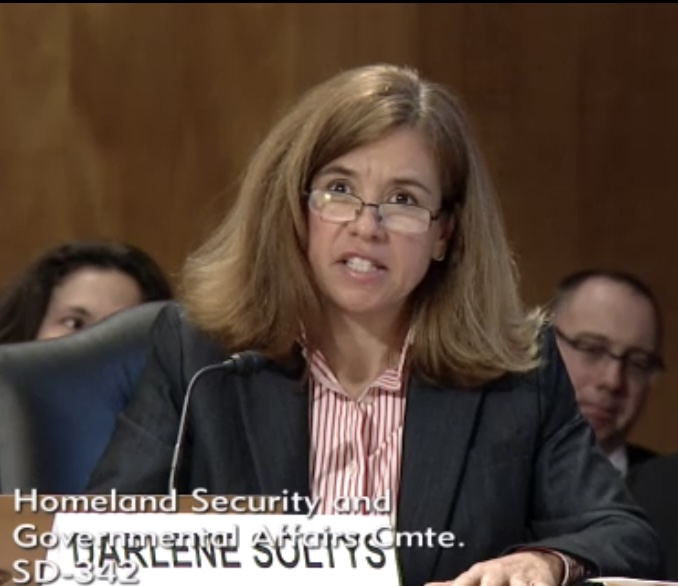

Associate Judge of the Superior Court of the District of Columbia
- Incumbent
- Assumed office March 18, 2016
- President: Barack Obama
- Preceded by: Natalia Combs Greene

Personal details
- Born: Darlene Michele Soltys; August 13, 1965 (age 60) Bellingham, Washington, U.S.
- Education: University of Maryland (BA); Georgetown University (JD)

Darlene Michele Soltys (born August 13, 1965) is an associate judge of the Superior Court of the District of Columbia.

== Education and career ==
Soltys earned her Bachelor of Arts from University of Maryland, in 1987, and Juris Doctor from Georgetown University Law Center, in 1990.

After graduating law school, Soltys served as a law clerk for Judge Gregory E. Mize of the Superior Court of the District of Columbia. In 1992, she served as assistant corporation counsel for the District of Columbia until 1996 when she became an assistant state's attorney in Prince George's County, Maryland. In 2003, she worked in the U.S. Attorney's Office in the District of Columbia as assistant United States attorney.

=== D.C. superior court ===
On July 9, 2015, President Barack Obama nominated Soltys to a 15-year term as an associate judge of the Superior Court of the District of Columbia to the seat vacated by Judge Natalia Combs Greene. On December 3, 2015, the Senate Committee on Homeland Security and Governmental Affairs held a hearing on her nomination. On December 17, 2015, the Committee reported her nomination favorably to the Senate floor and later that day, the United States Senate confirmed her nomination by voice vote. She was sworn in on March 18, 2016.
