= Maribeth Raffinan =

American judge (born 1970)

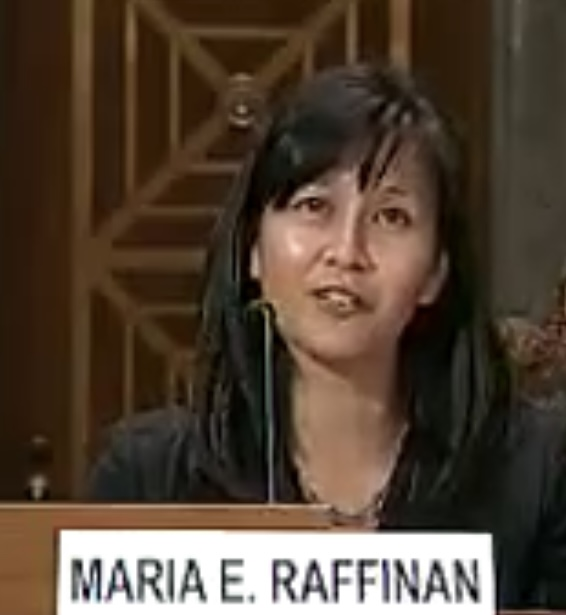

Associate Judge of the Superior Court of the District of Columbia
- Incumbent
- Assumed office October 29, 2010
- President: Barack Obama
- Preceded by: Odessa F. Vincent

Personal details
- Born: Maria Elizabeth Raffinan; September 2, 1970 (age 56) Cincinnati, Ohio, U.S.
- Education: Boston College (BA); Catholic University of America (JD)

Maria Elizabeth "Maribeth" Raffinan (born September 2, 1970) is an associate judge of the Superior Court of the District of Columbia.

== Education and career ==
Raffinan earned her Bachelor of Arts from Boston College in 1992, and her Juris Doctor from Columbus School of Law for the Catholic University of America in 1995.

From 1996 to 1999, Raffinan worked in the Office of the Federal Public Defender Service for the District of Columbia. From September 1999 to October 2010, she worked as an attorney for the Public Defender Service for the District of Columbia.

=== D.C. Superior Court ===
President Barack Obama nominated Raffinan on July 28, 2010, to a 15-year term as an associate judge on the Superior Court of the District of Columbia to the seat vacated by Odessa F. Vincent. On September 21, 2010, the Senate Committee on Homeland Security and Governmental Affairs held a hearing on her nomination. On September 29, 2010, the Committee reported her nomination favorably to the senate floor and later that day, the full Senate confirmed her nomination by voice vote. She was sworn in on October 29, 2010.

== Personal life ==
Raffinan was born in Cincinnati, Ohio and was raised there and in Clearwater, Florida. She moved to Washington, D.C. in 1992 and has been living there since. She has a daughter named Leah, a son named Jonah, and a husband, Efrem Levy.
