= Elizabeth Carroll Wingo =

American judge (born 1970)

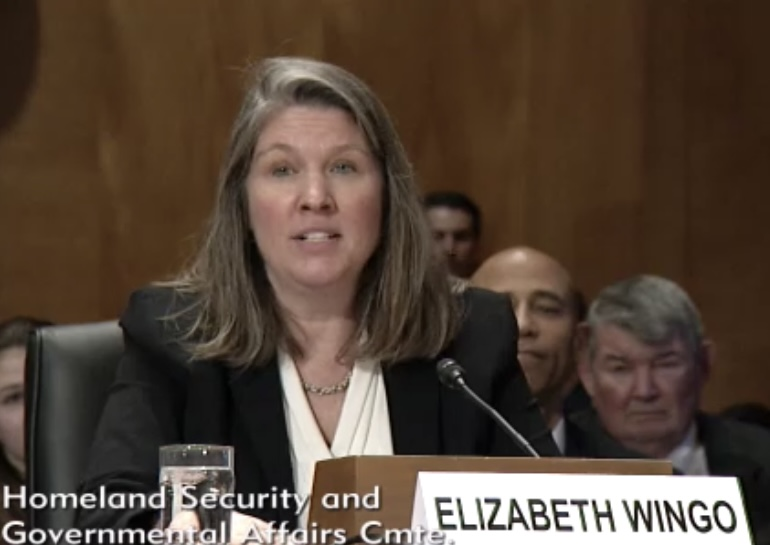

Associate Judge of the Superior Court of the District of Columbia
- Incumbent
- Assumed office August 26, 2016
- President: Barack Obama
- Preceded by: Ann O'Regan Keary

Magistrate Judge of the Superior Court of the District of Columbia
- In office August 18, 2006 – August 26, 2016

Personal details
- Born: 1970 (age 55–56) Washington, D.C., U.S.
- Spouse: Harry Wingo
- Education: Dartmouth College (BA); Yale University (JD)

Elizabeth Carroll Wingo (born 1970) is an associate judge of the Superior Court of the District of Columbia.

== Education and career ==
Wingo earned her Bachelor of Arts from Dartmouth College in 1992 and her Juris Doctor from Yale Law School in 1997.

After law school, she worked as an associate in Washington office of Sullivan and Cromwell. From 1998 to 1999, she clerked for Judge T. S. Ellis III of the United States District Court for the Eastern District of Virginia. From 1999 to 2004, she was an assistant United States attorney at the United States Attorney's Office in the District of Columbia. From 2004 to 2006, she served as chief of the criminal section in the Office of the Attorney General for the District of Columbia, and in 2006, she served as the assistant deputy attorney general for Public Safety.

=== D.C. superior court ===
On August 18, 2006, Chief Judge Rufus G. King III appointed Wingo as a magistrate judge of the Superior Court of the District of Columbia.

On November 30, 2015, President Barack Obama nominated Wingo to a 15-year term as an associate judge on the same court. On March 2, 2016, the Senate Committee on Homeland Security and Governmental Affairs held a hearing on her nomination. On April 25, 2016, the Committee reported her nomination favorably to the senate floor. On June 23, 2016, the Senate confirmed her nomination by voice vote.
