= José M. López (judge) =

American judge

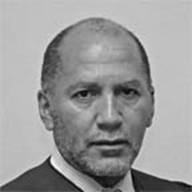
- López in 2009

Associate Judge on the Superior Court of the District of Columbia
- In office 1990 – December 31, 2021
- President: George H. W. Bush
- Succeeded by: Errol Rajesh Arthur

Personal details
- Born: May 29, 1949 (age 76); Santo Domingo, Dominican Republic
- Education: Middlebury College (BA); Suffolk University (JD)

José M. López (born May 29, 1949) is a former associate judge on the Superior Court of the District of Columbia.

== Education and career ==
López earned his Bachelor of Arts from Middlebury College in 1973, and his Juris Doctor from Suffolk University Law School in 1977.

=== D.C. Superior Court ===
President George H. W. Bush nominated López on April 19, 1990, to a fifteen-year term as an associate judge on the Superior Court of the District of Columbia. On July 20, 1990, the Senate Committee on Governmental Affairs held a hearing on his nomination. On August 2, 1990, the Committee reported his nomination favorably to the senate floor. On August 4, 1990, the full United States Senate confirmed his nomination by unanimous consent. He retired from the court on December 31, 2021.

== Personal life ==
López was born in the Dominican Republic and grew up in Brooklyn, New York.
