= Adrienne Jennings Noti =

American judge (born 1974)

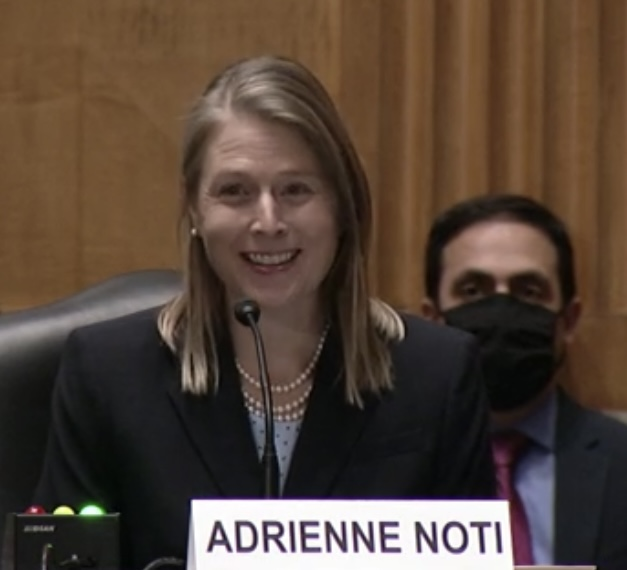

Judge of the Superior Court of the District of Columbia
- Incumbent
- Assumed office March 25, 2024
- Appointed by: Joe Biden
- Preceded by: Frederick H. Weisberg

Magistrate Judge of the Superior Court of the District of Columbia
- In office 2014 – March 25, 2024

Personal details
- Born: February 23, 1974 (age 52) Washington, D.C., U.S.
- Education: University of North Carolina at Chapel Hill (BA); Georgetown University (JD)

Adrienne Jennings Noti (born February 23, 1974) is an American lawyer who has served as an associate judge of the Superior Court of the District of Columbia. She previously served as a magistrate judge of the same court from 2014 to 2024.

== Education ==
Noti received her Bachelor of Arts from the University of North Carolina at Chapel Hill in 1996 and her Juris Doctor, magna cum laude, from the Georgetown University Law Center in 2000.

== Career ==
Noti began her legal career as a law clerk for Judge Carol Amon of the United States District Court for the Eastern District of New York from 2000 to 2001. From 2001 to 2002, she was a legal fellow with the Center for Reproductive Rights. From 2002 to 2004, she was a staff attorney with the Safe Horizon Domestic Violence Law Project in New York City. From 2004 to 2006, Noti was a clinical law professor at Rutgers School of Law and director of a pro bono program for law students. From 2006 to 2010, she was a clinical law professor at American University’s Washington College of Law. She has also served as an adjunct professor at New York University Silver School of Social Work and the Georgetown University Law Center. From 2010 to 2011, she served as a managing attorney at the D.C. Bar Pro Bono Program. From 2011 to 2014, she was an advisor at the Office of Child Support Enforcement of the United States Department of Health and Human Services.

=== D.C. superior court service ===
She served as a magistrate judge of the Superior Court of the District of Columbia from 2014 to 2024.

On September 30, 2021, President Joe Biden nominated Noti to serve as a Judge of the Superior Court of the District of Columbia. President Biden nominated Noti to the seat vacated by Judge Frederick H. Weisberg, who retired on March 22, 2018. On December 2, 2021, a hearing on her nomination was held before the Senate Homeland Security and Governmental Affairs Committee. On January 3, 2022, her nomination was returned to the President under Rule XXXI, Paragraph 6 of the United States Senate; she was later renominated the same day. On February 2, 2022, her nomination was favorably reported out of committee. On January 3, 2023, her nomination was returned to the president. She was renominated on January 23, 2023. The Senate Committee on Homeland Security and Governmental Affairs reported her nomination out of committee by a 8–4 vote. On January 3, 2024, her nomination was returned to the president. She was renominated on January 11, 2024. On January 31, 2024, her nomination was favorably reported out of committee by an 8–5 vote. On March 7, 2024, the Senate invoked cloture on her nomination by a 52–46 vote. Later that day, her nomination was confirmed by a 51–45 vote. She was sworn in on March 25, 2024.

== Personal life ==
She has been married to her husband Adav Noti since 2009.

Legal offices
Preceded by Frederick H. Weisberg	Judge of the Superior Court of the District of Columbia; 2024–present	Incumbent
