= Hiram E. Puig-Lugo =

American judge (born 1961)

Senior Judge of the Superior Court of the District of Columbia
- Incumbent
- Assumed office 2023

Associate Judge of the Superior Court of the District of Columbia
- In office June 6, 1999 – July 28, 2023
- President: Bill Clinton
- Preceded by: Arthur L. Burnett
- Succeeded by: vacant

Personal details
- Born: July 8, 1961 (age 63); San Germán, Puerto Rico
- Education: University of Wisconsin-Madison (BS); University of Wisconsin Law School (JD)

Hiram E. Puig-Lugo (born July 8, 1961) is a senior judge of the Superior Court of the District of Columbia.

== Education and career ==
Puig-Lugo earned his Bachelor of Science in 1984 from University of Wisconsin-Madison and his Juris Doctor in 1988 from University of Wisconsin Law School.

=== D.C. Superior Court ===
President Bill Clinton nominated Puig-Lugo on January 6, 1999, to a fifteen-year term as an associate judge on the Superior Court of the District of Columbia to the seat vacated by Judge Arthur L. Burnett. On April 20, 1999, the Senate Committee on Governmental Affairs held a hearing on his nomination. On May 20, 1999, the Committee reported his nomination favorably to the senate floor. On May 26, 1999, the full United States Senate confirmed his nomination by voice vote.

On April 4, 2014, the Commission on Judicial Disabilities and Tenure recommended that President Obama reappoint him to a second fifteen-year term as a judge on the D.C. Superior Court. He retired from the court on July 28, 2023, Starting in August 2023, he was evaluated for an appointment as a senior judge and assumed office later that year.
