= Jennifer M. Anderson =

American judge (born 1959)

Senior Judge of the Superior Court of the District of Columbia
- Incumbent
- Assumed office March 22, 2024

Associate Judge of the Superior Court of the District of Columbia
- In office October 27, 2006 – March 22, 2024
- President: George W. Bush
- Preceded by: Steffen W. Graae
- Succeeded by: vacant

Personal details
- Born: Jennifer Mary Anderson; May 28, 1959 (age 67) Dublin, Ireland
- Education: Mount St. Mary's College (BA); Catholic University of America (JD)

Jennifer Mary Anderson (born May 28, 1959) is an Irish-American jurist who is a senior associate judge on the Superior Court of the District of Columbia.

== Education and career ==
Anderson earned her Bachelor of Arts, magna cum laude, from Mount St. Mary's College in 1981, and her Juris Doctor from Columbus School of Law in 1984.

After graduating, she joined Cadwalader, Wickersham & Taft as an associate. In 1991 she became an assistant at the U.S. Attorney's Office in the District of Columbia.

=== D.C. Superior Court ===
On November 16, 2004, President George W. Bush nominated her to be an associate judge of the Superior Court of the District of Columbia. Her nomination expired on December 8, 2004, with the end of the 108th United States Congress.

President George W. Bush renominated her on February 14, 2005, to a 15-year term as an associate judge of the Superior Court of the District of Columbia to the seat vacated by Judge Steffen W. Graae. On July 11, 2006, the Senate Committee on Homeland Security and Governmental Affairs held a hearing on her nomination. On July 27, 2006, the committee reported her nomination favorably to the senate floor. On August 3, 2006, the full Senate confirmed her nomination by voice vote. She was sworn in on October 27, 2006.

Anderson assumed senior status on March 22, 2024.

== Personal life ==
Anderson was born in Dublin, Ireland; her family later immigrated in 1967 to the United States and settled in Baltimore, Maryland.
