= Juliet J. McKenna =

American judge (born 1970)

Associate Judge of the Superior Court of the District of Columbia
- Incumbent
- Assumed office December 16, 2005
- President: George W. Bush
- Preceded by: Nan R. Shuker

Magistrate Judge on the Superior Court of the District of Columbia
- In office April 2002 – December 16, 2005
- Preceded by: Seat established by Family Court Act of 2001

Personal details
- Born: October 19, 1970 (age 54); Valparaiso, Indiana, U.S.
- Education: Georgetown University (BA); Yale University (JD)

Juliet JoAnn McKenna (born October 19, 1970) is an associate judge of the Superior Court of the District of Columbia.

== Education and career ==
McKenna earned a Bachelor of Arts, magna cum laude, from Georgetown University in 1992, and a Juris Doctor from Yale Law School in 1995.

After graduating, she joined the law firm Crowell & Moring for a year. She then went to work in the Office of the D.C. Attorney General. She also taught at the Georgetown University Law Center as an adjunct professor of law.

=== D.C. superior court ===
In April 2002, McKenna was appointed as a magistrate judge on the Superior Court of the District of Columbia pursuant to the Family Court Act of 2001 which created the seat.

On May 20, 2004, President George W. Bush nominated her to serve as an associate judge on the same court. Her nomination expired on December 8, 2004, with the end of the 108th United States Congress.

President Bush renominated her on February 14, 2005, to a 15-year term as an associate judge of the Superior Court of the District of Columbia to the seat vacated by Nan R. Shuker. On September 13, 2005, the Senate Committee on Homeland Security and Governmental Affairs held a hearing on her nomination. On September 22, 2005, the committee reported her nomination favorably to the Senate. On October 7, 2005, the full Senate confirmed her nomination by voice vote. She was sworn in on December 16, 2005.

== Personal life ==
McKenna was born in Valparaiso, Indiana and raised in Connecticut. In the 1990s, she moved to Washington, D.C. where she has been living since.
