= Steven M. Wellner =

American judge (born 1959)

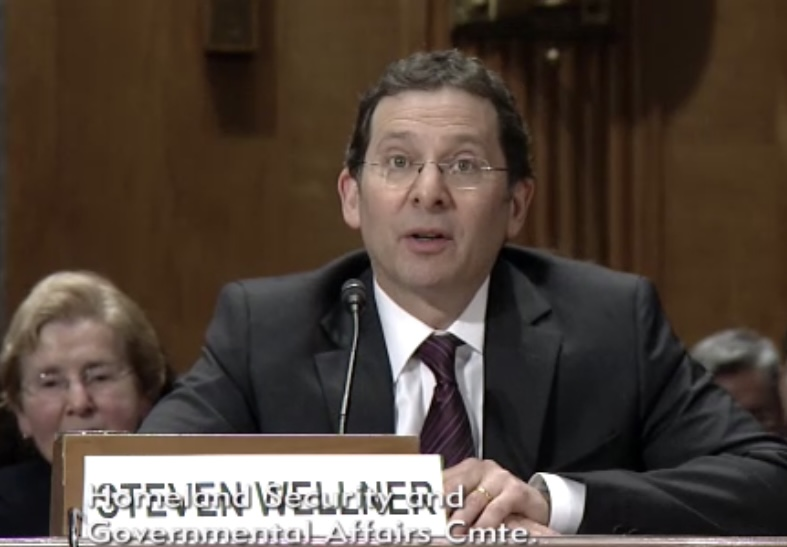

Associate Judge of the Superior Court of the District of Columbia
- Incumbent
- Assumed office February 19, 2016
- President: Barack Obama
- Preceded by: Kaye K. Christian

Personal details
- Born: January 20, 1959 (age 66); Madison, Wisconsin
- Education: University of Virginia (BA); University of Michigan (JD)

Steven Michael Wellner (born January 20, 1959) is an associate judge of the Superior Court of the District of Columbia.

== Early life ==
Born in Madison, Wisconsin, Wellner grew up outside Baltimore, Maryland. He earned a Bachelor of Arts degree from the University of Virginia in 1981 and graduated Juris Doctor from the University of Michigan Law School in 1985.

== Career ==
In his early career, Wellner joined the Washington, D.C. office of Kirkland & Ellis, where he became a partner.

=== D.C. superior court ===
On November 21, 2013, President Barack Obama nominated Wellner to a 15-year term as an associate judge on the Superior Court of the District of Columbia. On March 24, 2014, the Senate Committee on Homeland Security and Governmental Affairs held a hearing on his nomination. His nomination expired on January 3, 2015, with the end of the 113th United States Congress.

On April 30, 2015, President Obama renominated Wellner to the same court to the seat vacated by Judge Kaye K. Christian. On June 24, 2015, the committee reported his nomination favorably to the senate floor. On November 19, 2015, the Senate confirmed his nomination by voice vote. He was sworn in on February 19, 2016.

== Personal life ==
Wellner currently lives in Washington, D.C. with his wife Amy Saltzman. They have two children.
