= Craig Iscoe =

American judge (born 1953)

Senior Judge of the Superior Court of the District of Columbia
- Incumbent
- Assumed office January 13, 2026

Associate Judge of the Superior Court of the District of Columbia
- In office January 5, 2004 – January 13, 2026
- President: George W. Bush
- Preceded by: Frederick D. Dorsey
- Succeeded by: Michael DiLorenzo

Personal details
- Born: May 10, 1953 (age 73) Austin, Texas, U.S.
- Spouse: Rosemary Hart
- Children: 2
- Education: University of Texas (BA); Stanford University (JD); Georgetown University (LLM)

Craig S. Iscoe (born May 10, 1953) is a senior judge of the Superior Court of the District of Columbia.

== Education and career ==
Iscoe earned his Bachelor of Arts from University of Texas in 1974, his Juris Doctor from Stanford Law School in 1978 and his Master of Laws from Georgetown University Law Center in 1979.

From 1980 to 1982, Iscoe was an attorney for the Federal Trade Commission. In 1982, he joined the law firm Arent Fox. In 1984, he became an assistant United States attorney.

Iscoe has served as an adjunct professor at Georgetown University. He also taught at the National Institute for Trial Advocacy and was an assistant professor at Vanderbilt University Law School.

=== D.C. Superior Court ===
President George W. Bush nominated Iscoe on July 14, 2003, to a 15-year term as an associate judge on the Superior Court of the District of Columbia to the seat vacated by Judge Frederick D. Dorsey. On September 30, 2003, the Senate Committee on Homeland Security and Governmental Affairs held a hearing on his nomination. On October 22, 2003, the Committee reported his nomination favorably to the senate floor. On October 24, 2003, the full Senate confirmed his nomination by voice vote. He was sworn in on January 5, 2004.

On August 29, 2018, the Commission on Judicial Disabilities and Tenure recommended that President Trump reappoint him to second 15-year term as a judge on the D.C. Superior Court. He took senior status on January 13, 2026.
