= Robert A. Salerno =

American judge (born 1961)

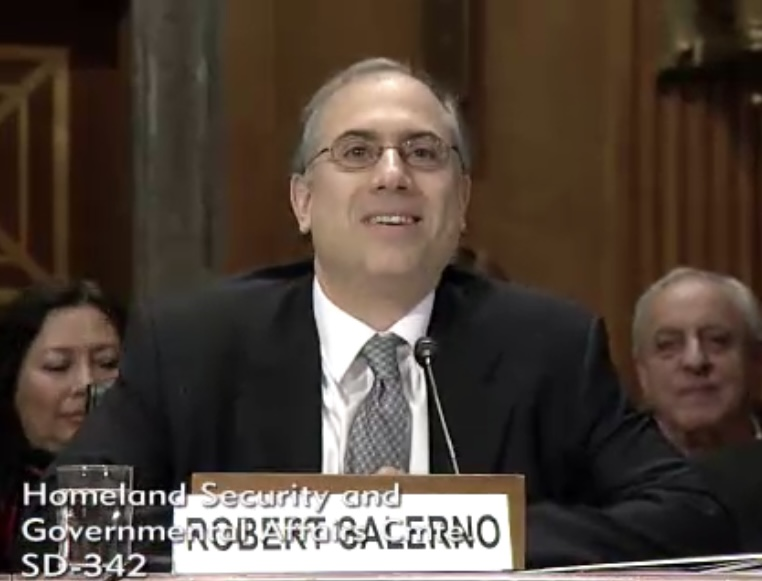

Associate Judge of the Superior Court of the District of Columbia
- Incumbent
- Assumed office March 11, 2016
- President: Barack Obama
- Preceded by: Robert Isaac Richter

Personal details
- Born: Robert Alan Salerno; September 14, 1961 (age 63); Newark, New Jersey, U.S.
- Spouse: Juanita
- Children: 2
- Education: Brown University (BA); University of Virginia (JD)

Robert Alan Salerno (born September 14, 1961) is an associate judge of the Superior Court of the District of Columbia.

== Education and career ==
Born in Newark, New Jersey, Salerno graduated from Seton Hall Preparatory School in 1979.

Salerno earned his Bachelor of Arts from Brown University, in 1983, and Juris Doctor from the University of Virginia School of Law in 1990.

After graduating law school, Salerno worked in various law firms in Washington, D.C.

=== D.C. superior court ===
On September 29, 2014, President Barack Obama nominated Salerno to a 15-year term as an associate judge of the Superior Court of the District of Columbia to the seat vacated by Judge Robert Isaac Richter. On December 3, 2015, the Senate Committee on Homeland Security and Governmental Affairs held a hearing on his nomination. On December 17, 2015, the Committee reported his nomination favorably to the senate floor and later that day, the Senate confirmed his nomination by voice vote. He was sworn in on March 11, 2016.

== Personal life ==
Salerno has been a resident of Washington D.C. since 1990 and lives there with his wife Juanita. They have two children.
