= Kelly Higashi =

American judge (born 1962)

Kelly A. Higashi
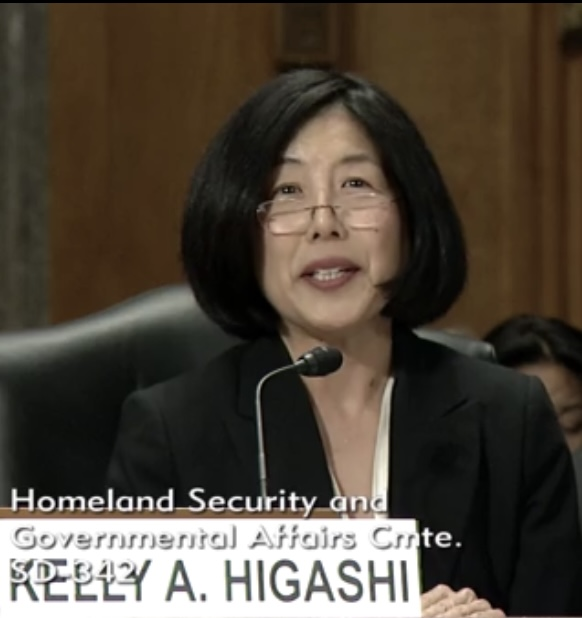

Associate Judge of the Superior Court of the District of Columbia
- Incumbent
- Assumed office October 26, 2018
- President: Donald Trump
- Preceded by: Thomas J. Motley

Personal details
- Born: February 1, 1962 (age 64) Los Angeles, California, U.S.
- Education: University of Pennsylvania (BA); George Washington University (JD)

Kelly Higashi (born February 1, 1962) is an associate judge of the Superior Court of the District of Columbia. In February 2018, Higashi was nominated by President Donald Trump to a 15-year term as an associate judge on the Superior Court. She was confirmed by the U.S. Senate on July 12, 2018, and her investiture took place on October 26, 2018.

Higashi received her Bachelor of Arts from the University of Pennsylvania and her Juris Doctor from George Washington University Law School. After law school, she clerked for Frederick Weisberg of the Superior Court of the District of Columbia from 1992 to 1994.

Prior to becoming a judge, Higashi served as an Assistant United States Attorney from 1994 to 2000. From 2000 to 2003, she was deputy chief and later chief of the Misdemeanor Trials Section of the Superior Court Division. From 2003 to 2018, she served as deputy chief and later chief of the Sex Offense and Domestic Violence Section at the United States Attorney's Office in the District of Columbia. In this role, she investigated and tried criminal cases involving domestic violence and sexual assault cases with adult and child victims. Higashi received the Assistant United States Attorneys Association Harold Sullivan Award in 2016 as well as several United States Attorney's Awards for Special Achievement, the United States Attorney's Justice for Victims of Crime Award, and the United States Attorney's Award for Excellence in Management.

== See also ==
- List of Asian American jurists
