= Errol Rajesh Arthur =

American judge (born 1972)

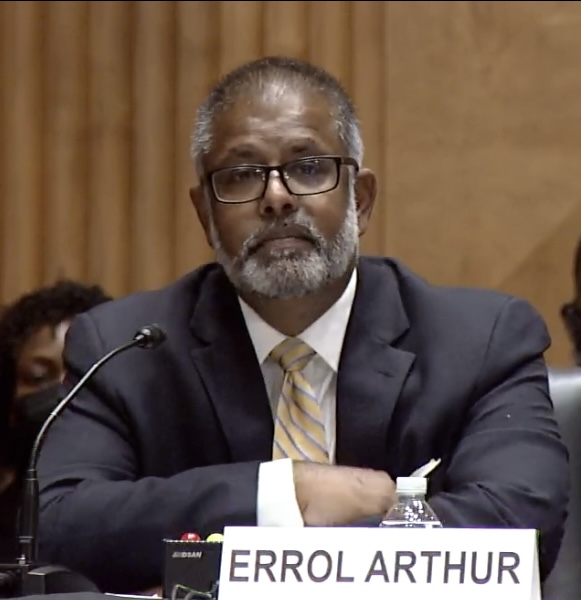

Associate Judge of the Superior Court of the District of Columbia
- Incumbent
- Assumed office January 17, 2023
- Appointed by: Joe Biden
- Preceded by: José M. López

Magistrate Judge of the Superior Court of the District of Columbia
- In office 2010–2023

Personal details
- Born: January 15, 1972 (age 54) Washington, D.C., U.S.
- Education: University of Maryland (BA); Howard University (JD)

Errol Rajesh Arthur (born January 15, 1972) is an American lawyer who has served as an associate judge of the Superior Court of the District of Columbia since 2023. He previously served as a magistrate judge of the same court from 2010 to 2023.

== Education ==
Arthur earned his Bachelor of Arts from the University of Maryland in 1994 and he received his Juris Doctor from the Howard University School of Law in 1998.

== Career ==
Arthur served as a clerk for Judge Mary A. Gooden Terrell on the District of Columbia Superior Court from 1998 to 1999. From 1999 to 2002, he worked as a staff attorney at the Public Defender Service for the District of Columbia. From 2002 to 2010, he was a solo practitioner and then a partner at Arthur & Arthur, P.L.L.C., where he represented clients in criminal, family, and civil matters. From 2010 to 2023, he served as a magistrate judge on the Superior Court of the District of Columbia, serving in the criminal division, domestic violence division, and family court.

=== D.C. superior court service ===
On December 15, 2021, President Joe Biden nominated Arthur to serve as a Judge of the Superior Court of the District of Columbia. President Biden nominated Arthur to the seat vacated by Judge José M. López, whose term subsequently expired on December 31, 2021. On July 12, 2022, a hearing on his nomination was held before the Senate Homeland Security and Governmental Affairs Committee. On September 28, 2022, his nomination was favorably reported out of committee by voice vote en bloc, with Senators Rick Scott and Josh Hawley voting "no" on record. On December 15, 2022, his nomination was confirmed in the Senate by voice vote. He was sworn in on January 17, 2023.

Legal offices
Preceded by José M. López	Judge of the Superior Court of the District of Columbia; 2023–present	Incumbent
