= Alfred S. Irving =

American judge (born 1959)

Senior Judge of the Superior Court of the District of Columbia
- Incumbent
- Assumed office March 21, 2025

Associate Judge of the Superior Court of the District of Columbia
- In office December 3, 2008 – January 24, 2025
- President: George W. Bush
- Preceded by: Mary Ann Gooden Terrell
- Succeeded by: Edward A. O'Connell

Magistrate Judge of the Superior Court of the District of Columbia
- In office July 2007 – December 3, 2008

Personal details
- Born: Alfred Sherwood Irving, Jr. August 7, 1959 (age 66); Charlottesville, Virginia, U.S.
- Education: Wake Forest University (BA); Georgetown University (JD)

Alfred Sherwood Irving Jr. (born August 7, 1959) is senior judge of the Superior Court of the District of Columbia.

== Education ==
Irving earned his Bachelor of Arts from Wake Forest University, and his Juris Doctor from Georgetown University Law Center in 1987.

After graduating, he worked in private practice including at LeBoeuf, Lamb, Greene & MacRae. In 1993, he joined the Justice Department as a trial attorney.

== Career ==
=== D.C. superior court ===
In July 2007, Irving was appointed as a magistrate judge of the Superior Court of the District of Columbia.

President George W. Bush nominated Irving on September 16, 2008, to a 15-year term as an associate judge on the Superior Court of the District of Columbia to the seat vacated by Judge Mary Ann Gooden Terrell. On November 17, 2008, the Senate Committee on Homeland Security and Governmental Affairs held a hearing on his nomination. On November 20, 2008, the Committee reported his nomination favorably to the senate floor and later that day, the full Senate confirmed his nomination by voice vote. He was sworn in on December 3, 2008.
