= Julie H. Becker =

American judge (born 1974)

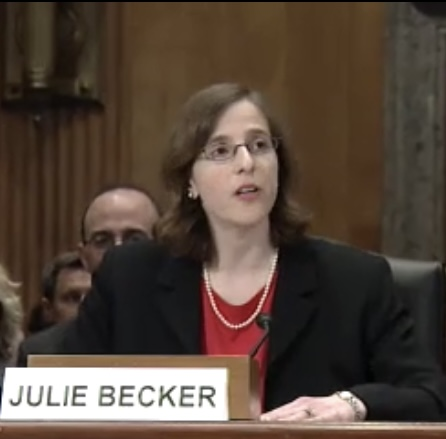

Associate Judge of the Superior Court of the District of Columbia
- Incumbent
- Assumed office September 3, 2016
- President: Barack Obama
- Preceded by: Herbert B. Dixon Jr.

Personal details
- Born: Julie Helene Becker; November 10, 1974 (age 51) Detroit, Michigan, U.S.
- Spouse: Alan Silverleib
- Children: 2
- Education: University of Michigan (BA); Yale University (JD)

Julie Helene Becker (born November 10, 1974) is an American attorney and judge, now associate judge of the Superior Court of the District of Columbia.

== Early life ==
Becker was born in Detroit, Michigan. Becker's father is Allan Becker and her mother is Patricia Becker.

== Education ==
In 1996, Becker earned her Bachelor of Arts degree in history from University of Michigan. In 1999, Becker earned her Juris Doctor from Yale Law School.

== Career ==
In 1999, Becker became a law clerk for then United States Court of Appeals for the Second Circuit Judge Sonia Sotomayor.

In 2000, Becker was chosen as a Skadden Fellow for a two-year program. The fellowship was sponsored by Skadden, Arps, Slate, Meagher & Flom LLP of New York. Becker's project centered on housing law in Washington, DC. In 2000, Becker began her legal career at the Legal Aid Society of the District of Columbia. As a senior staff attorney and later supervising attorney, Becker practiced housing laws. Becker represented hundreds of low-income tenants and tenant associations in their efforts to obtain, improve, and preserve affordable housing.

=== D.C. superior court ===
On April 15, 2015, President Barack Obama nominated Becker to a 15-year term as an associate judge of the Superior Court of the District of Columbia to fill the vacancy created by the retirement of Judge Herbert B. Dixon Jr. On March 2, 2016, the Senate Committee on Homeland Security and Governmental Affairs held a hearing on her nomination. The Senate confirmed her nomination on June 23, 2016, by voice vote.

== Awards and recognitions ==
- 2000 Skadden Fellow. Selected by Skadden, Arps, Slate, Meagher & Flom LLP of New York.
- 2006 National Housing Law Project's Housing Justice Award.
- 2009 D.C.'s Rising Star 40 Under 40. National Law Journal.

== Personal life ==
Becker's husband is Alan Silverleib. They have two daughters.
