= Robert Okun =

American judge

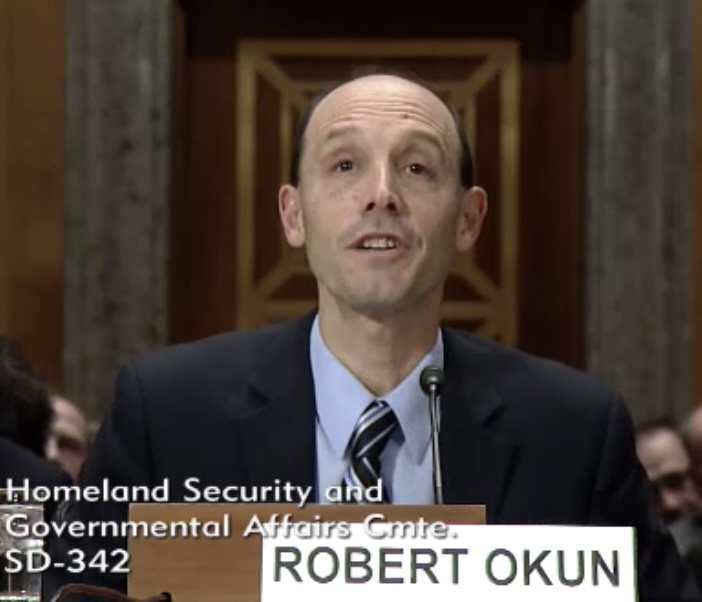

Associate Judge of the Superior Court of the District of Columbia
- Incumbent
- Assumed office November 8, 2013
- President: Barack Obama
- Preceded by: Linda Kay Davis

Personal details
- Born: Robert Daniel Okun; January 6, 1960 (age 65); Great Neck, New York, U.S.
- Education: University of Pennsylvania (BA); Harvard University (JD)

Robert Daniel Okun (born January 6, 1960) is an associate judge of the Superior Court of the District of Columbia.

== Education and career ==
Okun earned his Bachelor of Arts, ‘’magna cum laude,’’ from the University of Pennsylvania in 1981, his Juris Doctor, ‘’cum laude,’’ from the Harvard Law School in 1984.

After graduating, he clerked for Judge Frank E. Schwelb of the Superior Court of the District of Columbia. He had a career in public service working as an attorney for various government departments and later served as Chief of the Special Proceedings Division of the U.S. Attorney's Office for the District of Columbia.

=== D.C. superior court service ===
President Barack Obama nominated Okun on September 20, 2012, to a 15-year term as an associate judge of the Superior Court of the District of Columbia. On November 20, 2012, the Senate Committee on Homeland Security and Governmental Affairs held a hearing on his nomination. His nomination expired on January 3, 2013, following the Adjournment sine die of the United States Congress.

On March 19, 2013, President Barack Obama renominated Okun to the same court to the seat vacated by Linda Kay Davis. On May 22, 2013, the Committee reported his nomination favorably to the Senate floor and on the following day, May 23, 2013, the full Senate confirmed his nomination by voice vote. He was sworn in on November 8, 2013.

==== Notable rulings ====
In 2020, Okun signed off on the early release of Darrell Moore as part of D.C’s Incarnation Reduction Amendment Act despite Moore not completing a number of the Act’s metrics, including earning a high school equivalency diploma behind bars, completing vocational training and having housing and a job lined up. Moore was convicted of first degree murder and sentenced to 66 years to life. Moore was released after serving 26 years and would soon after be indicted for the murder of Julius Hayes.

In 2021, Okun signed off on the early release of Michael Garrett as part of COVID-19-based compassionate release in March. Garrett, of no fixed address, was arrested and charged with assault with intent to kill for the murder of a 71-year-old woman in December 2021.
