= Edward A. O'Connell =

American lawyer

Edward O'Connell

Associate Judge of the Superior Court of the District of Columbia
- Incumbent
- Assumed office October 27, 2025
- Appointed by: Donald Trump
- Preceded by: Alfred S. Irving

Personal details
- Born: Edward Aloysius O'Connell; April 12, 1967 (age 59)
- Education: Catholic University of America (BA); Quinnipiac University School of Law (JD)

Edward Aloysius O'Connell is an American lawyer who is serving as an associate judge of the Superior Court of the District of Columbia.

== Education ==
O'Connell received a Bachelor of Arts degree from the Catholic University of America and a Juris Doctor from Quinnipiac University School of Law.

== Career ==
After law school, O'Connell was a law clerk to Chief Judge Rufus King of the Superior Court of the District of Columbia. He then was an assistant state attorney in Baltimore. He served for nearly two decades as a prosecutor in the Office of the United States Attorney for the District of Columbia, where he prosecuted homicides, felony major crimes, domestic violence, organized crime, and narcotics offenses. He is chief of staff and deputy general counsel of the Office of the Inspector General of the United States Nuclear Regulatory Commission and Defense Nuclear Facilities Safety Board.

=== D.C. superior court service ===
On May 6, 2025, President Donald Trump announced his intent to nominate O'Connell to serve as an associate judge of the Superior Court of the District of Columbia. On May 12, 2025, his nomination was sent to the Senate. President Trump nominated O'Connell to the seat vacated by Judge Alfred S. Irving, who assumed senior status on January 24, 2025. On July 24, 2025, a hearing on his nomination was held before the Senate Homeland Security and Governmental Affairs Committee. On July 30, 2025, his nomination was reported out of the committee by a 15–0 vote. On September 17, 2025, the Senate invoked cloture on his nomination, en bloc, by a 52–47 vote. The next day, his nomination was confirmed, en bloc, by a 51–47 vote. He was sworn in on October 27, 2025.
