= D.W. Tunnage =

American judge (born 1968)

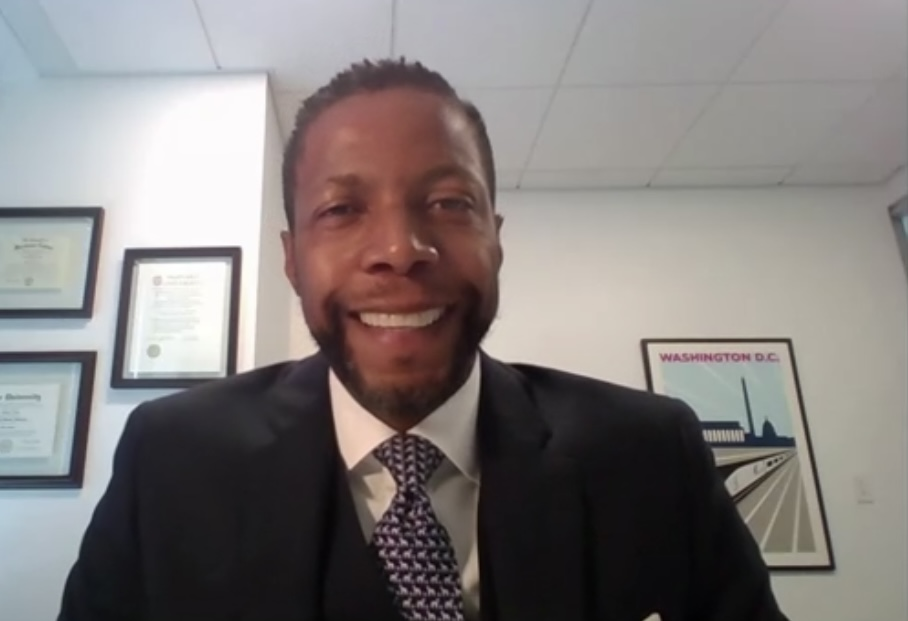

Associate Judge of the Superior Court of the District of Columbia
- Incumbent
- Assumed office February 25, 2022
- Appointed by: Joe Biden
- Preceded by: Russell F. Canan

Personal details
- Born: October 20, 1968 (age 57) Fort Lauderdale, Florida, U.S.
- Education: Morehouse College (BA); Duke University (JD); Harvard University (MPP)

Donald Walker Tunnage (born October 20, 1968) is an American lawyer who has served as an associate judge of the Superior Court of the District of Columbia since 2022.

== Education ==
Tunnage received his Bachelor of Arts, magna cum laude, from Morehouse College in 1990, his Juris Doctor from Duke University Law School in 1992 and his Master of Public Policy from the Harvard Kennedy School in 2000.

== Legal career ==
From 1993 to 1998, he was assistant public defender in Florida's office of the public defender in Miami. From 2000 to 2009, he was a civil trial attorney in the United States Department of Justice Civil Rights Division. From 2009 until 2022, he was a criminal trial attorney in the same division.

== D.C. Superior Court service ==
On September 30, 2021, President Joe Biden nominated Tunnage to serve as a judge of the Superior Court of the District of Columbia. President Biden nominated Tunnage to the seat vacated by Judge Russell F. Canan, whose term expired on February 3, 2018. On November 18, 2021, a hearing on his nomination was held before the Senate Homeland Security and Governmental Affairs Committee. The committee reported Tunnage's nomination to the full Senate on December 1, 2021.

On February 2, 2022, the United States Senate invoked cloture on his nomination by a 57–38 vote. On February 7, 2022, his nomination was confirmed by a 54–39 vote. He was sworn in on February 25, 2022.

Legal offices
Preceded by Russell F. Canan	Judge of the Superior Court of the District of Columbia; 2022–present	Incumbent
