= Yvonne M. Williams =

American judge (born 1972)

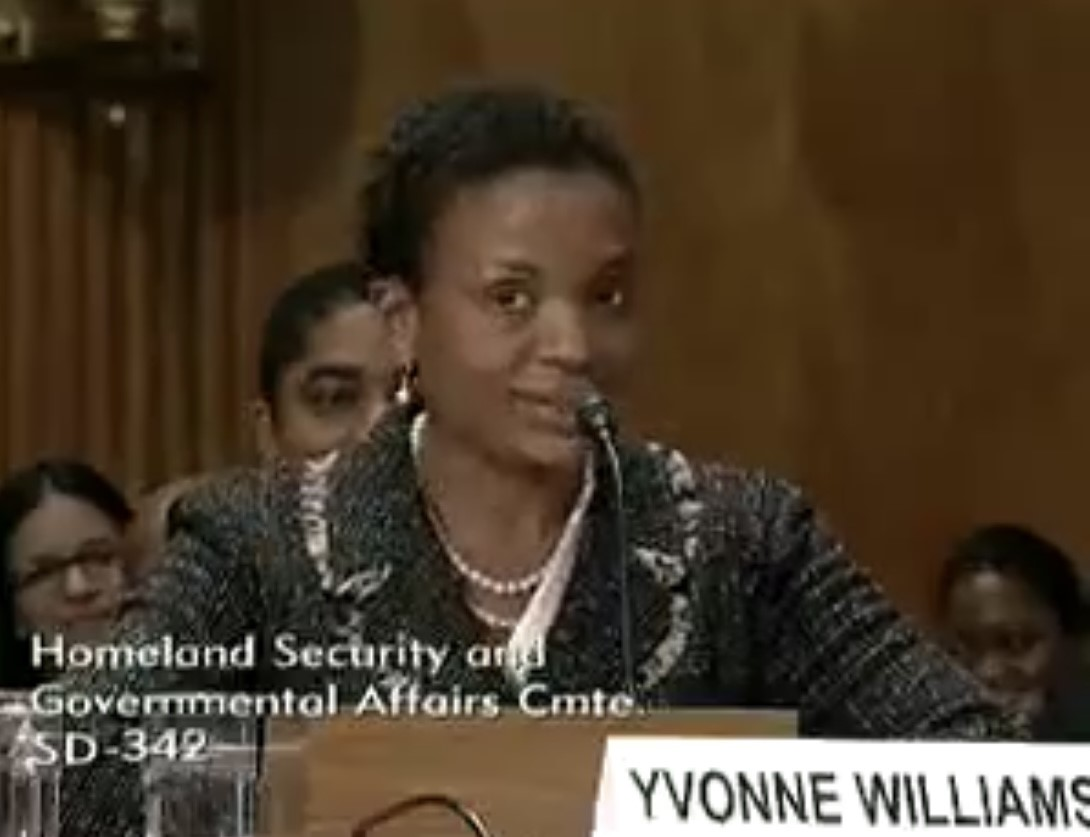

Associate Judge of the Superior Court of the District of Columbia
- Incumbent
- Assumed office December 16, 2011
- President: Barack Obama
- Preceded by: Brook Hedge

Personal details
- Born: Yvonne Michelle Williams; June 13, 1972 (age 53) Detroit, Michigan, U.S.
- Education: University of California, Berkeley (BA); Northeastern University (JD)

Yvonne Michelle Williams (born June 13, 1972) is an associate judge of the Superior Court of the District of Columbia.

== Education and career ==
Williams earned her Bachelor of Arts from University of California at Berkeley in 1994, and her Juris Doctor from Northeastern University School of Law in 1997.

After graduating, she worked as a staff attorney at the NAACP Legal Defense and Educational Fund. In October 1999 she joined the Public Defender Service for the District of Columbia as a trial attorney and in 2005, she went into private practice.

=== D.C. superior court ===
President Barack Obama nominated Williams on February 3, 2011, to a 15-year term as an associate judge of the Superior Court of the District of Columbia to the seat vacated by Brook Hedge. On June 15, 2011, the Senate Committee on Homeland Security and Governmental Affairs held a hearing on her nomination. On June 29, 2011, the Committee reported her nomination favorably to the Senate floor. On August 2, 2011, the full Senate confirmed her nomination by voice vote. She was sworn in on December 16, 2011.
