= Michael Kenny O'Keefe =

American judge (born 1963)

Associate Judge of the Superior Court of the District of Columbia
- Incumbent
- Assumed office June 20, 2013
- President: Barack Obama
- Preceded by: Joan Z. McAvoy

Personal details
- Born: December 2, 1963 (age 61); Glen Cove, New York, U.S.
- Education: University of Notre Dame (BA); American University (JD)

Michael Kenny O'Keefe (born December 2, 1963) is an associate judge of the Superior Court of the District of Columbia.

== Education and career ==
O'Keefe earned his Bachelor of Arts from University of Notre Dame. He earned a Juris Doctor from the Washington College of Law and was an associate editor of The American University Law Review.

While attending law school, O'Keefe worked in the United States Senate as a legislative aide to Senator Christopher J. Dodd. After graduating, he worked for O'Connor & Hannan (now Nossaman LLP). As a lawyer, he has litigated over 200 trials in the D.C. Superior Court and has represented individuals in over 2,000 cases.

=== D.C. Superior Court ===
President Barack Obama nominated O'Keefe on March 19, 2013, to a 15-year term as an associate judge of the Superior Court of the District of Columbia to the seat vacated by Judge Joan Z. McAvoy. On May 15, 2013, the Senate Committee on Homeland Security and Governmental Affairs held a hearing on his nomination. On May 22, 2013, the Committee reported his nomination favorably to the senate floor and on the following day, May 23, 2013, the full Senate confirmed his nomination by voice vote. He was sworn in on June 20, 2013.
