= Justice Lopez =

Justice Lopez may refer to:

- Francisco Rebollo López (1938–2025), associate justice of the Supreme Court of Puerto Rico
- Jhosep Lopez (born 1963), associate justice of the Supreme Court of the Philippines
- John Lopez IV (born 1968), vice chief justice of the Arizona Supreme Court
- Mario Lopez (jurist), (born 1955), associate justice of the Supreme Court of the Philippines

== See also ==
- Judge Lopez (disambiguation)
