= Kenia Seoane Lopez =

American judge (born 1974)

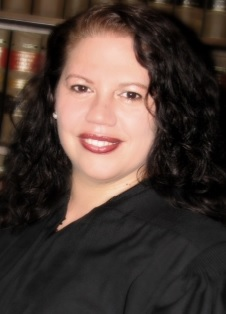

Associate Judge of the Superior Court of the District of Columbia
- Incumbent
- Assumed office February 25, 2022
- Appointed by: Joe Biden
- Preceded by: Ronna Lee Beck

Magistrate Judge of the Superior Court of the District of Columbia
- In office July 2012 – February 25, 2022

Personal details
- Born: January 14, 1974 (age 52) Palma Soriano, Santiago de Cuba Province, Cuba
- Education: Northeastern University (BS); University of Wisconsin–Madison (MA, JD)

Kenia Seoane Lopez (born January 14, 1974) is an American lawyer who has served as an associate judge of the Superior Court of the District of Columbia since 2022. She previously served as a magistrate judge of the same court from 2012 to 2022.

== Early life and education ==
Lopez was born in Santiago de Cuba, Cuba and moved to the United States before her 10th birthday. Lopez earned a Bachelor of Science degree in criminal justice from Northeastern University in 1997, a Master of Arts in Latin American, Caribbean, and Iberian studies from the University of Wisconsin–Madison, and a Juris Doctor from the University of Wisconsin Law School in 2002.

== Career ==
After law school, Lopez was a clerk for the Massachusetts Superior Court. She then joined office of the attorney general for the District of Columbia, working in the legal services division of the child support department. She later served as a bilingual attorney negotiator in the domestic violence division of the Superior Court of the District of Columbia. She was appointed as a magistrate judge of the Superior Court in 2012.

In June 2021, President Joe Biden announced his intent to nominate Lopez as a judge of the Superior Court. On September 14, 2021, a hearing on her nomination was held before the Senate Homeland Security and Governmental Affairs Committee. On October 6, 2021, her nomination was reported out of committee by a voice vote. On February 1, 2022, the United States Senate invoked cloture on her nomination by a 59–38 vote. On February 2, 2022, she was confirmed by a 59–38 vote. She was sworn in on February 25, 2022.

Legal offices
| Preceded by Ronna Lee Beck | Judge of the Superior Court of the District of Columbia; 2022–present | Incumbent |
