= Peter A. Krauthamer =

American judge (born 1957)

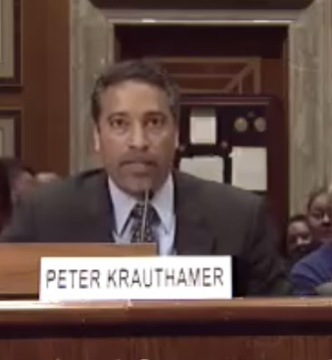

Senior Judge of the Superior Court of the District of Columbia
- Incumbent
- Assumed office 2024

Associate Judge of the Superior Court of the District of Columbia
- In office April 20, 2012 – June 30, 2023
- President: Barack Obama
- Preceded by: John Henry Bayly, Jr.
- Succeeded by: vacant

Personal details
- Born: Peter Arno Krauthamer; September 6, 1957 (age 67); New York City, New York, U.S.
- Spouse: Tanya Chutkan (div)
- Children: 2
- Education: Brandeis University (BA); Boston University (JD)

Peter Arno Krauthamer (born September 6, 1957) is an American jurist. He is a senior judge of the Superior Court of the District of Columbia.

== Education and career ==
Krauthamer earned his Bachelor of Arts from Brandeis University in 1979, and his Juris Doctor from Boston University School of Law in 1982.

After graduating, Krauthamer worked in the Public Defender Service for the District of Columbia as a staff attorney. In 2004, he became the deputy director for the Public Defender Service overseeing a staff of 220 people including 110 attorneys.

From 1995 to 2000, Krauthamer was an assistant professor and clinical supervising attorney at Howard University School of Law.

=== D.C. Superior Court ===
President Barack Obama nominated Krauthamer on July 11, 2011, to a 15-year term as an associate judge of the Superior Court of the District of Columbia to the seat vacated by John Henry Bayly Jr. On November 8, 2011, the Senate Committee on Homeland Security and Governmental Affairs held a hearing on his nomination and on the following day, November 9, 2011, the Committee reported his nomination favorably to the Senate floor. On November 18, 2011, the full Senate confirmed his nomination by voice vote. He was sworn in on April 20, 2012. He retired from the court on June 30, 2023. Starting in May 2024, he was evaluated for an appointment as a senior judge and assumed office later that year.

== Personal life ==
Krauthamer has resided in Washington, D.C., and Silver Spring, Maryland, since 1970. He was formerly married to United States District Court for the District of Columbia Judge Tanya Chutkan. They have two sons.
