= Lee F. Satterfield =

American judge (born 1958)

Lee Satterfield
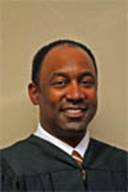
- Satterfield in 2009

Senior Judge of the Superior Court of the District of Columbia
- Incumbent
- Assumed office February 1, 2017

Chief Judge of the Superior Court of the District of Columbia
- In office September 2008 – October 1, 2016
- Preceded by: Rufus G. King III
- Succeeded by: Robert E. Morin

Associate Judge of the Superior Court of the District of Columbia
- In office November 1992 – February 1, 2017
- President: George H. W. Bush
- Preceded by: Robert McCance Scott
- Succeeded by: Sean C. Staples

Personal details
- Born: December 17, 1958 (age 66); Washington D.C., U.S.
- Education: University of Maryland (BA); George Washington University (JD)

Lee F. Satterfield (born December 17, 1958) is a senior judge of the Superior Court of the District of Columbia.

== Education and career ==
Satterfield earned a Bachelor of Arts in Economics from University of Maryland in 1980 and his Juris Doctor from George Washington University Law School in 1983.

After graduating, he served as a law clerk for D.C. Superior Court judge Paul R. Webber, III.

Since 1991, Satterfield taught Criminal Trial Practice and Advanced Criminal Procedure at the Catholic University Columbus School of Law as an adjunct professor for over twenty years.

=== D.C. Superior Court ===
President George H. W. Bush nominated Satterfield on June 19, 1992, to a 15-year term as an associate judge of the Superior Court of the District of Columbia to the seat vacated by Robert McCance Scott. On September 30, 1992, the Senate Committee on Homeland Security and Governmental Affairs held a hearing on his nomination. On October 2, 1992, the committee reported his nomination favorably to the Senate floor. On October 8, 1992, the full Senate confirmed his nomination by voice vote.

In 2008, Satterfield was appointed to a four-year term as chief judge of the D.C. Superior Court. On July 26, 2012, he was reappointed to a second four-year term as chief judge. In 2016, he requested to be appointed to a third term but the Judicial Nomination Commission chose Robert E. Morin as chief judge.

== Personal life ==
Satterfield has been a lifelong resident of Washington D.C.
