= Anthony C. Epstein =

American judge (born 1952)

Senior Judge of the Superior Court of the District of Columbia
- Incumbent
- Assumed office January 11, 2025

Associate Judge of the Superior Court of the District of Columbia
- In office September 8, 2008 – January 11, 2025
- President: George W. Bush
- Preceded by: Susan Rebecca Holmes
- Succeeded by: Sharon Goodie

Personal details
- Born: Anthony Charles Epstein; June 17, 1952 (age 74) New York City, New York, U.S.
- Education: Yale College (BA, JD)

Anthony Charles Epstein (born June 17, 1952) is a senior judge of the Superior Court of the District of Columbia.

== Education and career ==
Epstein earned his Bachelor of Arts from Yale College in 1974, and his Juris Doctor from Yale Law School in 1977.

After graduating, he clerked for Judge Charles B. Renfrew of the United States District Court for the Northern District of California. In 1981, he started working in private practice. He joined Jenner & Block in 1983 and Steptoe & Johnson in 1999.

=== D.C. Superior Court ===
President George W. Bush nominated Epstein on January 9, 2007, to a 15-year term as an associate judge of the Superior Court of the District of Columbia to the seat vacated by Susan Rebecca Holmes. On July 23, 2008, the Senate Committee on Homeland Security and Governmental Affairs held a hearing on his nomination. On July 30, 2008, the Committee reported his nomination favorably to the senate floor. On August 1, 2008, the full Senate confirmed his nomination by voice vote. He was sworn in on September 8, 2008.
