= Miguel Félix López =

Ecuadorian lawyer and teacher

President of Supreme Court of Guaayas
- In office 2002–2004
- Preceded by: Francisco Boloña
- Succeeded by: Gustavo Von Buchwald

Personal details
- Born: April 6, 1939; Calceta, Ecuador
- Spouse(s): Zoila Velásquez (m. 1964; div. 1970) Amparo López (m. 1977; div. 1982) (m. 1985; div. 1987) Eugenia Romero (m. 1993)
- Children: Lenin Arturo, María Consuelo, Paola María, María José, Diana, Michelle Eugenia, Miguel Alberto and Miguel Emilio.
- Parent(s): Quinche Felix; Jacinta Lopez

Luis Miguel Felix Lopez (born Calceta, April 6, 1939) is an Ecuadorian lawyer and teacher, known for his judicial career in Guayas.

== Early Age ==
Miguel was born in Calceta, Manabí Province; as the fifth of the 14 offspring of Quinche Félix and Jacinta López; recognized merchants and politicians in their town. At 12 years old, he moved to Guayaquil, and early radicated in the Gómez Rendón and Chile streets, and moved to other locations later. He began to study in the Cristobal Colon and Tarqui Colleges and he incorporated as Doctor in Jurisprudence in the Guayaquil University.

== Judicial career ==
His first labor in the Judicial Function was as amanuensis in the juvenile court, later he began to work as First Judge of the Criminal in Guayaquil, and in the 90s he ascend to the Third Criminal Court. In 2002 he was called by the Ecuadorian Supreme Court of Justice to contest for the presidency of the Guayas Superior Court of Justice. In his labor as president, he has a conflict with the president Lucio Gutiérrez, who said that "the courts should be burned", phrase that was rejected by Félix López who explained Gutiérrez that his expressions were offenses that can be punished.

He was at office until 2004, returning to his rank as Criminal Judge, and was encharged for the presidency of the Guayas Court sporadically. He retired as of 2009.

== After the Superior Court ==
In 2011 he began to work for the UEES in Samborondón.

In 2018, after the Referendum and popular consultation the Transitory Citizen Participation and Social Control Council, designed a Transitory Judiciary Council to reform the National Judicial Function and for the designation of new authorities. Félix was seen with María Leonor Jiménez and the president of the Council Aquiles Rigail, when he visits the Provincial Court of Guayas in the Contest of the Ecuadorian public attorneys.
