= Robert E. Morin =

American judge (born 1953)

Senior Judge of the Superior Court of the District of Columbia
- Incumbent
- Assumed office September 30, 2020

7th Chief Judge of the Superior Court of the District of Columbia
- In office October 1, 2016 – September 30, 2020
- Preceded by: Lee F. Satterfield
- Succeeded by: Anita Josey-Herring

Associate Judge of the Superior Court of the District of Columbia
- In office July 30, 1996 – September 30, 2020
- Nominated by: Bill Clinton
- Preceded by: Curtis E. von Kann
- Succeeded by: John Timmer

Personal details
- Born: January 9, 1953 (age 73) Boston, Massachusetts, U.S.
- Spouse: Martha
- Children: 2
- Education: University of Massachusetts; Catholic University Law School (JD)

Robert E. Morin (born January 9, 1953) is an American lawyer and a senior judge of the Superior Court of the District of Columbia.

== Early life and education ==
Morin was born on January 9, 1953, in Boston, Massachusetts. In 1974, Morin graduated with a degree in sociology from University of Massachusetts and in 1977 with a Juris Doctor degree from Catholic University Law School.

== Career ==
Morin worked in private practice from 1977-1996.

Morin has been teaching at Georgetown Law Center as an adjunct professor since 1986.

On December 18, 1995, President Bill Clinton nominated Morin to a fifteen-year term as an associate judge of the Superior Court of the District of Columbia to the seat vacated by Curtis E. von Kann. On March 25, 1996, a hearing was held before the Senate Committee on Governmental Affairs. On July 26, 1996, the United States Senate confirmed his nomination by voice vote. He was sworn in on July 30, 1996. In 2011, he was reappointed for another fifteen-year term, expiring in 2026.

On June 16, 2016, following a thorough selection, the Judicial Nomination Commission announced that it has chosen Morin to serve as the next chief judge of the Superior Court of the District of Columbia.

In April 2020, Morin announced that he plans to retire in September.

== Personal life ==
Morin lives in Washington, D.C. and is married to Martha Tomich. They have two children.
