= Superior Court of the District of Columbia =

Trial court for the District of Columbia

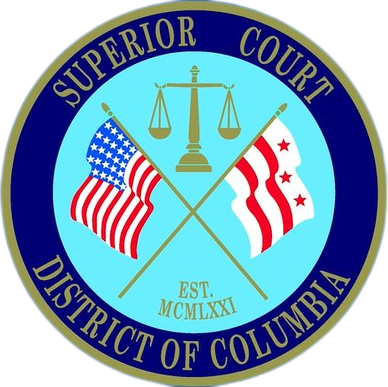
- Interactive map of Superior Court of the District of Columbia
- Established: 1970
- Location: H. Carl Moultrie Courthouse, Judiciary Square, Washington, D.C.
- Appeals to: District of Columbia Court of Appeals
- Number of positions: 62 judges (including chief judge)
- Website: dccourts.gov/superior-court

Chief Judge
- Currently: Milton C. Lee
- Since: October 1, 2024

U.S. Marshal
- Currently: Robert Anthony Dixon
- Since: December 5, 2019

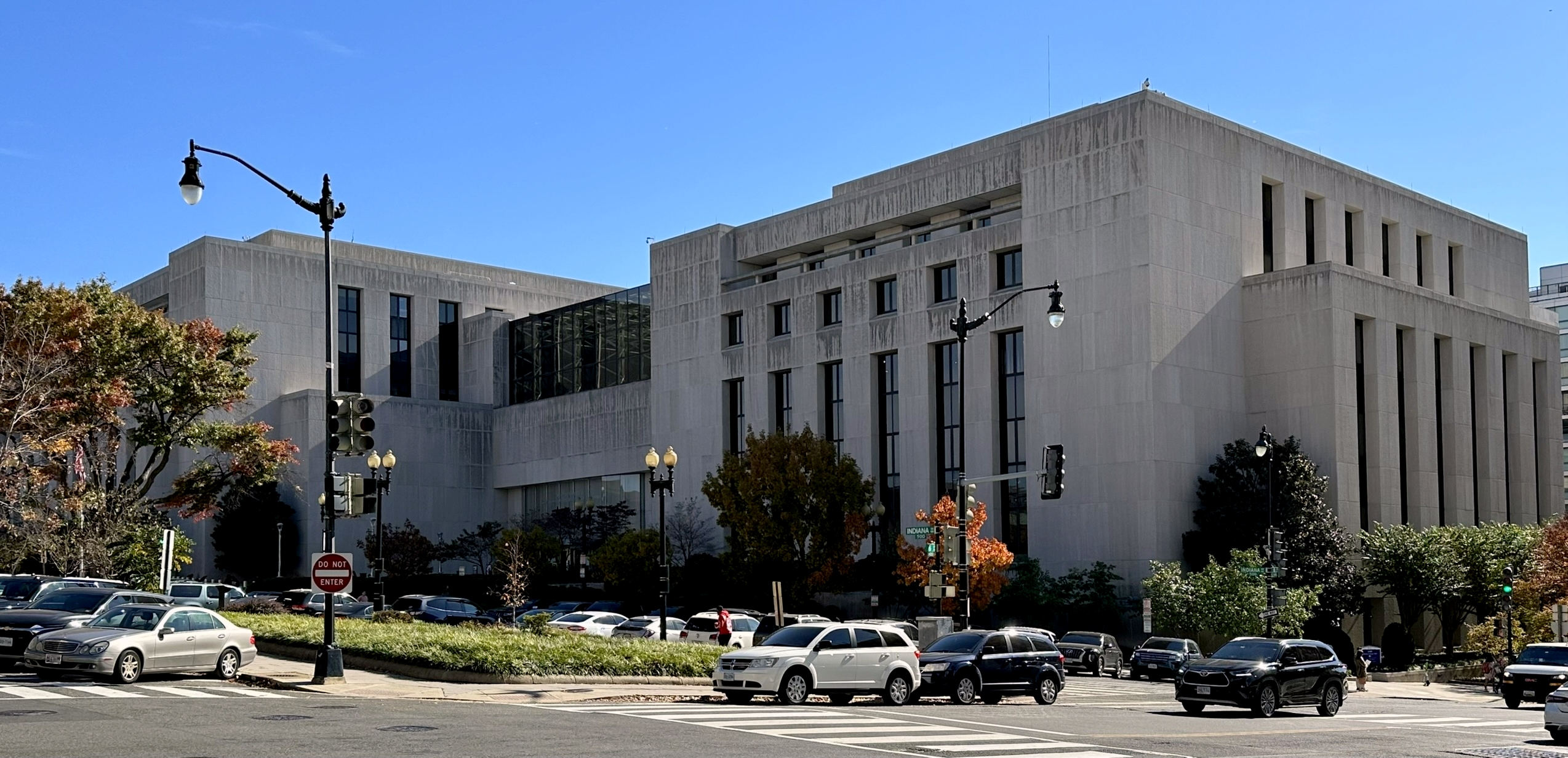
H. Carl Moultrie Courthouse in 2023

The Superior Court of the District of Columbia, commonly referred to as DC Superior Court, is the local (non-federal) trial court for the District of Columbia, in the United States. It hears cases involving criminal, civil law, family court, landlord, tenant, probate, tax, and driving violations. All appeals of Superior Court decisions go to the District of Columbia Court of Appeals though magistrate judge opinions are first appealed to a Superior Court Associate Judge.

== History ==
=== 19th century ===
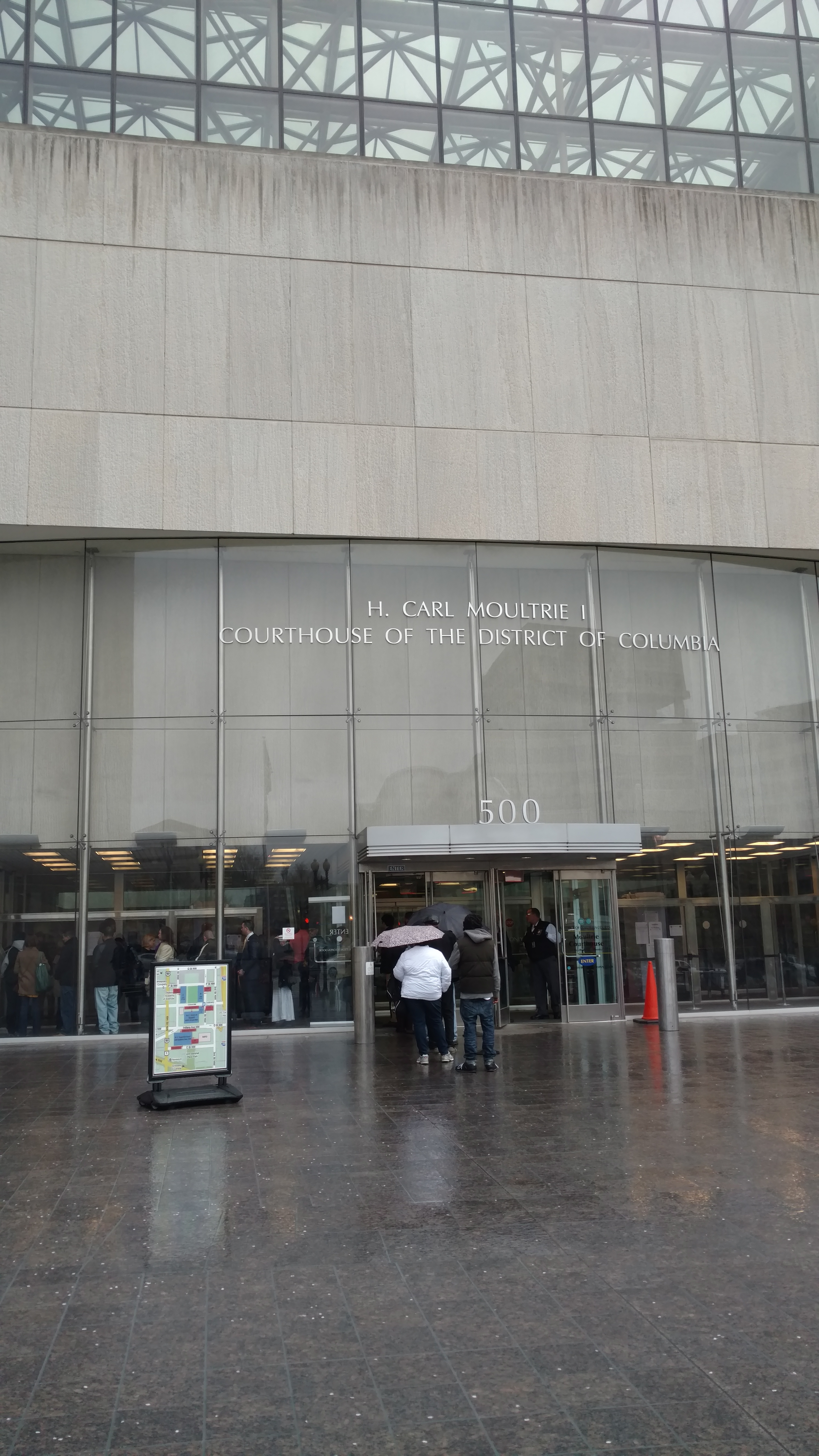
The court's main entrance on Indiana Avenue

The first judicial systems in the new District of Columbia were established by the United States Congress in 1801. The Circuit Court of the District of Columbia (not to be confused with the United States Court of Appeals for the District of Columbia Circuit, which it later evolved into) was both a trial court of general jurisdiction and an appellate court, and it heard cases under both local and federal law. Congress also established justices of the peace and an orphans' court, which were combined in 1870 into a new local court, called the Police Court, which had jurisdiction over misdemeanors (concurrently with the federal courts) as well as equity powers.

=== 20th century ===
In 1909, Congress converted the Police Court into the Municipal Court, which became a court of record with jury trials in 1921. In 1963, Congress again converted the Municipal Court into the Court of General Sessions. Its jurisdiction was broader, although the federal courts retained concurrent jurisdiction in criminal cases. Under the District of Columbia Court Reform and Criminal Procedure Act of 1970, the Court of General Sessions was combined with the Juvenile Court, established in 1906, and D.C. Tax Court, established as the local Board of Tax Appeals in 1937, to form the Superior Court of the District of Columbia, a trial court of general and mostly exclusive jurisdiction for D.C.

=== 21st century ===
As of the 21st century, the court consists of a chief judge and 61 associate judges. The court is assisted by the service of 24 magistrate judges and retired judges who have been recommended and approved as senior judges. When a vacancy occurs on the court, the District of Columbia Judicial Nomination Commission invites applications. It sends three candidates' names to the President of the United States, who sends one nomination to the U.S. Senate for advice and consent. A judge who is confirmed by the Senate serves for a 15-year term, which is renewable. The Superior Court and the D.C. Court of Appeals, known collectively as the D.C. Courts, comprise the judicial branch of the D.C. local government.

In criminal cases, the government is represented by the Office of the United States Attorney for the District of Columbia or the Office of the Attorney General for the District of Columbia, depending on the nature and severity of the charges.

== Organizational units ==
- Civil Division – Civil actions and actions in equity; handles temporary restraining orders other than those involving domestic violence.
  - Civil Actions Branch – Amount in controversy above $10,000 or cases requesting equitable relief such as declarative judgments, injunctive relief, writs of attachment
  - Landlord and Tenant Branch – processes cases filed for possession of real property or violations of lease agreements. The Landlord-Tenant Resource Center can assist those who do not have an attorney. It is located in Room 115 of Court Building B (510 Fourth Street, NW) and is open weekdays, from 9:15 to noon.
  - Small Claims and Conciliation Branch – Amount in controversy $10,000 and below. There is a Small Claims Resource Center to assist those without an attorney. It is located in Court Building B, Room 102, and is open from 9:15 to noon on Thursdays.
  - Housing Conditions Calendar handles cases in which landlords are alleged to have not kept their rental property compliant with the D.C. Housing Code.
- Criminal Division – This division handles cases including misdemeanor, felony, and serious traffic offenses. The division also has Community Courts, which take a problem-solving approach to misdemeanor crimes, a drug court, and a mental health court.
- Family Court Operations Division – Family court
  - Family Court Central Intake Center (CIC) – all cases are filed here.
  - Domestic Relations Branch – divorce, legal separation, annulment, child custody, habeas corpus, and adoption
  - Juvenile and Neglect Branch – juvenile delinquency, child abuse and neglect.
  - Paternity and Child Support Branch – establishment of paternity, child support, and wage withholding
  - Marriage Bureau – marriage licenses/records; applications to perform marriage ceremonies in the District of Columbia by authorized ministers and others
  - Mental Health and Habilitation Branch – "hospitalization and continued treatment of persons adjudicated as intellectually disabled or in need of mental health services"
  - Counsel for Child Abuse and Neglect Branch is responsible for determining party eligibility for court-appointed counsel in child abuse and neglect proceedings and processes the appointment of attorneys for parties in these cases.
  - Family Court Self Help Center – "provides legal information and assistance to self-represented parties in Family Court Cases."
  - Family Treatment Court –"court-supervised, voluntary, comprehensive residential substance abuse treatment program for mothers/female caretakers whose children are the subject of a child neglect case."
- Domestic Violence Division – Domestic violence – Handles cases of violence by a family member or romantic partner, a person who shares living quarters, with whom one has a child in common, or between a former and current romantic partner. There are two intake centers: 1) the fourth floor of the Moultrie Courthouse, 2) the Medical Center at 1328 Southern Avenue, Suite 311. At either location, those seeking a protection order can meet with police/prosecutor, advocate, file a petition for a stay-away order and/or custody, seek the assistance of the Crime Victims Compensation Program, and talk with an advocate to develop a safety plan.
- Probate Division/Office of the Register of Wills – handles matters relating to estates of those who have died, guardianships and conservatorships for incapacitated adults, and other such matters.
  - Probate Resource Center – those without an attorney can consult volunteer attorneys about probate matters at the Probate Resource Center in Room 316 of Court Building A (515 Fifth Street, NW) 8:30 to 3:30 Monday through Friday.
- Tax Division – Appeals and petitions for review of assessments made by the District of Columbia, as well as all proceedings brought by the District of Columbia for the imposition of criminal penalties according to the provisions of the District of Columbia Code
- Family Court Social Services Division – This division supervises juveniles who are awaiting trial on juvenile charges or who are on probation after pleading or being found involved in a crime.
- Multi-Door Dispute Resolution Division – Mediation and alternative dispute resolution services for those with court cases, as well as a Community Information Referral Program for disputes that have not yet resulted in a lawsuit being filed.
- Special Operations Division
  - Jurors Office
  - Child Care Center
  - Judge-in-Chambers
  - Office of Court Interpreting Services

== Active judges ==
As of September 14, 2026:

Title	Judge	Born	First term began	Current term ends	Began senior status	First appointed by
Chief Judge	Milton C. Lee	1960	2010	2040	—	Obama
Associate Judge	Neal E. Kravitz	1957	October 21, 1998	2028	—	Clinton
Associate Judge	Erik Christian	1960	July 20, 2001	2031	—	G.W. Bush
Associate Judge	Robert Rigsby	1960	October 11, 2002	2032	—	G.W. Bush
Associate Judge	Michael Ryan	1957	January 16, 2004	2033	—	G.W. Bush
Associate Judge	Laura Cordero	1965	September 2, 2005	2035	—	G.W. Bush
Associate Judge	Juliet J. McKenna	1970	December 16, 2005	2035	—	G.W. Bush
Associate Judge	Marisa Demeo	1966	May 10, 2010	2040	—	Obama
Associate Judge	Todd E. Edelman	1968	October 4, 2010	2040	—	Obama
Associate Judge	Maribeth Raffinan	1970	October 29, 2010	2040	—	Obama
Associate Judge	Jennifer A. Di Toro	1967	October 14, 2011	2026	—	Obama
Associate Judge	Yvonne M. Williams	1972	December 16, 2011	2026	—	Obama
Associate Judge	John F. McCabe	1958	February 24, 2012	2027	—	Obama
Associate Judge	Danya Dayson	1972	April 27, 2012	2027	—	Obama
Associate Judge	Michael Kenny O'Keefe	1963	June 20, 2013	2028	—	Obama
Associate Judge	Robert Okun	1960	November 8, 2013	2028	—	Obama
Associate Judge	Steven M. Wellner	1959	February 19, 2016	2031	—	Obama
Associate Judge	Robert A. Salerno	1961	March 11, 2016	2031	—	Obama
Associate Judge	Darlene M. Soltys	1965	March 18, 2016	2031	—	Obama
Associate Judge	Elizabeth Carroll Wingo	1970	August 26, 2016	2031	—	Obama
Associate Judge	Julie H. Becker	1974	September 3, 2016	2031	—	Obama
Associate Judge	Kelly Higashi	1962	October 26, 2018	2033	—	Trump
Associate Judge	Carmen G. McLean	1976	May 3, 2019	2034	—	Trump
Associate Judge	Shana Frost Matini	1970	August 2019	2034	—	Trump
Associate Judge	Jason Park	1979	August 2019	2034	—	Trump
Associate Judge	Rainey R. Brandt	1966	September 16, 2019	2034	—	Trump
Associate Judge	Deborah J. Israel	1964	November 2019	2034	—	Trump
Associate Judge	Andrea L. Hertzfeld	1979	November 2019	2034	—	Trump
Associate Judge	D.W. Tunnage	1968	February 25, 2022	2037	—	Biden
Associate Judge	Sean C. Staples	1969	February 25, 2022	2037	—	Biden
Associate Judge	Kenia Seoane Lopez	1974	February 25, 2022	2037	—	Biden
Associate Judge	Ebony M. Scott	1978	February 25, 2022	2037	—	Biden
Associate Judge	Leslie Meek	1965	January 17, 2023	2038	—	Biden
Associate Judge	Errol Rajesh Arthur	1972	January 17, 2023	2038	—	Biden
Associate Judge	Veronica M. Sanchez	1974	January 17, 2023	2038	—	Biden
Associate Judge	Kendra D. Briggs	1974	January 17, 2023	2038	—	Biden
Associate Judge	Carl Ezekiel Ross	1977	January 17, 2023	2038	—	Biden
Associate Judge	Laura Crane	1981	January 17, 2023	2038	—	Biden
Associate Judge	Adrienne Jennings Noti	1974	March 25, 2024	2039	—	Biden
Associate Judge	Tanya Jones Bosier	1973	June 21, 2024	2039	—	Biden
Associate Judge	Judith E. Pipe	1980	June 21, 2024	2039	—	Biden
Associate Judge	Katherine E. Oler	1972	July 29, 2024	2039	—	Biden
Associate Judge	Danny Lam Nguyen	1979	July 29, 2024	2039	—	Biden
Associate Judge	Charles J. Willoughby Jr.	1978	August 19, 2024	2039	—	Biden
Associate Judge	Edward A. O'Connell	1967	October 27, 2025	2040	—	Trump
Associate Judge	Stephen F. Rickard	—	January 20, 2026	2040	—	Trump
Associate Judge	Elena S. Suttenberg	—	January 20, 2026	2040	—	Trump
Associate Judge	John Cuong Truong	—	January 20, 2026	2040	—	Trump
Associate Judge	Christopher De Bono	—	September 14, 2026	2041	—	Trump
Associate Judge	Michael DiLorenzo	—	September 14, 2026	2041	—	Trump
Associate Judge	Sharon Goodie	—	September 14, 2026	2041	—	Trump
Associate Judge	Craig Leen	—	September 14, 2026	2041	—	Trump
Associate Judge	Christine Macey	—	September 14, 2026	2041	—	Trump
Associate Judge	John Timmer	—	September 14, 2026	2041	—	Trump
Associate Judge	seat vacant	—	—	—	—	—
Associate Judge	seat vacant	—	—	—	—	—
Associate Judge	seat vacant	—	—	—	—	—
Associate Judge	seat vacant	—	—	—	—	—
Associate Judge	seat vacant	—	—	—	—	—
Associate Judge	seat vacant	—	—	—	—	—
Associate Judge	seat vacant	—	—	—	—	—
Associate Judge	seat vacant	—	—	—	—	—
Senior Judge	Frederick H. Weisberg	1944	1977	—	March 22, 2018	Carter
Senior Judge	Robert I. Richter	1947	1984	—	October 2, 2014	Reagan
Senior Judge	Herbert B. Dixon Jr.	1946	1985	—	April 28, 2015	Reagan
Senior Judge	Harold L. Cushenberry Jr.	1950	1986	—	December 16, 2015	Reagan
Senior Judge	Cheryl M. Long	1949	1988	—	December 4, 2009	Reagan
Senior Judge	Kaye K. Christian	1953	1990	—	December 4, 2010	G.H.W. Bush
Senior Judge	Patricia A. Wynn	1945	1990	—	2002	G.H.W. Bush
Senior Judge	Zinora Mitchell-Rankin	1956	January 12, 1990	—	February 29, 2012	G.H.W. Bush
Senior Judge	Gregory Mize	1946	March 7, 1990	—	March 12, 2002	G.H.W. Bush
Senior Judge	Lee F. Satterfield	1958	1992	—	February 1, 2017	G.H.W. Bush
Senior Judge	Russell F. Canan	1950	August 8, 1993	—	February 3, 2018	Clinton
Senior Judge	Zoe Bush	1954	July 18, 1994	—	October 27, 2017	Clinton
Senior Judge	Rhonda Reid Winston	1954	July 18, 1994	—	September 30, 2016	Clinton
Senior Judge	Judith Bartnoff	1949	August 1, 1994	—	September 13, 2019	Clinton
Senior Judge	Ronna Lee Beck	1947	May 26, 1995	—	January 8, 2021	Clinton
Senior Judge	Robert E. Morin	1953	July 30, 1996	—	September 30, 2020	Clinton
Senior Judge	John M. Campbell	1953	November 11, 1997	—	2024	Clinton
Senior Judge	Anita Josey-Herring	1960	November 11, 1997	—	October 1, 2024	Clinton
Senior Judge	Natalia Combs Greene	1954	October 21, 1998	—	September 30, 2013	Clinton
Senior Judge	Hiram E. Puig-Lugo	1961	June 6, 1999	—	2023	Clinton
Senior Judge	Thomas J. Motley	1954	July 6, 2000	—	October 27, 2017	Clinton
Senior Judge	Gerald Fisher	1950	January 15, 2001	—	August 31, 2022	Clinton
Senior Judge	Craig Iscoe	1953	January 5, 2004	—	January 13, 2026	G.W. Bush
Senior Judge	Jennifer M. Anderson	1959	October 27, 2006	—	March 22, 2024	G.W. Bush
Senior Judge	Anthony C. Epstein	1952	September 8, 2008	—	January 11, 2025	G.W. Bush
Senior Judge	Alfred S. Irving	1959	December 3, 2008	—	March 21, 2025	G.W. Bush
Senior Judge	Judith Anne Smith	1963	October 17, 2010	—	2022	Obama
Senior Judge	Peter A. Krauthamer	1957	April 20, 2012	—	2024	Obama
Senior Judge	Kimberley S. Knowles	1970	November 9, 2012	—	2026	Obama

== Vacancies and pending nominations ==
Vacator	Reason	Vacancy Date	Nominee	Nomination Date
Peter A. Krauthamer	Senior status	June 30, 2023	Fernando Campoamor-Sanchez	November 9, 2026
Hiram E. Puig-Lugo	Senior status	July 28, 2023	Bernard M. Desrosiers	November 10, 2026
Jennifer M. Anderson	Senior status	March 22, 2024	Roman Chaban	November 9, 2026
Rupa Ranga Puttagunta	Resignation	April 12, 2024	–	–
Anita Josey-Herring	Senior status	October 1, 2024	Eric Glover	November 9, 2026
Maurice A. Ross	Resignation	February 27, 2026	–	–
Lynn Leibovitz	Death	June 11, 2026	–	–
James Crowell	Elevation	August 26, 2026	–	–
John F. McCabe	Term expiration	November 28, 2026	–	–
