= Women's Bar Association of the District of Columbia =

Coordinates: 38.900389°N 77.045734°W

- Type: Bar association
- Region served: Washington, D.C.
- Website: https://wbadc.org/

The Women’s Bar Association of the District of Columbia (WBA or Association) is a voluntary bar association in metropolitan Washington, D.C. The WBA has more than 800 members and was founded in 1917.

== Leadership and governance ==
The WBA is led by a Board of Directors that is elected by the general membership each year. Board Members generally serve three-year terms and officers serve one-year terms. A large part of the WBA’s programming and initiative work is carried out by its numerous Committees and Forums. The Co-Chairs of the Committees and Forum organize events and networking opportunities, and support the community of women attorneys and its allies.

== Programming and events ==
The WBA's Committees and Forums develop and organize a wide variety of dynamic programming. WBA programs include discussions about substantive legal issues, practice development, career development, and matters of general concern to all women. These programs feature experts, authors, dignitaries, and government officials, many of whom are WBA members.

In July 2020, the WBA hosted an event called "Where are the Black Women Lawyers in Leadership Positions?" in collaboration with he Greater Washington Area Chapter, Women Lawyers Division, National Bar Association (GWAC).

The Annual Dinner is held each year in May at the National Building Museum. Typically, more than 600 people attend from a variety of practice areas, law firms, government agencies, and other professional backgrounds. The proceeds from the evening support the ongoing efforts of the WBA and the WBA Foundation.

The Stars of the Bar Fall Networking Reception hosts more than 300 people. During the event the WBA honors stars of the legal community and provides an opportunity for learning about WBA programs and services, with networking stations for each committee and forum to discuss upcoming programming in various attorney interests and fields of law.

Registration to attend WBA events is available on the WBA website.

== Publications ==
The WBA publishes a quarterly newsletter called "Raising the Bar" that features content produced by its membership.

== Advocacy ==
The WBA uses issue statements, endorsements, and initiatives to advance the interests of women lawyers. The issue statements are on topics ranging from equal pay to domestic violence to the Equal Rights Amendment. The WBA endorses executive and judicial nominees who request the support and are then vetted by the WBA.

== Awards and honors ==
The WBA bestows various recognition awards: Woman Lawyer of the Year; Janet Reno Torchbearer Award; the Mussey-Gillett Shining Star Award and Stars of the Bar.

=== Janet Reno Torchbearer Award recipients ===
- 2016 Honorable Loretta E. Lynch
- 2012 Sheila Bair
- 2011 Dovey Johnson Roundtree
- 2008 Justice Ruth Bader Ginsburg
- 2007 Judith Areen
- 2001 Honorable Wilma Lewis
- 1998 Honorable Eleanor Holmes Norton
- 1997 Justice Sandra Day O'Connor
- 1996 Honorable Janet Reno

=== Woman Lawyer of the Year Award recipients ===
- 2024 Ellen Jakovic
- 2023 Jo-Ann Wallace
- 2022 Anita Josey-Herring
- 2021 Grace E. Speights
- 2020 Jeannie Rhee
- 2019 Laurie Robinson Haden
- 2018 Hon Anna Blackburne-Rigsby
- 2017 Ana C. Reyes
- 2016 LTG Flora Darpino
- 2015 Judith Scott
- 2014 Judy Smith
- 2013 Hon. Vanessa Ruiz
- 2012 Katia Garrett
- 2011 Sherri N. Blount and Debra L. Lee
- 2010 Nancy Duff Campbell
- 2009 Justice Elena Kagan
- 2008 Mary Kennard
- 2007 Kim M. Keenan
- 2006 Judith Miller
- 2005 Hon. Noel Anketell Kramer
- 2004 Cory M. Amron
- 2003 Hon. Annice M. Wagner
- 2002 Carolyn Lamm
- 2001 Hon. Delissa Ridgeway
- 2000 Eleanor Acheson
- 1999 Patricia D. Gurne
- 1998 Hon. Norma Holloway Johnson
- 1997 Judith Winston
- 1996 Marcia Greenberger
- 1995 Pauline Schneider
- 1994 Justice Ruth Bader Ginsburg
- 1993 Jamie S. Gorelick
- 1992 Elizabeth Dole
- 1992 Elaine Ruth Jones
- 1992 Hon. Patricia McGowan Wald
- 1991 Sara-Ann Determan
- 1990 Hon. Judith Rogers
- 1989 Judith Lichtman
- 1988 Patricia Price Bailey
- 1987 Betty S. Murphy
- 1986 Jean Ramsay Bower
- 1985 Marna S. Tucker
- 1984 Hon. Patricia McGowan Wald
- 1983 Hon. Gladys Kessler
- 1982 Florence King
- 1981 Brooksley Born
- 1980 Hon. Helen Nies
- 1980 Hon. Edna G. Parker
- 1979 Hon. Joyce Hens Green
- 1978 Jean Dwyer
- 1977 Suzanne V. Richards
- 1976 Ruth Hankins-Nesbitt
- 1975 Hon. Roslyn Bell
- 1974 A. Patricia Frohman
- 1973 Margaret A. Haywood
- 1973 Louise O'Neil
- 1971 Margaret H. Brass
- 1970 Catherine B. Kelly
- 1969 Burnita Shelton Matthews
- 1968 Una Rita Morris Quenstedt
- 1967 Elizabeth Bunten
- 1966 Hon. June L. Green
- 1965 Marguerite Rawalt
