= Michael W. Farrell =

American judge (born 1938)

Senior Judge of the District of Columbia Court of Appeals
- In office January 23, 2009 – January 23, 2019

Associate Judge of the District of Columbia Court of Appeals
- In office 1989 – June 30, 2008
- Nominated by: George H. W. Bush
- Preceded by: William C. Pryor
- Succeeded by: Kathryn A. Oberly

Personal details
- Born: July 13, 1938 (age 88) West Orange, New Jersey
- Education: University of Notre Dame (B.A.); Columbia University (M.A.); American University (J.D.)

Michael William Farrell (born July 14, 1938) is a former judge of the District of Columbia Court of Appeals, the highest court for the District of Columbia. He was appointed to the court in 1989, took senior status in 2008, and retired in 2019.

Born and raised in West Orange, New Jersey, Farrell graduated from the University of Notre Dame with a Bachelor of Arts in English in 1960 and received his Master of Arts in German from Columbia University in 1966. Before law school he was a high school teacher and chair of the English Department at Georgetown Preparatory School. After graduating from American University's Washington College of Law, Farrell clerked for a judge on the Maryland Court of Special Appeals and worked as a prosecutor at the United States Department of Justice Criminal Division and the United States Attorney's office for the District of Columbia. He served as chief of the appellate division at the U.S. Attorney's office from 1982 to 1989, when, like his predecessors Frank Q. Nebeker and John A. Terry and his successors John R. Fisher and Roy W. McLeese, he was nominated to the D.C. Court of Appeals. After taking senior status in 2008, he continued to hear cases until his retirement in January 2019.

== Sources ==
- Gellman, Barton (November 11, 1988). "Three Names Forwarded for D.C. Court of Appeals, But No Action Expected Soon". The Washington Post.
