= George R. Gallagher =

Senior judge of the District of Columbia Court of Appeals

Senior Judge of the District of Columbia Court of Appeals
- In office 1981–2001

Associate Judge of the District of Columbia Court of Appeals
- In office 1968–1981
- Nominated by: Lyndon B. Johnson
- Succeeded by: James A. Belson

Personal details
- Born: April 10, 1915 New Haven, Connecticut
- Died: February 4, 2007 (aged 91) Comus, Maryland
- Spouse: Judith Kuertz Gallagher
- Children: Christopher R. Gallagher, Mary Elizabeth Gallagher
- Education: George Washington University (B.A.); Catholic University of America (J.D.)

George R. Gallagher (April 10, 1915 – February 4, 2007) was a judge of the District of Columbia Court of Appeals.

Gallagher was born in New Haven, Connecticut, and moved with his mother and four siblings to the Tenleytown neighborhood of Washington, D.C., in the 1920s. He graduated from George Washington University and the Columbus School of Law at the Catholic University of America. Before and after World War II he worked at the United States Department of Justice Criminal Division, serving in the United States Army during the war. In 1952, Gallagher became general counsel of the Subversive Activities Control Board. He entered private practice in 1959 and worked as an advance man for the presidential campaigns of John F. Kennedy and Lyndon B. Johnson. In 1967, President Johnson nominated him for the D.C. Court of Appeals, and in 1968 he was confirmed.

In 1980, Gallagher was one of several more conservative judges, led by Frank Q. Nebeker, who attempted unsuccessfully to prevent the reappointment as chief judge of Theodore R. Newman, Jr. According to the Washington Post, Gallagher had a reputation as a centrist judge over the course of his tenure. In 1981 he took senior status, and in 2001 he retired from the court entirely. He died at age 91 on his farm in Comus, Maryland.
