= James A. Belson =

American judge

Senior Judge of the District of Columbia Court of Appeals
- In office 1991–2017

Associate Judge of the District of Columbia Court of Appeals
- In office 1981–1991
- Nominated by: Ronald Reagan
- Preceded by: George R. Gallagher
- Succeeded by: Emmet G. Sullivan

Judge of the Superior Court of the District of Columbia
- In office 1968–1981
- Nominated by: Lyndon Johnson
- Succeeded by: Ronald P. Wertheim

Personal details
- Born: September 23, 1931 (age 94) Milwaukee, Wisconsin
- Spouse: Rosemary Greenslade Belson (d. 2014)
- Education: Georgetown University (B.A., J.D.)

James A. Belson (born September 23, 1931) is a former judge of the Superior Court of the District of Columbia and the District of Columbia Court of Appeals.

== Early life ==
Born in Milwaukee, Wisconsin and raised in Washington, D.C., Belson graduated from Gonzaga College High School in 1949. In the 1950s, he earned bachelor's and law degrees from Georgetown University where he was a member of the Philodemic Society, and worked as a law clerk for prominent D.C. lawyer Edward Bennett Williams and federal appeals judge E. Barrett Prettyman. He spent three years in the United States Army as a JAG and then returned to Washington, where he became a partner at Hogan & Hartson.

== Career ==
In 1968, President Lyndon Johnson appointed Belson to the District of Columbia Court of General Sessions, which became the Superior Court of the District of Columbia in 1971. Belson was the first judge to see the Watergate burglars, signing a search warrant and setting bail.

After thirteen years on the Superior Court bench, Belson was elevated to the District of Columbia Court of Appeals in 1981. The Washington Post described him as "a widely respected legal writer and jurist." He was a candidate for chief judge in 1984 and 1988, but the District of Columbia Judicial Nomination Commission instead chose William C. Pryor and Judith W. Rogers, respectively. Belson took senior status in 1991 and continued to hear cases until retiring from the court in 2017.
