= Angela Davis (disambiguation) =

Angela Davis (born 1944) is an American political activist.

Angela Davis may also refer to:

- Angela J. Davis, American law professor
- Angela Davis (musician) (born 1985), Australian saxophonist
- Angela Davis (chef) (born 1981), American chef and food blogger
- Angela Davis (reporter), American radio and television reporter

== See also ==
- Michaela Angela Davis (born 1964), American writer
