= Andrew Hood =

Andrew Hood may refer to:

- Andrew Hood (author), Canadian author
- Andrew Hood (businessman), British businessman
- Andrew M. Hood, American judge
