= Stanley S. Harris =

American judge (1927–2021)

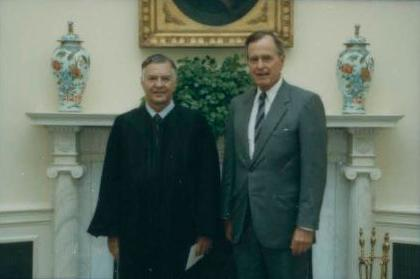
- Harris with President George H. W. Bush in 1990

Senior Judge of the United States District Court for the District of Columbia
- In office February 1, 1996 – June 2, 2001

Judge of the United States District Court for the District of Columbia
- In office November 14, 1983 – February 1, 1996
- Appointed by: Ronald Reagan
- Preceded by: John Lewis Smith Jr.
- Succeeded by: John D. Bates

United States Attorney for the District of Columbia
- In office 1982–1983
- Appointed by: Ronald Reagan
- Preceded by: Charles Ruff
- Succeeded by: Joseph diGenova

Associate Judge of the District of Columbia Court of Appeals
- In office 1972–1982
- Appointed by: Richard Nixon
- Preceded by: Seat established
- Succeeded by: John A. Terry

Judge of the Superior Court of the District of Columbia
- In office 1970–1972
- Appointed by: Richard Nixon

Personal details
- Born: October 19, 1927 Washington, D.C., U.S.
- Died: August 13, 2021 (aged 93)
- Education: University of Virginia (BS, LLB)

Stanley Sutherland Harris (October 19, 1927 – August 13, 2021) was a United States district judge of the United States District Court for the District of Columbia.

== Early life and education ==
Born in Washington, D.C., Harris was the son of Baseball Hall of Fame manager Bucky Harris of the Washington Senators. He was in the United States Army in the aftermath of World War II, from 1945 to 1947. He received a Bachelor of Science degree from the University of Virginia in 1951 and a Bachelor of Laws from the University of Virginia School of Law in 1953, where he was an editor of the Virginia Law Review.

== Career ==
He was in private practice in Washington, D.C. from 1953 to 1970, when he became a judge on the Superior Court of the District of Columbia from 1970 to 1972. He then served on the District of Columbia Court of Appeals from 1972 to 1982. In 1980, Harris was one of several more conservative judges, led by Frank Q. Nebeker, who attempted unsuccessfully to prevent the reappointment as chief judge of Theodore R. Newman Jr. He left the court to become the United States Attorney for the District of Columbia from February 5, 1982, to 1983, where he helped prosecute John Hinckley Jr.

== Federal judicial service ==
On November 1, 1983, Harris was nominated by President Ronald Reagan to a seat on the United States District Court for the District of Columbia vacated by Judge John Lewis Smith Jr. Harris was confirmed by the United States Senate on November 11, 1983, and received his commission on November 14, 1983. He assumed senior status on February 1, 1996, and served in that capacity until June 2, 2001, when he retired.

Harris died on August 13, 2021, at his home.

== Sources ==
- Interview with Hon. Stanley Harris, Oral History Project, Historical Society of the District of Columbia Circuit

Legal offices
Preceded by Seat established	Judge of the District of Columbia Court of Appeals; 1972–1982	Succeeded by John A. Terry
Preceded by John Lewis Smith Jr.	Judge of the United States District Court for the District of Columbia; 1983–1996	Succeeded by John D. Bates
