= John W. Kern III =

American judge (died 2018)

Senior Judge of the District of Columbia Court of Appeals
- In office 1987 – December 31, 2011

Associate Judge of the District of Columbia Court of Appeals
- In office 1968–1984
- Nominated by: Lyndon B. Johnson
- Succeeded by: John M. Steadman

Personal details
- Born: 1928 or 1929
- Died: January 30, 2018 (aged 89)
- Spouse: Margaret Ann Cantlin
- Children: John, Stephen
- Education: Princeton University (B.A.); Harvard University (J.D.)

John W. Kern III (born 1928 or 1929 – January 30, 2018) was a judge of the District of Columbia Court of Appeals.

Kern graduated from Princeton University in 1949 and Harvard Law School in 1952. After law school, Kern served in the Central Intelligence Agency for two years, then he moved to Washington, D.C. to clerk for Judge Harold Montelle Stephens of the United States Court of Appeals for the District of Columbia Circuit. He worked as an assistant to Attorney General Ramsey Clark and as an Assistant United States Attorney for the District of Columbia before being nominated to the Court of Appeals in 1968.

In 1980, Kern was one of several more conservative judges, led by Frank Q. Nebeker, who attempted unsuccessfully to prevent the reappointment as chief judge of Theodore R. Newman Jr. After sixteen years on the bench, Kern assumed senior status and became dean of the National Judicial College in Reno, Nevada, on October 3, 1984. He returned to the court in 1987 and continued to hear cases until his retirement on December 31, 2011.

In 1998, Kern was appointed by Judge Norma Holloway Johnson as a special master to investigate whether independent counsel Ken Starr had illegally leaked secret grand jury information concerning the Monica Lewinsky scandal to media outlets. In 1999, Kern submitted a report clearing Starr of the allegations.

Kern's grandfather, John W. Kern, was a Senator from Indiana and the first Senate Majority Leader. His father, John W. Kern Jr., was the 31st mayor of Indianapolis and later chief judge of the United States Tax Court. Kern's son, John W. Kern IV, is also a lawyer.
