= Warren King =

Warren King may refer to:

- Warren King (cartoonist) (1916–1978), political cartoonist
- Warren King (snooker player) (born 1955), Australian snooker player
- Warren R. King (born 1937), judge in the District of Columbia
