= Extermination (crime) =

Act of killing on a large scale

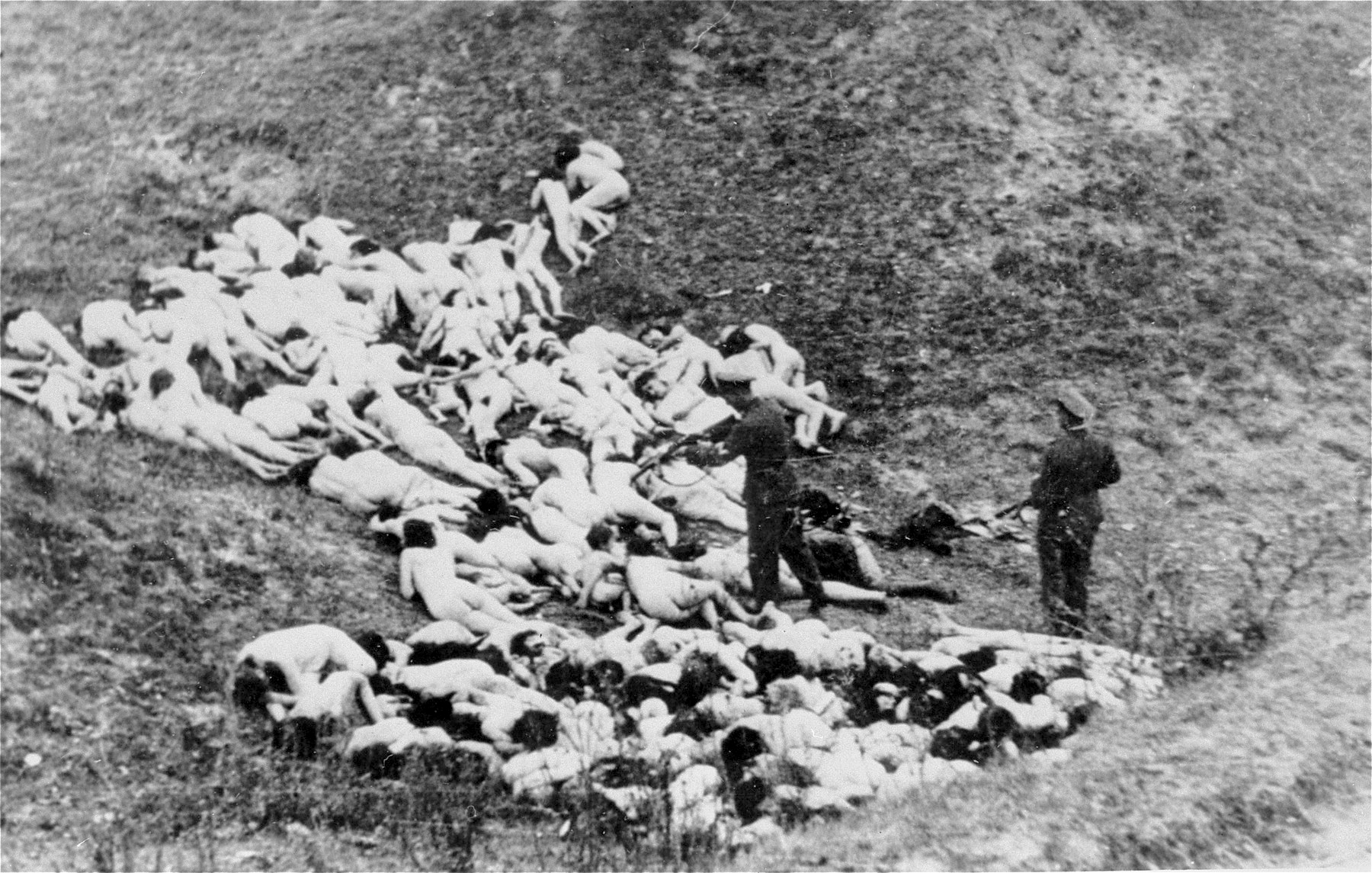
The Nuremberg trial verdict convicts many defendants of crimes against humanity for the extermination of Europe's Jewish population. Pictured: mass shooting outside the Mizocz ghetto, 14 October 1942.

Extermination is a crime against humanity that consists of "the act of killing on a large scale." To be convicted of this crime, someone must play a role in a sufficiently large-scale killing of civilians, including those carried out by "the intentional infliction of conditions of life... calculated to bring about the destruction of part of a population." It was first prosecuted at the International Military Tribunal in Nuremberg and was included in the enumerated crimes against humanity in the Rome Statute.

== History ==
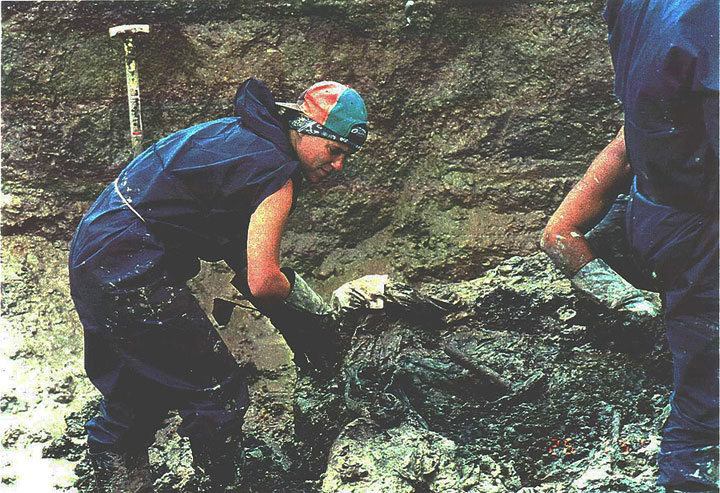
Exhumation of victims of murders at Brčko, Bosnia and Herzegovina, found to form the crime of extermination by the ICTY in the Stojan Župljanin judgement

Extermination was listed as a crime against humanity in the Nuremberg charter (as well as the charter for the Tokyo trial) and was first tried at the International Military Tribunal in 1945. Czech jurist Egon Schwelb argued that the purpose of its inclusion, alongside murder, was to enable the prosecution of perpetrators too remote from the act of killing to be charged as murder. Following these prosecutions, it was generally accepted to have become part of customary international law. It was codified into the Rome Statute in 1998.

The UN-backed International Criminal Tribunal for the former Yugoslavia (ICTY) convicted several people for extermination related to the Bosnian War, including Milan Lukić for the Višegrad massacres, Vujadin Popović, Ljubiša Beara and Radovan Karadžić for the Srebrenica massacre, as well as Stojan Župljanin.

Specifically, in the Župljanin judgement, the ICTY found that the criteria for the crime of extermination were met in the cases of Ključ on 10 July 1992 (killing of at least 144 people in Biljani); Prijedor ethnic cleansing between 24 May and August 1992 (killing of 800 people in Kozarac); Brčko in May 1992 (killing of 250 people); Zvornik massacre on 30 May 1992 (killing of 85 people); Banja Luka on 7 July 1992 (killing of 20 people); Vlasenica on 2 June 1992 (killing of 20 people in Drum); and Kotor Varoš on 25 June 1992 (killing of 26 people).

The Independent International Commission of Inquiry on the Occupied Palestinian Territories issued a report in 2024 stating that the Israeli destruction of the Gaza Strip healthcare system constituted the crime of extermination.

== Elements ==
Like other crimes against humanity, extermination must be "committed as part of a widespread or systematic attack directed against any civilian population" but can occur in peacetime as well as wartime (unlike war crimes). Similar to other international crimes, extermination includes both an actus reus (an act of large-scale killing) and mens rea (the intent to participate in this action). The definition of the crime according to the Rome Statute is mostly aligned with that of customary international law. According to William Schabas and other jurists, the only difference from customary international law was to specify that the crime of extermination includes "the intentional infliction of conditions of life, inter alia, the deprivation of access to food and medicine, calculated to bring about the destruction of part of a population"—phrasing that Schabas argues was inspired by one of the elements of the crime of genocide, "deliberately inflicting on the group conditions of life calculated to bring about its physical destruction in whole or in part."

=== Actus reus ===
The perpetrator's action must have composed part of a large-scale killing, whether one that took place at one time or one location, or a series of incidents that accumulate to sufficient massiveness. A plan or policy is not necessary. Separate incidents must be sufficiently connected to each other to be understood as one operation. There is no minimum size threshold for the crime; it is assessed based on the circumstances, although case law has recognized incidents ranging from dozens to thousands of victims. The collective nature of the crime is satisfied by being of sufficient scale. The victims may be targeted as individuals, and it is not required that the crime target a particular group of civilians or aim at the extermination of part of this group. (Similar acts not connected to large-scale killing are likely to count as the crime against humanity of murder instead). Playing a role in the part of killing at least one person as part of a mass killing event is sufficient, although the prosecution does not need to prove that the accused caused the death of any particular person. The accused's role might be commission, omission, or a combination of both; encouragement; assistance; or indirect planning. The method of killing is not relevant; it could be carried out indirectly, for example, depriving civilians of food or medicine, "creating a humanitarian crisis," blocking aid delivery, forcing people on a death march, or refusing shelter.

=== Mens rea ===
The accused must have intended to engage in large-scale killings, or to subject a large number of people to conditions that would be likely to cause their deaths. It is not required that the accused personally intended to kill on a large scale if it can be proven that their action was committed with the knowledge that it formed part of a sufficiently large-scale killing event. This might be proved by various means, such as large-scale logistics needed for certain types of killing. The motives for committing the crime are irrelevant; unlike persecution, discriminatory intent is not required.

== Comparison with other international crimes ==
Extermination (as well as the crime against humanity of murder) is similar to genocide and could cover the same events. Unlike genocide, extermination as a crime against humanity is not required to be committed with intent to destroy an ethnic, religious, or national group. Extermination is a crime committed against individuals, although on a large scale.

The same underlying events might support a prosecution for extermination as well as the war crime of starvation.

== Sources ==
- Mettraux, Guénaël (2020). International Crimes: Law and Practice: Volume II: Crimes Against Humanity. Oxford University Press. ISBN 978-0-19-260391-3.
