= Court of Appeals for the District of Columbia =

Court of Appeals for the District of Columbia may refer to:

- United States Court of Appeals for the District of Columbia Circuit, a United States Circuit Court established in 1893
- District of Columbia Court of Appeals, the highest court of the District of Columbia, equivalent to a state supreme court, established in 1970
