= United States v. Watson (1985) =

- Court: District of Columbia Court of Appeals
- Decided: 1985

United States v. Watson, 501 A.2d 791 (D.C. 1985), was a District of Columbia Court of Appeals case that discussed requirements for premeditation for first degree murder. The court held that for a jury to find the element of premeditation, "the time need not be long ... the time period may be as brief as a few seconds ... reflection and consideration, and not the lapse of time, are determinative of deliberation", so short durations do not automatically mean the killing was impulsive, done in the heat of passion, or done during frenzied activity.
