= Court of Appeals of the District of Columbia =

Court of Appeals of the District of Columbia may refer to:

- The Court of Appeals of the District of Columbia, a former name of the current United States Court of Appeals for the District of Columbia Circuit
- District of Columbia Court of Appeals, the current appellate court of the District of Columbia
