= Thompson's Corner, Maryland =

Unincorporated community in Maryland, U.S.

Coordinates: 38°58′39″N 77°11′40″W

Thompson's Corner is a small unincorporated community located in northern Montgomery County, Maryland, United States. It is located west of Clarksburg and east of Comus.

The community was once marked by a house and general store on Slidell Road owned by Richard Thompson (1796-1874), a local farmer. Circa 1860, his son Jerome (1833-1905) officially founded Thompson's Corner.

Through his son, Samuel, Richard Thompson is the third great-grandfather of country singer, Martina McBride.
