= Robert Rigsby =

American judge (born 1960)

Associate Judge of the Superior Court of the District of Columbia
- Incumbent
- Assumed office October 11, 2002
- Appointed by: George W. Bush
- Preceded by: Reggie Walton

Corporation Counsel of the District of Columbia
- In office 1999–2002
- Mayor: Anthony A. Williams
- Preceded by: Jo Anne Robinson (acting)
- Succeeded by: Arabella Teal (acting)

Personal details
- Born: Robert Ray Rigsby; December 4, 1960 (age 65) San Francisco, California, U.S.
- Spouse: Anna Blackburne
- Children: 1
- Education: San Jose State University (BS); University of California, Hastings (JD)

Robert Ray Rigsby (born December 4, 1960) is an associate judge of the Superior Court of the District of Columbia and former corporation counsel of the District of Columbia.

== Early life and career ==
Rigsby was born in San Francisco and raised in Vallejo, California. His father was a cook in the United States Army, and his mother was a nurse. While in college at San Jose State University, Rigsby was commissioned a second lieutenant in the United States Army Reserve. He became a JAG after graduating from University of California, Hastings College of the Law, and remained in the Army until 2014. He worked briefly as an assistant United States attorney in the Eastern District of Virginia in 1992, after which he joined the office of the Corporation Counsel for the District of Columbia as head of the criminal division. He worked his way up through the office, becoming Corporation Counsel (an office later renamed Attorney General for the District of Columbia) in February 2000.

Rigsby was nominated to the superior court by President George W. Bush on March 2, 2002, and confirmed by the United States Senate on July 25, 2002. He was sworn in on October 11, 2002.

== Personal life ==
He is married to Anna Blackburne-Rigsby, chief judge of the District of Columbia Court of Appeals, who served alongside him on the Superior Court until 2006.

Legal offices
Preceded by Jo Anne Robinson; Acting	Corporation Counsel of the District of Columbia; 1999–2002	Succeeded by Arabella Teal; Acting
Preceded by Reggie Walton	Judge of the District of Columbia Court of Appeals; 2002-present	Incumbent
