= Judge Washington =

Judge Washington may refer to:

- Bushrod Washington (1762–1829), associate justice of the Supreme Court of the United States
- Eric T. Washington (born 1953), associate judge of the District of Columbia Court of Appeals
- George Thomas Washington (1908–1971), judge of the United States Court of Appeals for the District of Columbia Circuit
