= Nathan Cayton =

District of Columbia attorney and judge

Nathan Cayton (January 15, 1899 - February 12, 1977) was an American attorney and jurist who served on District of Columbia Municipal Court from 1927 to 1942 and on the District of Columbia Court of Appeals from 1942 to 1956, including as chief judge from 1946 to 1956.

== Early life and education ==
Nathan Cayton was born in 1899 in Washington, D.C. Cayton attended Central High School, graduating in 1916, and received a scholarship to the National University School of Law, graduating in 1918, receiving both LL.B. and LL.M. degrees. He was admitted to the District of Columbia Bar in 1920.

== Career ==
After graduating, Cayton worked for the Department of War for around a year, before entering private practice in 1919.

On January 29, 1927, Cayton was appointed by president Calvin Coolidge to become a judge on the District of Columbia Municipal Court, succeeding judge Charles V. Meehan. At the time, he was the youngest person ever appointed to become a judge by the President. He was sworn in on February 16, 1927, by judge George C. Aukam. While on the Municipal Court, Cayton helped institute the District of Columbia small claims court.

In 1930, Cayton controversially claimed that there was a "Jewish crime wave" in a statement condemned by the American Jewish Committee.

In 1942, Cayton was appointed by president Franklin D. Roosevelt to become a member of the newly-formed District of Columbia Court of Appeals, and was appointed to the position of chief judge by president Harry S. Truman four years later.

== Later life and death ==
Cayton retired from the bench in 1956, and was succeeded as chief justice by Leo A. Rover. He remained civically active, including as a member of the National Academy of Arbitrators and a member of the executive committee of the American Arbitration Association, and filling in for judge vacancies.

Cayton never married, and never had any children. He died on February 12, 1977, five years after he suffered a heart attack.
