= Inez Smith Reid =

American judge (born 1937)

Senior Judge of the District of Columbia Court of Appeals
- In office April 2, 2011 – December 12, 2017

Associate Judge of the District of Columbia Court of Appeals
- In office 1995–2011
- Appointed by: Bill Clinton
- Preceded by: Emmet G. Sullivan
- Succeeded by: Corinne A. Beckwith

Corporation Counsel of the District of Columbia
- In office September 15, 1983 – July 8, 1986
- Mayor: Marion Barry
- Preceded by: Judith W. Rogers
- Succeeded by: John Suda (acting)

Inspector General of the Environmental Protection Agency
- In office December 9, 1979 – January 25, 1981
- President: Jimmy Carter
- Preceded by: Malcolm Stringer (acting)
- Succeeded by: Ernest Bradley (acting)

Personal details
- Born: Elsie Inez Virginia Smith; April 7, 1937 (age 89) New Orleans, Louisiana, U.S.
- Relatives: George Bundy Smith (brother)
- Education: Howard University; Tufts University (BA); Yale University (LLB); University of California, Los Angeles (MA); Columbia University (PhD); University of Virginia (LLM)

Elsie Inez Virginia Smith Reid (born April 7, 1937) is a former judge of the District of Columbia Court of Appeals and former Corporation Counsel of the District of Columbia.

Reid was born in New Orleans and raised in Washington, D.C., where she graduated from Dunbar High School. She began college at Howard University before graduating from Tufts University. After college, she joined her twin brother, George Bundy Smith, also a future judge, at Yale Law School, where they were the only two black students in their class. At Yale, Reid roomed with future delegate from D.C. Eleanor Holmes Norton and befriended Marian Wright Edelman.

After law school, Reid taught law in the newly independent Democratic Republic of the Congo and earned a Ph.D. at Columbia University. Unable to find work at law firms due to her race and gender, she took a series of teaching positions at Lehman College, Hunter College, Brooklyn College, and Barnard College. During the Carter administration, Reid moved to D.C. to work as Deputy General Counsel for Regulation Review at the United States Department of Health, Education and Welfare and later as the first Inspector General of the Environmental Protection Agency. From 1983 to 1986, she served as Corporation Counsel for the District of Columbia, leaving to join the firm Finley, Kumble, Wagner, Underberg, Manley, Myerson & Casey.

In 1995, Reid was nominated by President Bill Clinton to become an associate judge on the D.C. Court of Appeals. At the time she retired from active status in 2011, she was the court's most prolific judge. After serving as a senior judge for six years, Reid retired on December 12, 2017.

== Family and education ==
Inez Smith and her twin brother George Bundy Smith were born in New Orleans, Louisiana, on April 7, 1937, to Reverend Sidney R. Smith, Sr. and Beatrice Bundy, who was a teacher. They also had an older brother, Sidney R. Smith, Jr.. Reid's mother moved her children to Washington, D.C., in 1938 or 1939, when it was still segregated. The family was reunited with extended relatives, and they lived with their grandmother and great uncle in the Black community of Northeast DC. Reid recalled her upbringing in DC as defined by her nurturing community and revolving around church, school and family, with family at the center of everything. Though many of the Black communities in DC at the time were producing highly educated Black professionals, many could not find work because of the prevalence of racism. Many professionals that had received PhDs and Masters from prestigious universities would return to teach in segregated Black high schools such as Dunbar High School, Reid's alma mater. At Dunbar, Reid was surrounded with highly educated Black faculty and motivated students. She recalled that this created an electric culture where students were constantly reminded of those who achieved greatness before them despite the odds. Reid studied French beginning in elementary school and eventually became fluent, and took on Latin in high school as well.

When she graduated from high school, Reid studied at Howard University and then Tufts University, where she was exposed for the first time to students from different racial, ethnic and geographical backgrounds. When she started at Tufts as a sophomore, her intention was not to become a lawyer but rather gain a well-rounded education. Reid and her twin, who was studying at Yale, were majorly influenced by the 1954 major historic moment in American history for educational equity, Brown v Board of Education. Reid and her brother traveled to the Supreme Court in September 1958 to watch a decision related to Brown v Board, in which a case in Arkansas had been climbing the courts to prevent integration of schools in Little Rock. The case of Aaron v Cooper went to the supreme court, and Reid and her brother were able to witness Thurgood Marshall’s argument and the historic decision that continued the implementation of Brown v Board in all states. Reid graduated magna cum laude from Tufts in 1962.

Reid's brother George had been studying at Yale University, and in their senior years the twins applied to attend Yale Law School together. Although Judge Reid received a scholarship to New York University Law School, George encouraged his sister to join him at Yale and "make a way out of no way" despite the financial burden. Judge Reid and her brother would go on to become the only two Black students in their class at Yale Law School, and were often mistaken for janitors and or the school's clerical staff by their white classmates. Despite these negative experiences, Reid remembered her time at Yale positively, with great professors and courses and the opportunity to forge new relationships, such as with future Dartmouth College president James O. Freedman and with her roommate at Yale Marian Wright Edelman who founded the Children's Defense Fund. While at Yale, Judge Reid and her brother George would found funding through their Yale professors to travel to Africa with Operations Crossroads Africa, which was a non-profit organization that helped young people spend a summer in Africa helping to construct schools and other necessary places in newly independent countries. Judge Reid recalls the summer in Guinea as incredibly impactful, especially because of the connections of struggle she saw between newly freed Africans and African Americans living under Jim Crow in the Southern United States. Inspired by what she saw in Africa and in the American south as Freedom Riders, including her brother, were fighting for their rights, Judge Reid joined her twin brother at the NAACP Legal Defense Fund for three consecutive summers. After Reid graduated Yale Law School, she would go on to earn her master's degree from UCLA in political science, a PhD in government and public law from Columbia University in 1968, and an LLM from the University of Virginia School of Law in 2004.

== Career ==
=== Teaching in Congo ===
After graduating from Yale Law School without a job, Reid received a Ford Foundation Foreign Area Training Fellowship and enrolled in a master's degree program at UCLA, where she studied political science with a concentration in African studies. The following year, she accepted a position as a professor in Congo-Leopoldville at the Ecole Nationale de Droit et d'Administration. The opportunity was jointly funded by Yale Law School, the Ford Foundation and the Congolese government, and her role was to teach students studying to become magistrate judges. Reid taught her law students in French amidst the ongoing Congo Crisis. She worked alongside European professors and administrators who at times belittled her American education. In Africa, just like in the other places she lived and worked, Reid experienced racism and had to prove herself to those around her.

=== Teaching in the United States ===
Her teaching experience, coupled with the limited job market for Black law school graduates, propelled Judge Reid into education after she finished her time in Congo. She started her twelve-year teaching career in 1964 at the State University of New York at New Paltz, where she taught African studies and political science, while enrolled in graduate school at Columbia University. In 1965, Reid was a lecturer in political science at Hunter College. She would go on to teach at Lehman College, Brooklyn College, Barnard College, the University of Virginia School of Law, the West Virginia University College of Law, American University, and the City University of New York at New Paltz. At Brooklyn College, she was an associate professor, and at American University she was a constitutional scholar and an adjunct professor in the Department of Government. In addition to law, Reid taught political science and African studies, and she published in the fields of constitutional law, African-American studies, African studies, and environmental law.

=== New York and federal government ===
Reid supplemented her work as a professor with involvement in non-government organizations that served Black women and community development. While she was teaching at Barnard College in the 1970s, her brother encouraged her to pursue opportunities that used her law degree. Reid took a leave of absence at Barnard to serve as the General Counsel for the New York State Division of Youth under Governor Hugh Carey's administration in 1976.

In 1977 she was called upon by President Carter's administration to serve as the Deputy General Counsel for Regulation Review of what was the Department of Health, Education and Welfare. Reid for the Carter Administration again as the Inspector General of the Environmental Protection Agency in 1979. At the EPA, Reid was responsible for conducting audits, investigations and reviews on the EPA's programs, legislation and proposed regulations. During her time there, her main goals were promoting efficiency and economy in government programs and implementing programs to prevent and detect abuse, fraud, waste and mismanagement within EPA programs.

=== D.C. Corporation Counsel ===
When President Reagan was elected, Reid and her fellow Inspector Generals that served under the Carter Administration were all fired. In March 1981, Reid moved on to serve as chief of the Legislation and Opinion section in the office of what was then called the Corporation Counsel for the District of Columbia, which is now the Attorney General of the District of Columbia. This office had a staff of 100 lawyers which represented the city in civil litigation as well as a wide variety of misdemeanor prosecutions, more serious traffic charges, and juvenile cases. Reid was nominated as the new Corporation Counsel by Mayor Marion Barry on September 15, 1983, replacing her former boss Judith W. Rogers. Though Reid was considered a little known figure in Washington, her nomination was praised by Councilmember Wilhelmina J. Rolark (D-Ward 8), who was the head of the Council's Judiciary Committee at the time.

As the Corporation Counsel, Judge Reid oversaw all the official legal affairs of the District, supervised about 200 employees and had an operating budget of $6.2 million. Her annual salary was $63,700.

Reid faced controversy in November 1983 when she promoted Laphalia Joyce Gause to a position as her executive assistant that would pay $43,000 per year after Reid cosigned a note for Gause to buy a $191,000 house. Reid argued that there was no impropriety surrounding the promotion because Gause had been recommended for the position by her former supervisor and Reid consulted an ethics counselor before she moved on the promotion. Mayor Barry's legal counsel investigated the incident and found no "abuse of discretion" by Reid, but noted a "real or apparent" conflict of interest.

=== Private law practice ===
In 1985, Judge Reid took a year-long leave from the Corporation Counsel's office to teach at the University of West Virginia College of Law. In 1986, after she completed the one-year leave, she left the Corporation Counsel's office to take a job with the law firm of Finley, Kumble, Wagner, Heine, Underberg, Manley & Casey. There, Reid used her previous experience as Inspector General of the EPA to specialize in environmental litigation, appellate cases and white collar crime. Reid also worked at the law firms of Laxalt, Washington, Perito & Dubuc, Graham & James, and Lewis, White & Clay.

=== D.C Court of Appeals ===
In 1995, Reid was nominated to the D.C. Court of Appeals by President Bill Clinton. Reid replaced Emmet G. Sullivan, who was appointed to the U.S. District Court bench. Judge Reid was sworn in by her twin brother, George Bundy Smith who was serving as an associate judge of the New York Appeals court.

The National Law Journal reported in 2010 that Reid was the court's most prolific judge, issuing 85 written opinions over the course of four years. She was in the middle of the nine active judges on the court in terms of timing, as she averaged about 246 days per written opinion.

Reid was one of the five affirming judges in a 2010 case surrounding same-sex marriage. In the 81-page opinion, Reid and four other judges concluded that the D.C. Board of Elections and Ethics acted within the law when it rejected an initiative presented by an anti-gay marriage group to institute a referendum on same-sex marriage in the District.

Reid retired from active service on the appeals court on April 2, 2011. She served as a senior judge for six more years until her retirement on December 12, 2017.

== Honors and awards ==
2011 Stars of the Bar Award Recipient from the Women's Bar Association of the District of Columbia

Pro Bono Equal Rights Award from the Washington Committee of the NAACP Legal Defense and Education Fund Inc.

Ollie May Cooper Award from the Washington Bar Association

Emily Gregory Award, Barnard Teaching College Awards, 1976

2012 Charles Hamilton Houston Medallion of Merit from the Washington Bar Association

Hero in Law 2008 Award at the Annual Olender Foundation Awards

== See also ==
- List of female state attorneys general in the United States

== Sources ==
- Nominations of Inez Smith Reid, Linda Kay Davis, Ronna Lee Beck, and Eric Tyson Washington : hearing before the Committee on Governmental Affairs, United States Senate
- Environmental Protection Agency Nomination of Inez Smith Reid To Be Inspector General

Legal offices
Preceded by Judith W. Rogers	Corporation Counsel of the District of Columbia; 1983–1986	Succeeded by John Suda; Acting
Preceded by Emmet G. Sullivan	Associate Judge of the District of Columbia Court of Appeals; 1995–2011	Succeeded by Corinne A. Beckwith
