= Catherine B. Kelly =

American judge

Associate Judge of the District of Columbia Court of Appeals
- In office 1967 – March 31, 1983
- Nominated by: Lyndon B. Johnson
- Preceded by: Thomas D. Quinn
- Succeeded by: Judith W. Rogers

Personal details
- Born: December 12, 1917
- Died: August 25, 1995 (aged 77) Manchester, Massachusetts
- Education: Smith College (B.A.); George Washington University (J.D.)

Catherine B. Kelly (December 12, 1917 – August 25, 1995) was an Associate Judge of the District of Columbia Court of Appeals, the highest court for the District of Columbia.

Kelly was raised in D.C. and graduated from Western High School in 1934 and Smith College in 1939. She served in the Women's Army Corps during World War II and then graduated from George Washington University Law School in 1951. From 1953 to 1957, she worked in the civil division of the office of the United States Attorney for the District of Columbia. She became a judge on the D.C. Municipal Court (predecessor to the Superior Court of the District of Columbia) in 1957 and was elevated to the appeals court in 1967. On the appeals court, she gained a reputation as a liberal ally of Chief Judge Theodore R. Newman Jr. Her law clerks included future judges Diane Gilbert Sypolt and Colleen Kollar-Kotelly. In 1983, she retired from the court and returned to private practice, becoming a partner at a firm her father and uncle founded in the 1920s. She served as D.C. ethics ombudsman under Mayors Marion Barry and Sharon Pratt Kelly.

== See also ==
- List of female state supreme court justices
