= Joshua Deahl =

American judge (born 1981)

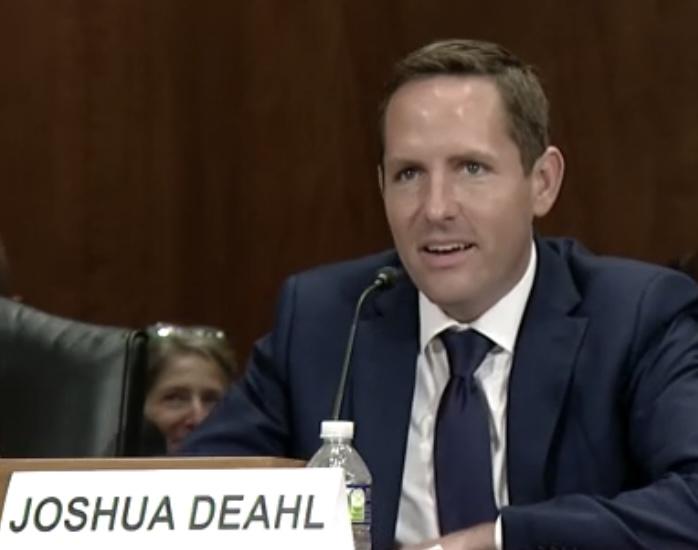

Associate Judge of the District of Columbia Court of Appeals
- Incumbent
- Assumed office January 6, 2020
- President: Donald Trump
- Preceded by: Eric T. Washington

Personal details
- Born: Joshua Adam Deahl; February 13, 1981 (age 45) Tucson, Arizona, U.S.
- Spouse: Jessica Deahl
- Children: 3
- Education: Arizona State University, Tempe (BA); University of Michigan (JD)

Joshua Adam Deahl (born February 13, 1981) is an American attorney who has served as an associate judge on the District of Columbia Court of Appeals since January 2020.

== Education and career ==
Deahl earned his Bachelor of Arts from Arizona State University in 2003 and his Juris Doctor from University of Michigan Law School in 2006.

After graduating from law school, Deahl clerked for Court of Appeals for the Fifth Circuit Judge Fortunato Benavides and Supreme Court Justices Sandra Day O’Connor and Anthony Kennedy. Deahl worked as an attorney for the Public Defender Service for the District of Columbia and in private practice.

=== District of Columbia Court of Appeals ===
On June 29, 2017, President Donald Trump nominated Deahl to the District of Columbia Court of Appeals. His nomination expired on January 4, 2019, with the end of the 115th United States Congress.

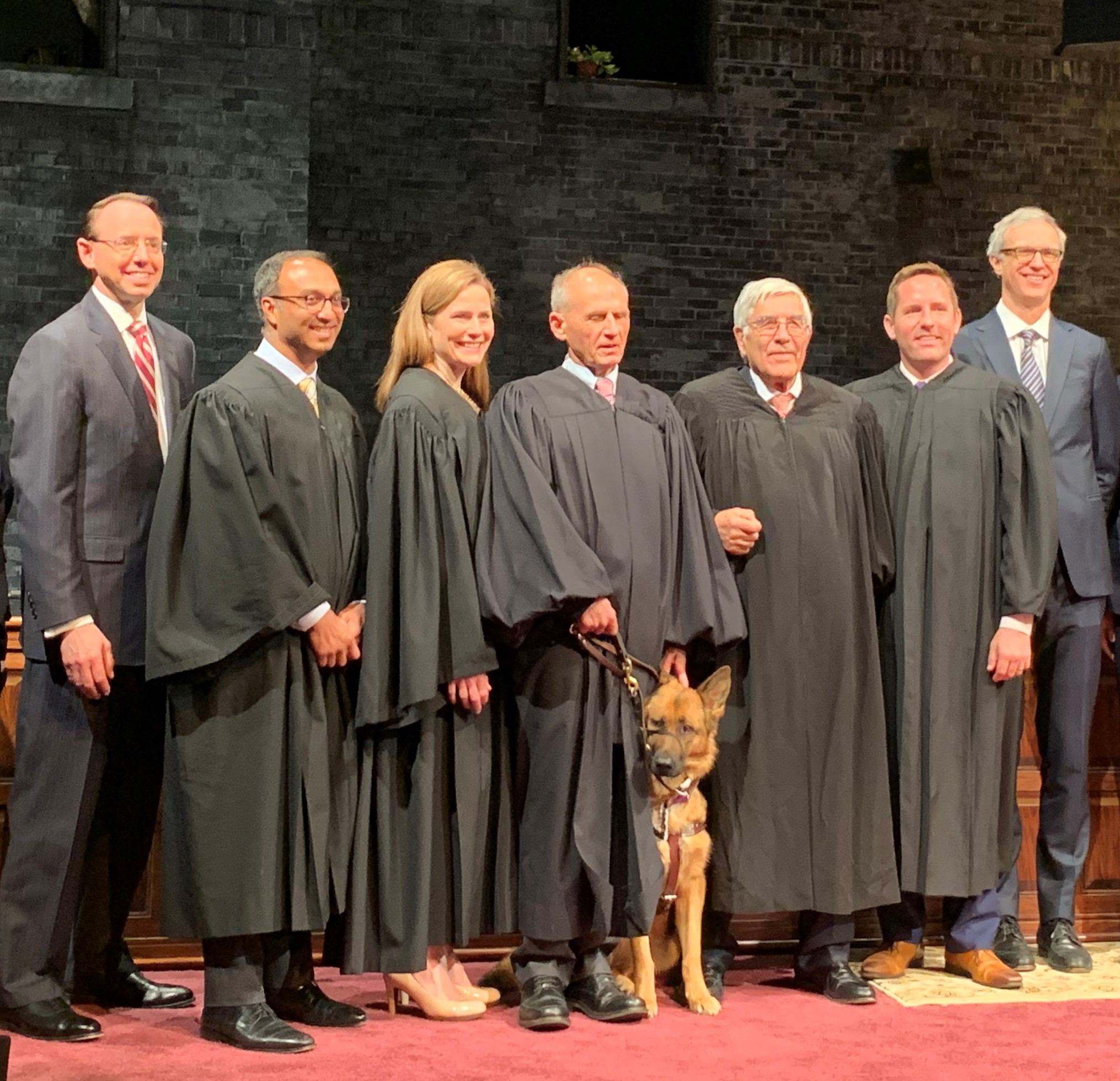
From left to right: Rod Rosenstein, Judge Mehta, Justice Barrett, Judge Tatel, Lord Nicholas Phillips, Judge Deahl, and Jeff Fisher

Trump renominated Deahl on May 2, 2019, to a 15-year term as an associate judge on the District of Columbia Court of Appeals to the seat vacated by Eric T. Washington. On October 22, 2019, the Senate Committee on Homeland Security and Governmental Affairs held a hearing on his nomination. On November 6, 2019, the Committee reported his nomination favorably to the senate floor. On November 21, 2019, the full Senate confirmed his nomination by voice vote. He was sworn in on January 6, 2020.

=== AI in the Law ===
Judge Deahl was one of the first judges to openly use AI in a judicial opinion when, in a dissent, he shared some exchanges he had with an LLM when scrutinizing his view that one could say beyond a reasonable doubt that there was a "plain and strong likelihood" that a dog left in a car in 98 degree heat for 1 hour and 20 minutes would be harmed.

In the fall of 2025, Judge Deahl co-taught the first law school course focused on AI use in the judiciary. He is teaching a similar course, AI in Appellate Practice and Judicial Decision-making, at UChicago Law in the fall semester of 2026.

== See also ==
- List of law clerks for the first seat of the Supreme Court of the United States
- List of law clerks for the eighth seat of the Supreme Court of the United States

Legal offices
Preceded by Eric T. Washington	Judge of the District of Columbia Court of Appeals; 2020–present	Incumbent
