= John M. Steadman =

American judge

John Steadman

Senior Judge of the District of Columbia Court of Appeals
- Incumbent
- Assumed office 2004

Associate Judge of the District of Columbia Court of Appeals
- In office 1985–2004
- Appointed by: Ronald Reagan
- Preceded by: John W. Kern III
- Succeeded by: Noël A. Kramer

Personal details
- Born: John Montague Steadman; August 8, 1930 (age 95) Honolulu, Hawaii, U.S.
- Spouse: Alison Lunt
- Education: Yale University (BA); Harvard University (JD)

John Montague Steadman (born August 8, 1930) is a senior associate judge of the District of Columbia Court of Appeals. He was appointed to the court in 1985 and took senior status in 2004.

Steadman was born and raised in Honolulu, where he graduated from Punahou School. He graduated from Yale College in 1952, where he was a member of Skull and Bones. He graduated from Harvard Law School in 1955 and became an associate at Pillsbury, Madison & Sutro in San Francisco. In 1963, Steadman moved to Washington, D.C. to work at the Office of Legal Counsel in the United States Department of Justice. His career in government service culminated in two years as General Counsel of the Air Force, after which he entered academia. Steadman taught at the University of Pennsylvania Law School from 1970 to 1972 and at Georgetown University Law Center from 1972 to 1985.

In 1985, Steadman was nominated to the D.C. Court of Appeals by President Reagan and confirmed by the Senate. He was Reagan's second choice to fill the seat; Reagan's first nominee, Deputy U.S. Solicitor General Andrew L. Frey, was withdrawn due to opposition from conservatives who expressed concern about Frey's stances on gun control and abortion.

== Sources ==
Legal offices
Preceded by William Doolittle	General Counsel of the Air Force; 1968–1970	Succeeded by Jack Stempler
Preceded by John W. Kern III	Judge of the District of Columbia Court of Appeals; 1985–2004	Succeeded by Noël A. Kramer
