= Annice M. Wagner =

American judge (born 1937)

Senior Judge of the District of Columbia Court of Appeals
- In office 2005–2013

Chief Judge of the District of Columbia Court of Appeals
- In office 1994–2005
- Preceded by: Judith W. Rogers
- Succeeded by: Eric T. Washington

Judge of the District of Columbia Court of Appeals
- In office 1990–2005
- Nominated by: George H. W. Bush
- Preceded by: Julia Cooper Mack
- Succeeded by: John R. Fisher

Judge of the Superior Court of the District of Columbia
- In office 1977–1990
- Nominated by: Jimmy Carter
- Preceded by: Harry T. Alexander
- Succeeded by: Wendell P. Gardner

Personal details
- Born: September 9, 1937 (age 89) Washington, D.C.
- Spouse: Charles Wagner
- Children: Alison E. McBryde
- Education: Wayne State University (BA, LLB)

Annice M. Wagner (born September 9, 1937) is a former judge of the District of Columbia Court of Appeals. She served as Chief Judge from 1994 to 2005.

== Biography ==
Born and raised in Washington, D.C., Wagner attended the city's prestigious Dunbar High School, graduating in 1955. She earned her undergraduate and law degrees at Wayne State University in 1959 and 1962, respectively. After law school, Wagner spent a decade in private practice in Washington, including at Houston & Gardner, also home to her future colleagues Emmet G. Sullivan and Theodore R. Newman, Jr. From 1973 to 1975, Wagner served as general counsel of the National Capital Housing Authority, predecessor to the District of Columbia Housing Authority. In 1975, Wagner was appointed People's Counsel, an office of the District of Columbia government that represents and advocates for utility consumers.

== D.C. Judgeship ==
In June 1977, Wagner became a judge of the Superior Court of the District of Columbia, and in 1990 she was elevated to the Court of Appeals. She was designated chief judge on June 13, 1994, and redesignated to that position in 1998 and 2002. Under her leadership, relations within the court became more collegial and harmonious. In 2005, she took senior status, and in 2013 she retired from the bench.
