= Leo A. Rover =

American prosecutor and judge

Leo A. Rover (August 15, 1888 - November 11, 1960) was an American attorney, prosecutor, and jurist who served as United States Attorney for the District of Columbia from 1928 to 1934 and from 1953 to 1956, and as the chief judge of the District of Columbia Court of Appeals from 1956 until his death in 1960.

== Early life and education ==
Rover was born in Washington, D.C. on August 15, 1888. He attended Gonzaga College High School and St. John's College before studying law at the Georgetown University Law School, receiving a LL.B. He was admitted to the District of Columbia Bar on June 20, 1910.

== Career ==
Rover became an assistant to then-United States Attorney for the District of Columbia Peyton Gordon on September 16, 1924. On January 5, 1929, President Calvin Coolidge nominated Rover to become the United States Attorney for the District of Columbia, succeeding Gordon, who had become an associate justice of the United States District Court for the District of Columbia. During his tenure, he was involved in, among other cases, the Teapot Dome scandal and the conviction of Gaston Means. He served until 1933, when he entered private practice. While in private practice, he defended Oscar Collazo in his trial concerning the attempted assassination of President Truman.

On March 16, 1953, Rover was nominated by President Dwight D. Eisenhower to become the United States Attorney for the District of Columbia again, succeeding Charles M. Irelan, who had resigned. In his second term, Rover led a controversial fight to convict more homosexual people in soliciting and assault cases.

On January 19, 1956, President Eisenhower nominated Rover to become the chief judge of the District of Columbia Court of Appeals, succeeding retiring judge Nathan Cayton.

== Death ==
On November 11, 1960, Rover suffered a heart attack and died at the age of 72 in Washington, D.C. He was buried at Mount Olivet Cemetery.
