= Brad Garcia =

American judge (born 1986)

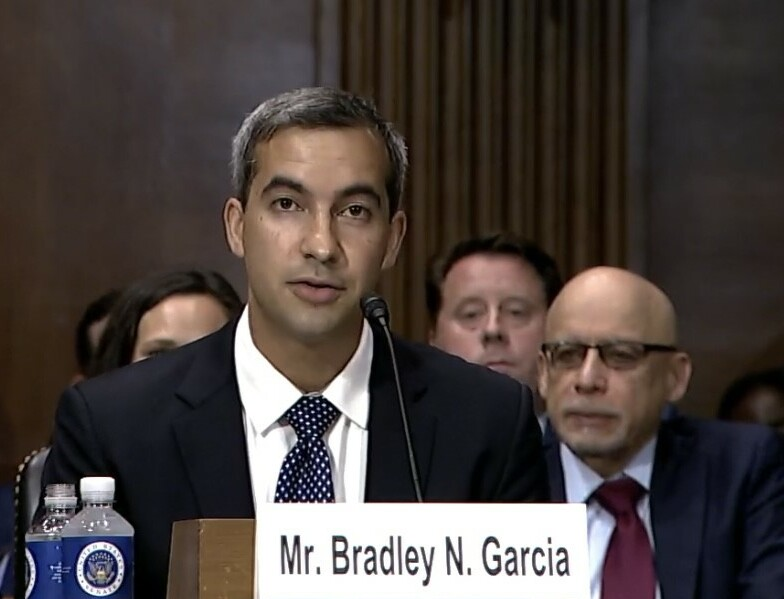

Judge of the United States Court of Appeals for the District of Columbia Circuit
- Incumbent
- Assumed office May 16, 2023
- Appointed by: Joe Biden
- Preceded by: Judith W. Rogers

Personal details
- Born: Bradley Nelson Garcia; 1986 (age 39–40) Gaithersburg, Maryland, U.S.
- Education: Johns Hopkins University (BA); Harvard University (JD)

Bradley Nelson Garcia (born 1986) is an American lawyer and jurist serving as a United States circuit judge of the United States Court of Appeals for the District of Columbia Circuit. He was an official at the United States Department of Justice from 2022 to 2023.

== Education ==
Garcia was born in 1986 in Gaithersburg, Maryland. He graduated from Johns Hopkins University in 2008 with a Bachelor of Arts in international studies and economics, where he also was president of the university's chapter of the Pi Kappa Alpha fraternity. Garcia then attended Harvard Law School, where he was an editor of the Harvard Law Review. He graduated in 2011 with a Juris Doctor, magna cum laude.

== Career ==
After law school, Garcia was a law clerk for Judge Thomas B. Griffith of the United States Court of Appeals for the District of Columbia Circuit from 2011 to 2012 and for Associate Justice Elena Kagan of the United States Supreme Court from 2012 to 2013.

After his clerkships, Garcia entered private practice at the law firm O'Melveny & Myers in 2013, becoming a partner in 2020. Garcia practiced appellate law with a client list that included Google, Warner Bros., and the Ford Motor Company. Garcia argued more than a dozen times before federal and state appeals courts, including before the United States Supreme Court in a 2021 immigration case, United States v. Palomar-Santiago. Other cases he practiced included the fields of criminal law, corporate law, insurance coverage, patent rights, and federal jurisdiction.

In February 2022, Garcia left private practice to serve as a deputy assistant attorney general in the United States Department of Justice's Office of Legal Counsel. He left in 2023 when he became a federal judge.

=== Notable cases ===
Garcia was part of the legal team representing El Paso County, Texas, in a suit challenging the diversion of United States Department of Defense funds to build a border wall.

In 2019, Garcia represented a man seeking better mental health treatment in a Pennsylvania prison. A unanimous panel of the United States Court of Appeals for the Third Circuit ruled in favor of the prisoner.

In 2019, Garcia was co-counsel for Jason Daniel Sims, who pleaded guilty to being a felon in possession of a firearm, in violation of 18 U.S.C. § 922(g)(1). Sims was sentenced as an armed career criminal, and he appealed. The Armed Career Criminal Act ("ACCA") imposes a mandatory fifteen-year minimum sentence on a defendant convicted of being a felon in possession of a firearm or ammunition who has three or more previous convictions for violent felonies or serious drug offenses. 18 U.S.C. § 924(e)(1). The district court designated Sims an armed career criminal based on four convictions: two Arkansas residential burglaries and two serious drug offenses. Sims appealed, arguing that his previous Arkansas burglary convictions do not qualify as violent felonies and that he therefore lacks the three or more convictions necessary to qualify as an armed career criminal.

In 2020, Garcia was the counsel of record in June Medical Services, LLC v. Russo, challenging Louisiana's law requiring doctors who perform abortions to have admitting privileges at a local hospital.

In 2022, Garcia was co-counsel for Bel Air Auto Auction, Inc. in their lawsuit against Great Northern Insurance Company. Bel Air's claims stemmed from Great Northern's denial of insurance benefits Bel Air asserts Great Northern owed it to cover business loss Bel Air incurred during the COVID-19 pandemic.

=== Federal judicial service ===
On June 15, 2022, President Joe Biden nominated Garcia to serve as a United States circuit judge for the United States Court of Appeals for the District of Columbia Circuit. President Biden nominated Garcia to the seat to be vacated by Judge Judith W. Rogers, who subsequently assumed senior status on September 1, 2022. On July 27, 2022, a hearing on his nomination was held before the Senate Judiciary Committee. During his confirmation hearing, Republican senators questioned him on cases that he was involved with that dealt with gun rights and abortion access. On September 15, 2022, his nomination was reported out of committee by a 12–10 vote. On January 3, 2023, his nomination was returned to the president under Rule XXXI, Paragraph 6 of the United States Senate; he was renominated later the same day. On February 2, 2023, his nomination was reported out of committee by an 11–9 vote. On May 9, 2023, Majority Leader Chuck Schumer filed cloture on his nomination. On May 11, 2023, the Senate invoked cloture on his nomination by a 54–41 vote. On May 15, 2023, his nomination was confirmed by a 53–40 vote. He received his judicial commission on May 16, 2023. Garcia is the first Latino to serve as a judge on the D.C. Circuit.

== See also ==
- List of Hispanic and Latino American jurists
- List of law clerks for the fourth seat of the Supreme Court of the United States

Legal offices
| Preceded by Judith W. Rogers | Judge of the United States Court of Appeals for the District of Columbia Circuit; 2023–present | Incumbent |
