= Egon Schwelb =

Czech jurist

Egon Schwelb (1899– March 20, 1979, Manhattan, New York) was a Czech jurist. He played an important role in drafting the Universal Declaration of Human Rights. He was legal director for the United Nations War Crimes Commission before becoming a senior human rights official at the United Nations in New York.

In 1922, he earned a doctorate in law from Prague University. He had a law practice in Prague. Some of his clients included those fleeing Nazi persecution.

He was married to Caroline Schwelb, a PhD in German studies from Prague University. They fled Czechoslovakia after the Nazi occupation of Czechoslovakia, working for the Czechoslovak government in exile in London, United Kingdom. Caroline's brother died in the Czechoslovak army whereas her sister died in a concentration camp. They moved to New York after he became a senior human rights official at the United Nations. After retiring from the UN, he lectured at Yale Law School from 1962 to 1968. He also took on assignments for the legal and human rights divisions of the UN and the Council of Europe.

Caroline and Egon had one child, Frank Schwelb, who became a judge of the Superior Court of the District of Columbia and the District of Columbia Court of Appeals. Caroline established the language department at Westchester Community College.

Egon died at New York University Hospital. He lived in Manhattan, New York at the time of his death.

== Works ==
- Schwelb, Egon (1964). Human Rights and the International Community: The Roots and Growth of the Universal Declaration of Human Rights, 1948-1963. Quadrangle Books.
