= Corinne A. Beckwith =

American judge (born 1963)

Corinne Beckwith
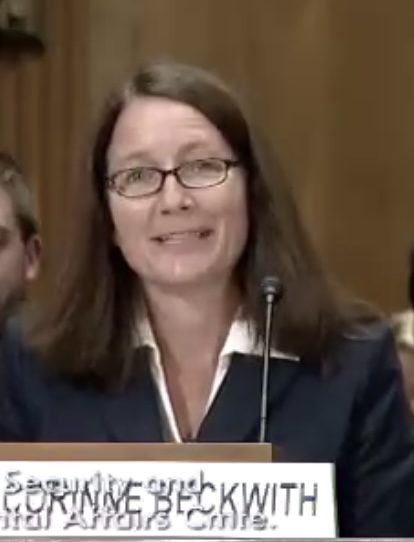

Associate Judge of the District of Columbia Court of Appeals
- Incumbent
- Assumed office December 2011
- Appointed by: Barack Obama
- Preceded by: Inez Smith Reid

Personal details
- Born: April 3, 1963 (age 63) Grand Rapids, Michigan, U.S.
- Spouse: Brent Futrell
- Education: Kalamazoo College (BA); University of Illinois (MA); University of Michigan (JD)

Corinne Ann Beckwith (born April 3, 1963) is an associate judge of the District of Columbia Court of Appeals, the highest appellate court for the District of Columbia. She spent her legal career as a public defender before being nominated to the bench by President Barack Obama in 2011.

== Biography ==
Beckwith grew up in Michigan, where she attended public schools in Grand Rapids and received a B.A. with honors in English from Kalamazoo College in 1985. She was the first person in her family to graduate from college.

After college, Beckwith went into journalism, earning an M.A. from the University of Illinois in 1987 and working as a reporter for the Midland Daily News. In 1989, she entered law school at the University of Michigan. She served as editor-in-chief of the Michigan Law Review and graduated with a J.D. in 1992. She then clerked for Judge Richard Dickson Cudahy of the United States Court of Appeals for the Seventh Circuit and Justice John Paul Stevens of the United States Supreme Court before beginning a career in appellate public defense in Michigan and then, beginning in 1999, at the Public Defender Service for the District of Columbia.

On March 31, 2011, President Barack Obama nominated Beckwith to serve as an associate judge on the D.C. Court of Appeals. On November 18, 2011, the United States Senate confirmed her nomination by voice vote.

== See also ==
- List of law clerks for the fourth seat of the Supreme Court of the United States

Legal offices
Preceded by Inez Smith Reid	Associate Judge of the District of Columbia Court of Appeals; 2011–present	Incumbent
