= Heidi Pasichow =

American judge (born 1955)

Heidi M. Pasichow

Associate Judge of the Superior Court of the District of Columbia
- In office August 25, 2008 – June 27, 2025
- President: George W. Bush
- Preceded by: Anna Blackburne-Rigsby
- Succeeded by: Christopher De Bono

Personal details
- Born: May 24, 1955 (age 71) Queens, New York, U.S.
- Education: George Washington University (BA); American University (JD)

Heidi M. Pasichow (born May 24, 1955) is an American lawyer who served as an associate judge of the Superior Court of the District of Columbia.

== Education and career ==
Pasichow earned her Bachelor of Arts from George Washington University in 1977, and her Juris Doctor from Washington College of Law in 1981.

After graduating, she clerked for Judge Sylvia Bacon of the D.C. Superior Court from 1983 to 1985.

=== D.C. Superior Court ===
On December 5, 2006, President George W. Bush nominated her to be an associate judge of the Superior Court of the District of Columbia. Her nomination expired on December 9, 2006, with the end of the 109th United States Congress.

President Bush renominated her on January 9, 2007, to a 15-year term as an associate judge on the Superior Court of the District of Columbia, filling the seat vacated by Anna Blackburne-Rigsby. The Senate Committee on Homeland Security and Governmental Affairs held a hearing on her nomination on July 23, 2008. The committee reported her nomination favorably to the Senate floor on July 30, 2008. The full Senate confirmed her nomination by voice vote on August 1, 2008. She was sworn in on August 25, 2008. She retired effective June 27, 2025.
