= Gerard D. Reilly =

American judge (1906–1995)

Gerard Denis Reilly
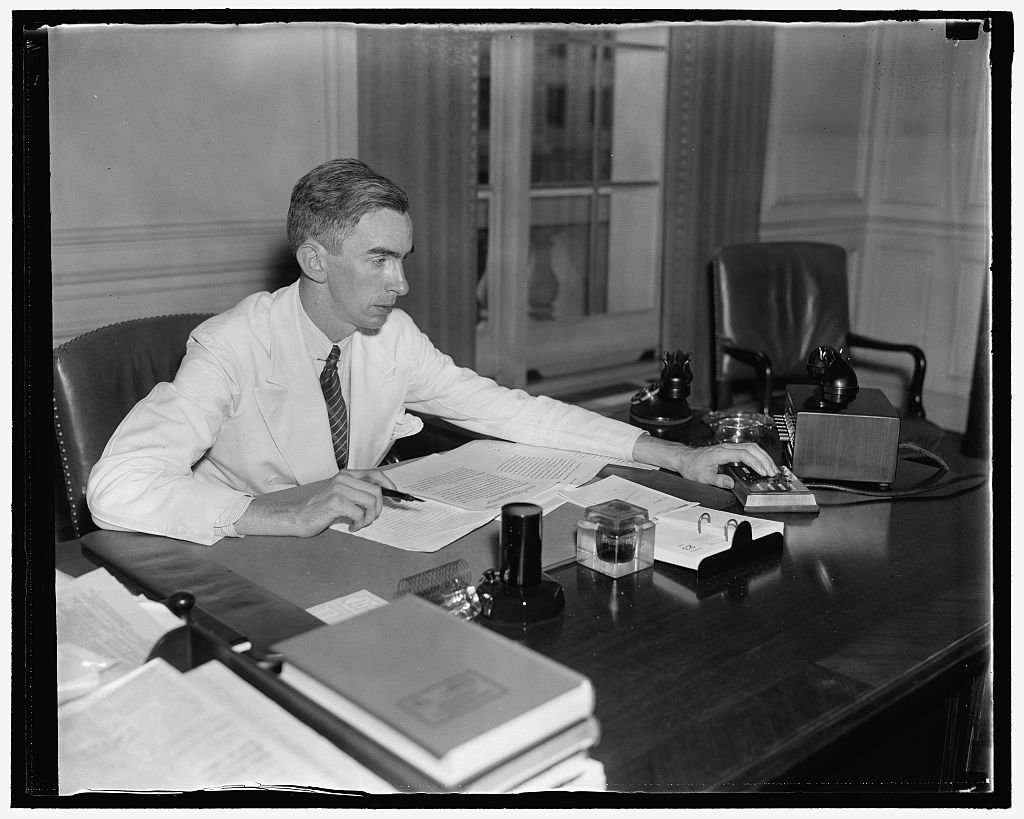

Senior Judge of the District of Columbia Court of Appeals
- In office 1976–1995

Chief Judge of the District of Columbia Court of Appeals
- In office July 24, 1972 – 1976
- Preceded by: Andrew M. Hood
- Succeeded by: Theodore R. Newman Jr.

Judge of the District of Columbia Court of Appeals
- In office 1970–1976
- Nominated by: Richard Nixon
- Succeeded by: Theodore R. Newman Jr.

National Labor Relations Board
- In office 1941–1946

United States Solicitor of Labor
- In office 1937–1941
- Nominated by: Franklin D. Roosevelt

Personal details
- Born: September 27, 1906 Boston, Massachusetts
- Died: May 18, 1995 (aged 88) Washington, D.C.
- Spouse: Eleanor Fahey
- Children: Margaret Ann Reilly Hefern, John Fahey Reilly, Gerard Denis Reilly Jr.
- Education: Harvard College (B.A.); Harvard Law School (LL.B.)

Gerard Denis Reilly (September 27, 1906 – May 18, 1995) was an official at the United States Department of Labor and the chief judge of the District of Columbia Court of Appeals.

Born in Boston, Massachusetts, Reilly received his bachelor's and law degrees at Harvard University, where he was a cross country runner. He moved to Washington, D.C. in 1933 to work at the Labor Department under the new administration of Franklin D. Roosevelt. He served as Solicitor of Labor from 1937 to 1941 and as a member of the National Labor Relations Board, an independent agency from 1941 to 1946. During his time as solicitor, a resolution of impeachment was filed against him and Secretary of Labor Frances Perkins by Republican Representative J. Parnell Thomas, who accused them of refusing to deport labor leader Harry Bridges. The impeachment resolution was rejected by the House Judiciary Committee, but the Republican members of the committee all signed on to a minority report severely censuring the officials.

In 1947, Reilly served as counsel to the Senate Committee on Labor and Public Welfare and helped draft the Taft-Hartley Act. Among other changes in United States labor law, Reilly pushed for a prohibition on secondary boycotts and greater rights for employers, including allowing employers to deliver anti-union messages in the workplace. After the bill's passage, Reilly entered private practice in Washington. From 1957 to 1958, he served as chair of the labor law section of the American Bar Association.

In 1970, President Nixon appointed Reilly to the D.C. Court of Appeals, and in 1972 Nixon elevated him to chief judge. He retired from active duty in 1976 when he reached the mandatory retirement age of 70 but continued serving as a senior judge until his death in a car accident in 1995. As a judge, Reilly was known for his colorful writing style. His brother Thomas F. Reilly served as a Catholic bishop in the Dominican Republic. His law clerks included future federal judge Ann D. Montgomery.
