= Wendell P. Gardner =

American judge (1946–2026)

Associate Judge of the Superior Court of the District of Columbia
- In office 1991 – March 27, 2020
- President: George H. W. Bush
- Preceded by: Annice M. Wagner
- Succeeded by: John Cuong Truong

Personal details
- Born: August 28, 1946 Washington, D.C., U.S.
- Died: October 3, 2026 (aged 80)
- Education: Howard University (BA); Washington University in St. Louis (JD)

Wendell Philip Gardner Jr. (August 28, 1946 – October 3, 2026) was an American judge, who was an associate judge of the Superior Court of the District of Columbia.

== Early life, education and career ==
Wendell Philip Gardner Jr. was born on August 28, 1946. He earned his Bachelor of Arts from Howard University in 1969, and his Juris Doctor from the Washington University School of Law in 1971.

After graduating, he registered lobbyist for Sears, Roebuck & Co. In 1981, he went into private practice.

=== D.C. Superior Court ===
President George H. W. Bush nominated Gardner on January 4, 1991, to a fifteen-year term as an associate judge on the Superior Court of the District of Columbia to the seat vacated by Annice M. Wagner. On June 4, 1991, the Senate Committee on Homeland Security and Governmental Affairs held a hearing on his nomination. On June 27, 1991, the Committee reported his nomination favorably to the senate floor. On June 28, 1991, the full United States Senate confirmed his nomination by unanimous consent. He retired on March 27, 2020.

== Death ==
Gardner died on October 3, 2026, at the age of 80.
