= Frank E. Schwelb =

American judge

Senior Judge of the District of Columbia Court of Appeals
- In office 2006–2014

Associate Judge of the District of Columbia Court of Appeals
- In office 1988–2006
- Nominated by: Ronald Reagan
- Preceded by: Frank Q. Nebeker
- Succeeded by: Anna Blackburne-Rigsby

Judge of the Superior Court of the District of Columbia
- In office 1979–1988
- Nominated by: Jimmy Carter
- Preceded by: William C. Pryor
- Succeeded by: Mildred M. Edwards

Personal details
- Born: Frantisek Arnost Schwelb; June 24, 1932 Prague, Czechoslovakia
- Died: August 13, 2014 (aged 82) Washington, D.C.
- Spouse: Taffy Wurzburg Schwelb
- Parent(s): Egon Schwelb, Caroline Schwelb
- Education: Yale College (B.A.); Harvard University (J.D.)

Frank Ernest Schwelb (June 24, 1932 – August 13, 2014) was a judge of the Superior Court of the District of Columbia and the District of Columbia Court of Appeals.

Schwelb was born in Prague, where his father Egon Schwelb was a Jewish human rights lawyer, and his mom Caroline Schwelb had earned a Ph.D. in German studies from the University of Prague. After the German occupation of Czechoslovakia, Egon Schwelb was arrested by the Gestapo and held for two months. Upon his release, he fled with his family to London, where he was part of the Czechoslovak government-in-exile. Caroline's brother died in the Czechoslovak army whereas her sister died in a concentration camp.

The family moved to the United States in 1947 when Egon became deputy director of the human rights division of the new United Nations. Frank was fifteen years old. He graduated from Yale College in 1953 and Harvard Law School in 1958, serving in the United States Army from 1955 to 1957. After law school Schwelb worked at the New York law firm Mudge, Stern, Baldwin & Todd and then, beginning in 1962, at the United States Department of Justice Civil Rights Division. In 1979, Schwelb was nominated and confirmed to be a trial judge on the Superior Court of the District of Columbia. He was elevated to the District of Columbia Court of Appeals in 1988. He took senior status in 2006 and died in 2014.

Schwelb was noted for his distinctive writing style as a judge. The Washington Post once referred to him as "judge laureate of the D.C. Superior Court." He enjoyed flowery turns of phrase and was known to quote Shakespeare or Gilbert and Sullivan in his opinions. In 1980, he was the victim of a robbery and was shot when he refused to turn over his wallet. In his first opinion back on the bench after a two-month recovery, he wrote about the incident and his assailants, who "unsuccessfully attempted a redistribution of the wealth by demanding the Court’s wallet" and "left a lead bullet in the Court’s abdomen."
