= John Lewis Smith Jr. =

American judge (1912–1992)

Senior Judge of the United States District Court for the District of Columbia
- In office January 31, 1983 – September 4, 1992

Presiding Judge of the United States Foreign Intelligence Surveillance Court
- In office May 19, 1982 – May 19, 1988
- Appointed by: Warren E. Burger
- Preceded by: George Luzerne Hart Jr.
- Succeeded by: James Ellsworth Noland

Chief Judge of the United States District Court for the District of Columbia
- In office September 18, 1981 – September 20, 1982
- Preceded by: William B. Bryant
- Succeeded by: Aubrey Eugene Robinson Jr.

Judge of the United States District Court for the District of Columbia
- In office November 3, 1966 – January 31, 1983
- Appointed by: Lyndon B. Johnson
- Preceded by: Luther Youngdahl
- Succeeded by: Stanley S. Harris

Personal details
- Born: John Lewis Smith Jr. September 20, 1912 Washington, D.C., U.S.
- Died: September 4, 1992 (aged 79) Washington, D.C., U.S.
- Education: Princeton University (A.B.); Georgetown Law (LL.B., LL.M.)

John Lewis Smith Jr. (September 20, 1912 – September 4, 1992) was a United States district judge of the United States District Court for the District of Columbia.

== Education and career ==
Born in Washington, D.C., Smith received an Artium Baccalaureus degree from Princeton University in 1935, a Bachelor of Laws from Georgetown Law in 1938, and a Master of Laws from the same institution in 1939. He was an Assistant United States Attorney for the District of Columbia from 1940 to 1946, and was in the United States Army during World War II, serving as an Air Corps Lieutenant Colonel from 1942 to 1946. He was in private practice in Washington, D.C. from 1946 to 1956. He was Commissioner of the District of Columbia Public Utilities Commission from 1956 to 1957. He was an associate judge of the District of Columbia Court of General Sessions from 1957 to 1959, becoming chief judge of that court from 1959 to 1966.

== Federal judicial service ==
On October 6, 1966, Smith was nominated by President Lyndon B. Johnson to a seat on the United States District Court for the District of Columbia vacated by Judge Luther Youngdahl. Smith was confirmed by the United States Senate on October 20, 1966, and received his commission on November 3, 1966. He served as Chief Judge and as a member of the Judicial Conference of the United States from 1981 to 1982. He was a Judge of the Foreign Intelligence Surveillance Court from 1982 to 1988. He assumed senior status on January 31, 1983. Smith served in that capacity until his death on September 4, 1992, in Washington, D.C.

=== Notable order ===
In 1977, Smith ordered all of the FBI's records concerning Martin Luther King Jr. to be sealed in the National Archives and Records Administration for 50 years.

== Sources ==
Legal offices
| Preceded by Luther Youngdahl | Judge of the United States District Court for the District of Columbia; 1966–1983 | Succeeded by Stanley S. Harris |
| Preceded by William B. Bryant | Chief Judge of the United States District Court for the District of Columbia; 1981–1982 | Succeeded by Aubrey Eugene Robinson Jr. |
| Preceded by George Luzerne Hart Jr. | Presiding Judge of the United States Foreign Intelligence Surveillance Court; 1982–1988 | Succeeded by James Ellsworth Noland |
