= J. Walter Yeagley =

American judge

Senior Judge of the District of Columbia Court of Appeals
- In office 1979–1984

Associate Judge of the District of Columbia Court of Appeals
- In office 1971–1979
- Nominated by: Richard Nixon
- Succeeded by: William C. Pryor

Personal details
- Born: April 20, 1909 Angola, Indiana
- Died: April 28, 1990 (aged 81) West Palm Beach, Florida
- Spouse: Gail Yeagley
- Education: University of Michigan (B.A., J.D.)

J. Walter Yeagley (April 20, 1909 – April 28, 1990) was a judge of the District of Columbia Court of Appeals, the highest court for the District of Columbia.

== Biography ==
Born in Angola, Indiana, Yeagley earned undergraduate and law degrees at the University of Michigan. After eight years in private practice in South Bend, Indiana, he went to work for the federal government, first as an FBI agent and later as an Assistant Attorney General in charge of the Justice Department's Internal Security Division. He served in that capacity from 1959 until 1970. During this time he argued before the Supreme Court in the case of Gojack v. United States, 383 U.S. 702 (1966). He was appointed to the D.C. Court of Appeals in 1970, was confirmed by the Senate on May 26, 1971, took senior status in 1979, and retired to Riviera Beach, Florida, in 1984.

== Sources ==
- Hearing Before the Committee on the District of Columbia, U.S. Senate, 91st Congress, Second Session, on Judicial Nominations for District of Columbia Courts, October 12, 1970.
