= Eric T. Washington =

American judge (born 1953)

Eric Washington
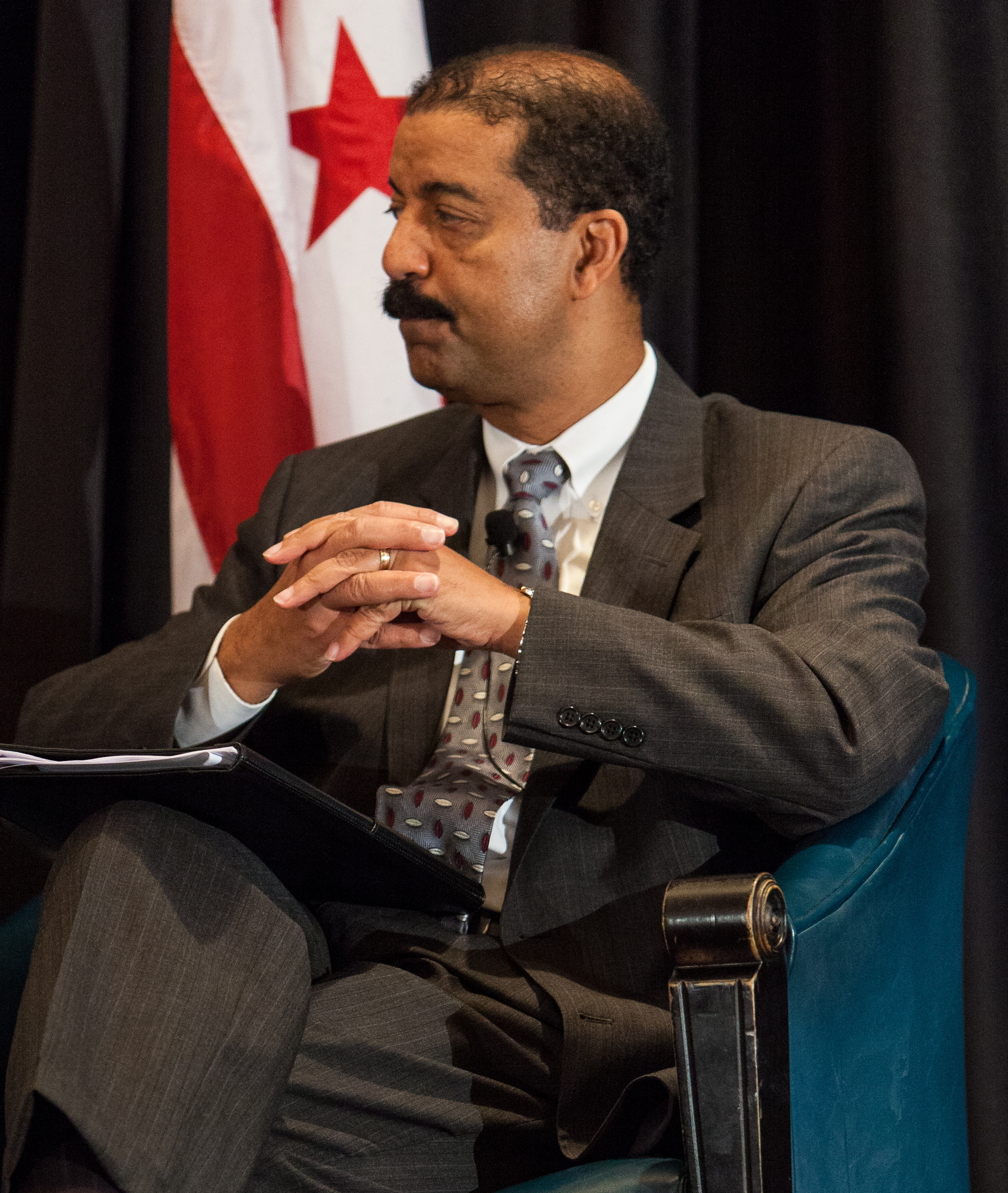
- Washington in 2012

Senior Judge of the District of Columbia Court of Appeals
- Incumbent
- Assumed office March 20, 2017

Chief Judge of the District of Columbia Court of Appeals
- In office August 6, 2005 – March 18, 2017
- Preceded by: Annice M. Wagner
- Succeeded by: Anna Blackburne-Rigsby

Judge of the District of Columbia Court of Appeals
- In office July 1, 1999 – March 18, 2017
- Appointed by: Bill Clinton
- Preceded by: Warren R. King
- Succeeded by: Joshua Deahl

Judge of the Superior Court of the District of Columbia
- In office 1995–1999
- Appointed by: Bill Clinton
- Preceded by: Ricardo Urbina
- Succeeded by: Anna Blackburne-Rigsby

Personal details
- Born: December 2, 1953 (age 72) Jersey City, New Jersey, U.S.
- Education: Tufts University, (BA); Columbia University (JD)

Eric T. Washington (born December 2, 1953) is a Senior associate judge of the District of Columbia Court of Appeals. He was appointed to the D.C. Court of Appeals in 1999 by President Bill Clinton and served as chief judge from August 6, 2005, to March 18, 2017.

== Early life and education ==
Washington was born and raised in New Jersey. He graduated in 1976 from Tufts University and received his law degree from the Columbia University School of Law in 1979.

== Career ==
In 1979, Washington began his legal career with the law firm of Fulbright & Jaworski in Houston, Texas, where he engaged in a general labor and employment practice prior to relocating to Washington, D.C. to serve as Legislative Director and Counsel to U.S. Congressman Michael A. Andrews of Texas. He subsequently rejoined Fulbright & Jaworski in Washington, D.C. prior to serving as Special Counsel to the Corporation Counsel (now Attorney General for the District of Columbia) and later as Principal Deputy Corporation Counsel between 1987 and 1989. From January 1990 to May 1995, Washington was a partner in the law firm of Hogan & Hartson, which concluded with his 1995 appointment to the Superior Court of the District of Columbia. As an associate judge in the Superior Court, he presided over various criminal trials as well as cases from the Drug Court, Domestic Violence Unit, tax and probate matters on certification from other judges, and cases involving children who were victims of abuse and neglect.

Washington previously served as co-chair of the Strategic Planning Leadership Council for the District of Columbia Courts and as a member of the Standing Committee on Fairness and Access to the Courts, as well as the Access to Justice Commission.

Washington has served on several committees of the D.C. Bar, including the Criminal Justice Act/Counsel for Child Abuse and Neglect Committee, the Standing Committee on the Federal Judiciary, and the Bar’s Nominating Committee. He also served as a member of the Steering Committee for the D.C. Affairs Sections of the Bar.

Washington serves on the Board of Directors for the Boys and Girls Clubs of Greater Washington and the Board of Directors for the Boys and Girls Clubs Foundation. He formerly served on the Board of Directors for the Einstein Institute for Science, Health and the Courts and currently serves as chair of the Board of Directors of the Advanced Science and Technology Adjudication Standards, Credential and Accreditation Board.

Legal offices
Preceded by Warren R. King	Judge of the District of Columbia Court of Appeals; 1999–2017	Succeeded by Joshua Deahl
Preceded by Annice M. Wagner	Chief Judge of the District of Columbia Court of Appeals; 2006–2017	Succeeded by Anna Blackburne-Rigsby
