= Anna Blackburne-Rigsby =

American judge (born 1961)

Chief Judge of the District of Columbia Court of Appeals
- Incumbent
- Assumed office March 18, 2017
- Preceded by: Eric T. Washington

Judge of the District of Columbia Court of Appeals
- Incumbent
- Assumed office August 2006
- Appointed by: George W. Bush
- Preceded by: Frank E. Schwelb

Judge of the District of Columbia Superior Court
- In office 2000–2006
- Appointed by: Bill Clinton
- Preceded by: Eric T. Washington
- Succeeded by: Heidi Pasichow

Personal details
- Born: Anna Elizabeth Blackburne; May 6, 1961 (age 65) Washington, D.C., U.S.
- Spouse: Robert Rigsby
- Education: Duke University (BA); Howard University (JD)

Anna Elizabeth Blackburne-Rigsby (born May 6, 1961) is the chief judge of the District of Columbia Court of Appeals, the highest appellate court for the District of Columbia.

== Early life and education ==
Born in Washington, D.C., Blackburne-Rigsby graduated from Jamaica High School in Queens, New York, in 1979. She began her collegiate education at Duke University, where she earned a bachelor's degree in political science in 1983 and later received the Duke University Presidential Leadership Award. After graduating, she was one of twelve people chosen to spend time in San Francisco, California, working as a public affairs fellow of the Coro Foundation. In 1987, she received a J.D. degree from the Howard University School of Law, finishing in the top five percent of her class. While there, she also earned the position of Lead Articles Editor for the Howard Law Journal and was also recognized as the Co-Captain for the Charles Hamilton Houston Moot Court Team.

== Career ==
After law school, she spent five years as an associate at Hogan & Hartson (now known as Hogan Lovells US LLP) in D.C. During her time working for the law firm, she argued on matters including education, real estate, commercial, employment discrimination before federal courts. In 1992, she went to work at the office of the Corporation Counsel for D.C., first as a special counsel and then as Deputy Corporation Counsel in charge of the Family Services Division. This division was responsible for protecting and supporting children who experience abuse and neglect as well as domestic violence in their households. In 1995, she became a hearing commissioner at the Superior Court of the District of Columbia, a role later retitled Magistrate Judge. In 2000, President Bill Clinton assigned her the position of Associate Judge in the D.C. Superior Court. During the duration of her time as Associate Judge, she sat on a chair in the District of Columbia Courts' Standing Committee on Fairness and Access and also served on the District of Columbia's Access to Justice Commission. President George W. Bush promoted her to the position of Associate Judge of the Court of Appeals in August 2006, and her latest position of Chief Judge of the Court of Appeals was assigned to her in March 2017. She was reappointed to a new 15-year term in 2021. An advocate for equal rights and justice, Blackburne-Rigsby also has a spot on the board of directors for the National Consortium on Racial and Ethnic Fairness in the Courts and previously served as the Consortium's moderator and President. She currently spends time teaching Trial Advocacy at the Harvard Law School and teaches Professional Responsibility as an adjunct professor. She also teaches courses on Continuing Legal Education at the David A. Clarke School of Law at the University of the District of Columbia.

== Personal life ==
Blackburne-Rigsby is married to Robert Rigsby, an Associate Judge of the Superior Court of the District of Columbia and former Corporation Counsel. Her mother, Laura D. Blackburne, is a former chair of the New York City Housing Authority (1990–1992) and judge on the New York Supreme Court. Several sources have concluded that Laura Blackburne is an extreme influence on Anna's drive to excel in the law field. In 1959, Laura Blackburne graduated from Ohio State University with a degree in dance and choreography. It wasn't until 20 years later that she would attend St. John's University School of Law to get her J.D. degree. She also acquired Honorary Doctor of Law degrees from Niagara University as well as St. John's University. Prior to her mother's retirement, although in different cities, both Anna and Laura would serve as judges at the same time, pursuing their passions in tandem.

Legal offices
Preceded by Frank E. Schwelb	Judge of the District of Columbia Court of Appeals; 2006–present	Incumbent
Preceded by Eric T. Washington	Chief Judge of the District of Columbia Court of Appeals; 2017–present	Incumbent
