= Andrew M. Hood =

American judge

Andrew M. Hood was an American judge who served as chief judge of the District of Columbia Court of Appeals, the highest local court of the District of Columbia.

== Judicial career ==
Hood began his career in 1942. He served on the appellate court of the District of Columbia during the period in which the court system evolved from the Municipal Court of Appeals for the District of Columbia into the modern District of Columbia Court of Appeals. The Municipal Court of Appeals was established in 1942 and was renamed the District of Columbia Court of Appeals in 1962.

== See also ==
- District of Columbia Court of Appeals
