= Angela Davis (reporter) =

Angela Davis is a television and radio reporter based in Minnesota. She currently hosts MPR News with Angela Davis, a daily talk show on MPR News about life in Minnesota and how the state is changing. She has won five regional Emmy Awards for anchoring and covering news on television and a Gracie Award for her work in public media.

Davis graduated from the University of Maryland, College Park, with a degree in journalism. She was inducted into the Hall of Fame at the Philip Merrill College of Journalism in 2024.

== Awards ==
Davis has won or been nominated for the following:

- 2001 Upper Midwest Emmy (won)
- 2002 Upper Midwest Emmy (won)
- 2003 Upper Midwest Emmy (nominated)
- 2015 Upper Midwest Emmy (nominated)
- 2023 Gracie Award (won)

In addition, Davis hosted the 2020 Upper Midwest Emmy Awards.

== Personal life ==
Davis lives in the Highland Park neighborhood of Saint Paul, Minnesota with her husband. They have two children.
