= Andrew Hood (businessman) =

British businessperson and former UK government adviser

- Education: Oxford; London; Harvard Business School
- Occupation: businessman

Andrew Hood is a British businessman and adviser to the Government of the United Kingdom.

== Education ==
Hood was educated at Lord Williams's School, a comprehensive in Thame, Oxfordshire, and at Oxford and London universities. He also completed a short course at Harvard Business School.

== Business ==
Hood is a founding partner at Oxford Research & Analysis, which is a consultancy specialising in complex international investigations and litigation. He is a former managing partner at Brunswick Group LLP, an international strategic advisory firm.

== Government and politics ==
Hood was adviser to the Labour Party front bench on foreign policy from 1994, under Tony Blair. From 1997 to 2000 he worked as political adviser to the Secretary of State in the Foreign and Commonwealth Office, before working in the same role at the Ministry of Defence from 2000 to 2002.

In 1996 Hood led the team working with Robin Cook on the Labour Party's response to the Scott Inquiry. He worked closely with Cook on Labour's preparations for British transfer of Hong Kong's sovereignty to China in 1997. He was part of the Labour Party's negotiating team with the Chinese and Hong Kong governments and was in the UK delegation to the Hong Kong handover. He also worked as a special adviser to the Labour cabinet minister Geoff Hoon.

During the 2016 EU referendum, Hood worked closely with Vote Leave's Gisela Stuart.

In 2020, Hood was appointed as lead non-executive director of the Department for International Trade, taking over the role from Simon Walker. In 2021 it was reported that he had left this role to become a special adviser to Cabinet Office Minister Michael Gove.
