= Vanessa Ruiz =

Puerto Rico-born American judge (born 1950)

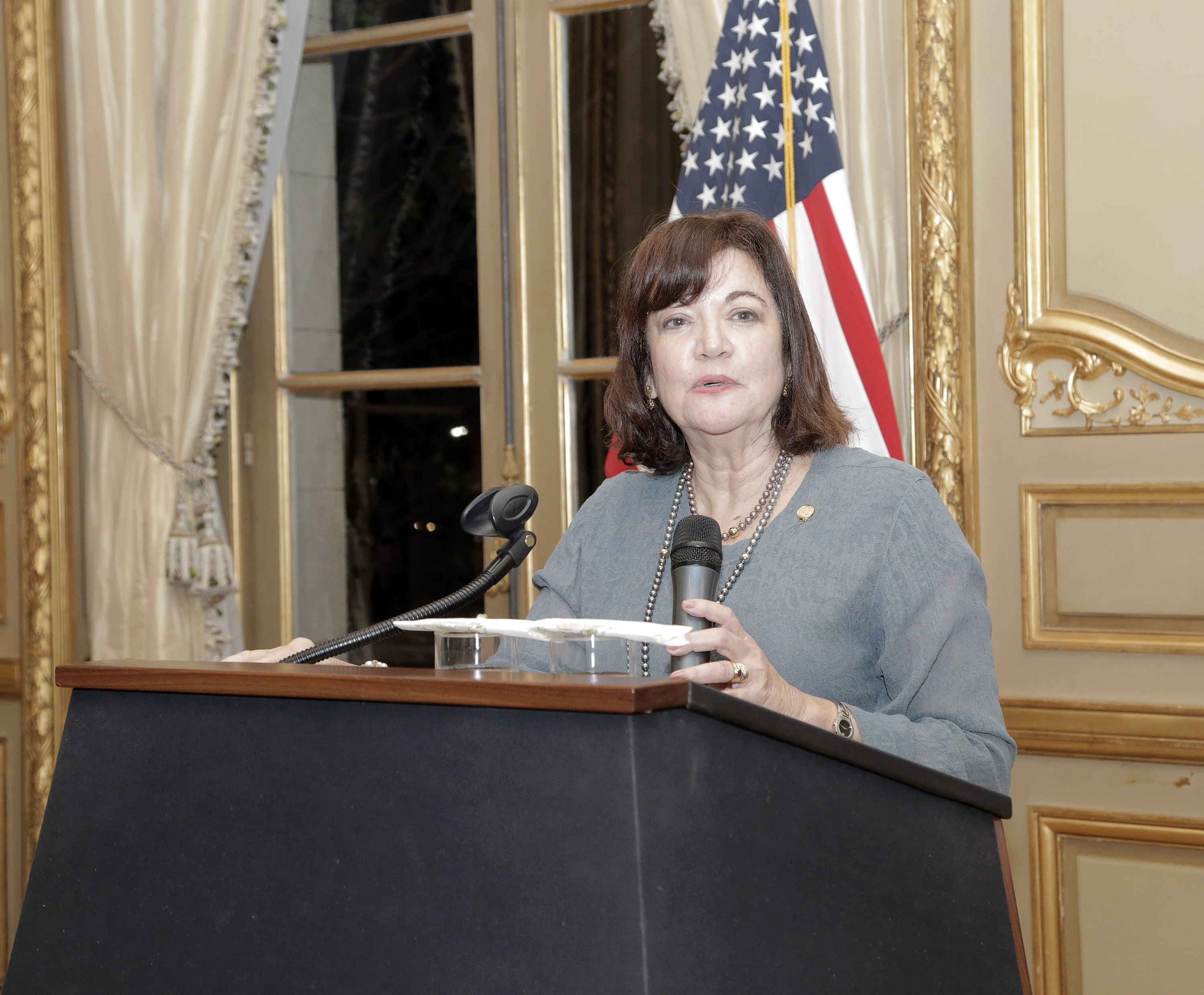
- Ruiz assuming the presidency of the International Association of Women Judges in Argentina, 2018

Senior Judge of the District of Columbia Court of Appeals
- Incumbent
- Assumed office 2012

Associate Judge of the District of Columbia Court of Appeals
- In office October 7, 1994 – August 31, 2011
- Appointed by: Bill Clinton
- Preceded by: Judith Rogers
- Succeeded by: Roy W. McLeese III

Corporation Counsel of the District of Columbia
- In office 1994
- Mayor: Sharon Pratt
- Preceded by: John Payton
- Succeeded by: Erias Hyman (acting)

Personal details
- Born: March 22, 1950 (age 76) San Juan, Puerto Rico
- Spouse(s): Eduardo Elejalde (divorced) David Birenbaum
- Children: 2
- Education: Wellesley College (BA); Georgetown University (JD)

Vanessa Ruiz (born March 22, 1950) is a senior associate judge of the District of Columbia Court of Appeals.

== Biography ==
Ruiz was born in San Juan, Puerto Rico, and graduated from Wellesley College in 1972 with a Bachelor of Arts in philosophy, and in 1975 from Georgetown University Law Center with a Juris Doctor. She was appointed to the Court of Appeals by President Bill Clinton on July 12, 1994, and was confirmed by the U.S. Senate on October 7, 1994. Prior to being appointed to the Court, Ruiz was Corporation Counsel (now called Attorney General of the District of Columbia) for the District of Columbia and an attorney in private practice, primarily in the Washington, D.C., office of Fried, Frank, Harris, Shriver & Jacobson. Early in her career, Ruiz was one of the first women to argue a case before the United States Supreme Court, successfully representing a fair housing organization and its testers in Havens Realty Corp. v. Coleman, 455 U.S. 363 (1982), a seminal case setting the new standard for organizational standing in federal court.

Stanley Woodward served as a law clerk for Ruiz from 2008-09.

Ruiz is a past president of the National Association of Women Judges., and from 2018 to 2020 served as the President of the International Association of Women Judges. She is also a member of the American Law Institute and serves on the board of trustees for the Carnegie Endowment for International Peace.

Ruiz was married to Eduardo Elejalde from 1972 until 1982. She went on to marry David E. Birenbaum, a retired partner of Fried Frank Harris Shriver & Jacobson and former US Ambassador to the United Nations for Management and Reform.

In 2023, Ruiz was one of three recipients of the 2023 Wellesley College Alumnae Awards, a highly selective award announced annually, and attended an on-campus reception on October 20, 2023.

== See also ==
- List of female state attorneys general in the United States
- List of Hispanic and Latino American jurists

== Sources ==
Legal offices
Preceded by John Payton	Corporation Counsel of the District of Columbia; 1994	Succeeded by Erias Hyman; Acting
Preceded by Judith W. Rogers	Judge of the District of Columbia Court of Appeals; 1994-2011	Succeeded by Roy W. McLeese III
