= John A. Terry =

American judge (1933–2021)

Senior Judge of the District of Columbia Court of Appeals
- In office February 2006 – 2016

Associate Judge of the District of Columbia Court of Appeals
- In office 1982–2006
- Nominated by: Ronald Reagan
- Preceded by: Stanley S. Harris
- Succeeded by: Phyllis D. Thompson

Personal details
- Born: May 6, 1933 Utica, New York, U.S.
- Died: September 5, 2021 (aged 88) Bethesda, Maryland, U.S.
- Education: Yale College (BA); Georgetown University Law Center (JD)

John Alfred Terry (May 6, 1933 – September 5, 2021) was a judge of the District of Columbia Court of Appeals, the highest court for the District of Columbia.

Born in Utica, New York, Terry was raised in St. Louis, Missouri, and attended John Burroughs School. He graduated magna cum laude from Yale University in 1954 before enrolling at Georgetown University Law Center in 1957. In 1962, he joined the United States Attorney's Office for the District of Columbia. Beginning in 1969, he served as chief of the appellate division for 13 years until he was appointed to the District of Columbia Court of Appeals in 1982. He took senior status in 2006. Terry died in September 2021.

== Sources ==
- Interview with Hon. John A. Terry, Oral History Project, Historical Society of the District of Columbia Circuit
