= John R. Fisher =

American judge (born 1946)

Senior Judge of the District of Columbia Court of Appeals
- In office August 22, 2020 – August 22, 2024

Associate Judge of the District of Columbia Court of Appeals
- In office January 6, 2006 – August 22, 2020
- Nominated by: George W. Bush
- Preceded by: Annice M. Wagner
- Succeeded by: Loren AliKhan

Personal details
- Born: August 22, 1946 (age 80) Mount Vernon, Ohio, U.S.
- Spouse: Margaret Fisher
- Education: Harvard College (BA, JD)

John Robert Fisher (born August 22, 1946) is a former associate judge of the District of Columbia Court of Appeals. Prior to joining the court in 2005, Fisher was chief of the appellate division at the United States Attorney's Office for the District of Columbia for over sixteen years. Fisher received both his undergraduate and law degrees from Harvard University. In between, he served in the United States Army for two years and served a tour of duty in Vietnam. Judge Fisher had experience in civil law when he served as Of Counsel to the law firm of Vorys, Sater, Seymour & Pease where he specialized in complex civil litigation. Fisher took senior status on August 22, 2020.

== Sources ==
- Interview with Hon. John Fisher, Oral History Project, Historical Society of the District of Columbia Circuit
- Biographical Sketch: Hon. John Robert Fisher, Historical Society of the District of Columbia Circuit
