= Warren R. King =

American judge

Senior Judge of the District of Columbia Court of Appeals
- In office 1998–2016

Associate Judge of the District of Columbia Court of Appeals
- In office 1991–1998
- Nominated by: George H. W. Bush
- Preceded by: Theodore R. Newman
- Succeeded by: Eric T. Washington

Judge of the Superior Court of the District of Columbia
- In office 1981–1991
- Nominated by: Ronald Reagan
- Preceded by: Fred L. McIntyre
- Succeeded by: Ann O. Keary

Personal details
- Born: Warren Roger King; May 9, 1937 (age 89) Takoma Park, Maryland
- Spouse: Joyce Hanahan Deroy
- Education: Rensselaer Polytechnic Institute (B.E.); American University (J.D.); Yale University (LL.M.)

Warren Roger King (born May 9, 1937) is a former judge of the Superior Court of the District of Columbia and the District of Columbia Court of Appeals.

== Biography ==
King was raised in Washington, D.C., and Maryland. He graduated from Rensselaer Polytechnic Institute in 1960 and served in the United States Navy. In 1969 he returned to D.C. and joined the U.S. Attorney's office, where he prosecuted cases at the trial and appellate levels. In 1975, he left the U.S. Attorney's office to teach at the Antioch School of Law. In 1981, he became a Superior Court judge, and in 1991 he was elevated to the appeals court. He took senior status in 1998 and retired from the bench in 2016.
