= Roy W. McLeese III =

American judge

Roy McLeese
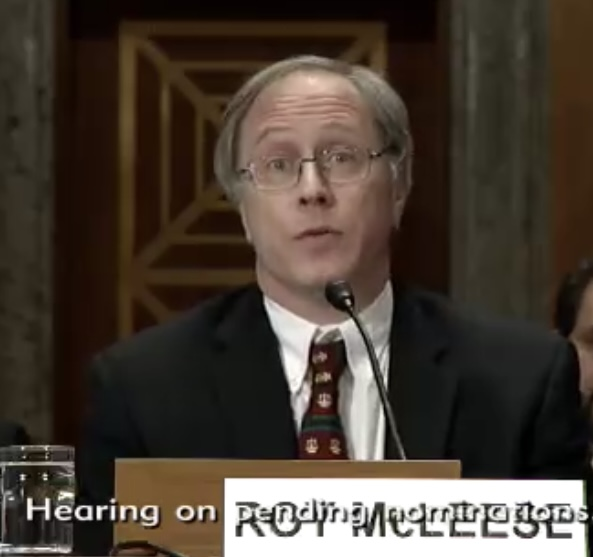

Judge of the District of Columbia Court of Appeals
- Incumbent
- Assumed office September 21, 2012
- Appointed by: Barack Obama
- Preceded by: Vanessa Ruiz

Personal details
- Born: Roy Wallace McLeese III; December 7, 1959 (age 66) Evanston, Illinois, U.S.
- Spouse: Virginia A. Seitz
- Education: Harvard University (BA); New York University (JD)

Roy Wallace McLeese III (born December 7, 1959) is an American lawyer and jurist serving as an associate judge of the District of Columbia Court of Appeals.

== Life and career ==
McLeese was born on December 7, 1959, in Evanston, Illinois. He graduated from Harvard University in 1981 with a Bachelor of Arts, cum laude. He then attended the New York University School of Law, where he was editor-in-chief of the New York University Law Review. He graduated in 1985 with a Juris Doctor, cum laude, and membership in the Order of the Coif.

After law school, McLeese was a law clerk to then-judge Antonin Scalia of the U.S. Court of Appeals for the District of Columbia Circuit from 1985 to 1986. After Scalia was appointed to the U.S. Supreme Court in 1986, McLeese again clerked for him from 1986 to 1987.

McLeese spent his legal career at the United States Department of Justice and the U.S. Attorney's office in the District of Columbia before his nomination to the bench by President Barack Obama in 2011.

== See also ==
- List of law clerks for the ninth seat of the Supreme Court of the United States

Legal offices
Preceded by Vanessa Ruiz	Judge of the District of Columbia Court of Appeals; 2012–present	Incumbent
