= William C. Pryor =

American judge (1932–2020)

Senior Judge of the District of Columbia Court of Appeals
- In office November 2, 1988 – April 3, 2019

Chief Judge of the District of Columbia Court of Appeals
- In office 1984–1988
- Preceded by: Theodore R. Newman, Jr.
- Succeeded by: Judith W. Rogers

Judge of the District of Columbia Court of Appeals
- In office July 27, 1979 – November 2, 1988
- Nominated by: Jimmy Carter
- Preceded by: J. Walter Yeagley
- Succeeded by: Michael W. Farrell

Judge of the Superior Court of the District of Columbia
- In office 1968–1979
- Nominated by: Lyndon Johnson
- Succeeded by: Frank E. Schwelb

Personal details
- Born: May 29, 1932 Washington, D.C.
- Died: November 19, 2020 (aged 88) Silver Spring, Maryland
- Spouse: Elaine Victoria Bruce Pryor (m. 1956)
- Children: William B. Pryor, Stephen Pryor
- Education: Dartmouth College (B.A.); Georgetown University Law Center (J.D.); University of Virginia School of Law (LL.M.)

William C. Pryor (May 29, 1932 – November 19, 2020) was a judge of the District of Columbia Court of Appeals, the highest court for the District of Columbia. He was the court's second African-American chief judge, serving from 1984 to 1988.

== Early life and education ==
Pryor was born and raised in Washington, D.C., where he attended the city's segregated public schools. He met his future wife Elaine at Banneker Junior High School in 1945. After a year of high school at Dunbar High School, Pryor attended boarding school at the Northfield Mount Hermon School in Massachusetts.

As an undergraduate at Dartmouth College, Pryor was a pre-med student and played basketball. He graduated from college in 1954, the same year the Supreme Court held segregation in public schools unconstitutional in Brown v. Board of Education. Pryor later recalled, "As much as anything, I think the Brown decision got me to start thinking about becoming a lawyer."

To fulfill a ROTC obligation, Pryor first joined the army and was assigned to an ammunition company in France. During his service, in June 1955, he and Elaine were married in Paris.

After his tour of duty, Pryor attended Georgetown University Law Center and graduated in 1959 with good grades.

== Career ==
Pryor had trouble finding work as a black attorney in the private sector. Instead he went to work at the Justice Department, first at the Civil Division and then the United States Attorney's Office in D.C.

In 1968, after an interval as an attorney for the Bell Telephone Company, Pryor was appointed by President Lyndon B. Johnson to the District of Columbia Court of General Sessions, the predecessor to the Superior Court of the District of Columbia. His first days on the bench were immediately after the 1968 Washington, D.C. riots following the assassination of Martin Luther King Jr., and some of the defendants who appeared before him were schoolmates of his and others from a similar background. Looking back on this time, Judge Pryor later reflected, "There had to be some kind of discipline, but at the same time, I did feel some empathy for the people brought before the court. This conflict had been percolating for a long time, and now it was coming into the open. In those cases where serious crimes had been committed I applied the appropriate legal standards, even though I did feel for the people involved. I felt it was important to make a clear distinction: rioting and looting was not an expression of civil rights, nor was it an appropriate form of protest, it was criminal conduct."

After a decade on the trial court, Pryor was appointed by President Jimmy Carter to the District of Columbia Court of Appeals on May 18, 1979, and was confirmed by the Senate on July 27, 1979. After serving as chief judge from 1984 to 1988, Pryor assumed senior status and continued to hear cases until 2019. Beginning in 1988, he taught criminal law and procedure at the University of the District of Columbia David A. Clarke School of Law.

Judge Pryor died November 19, 2020, in an assisted living facility in Silver Spring, Md., from renal failure.

== Sources ==
- Pryor Is Named to Top D.C. Appeals Court Post, Jet, October 29, 1984. p. 30.
