= Angela J. Davis =

American law professor

Academic background
- Education: Howard University (BA); Harvard Law School (JD)

Academic work
- Discipline: Legal scholar
- Institutions: American University Washington College of Law
- Main interests: criminal law, prosecutorial power, racism, criminal justice

Angela J. Davis, professor of law at the American University's Washington College of Law, is an expert in criminal law and procedure with a specific focus on prosecutorial power and racism in the criminal justice system. She is the author of Arbitrary Justice: The Power of the American Prosecutor, published in 2009.
