= District of Columbia Judicial Nomination Commission =

Panel that selects judges in Washington D.C.

The District of Columbia Judicial Nominating Commission is the judicial nominating commission of Washington D.C. It selects potential judges for the Superior Court of the District of Columbia and the District of Columbia Court of Appeals.

== Duties ==
When there occurs a vacancy on the Superior Court of the District of Columbia or the District of Columbia Court of Appeals, the commission, which consists of a seven-member panel, is responsible for creating a list of three candidates to fill vacant positions on the District's judiciary. Members of the commission serve for 6-year terms, except for the member nominated by the president, who serves a 5-year term. The commission then sends the list to the President of the United States who selects one nominee to fill the position. The nomination is then sent to the United States Senate for confirmation. Judges serves a fifteen-year term.

The commission is also responsible on selecting the chief judges on the courts to their four-year term.

== Members ==
- Marie C. Johns, appointed by the Council of the District of Columbia, is the Chair of the Commission.
- Benjamin F. Wilson, appointed by the Mayor of the District of Columbia, is the Vice-Chair of the Commission.
- Addy R. Schmitt appointed by President Barack Obama, reappointed by President Joe Biden
- Vincent H. Cohen, Jr., appointed by the District of Columbia Bar.
- Yaida O. Ford, appointed by the District of Columbia Bar.
- Linda W. Cropp appointed by the Mayor of the District of Columbia.
- Tanya S. Chutkan, appointed by the Chief Judge of the United States District Court for the District of Columbia

== See also ==
- List of Superior Court of the District of Columbia judges
