= Comus, Maryland =

Unincorporated community in Maryland, U.S.

Coordinates: 39°14′49″N 77°21′00″W

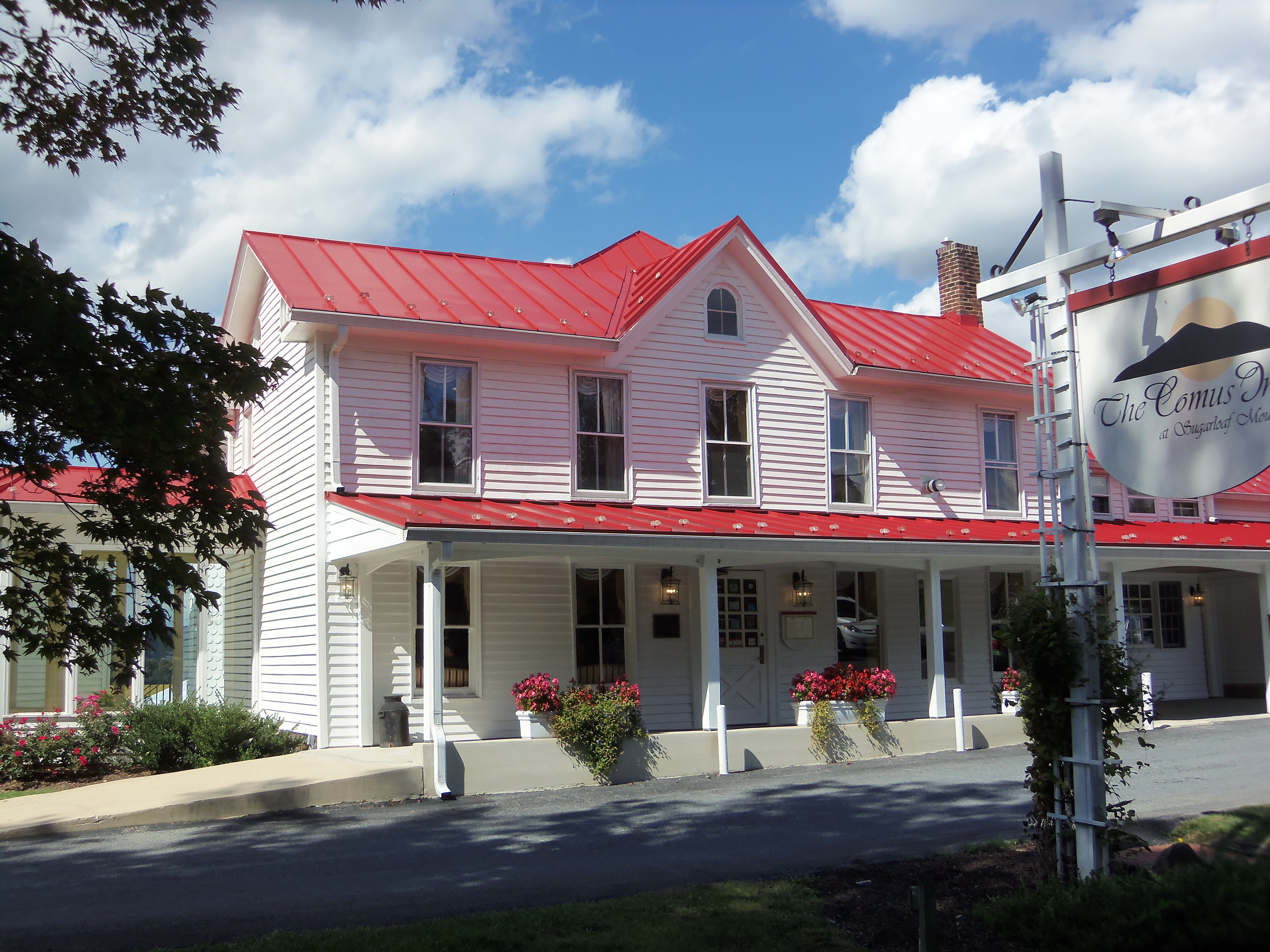
- Comus Inn.
- Country: United States of America
- State: Maryland
- State: Montgomery County
- Elevation: 590 ft (180 m)

Comus is an unincorporated community in Montgomery County, Maryland, United States. The chiefly rural community is located approximately 39.7 miles (63.9 km) by car from Washington D.C.
