= Judith W. Rogers =

American judge (born 1939)

Judith Rogers
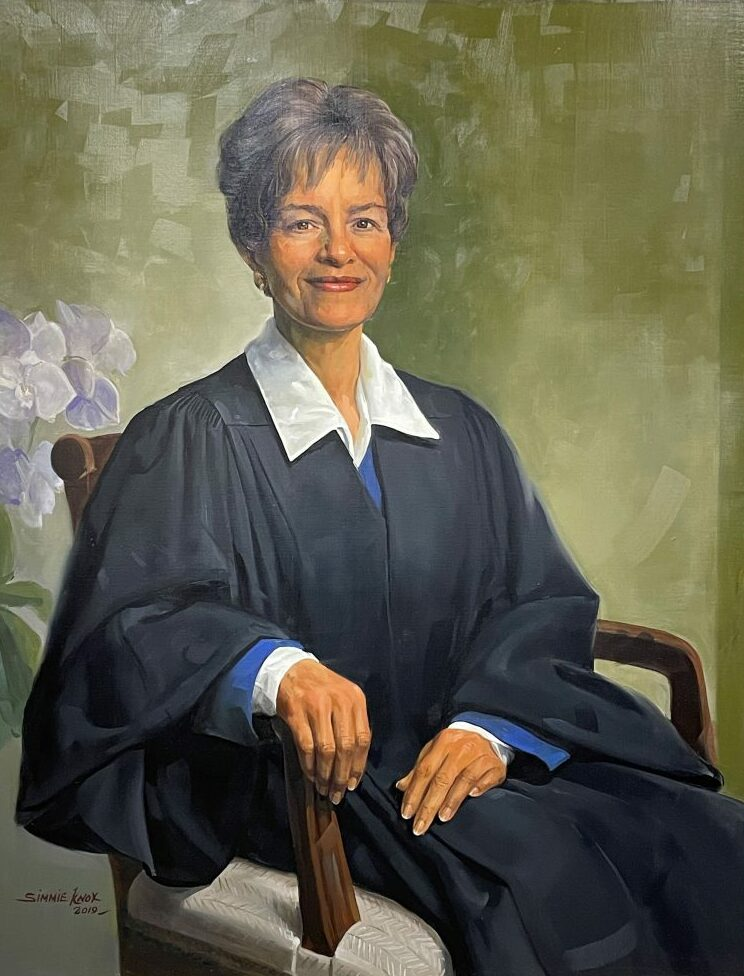
- Official portrait by Simmie Knox, 2019

Senior Judge of the United States Court of Appeals for the District of Columbia Circuit
- Incumbent
- Assumed office September 1, 2022

Judge of the United States Court of Appeals for the District of Columbia Circuit
- In office March 11, 1994 – September 1, 2022
- Appointed by: Bill Clinton
- Preceded by: Clarence Thomas
- Succeeded by: Brad Garcia

Chief Judge of the District of Columbia Court of Appeals
- In office November 1, 1988 – March 17, 1994
- Preceded by: William C. Pryor
- Succeeded by: Annice M. Wagner

Associate Judge of the District of Columbia Court of Appeals
- In office September 15, 1983 – March 11, 1994
- Appointed by: Ronald Reagan
- Preceded by: Catherine B. Kelly
- Succeeded by: Vanessa Ruiz

Corporation Counsel of the District of Columbia
- In office April 12, 1979 – September 15, 1983
- Mayor: Marion Barry
- Preceded by: Louis Robbins (acting)
- Succeeded by: Inez Smith Reid

Personal details
- Born: Judith Ann Wilson; July 27, 1939 (age 87) New York City, New York, U.S.
- Relatives: John Louis Wilson Jr. (father)
- Education: Radcliffe College (BA); Harvard University (LLB); University of Virginia (LLM)

Judith Ann Wilson Rogers (born July 27, 1939) is a senior United States circuit judge of the United States Court of Appeals for the District of Columbia Circuit.

== Early life and career ==
Judith Ann Wilson was born on July 27, 1939, in New York City. Her father is noted architect John Louis Wilson Jr., known for his work in designing public buildings in New York City.

Rogers received a Bachelor of Arts degree from Radcliffe College in 1961, a Bachelor of Laws from Harvard Law School in 1964, and a Master of Laws from the University of Virginia School of Law in 1988.

After graduating from law school, she was a law clerk at the Juvenile Court of the District of Columbia from 1964 to 1965. She then worked as an Assistant United States Attorney for the District of Columbia from 1965 to 1968, a staff attorney at San Francisco Neighborhood Legal Assistance Foundation from 1968 to 1969, and a trial attorney at the United States Department of Justice Criminal Division from 1969 to 1971. From 1971 to 1972, she was General Counsel for the Congressional Commission on the Organization of the District Government, where she helped develop home rule legislation for the District of Columbia. She worked on legislative affairs in the District government from 1972 to 1979, a period in which the District held its first elections for city council and mayor under the new District of Columbia Home Rule Act. In 1979, Rogers became the first female corporation counsel for the District of Columbia.

In 1983, Rogers became an Associate Judge of the District of Columbia Court of Appeals, the highest court for the District of Columbia. She served as Chief Judge of that court from 1988 to 1994.

== Federal judicial service ==
Rogers was nominated by President Bill Clinton on November 17, 1993, to a seat on the United States Court of Appeals for the District of Columbia Circuit vacated by Judge Clarence Thomas. She was confirmed by the United States Senate on March 10, 1994. She received her commission on March 11, 1994. She became the fourth woman to be appointed to the court. On June 3, 2022, she announced her intent to assume senior status in September 2022. She assumed senior status on September 1, 2022.

In March 2017, Rogers argued the First Amendment provides the public a qualified right to access prisoners' court filings when the court, unanimous in judgment but in divided opinions, found that the press could not access classified video of Jihad Ahmed Mustafa Dhiab being force fed during the Guantanamo Bay hunger strikes.

In August 2017, Rogers partially dissented when the court found that mandatory minimum sentences as applied to the Nisour Square massacre killers were unconstitutional cruel and unusual punishments.

In February 2020, Rogers dissented when the majority held that the United States House Committee on the Judiciary could not enforce a subpoena upon President Trump's former White House Counsel, Don McGahn.

On November 12, 2021, Rogers wrote for the unanimous panel in allowing the USPS regulator to set higher mail rates.

== See also ==
- List of African-American federal judges
- List of African-American jurists
- List of first women lawyers and judges in Washington D.C.

Legal offices
Preceded by Louis Robbins; Acting	Corporation Counsel of the District of Columbia; 1979–1983	Succeeded by Inez Smith Reid
Preceded by Catherine B. Kelly	Judge of the District of Columbia Court of Appeals; 1983–1994	Succeeded by Vanessa Ruiz
Preceded by William C. Pryor	Chief Judge of the District of Columbia Court of Appeals; 1988–1994	Succeeded by Annice M. Wagner
Preceded by Clarence Thomas	Judge of the United States Court of Appeals for the District of Columbia Circuit; 1994–2022	Succeeded by Brad Garcia
