= Theodore R. Newman Jr. =

American judge (1934–2023)

Senior Judge of the District of Columbia Court of Appeals
- In office 1991–2016

Chief Judge of the District of Columbia Court of Appeals
- In office October 26, 1976 – October 2, 1984
- Preceded by: Gerard D. Reilly
- Succeeded by: William C. Pryor

Judge of the District of Columbia Court of Appeals
- In office 1976–1991
- Nominated by: Gerald Ford
- Preceded by: Gerard D. Reilly
- Succeeded by: Warren R. King

Judge of the Superior Court of the District of Columbia
- In office 1970–1976
- Nominated by: Richard Nixon
- Succeeded by: Gladys Kessler

Personal details
- Born: July 5, 1934 Birmingham, Alabama, U.S.
- Died: January 6, 2023 (aged 88) Washington, D.C., U.S.
- Spouse: Constance B. Newman (Divorced)
- Education: Brown University (BA); Harvard Law School (JD)

Theodore R. Newman Jr. (July 5, 1934 – January 6, 2023) was an American judge of the District of Columbia Court of Appeals. He served as the first black chief judge of the court.

== Biography ==
Newman was born on July 5, 1934, in Birmingham, Alabama, and raised in Tuskegee, where his father was a Methodist minister and his mother was a schoolteacher. He graduated from the Mount Herman School for Boys, a boarding school in Massachusetts, in 1951. He went on to earn a bachelor's degree in philosophy from Brown University in 1955 and a Juris Doctor degree from Harvard Law School in 1958. After law school he spent three years as a judge advocate in the United States Air Force stationed in France. On his return to the United States, he moved to Washington, D.C., to work at the United States Department of Justice Civil Rights Division from September 1961 to August 1962. He then entered private practice as an associate at Houston, Bryant & Gardner, a prominent law firm founded by Charles Hamilton Houston and Wendell P. Gardner Sr., where his colleagues included future federal judge William B. Bryant.

In 1970, Newman was named to the Superior Court of the District of Columbia, and in 1976 he was elevated to the D.C. Court of Appeals and designated its new chief judge. He was the first black chief judge of any state-level court system in the United States. At the time, there were fewer than a dozen black judges serving on state appeals courts. In 1979, Ebony named Newman among the one hundred most influential black Americans.

Newman's first term as chief judge expired in 1980, and his attempt to be redesignated for a second term was controversial. The more conservative wing of the court, led by Judge Frank Q. Nebeker, opposed Newman's reappointment, arguing that his behavior at oral argument, at meetings, and outside of court was unbecoming of a judge. In the end Newman was reappointed by the District of Columbia Judicial Nomination Commission for a second four-year term and did not seek reappointment in 1984. In 1991, Newman took senior status, and in 2016 he retired from the court. His former law clerks include law professors Angela J. Davis and Wendy Gordon.

Newman died on January 6, 2023, aged 88, in Washington, D.C.
