= Frank Q. Nebeker =

American judge (1930–2024)

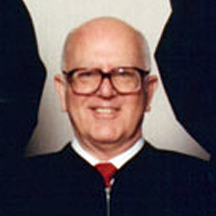

Senior Judge of the United States Court of Appeals for Veterans Claims
- In office November 2000 – December 20, 2021

Chief Judge of the United States Court of Veterans Appeals
- In office October 16, 1989 – November 2000
- Preceded by: Seat established
- Succeeded by: Ken Kramer

Judge of the United States Court of Veterans Appeals
- In office October 16, 1989 – November 2000
- Appointed by: George H. W. Bush
- Preceded by: Seat established
- Succeeded by: Alan Lance

Director of the United States Office of Government Ethics
- In office December 1987 – October 1989
- President: Ronald Reagan; George H. W. Bush
- Preceded by: David H. Martin
- Succeeded by: Stephen D. Potts

Senior Judge of the District of Columbia Court of Appeals
- In office October 1, 1987 – December 2021

Associate Judge of the District of Columbia Court of Appeals
- In office January 20, 1969 – October 1, 1987
- Nominated by: Richard Nixon
- Succeeded by: Frank E. Schwelb

Personal details
- Born: Frank Quill Nebeker; April 23, 1930 Salt Lake City, Utah, U.S.
- Died: January 4, 2024 (aged 93) Arlington, Virginia, U.S.
- Education: Weber College (AA); University of Utah BA American University (JD)

Frank Quill Nebeker (April 23, 1930 – January 4, 2024) was an American jurist who served as a judge of the United States Court of Appeals for Veterans Claims and the District of Columbia Court of Appeals.

== Life and career ==
Born in Utah, Nebeker received an associate degree in history from Weber College, a bachelor's degree in political science from the University of Utah, and a Juris Doctor from American University. During his law school years, Nebeker worked as a correspondence secretary in the White House. He began his legal career in 1956 as a trial attorney in the Internal Security Division of the Department of Justice. Two years later, he became an Assistant United States Attorney for the District of Columbia, serving from 1962 to 1969 as the Chief of the Appellate Division. His reputation as an appellate counsel led to his appointment in 1969 as an Associate Judge on the District of Columbia Court of Appeals, where he had a reputation as a judicial conservative. He led several of his colleagues in opposition to Chief Judge Theodore R. Newman Jr., the first black chief judge of the court. He retired from the D.C. Court of Appeals in 1987, and served as a senior judge of that court until December 2021.

Nebeker's retirement was short. He was confirmed as Director of the Office of Government Ethics, responsible for developing and monitoring the rules which govern the conduct of those in the Executive Branch, and served from December 1987 to October 1989. When Congress provided for judicial review of veterans benefits decisions and created the U.S. Court of Veterans Appeals (now the U.S. Court of Appeals for Veterans Claims), President George H. W. Bush appointed Nebeker, with the consent of the Senate, to be its first Chief Judge.

In November 2000, he retired from the U.S. Court of Appeals for Veterans Claims and served in recall status until December 20, 2021.

Nebeker died in Arlington, Virginia, on January 4, 2024, at the age of 93.
