= District of Columbia Court of Appeals =

Highest court of Washington D.C.

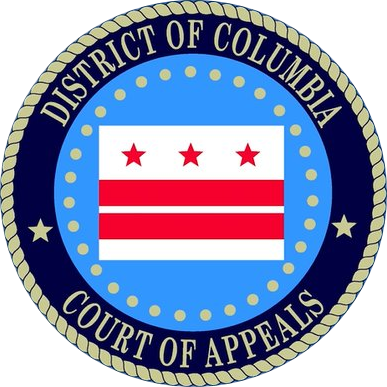
- Interactive map of District of Columbia Court of Appeals
- 38°53′43″N 77°1′4″W
- Established: 1942
- Location: District of Columbia City Hall, Judiciary Square, Washington, DC
- Coordinates: 38°53′43″N 77°1′4″W
- Composition method: Presidential nomination with Senate confirmation
- Authorised by: Derived from the United States Congress
- Appeals to: Supreme Court of the United States (in matters of federal law only)
- Appeals from: Superior Court of the District of Columbia
- Judge term length: 15 years
- Number of positions: 9
- Website: dccourts.gov/court-of-appeals

Chief judge
- Currently: Anna Blackburne-Rigsby
- Since: March 17, 2017

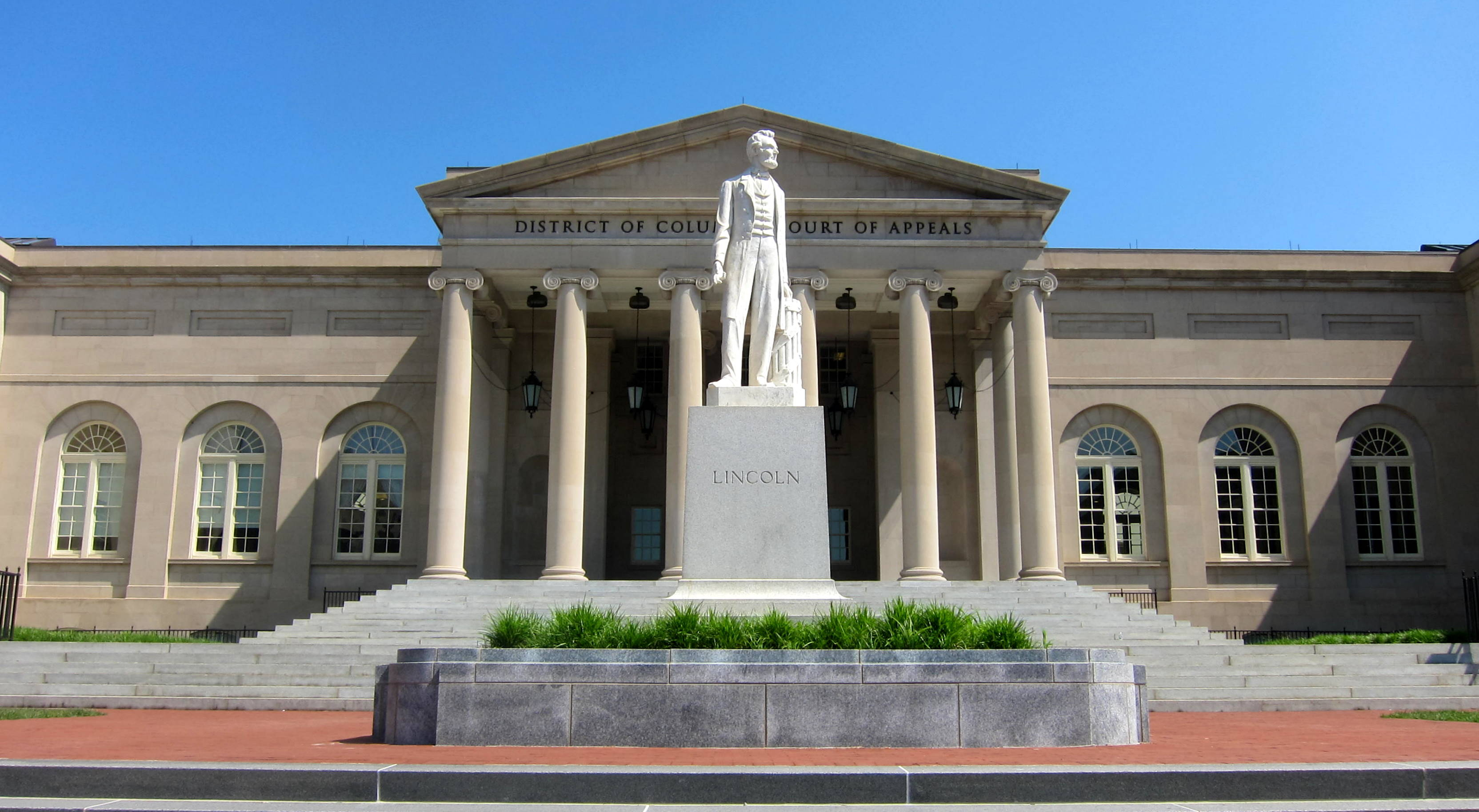
The D.C. Court of Appeals location in the former D.C. City Hall.

The District of Columbia Court of Appeals is the local (non-federal) highest court of the District of Columbia. The court was established in 1942 as the Municipal Court of Appeals, and it has been the court of last resort for matters of local D.C. law since 1970. It and the Superior Court of the District of Columbia compose the District of Columbia's court system. It is located in the former District of Columbia City Hall building at Judiciary Square.

The D.C. Court of Appeals is the equivalent of a state supreme court. Because the District of Columbia is not a U.S. state, the court's authority derives from the U.S. Congress rather than from the inherent sovereignty of the states.

Due to their similar names, the D.C. Court of Appeals is sometimes confused with the U.S. Court of Appeals for the District of Columbia Circuit, which is the federal U.S. court of appeals that covers the District of Columbia.

== History ==
For much of the history of the District of Columbia, appeals in local matters were adjudicated by federal courts: first the Circuit Court of the District of Columbia (1801–1863), then the Supreme Court of the District of Columbia (1863–1893) (later renamed the U.S. District Court for the District of Columbia), and finally the District of Columbia Court of Appeals (1893–1970) (later renamed the U.S. Court of Appeals for the District of Columbia Circuit). The first local appellate court was established in 1942 when Congress created the Municipal Court of Appeals to hear appeals from the D.C. Municipal Court and the Juvenile Court. Consisting of a Chief Judge and two Associate Judges, the Municipal Court of Appeals acted as an intermediate appellate court, its decisions reviewable on a discretionary basis by the D.C. Circuit. In 1962, Congress renamed the court the District of Columbia Court of Appeals, and in 1967 its membership was enlarged to six judges.

Federal and local jurisdiction in the D.C. remained entangled until 1970, when Congress enacted the District of Columbia Court Reform and Criminal Procedure Act (84 Stat. 473). In addition to establishing the Superior Court of the District of Columbia, the Act established the District of Columbia Court of Appeals as the "highest court for the District of Columbia," expanded its size to its present composition of nine judges, and broadened its jurisdiction to hear all appeals from the Superior Court and review decisions of the city's mayor and administrative agencies.

== Powers ==
As the court of last resort for the District of Columbia, the Court of Appeals is authorized to review all final orders, judgments, and specified interlocutory orders of the associate judges of the Superior Court of the District of Columbia, as well as decisions of certain D.C. agencies. The court also has jurisdiction to review decisions of administrative agencies, boards, and commissions of the District government, as well as to answer questions of law presented by the Supreme Court of the United States, a United States court of appeals, or the highest appellate court of any state. As authorized by Congress, the court reviews proposed rules of the trial court and develops its own rules for proceedings.

Cases before the court are determined by randomly selected three-judge divisions, unless a hearing or rehearing before the court sitting en banc (with all judges present) is ordered. A hearing or rehearing before the court sitting en banc may be ordered by a majority of the judges in regular active service, generally only when consideration by the full court is necessary to maintain uniformity of its decisions, or when the case involves a question of exceptional importance. The en banc court consists of the nine judges of the court in regular active service, except that a retired judge may sit to rehear a case or controversy if the judge heard the original hearing. The Chief Judge may designate and assign temporarily one or more judges of the Superior Court of the District of Columbia to serve on the District of Columbia Court of Appeals when required.

Members of the court are empowered to adjudicate the oath of office ceremony for the executive cabinet of the president.

In the exercise of its inherent power over members of the legal profession, the court established the District of Columbia Bar and has the power to approve the rules governing attorney disciplinary proceedings. The court also reviews the rules of professional conduct and has established rules governing the admission of members of the District of Columbia Bar and the resolution of complaints concerning the unauthorized practice of law in the District of Columbia.

== Judges ==
The court consists of a chief judge and eight associate judges. The court is assisted by the service of retired judges who have been recommended and approved as senior judges. Despite being the District's local appellate court, judges are appointed by the president of the United States and confirmed by the U.S. Senate for 15-year terms. In 2011, the district's judicial conduct entity, the Commission on Judicial Disabilities and Tenure, gained the ability to reappoint judges that it deems "well qualified" for subsequent 15-year terms without input from the president or senate. If the commission deems the judge "qualified," the president has the option of renominating them, but if the commission deems the judge "unqualified," they are ineligible for reappointment. In 2021, the commission reappointed Chief Judge Anna Blackburne-Rigsby to a new 15-year term.

=== Active judges ===
As of August 26, 2026:

#	Title	Judge	Duty station	Born	Term of service			Appointed by
#	Title	Judge	Duty station	Born	Active	Chief	Senior	Appointed by
36	Chief Judge	Anna Blackburne-Rigsby	Washington, D.C.	1961	2006–present	2017–present	—	G.W. Bush
39	Judge	Corinne A. Beckwith	Washington, D.C.	1963	2011–present	—	—	Obama
40	Judge	Catharine F. Easterly	Washington, D.C.	1970	2012–present	—	—	Obama
41	Judge	Roy W. McLeese III	Washington, D.C.	1959	2012–present	—	—	Obama
42	Judge	Joshua Deahl	Washington, D.C.	1981	2020–present	—	—	Trump
43	Judge	John P. Howard III	Washington, D.C.	1984	2022–present	—	—	Biden
45	Judge	Vijay Shanker	Washington, D.C.	1972	2022–present	—	—	Biden
46	Judge	Stuart G. Nash	Washington, D.C.	1965	2026–present	—	—	Trump
47	Judge	James Crowell	Washington, D.C.	1973	2026–present	—	—	Trump
24	Senior Judge	John M. Steadman	Washington, D.C.	1930	1985–2004	—	2004–2026	Reagan
30	Senior Judge	Vanessa Ruiz	Washington, D.C.	1950	1994–2011	—	2012–present	Clinton
32	Senior Judge	Stephen H. Glickman	Washington, D.C.	1945	1999–2022	—	2022–present	Clinton
33	Senior Judge	Eric T. Washington	Washington, D.C.	1953	1999–2017	2005–2017	2017–present	Clinton
37	Senior Judge	Phyllis D. Thompson	Washington, D.C.	1952	2006–2021	—	2021–present	G.W. Bush

== Former judges ==
#	Judge	State	Born–died	Active service	Chief Judge	Senior status	Appointed by	Reason for termination
1	William E. Richardson	DC	1881–1945	1942–1945	1942–1945	—	F. Roosevelt	death
2	Nathan Cayton	DC	1899–1977	1942–1956	1946–1956	1956–1972	F. Roosevelt	retirement
3	Andrew M. Hood	DC	1900–1979	1942–1972	1961–1972	—	F. Roosevelt	retirement
4	Brice Clagett	MD	1889–1951	1946–1951	—	—	Truman	death
5	Thomas D. Quinn	DC	1898–1975	1951–1966	—	—	Truman	retirement
6	Leo A. Rover	DC	1888–1960	1956–1960	1956–1960	—	Eisenhower	death
7	Frank H. Myers	DC	1897–1974	1962–1969	—	—	Kennedy	retirement
8	Catherine B. Kelly	DC	1917–1995	1967–1983	—	—	Johnson	resignation
9	Austin L. Fickling	DC	1914–1977	1968–1977	—	—	Johnson	death
10	John W. Kern III	MD	1928–2018	1968–1984	—	1984–2012	Johnson	retirement
11	George R. Gallagher	MD	1915–2007	1968–1981	—	1981–2001	Johnson	retirement
12	Frank Q. Nebeker	VA	1930–2024	1969–1987	—	1987–2021	Nixon	retirement
13	Gerard D. Reilly	DC	1906–1995	1970–1976	1972–1976	1976–1995	Nixon	death
14	Hubert Pair	DC	1904–1988	1971–1974	—	1975–1988	Nixon	death
15	J. Walter Yeagley	VA	1909–1990	1971–1979	—	1979–1984	Nixon	retirement
16	Stanley S. Harris	MD	1927–2021	1972–1982	—	—	Nixon	resignation
17	Julia Cooper Mack	DC	1920–2014	1975–1989	—	1989–2001	Ford	retirement
18	Theodore R. Newman Jr.	DC	1934–2023	1976–1991	1976–1984	1991–2016	Ford	retirement
19	John M. Ferren	DC	1937–present	1977–1997	—	1999–2023	Carter	retirement
20	William C. Pryor	DC	1932–2020	1979–1988	1984–1988	1988–2019	Carter	retirement
21	James A. Belson	DC	1931–present	1981–1991	—	1991–2017	Reagan	retirement
22	John A. Terry	DC	1933–2021	1982–2006	—	2006–2016	Reagan	retirement
23	Judith W. Rogers	DC	1939–present	1983–1994	1988–1994	—	Reagan	elevation
25	Frank E. Schwelb	DC	1932–2014	1988–2006	—	2006–2014	Reagan	retirement
26	Michael W. Farrell	DC	1938–present	1989–2008	—	2009–2019	G.H.W. Bush	retirement
27	Annice M. Wagner	DC	1937–present	1990–2005	1994–2005	2005–2013	G.H.W. Bush	retirement
28	Warren R. King	DC	1937–present	1991–1998	—	1998–2016	G.H.W. Bush	retirement
29	Emmet G. Sullivan	DC	1947–present	1992–1994	—	—	G.H.W. Bush	elevation
31	Inez Smith Reid	DC	1937–present	1995–2011	—	2011–2017	Clinton	retirement
34	Noël A. Kramer	DC	1945–2018	2005–2011	—	2011–2017	G.W. Bush	retirement
35	John R. Fisher	DC	1946–present	2006–2020	—	2020–2024	G.W. Bush	retirement
38	Kathryn A. Oberly	DC	1950–present	2009–2013	—	—	G.W. Bush	resignation
44	Loren AliKhan	DC	1983–present	2022–2023	—	—	Biden	elevation

== Chief judges ==
The first three chief judges of the Municipal Court of Appeals were nominated and confirmed specifically as chief judges. However, in 1961, the Department of Justice determined that the relevant law was ambiguous enough that President Kennedy could elevate sitting judge Andrew M. Hood as chief judge without submitting a nomination to the Senate for that purpose, as President Truman had done when elevating Nathan Cayton as chief judge in 1946. The Library of Congress issued a legal opinion calling the Department of Justice's determination into question, but Hood remained as chief judge. Since 1973, the chief judge has been selected by the District of Columbia Judicial Nomination Commission for renewable four-year terms.

Chief judge
Richardson	1942–1945
Cayton	1946–1956
Rover	1956–1960
Hood	1961–1972
Reilly	1972–1976
Newman	1976–1984
Pryor	1984–1988
Rogers	1988–1994
Wagner	1994–2005
Washington	2005–2017
Blackburne-Rigsby	2017–present

== Succession of seats ==
The court has nine seats for active judges, numbered in the order in which they were initially filled. Judges who assume senior status enter a kind of retirement in which they remain on the bench but vacate their seats, thus allowing the U.S. President to appoint new judges to fill their seats.

Seat 1
Established on April 1, 1942, by Pub. L. 77–512 as a judgeship for the DC Municipal Court of Appeals
Richardson	DC	1942–1945
Cayton	DC	1946–1956
Rover	DC	1956–1960
Reassigned on October 23, 1962, to the District of Columbia Court of Appeals by Pub. L. 87–873
Myers	DC	1962–1969
Nebeker	VA	1969–1987
Schwelb	DC	1988–2006
Blackburne-Rigsby	DC	2006–present

Seat 2
Established on April 1, 1942, by Pub. L. 77–512 as a judgeship for the DC Municipal Court of Appeals
Cayton	DC	1942–1946
Clagett	MD	1946–1951
Reassigned on October 23, 1962, to the District of Columbia Court of Appeals by Pub. L. 87–873
Quinn	DC	1951–1966
Kelly	DC	1967–1983
Rogers	DC	1983–1994
Ruiz	DC	1994–2011
McLeese	DC	2012–present

Seat 3
Established on April 1, 1942, by Pub. L. 77–512 as a judgeship for the DC Municipal Court of Appeals
Reassigned on October 23, 1962, to the District of Columbia Court of Appeals by Pub. L. 87–873
Hood	DC	1942–1972
Harris	MD	1972–1982
Terry	DC	1982–2006
Thompson	DC	2006–2021
Howard	DC	2022–present

Seat 4
Established on December 8, 1967, by Pub. L. 90–178
Fickling	DC	1968–1977
Ferren	DC	1977–1997
Glickman	DC	1999–2022
Shanker	DC	2022–present

Seat 5
Established on December 8, 1967, by Pub. L. 90–178
Kern	MD	1968–1984
Steadman	DC	1985–2004
Kramer	DC	2005–2011
Easterly	DC	2012–present

Seat 6
Established on December 8, 1967, by Pub. L. 90–178
Gallagher	MD	1968–1981
Belson	DC	1981–1991
Sullivan	DC	1992–1994
Reid	DC	1995–2011
Beckwith	DC	2011–present

Seat 7
Established on July 29, 1970, by Pub. L. 91–358
Reilly	DC	1970–1976
Newman	DC	1976–1991
King	DC	1991–1998
Washington	DC	1999–2017
Deahl	DC	2020–present

Seat 8
Established on July 29, 1970, by Pub. L. 91–358
Pair	DC	1971–1974
Mack	DC	1975–1989
Wagner	DC	1990–2005
Fisher	DC	2006–2020
AliKhan	DC	2022–2023
Nash	DC	2026–present

Seat 9
Established on July 29, 1970, by Pub. L. 91–358
Yeagley	VA	1971–1979
Pryor	DC	1979–1988
Farrell	DC	1989–2008
Oberly	DC	2009–2013
Crowell	DC	2026–present

== See also ==
- Superior Court of the District of Columbia
- United States District Court for the District of Columbia
