= Mount Zion Baptist Church (Arlington, Virginia) =

Church in Virginia, United States

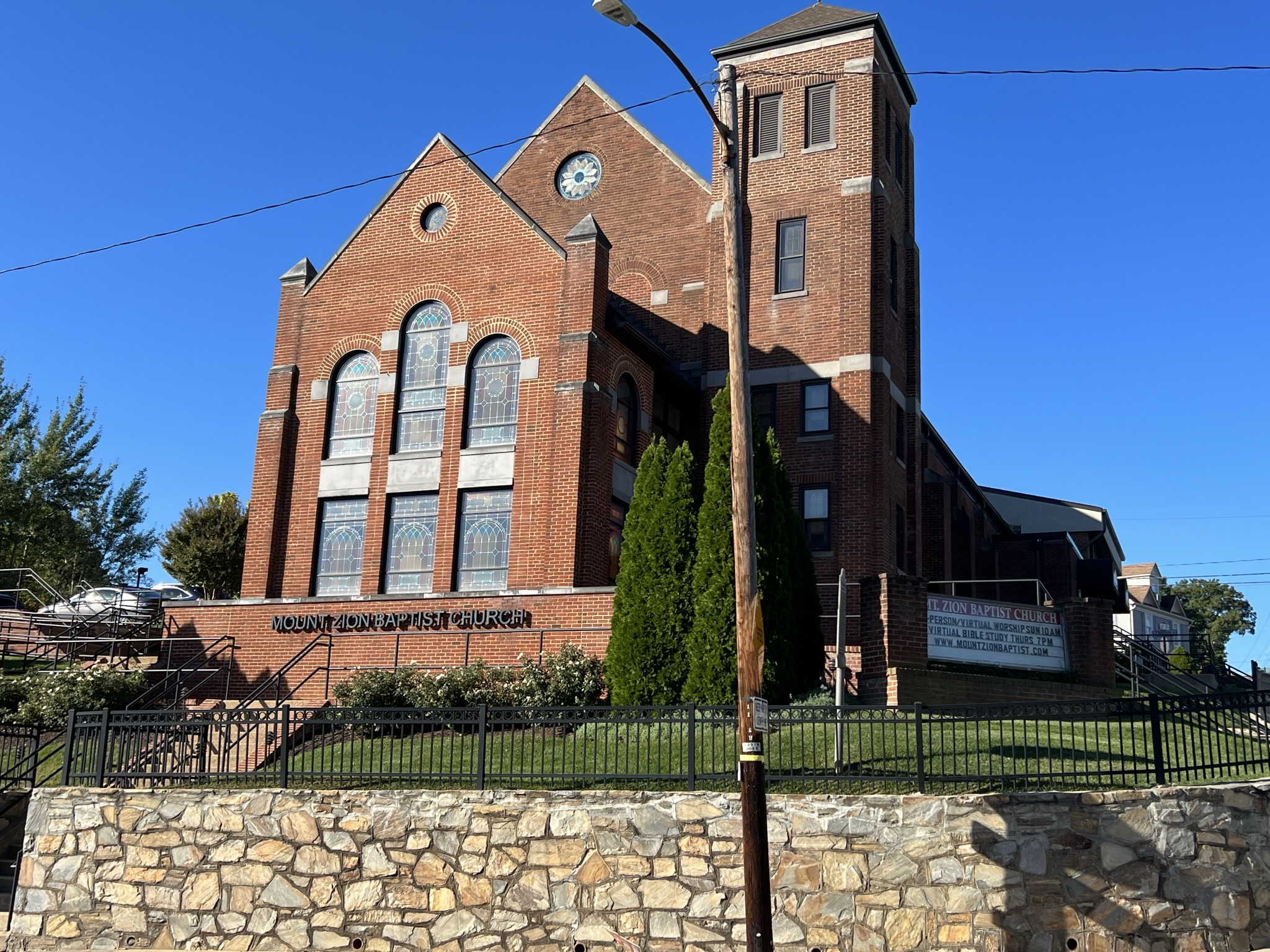
- Mount Zion Baptist Church
- 38°51′12.45″N 77°5′17.52″W
- Location: 3500 South 19th Street, Arlington, Virginia 22204
- Country: United States
- Denomination: Baptist
- Website: www.mountzionbaptist.com

History
- Former name: The Old Bell Church
- Founded: 1866
- Founder: Rev. Dr. Robert S. Laws

Architecture
- Functional status: Active
- Architect(s): Romulus Cornelius Archer, Jr. (1944); FormDesign (2012)
- Years built: 1944

Clergy
- Pastor: Dr. André D. Ivy

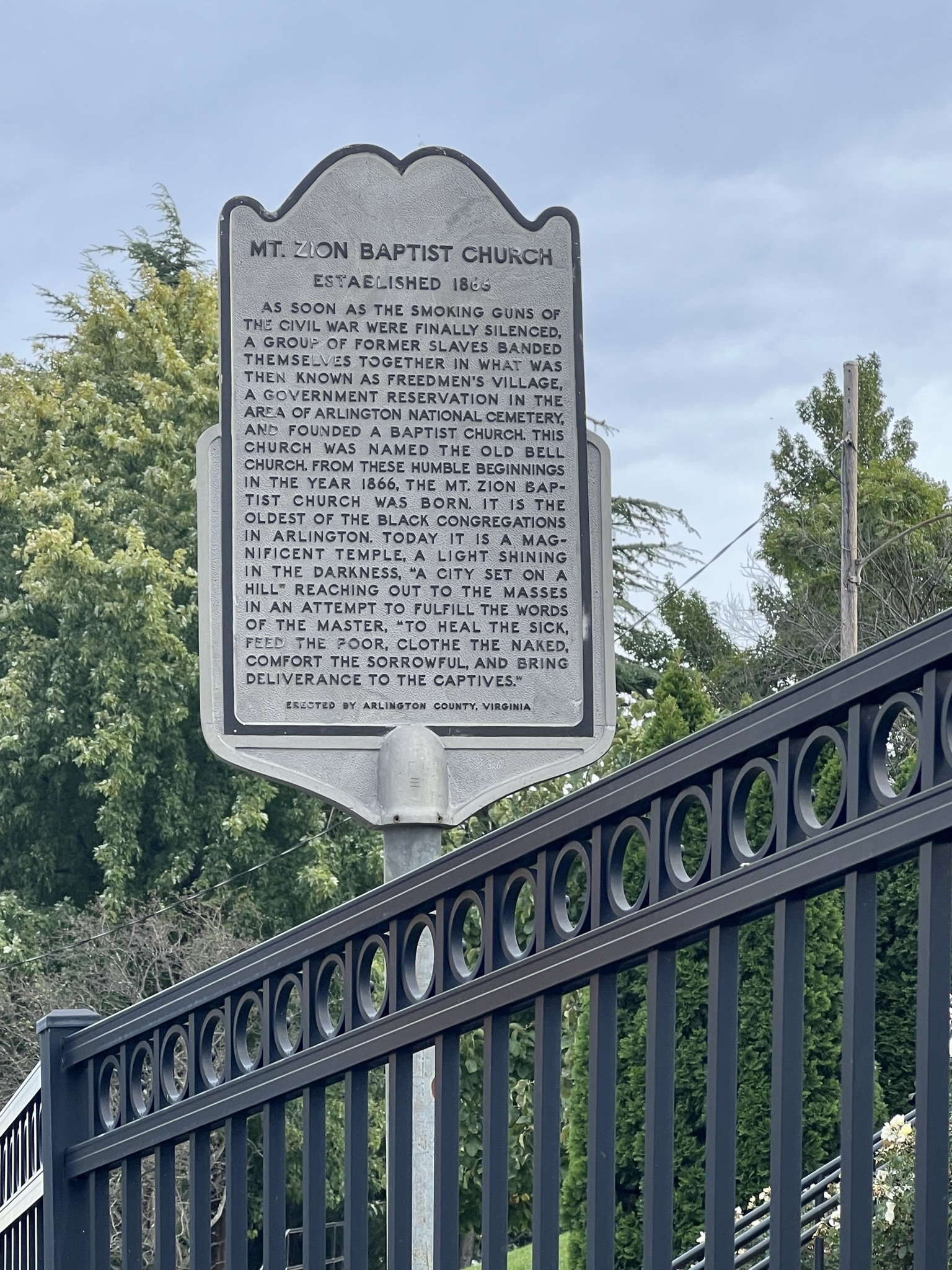
Mount Zion Baptist Church, Arlington County historical marker

Mount Zion Baptist Church, established in 1866, is the oldest African American church in Arlington, Virginia. The church is a member of the National Baptist Convention USA and the Progressive National Baptist Convention.

== The Old Bell Church, Freedman's Village ==
In 1865, the US Congress established Freedmen's Bureau to administer various camps to house formerly enslaved African Americans, including Freedman's Village, a site on General Robert E. Lee former estate in Arlington, Virginia. The village comprised approximately 50 story-and-a-half homes, divided in the middle to accommodate two families, an industrial school for education in various trades, a school for children and two places of worship. Harper's Weekly reported the village also included a hospital, a "home" for the aged, and other public buildings.

Two churches were founded in Freedman's Village in 1866: the Little Zion Methodist Church and the Old Bell Baptist Church. The Little Zion Methodist Church would later be renamed Lomax African Methodist Episcopal Zion Church. The membership of the Old Bell Church grew and the congregation split into two: Mount Zion Baptist Church and Mount Olive Baptist Church.

Mount Zion Baptist Church has worshiped in four permanent locations, surviving two forced relocations mandated by the federal government. The first location was in Freedman's Village, on the Lee Custis estate, land known today as Arlington National Cemetery. The federal government eventually closed Freedman's Village. In the mid-1880s, Mount Zion Baptist Church relocated and built a two-story brick building with a marble front on Mount Vernon Avenue (present day Arlington Ridge Road). In 1930, a new church was built on Arlington Ridge Road, which the federal government condemned in 1942 for land to build the Pentagon. The fourth and current location was on South 19th Street in Arlington. Architect Romulus C. Archer, Jr., the second African American architect to be licensed in Washington, D.C., designed the church building.

== Pastors ==
Mount Zion Baptist Church continues into the twenty-first century having been led by a series of senior pastors.

=== Rev. Dr. Robert Simon Laws ===
Robert Simon Laws was born ca. 1837 on Wood Farm Plantation in Middlesex County, Virginia as an enslaved person. At some point, Robert was sold to Richard H. Lynch of Washington County, Virginia who published a $100 reward in 1863 for the return of a runaway slave, 24-year-old Robert Laws, who was described as "5 feet 7 inches high and weighs about 175 pounds" and likely headed to Middlesex County, Virginia.

Laws eventually traveled and settled in Washington, DC. In 1866, he and Patsey A. Williams married in Washington, DC.

Laws was pastor of the Old Bell Church at Freedman's Village, subsequently called Mount Zion Baptist Church, from 1866 to 1875. In 1866, he received 90 persons into the church. In 1875 the Mount Zion Church building collapsed during repairs. Once new repairs were completed on the church, a new cornerstone was laid on Sunday, October 10, 1875, at a ceremony led by the abolitionist Rev. William Troy, of Richmond, Virginia and Rev. Laws.

From 1875 to 1891, Laws served as pastor of the Virginia Avenue Baptist (Colored) Church, later renamed Friendship Baptist Church in Washington, DC.

=== Rev. Joseph Matthews ===
Rev. Matthews was born in 1850 in Fredericksburg, Virginia. His wife was Lucretia Payne. He served as the second senior pastor for Mount Zion Baptist Church from 1875 – 1890. He presented his ministerial credential to the Alexandria (VA) court in 1884 and was granted license to perform marriage ceremonies. Rev. Matthews officiated the first church wedding at Mount Zion.

Rev. Matthews left Mount Zion in 1890 and pastored three additional local churches. He led Mount Salvation Baptist Church in Halls Hill starting in 1890. He also led Bethlehem Baptist Church in Anacostia, Washington DC from 1892 until his passing in 1919 and First Baptist Church of Vienna, Virginia from 1908 – 1918.

=== Rev. Edward R. Jackson ===
Rev. Edward Roland Jackson was born ca. 1858 in Yorktown, Virginia. His wife was Susie Franklin. In 1891, he graduated from the Howard University Theological Department. He was ordained into ministry by the Metropolitan Baptist Church in Washington, D.C. Rev. Jackson led Mount Zion Baptist Church from 1890 to 1903. During this time, he represented the church in meetings with other African American ministers in the Washington metropolitan area. In 1898, he also "filled the pulpit" at Zion Baptist Church in Lottsburg, Virginia.

=== Rev. Charles H. Fox ===
Rev. Charles Fox was born ca. 1872 in Virginia. His wife was Lucy Barber. He served as the fourth senior pastor for Mount Zion Baptist Church for six months in 1903. From 1918 to 1951, Rev. Fox was senior pastor of Mount Horeb Baptist Church in Washington, D.C.

=== Rev. Abraham G. Gordon ===
Rev. Abraham Garnett Gordon was born in 1862 in Orange County, Virginia. His wife was Mary Stewart. He served as the fifth pastor of Mount Zion Baptist Church from 1904 – 1906. His tenure was cut short from injuries sustained in a "trolley car accident below [Arlington's] Clark Street Station." Rev. Gordon returned to Gordonsville, Virginia in Orange County and made brooms, which were noted for "being of superior quality and make." Rev. Gordon eventually employed six persons. Later he was senior pastor of Beulah Baptist Church in Rixeyville, Virginia from 1925 until he passed in 1927.

=== Rev. Frank W. Graham ===
Rev. Frank Wood Graham was born ca. 1868 in Alcorn, Mississippi. His wife was Edna Witherspoon. Rev. Graham was the sixth pastor and led Mount Zion Baptist Church from 1908 to 1914. While serving as pastor, Rev. Graham was also a clerk at the US Department of the Treasury and took in boarders, including Julia T. Hammonds, who received a US patent for an apparatus for holding yarn skeins. Rev. Graham died in 1914 while pastor at Mount Zion Baptist Church.

=== Rev. James Edgar Green ===
Rev. James Edgar Green was born in 1878 in Carolina County, Virginia. His wife was Eliza Owens Green. The couple had eight children James Jr., William, Jesse, Christina, Charles, Richard, Alfred and David. Rev. Green came to the Arlington area about 1900 and worked for a building contractor. He also joined Mount Zion Baptist Church in 1903 and held various roles such as Sunday School superintendent, choir member and deacon. Rev. Green was called to ministry and served as the seventh senior pastor of Mount Zion Baptist Church from 1914 until he passed in 1950. Rev. Green oversaw major church building renovations, which concluded in 1945.

=== Rev. Dr. Oswald Garrett Smith ===
Rev. Dr. Oswald Garrett Smith was born in 1925 in Richmond, Virginia, to Rev. Ernest Clarence Smith, former pastor of Metropolitan Baptist Church in Washington, D.C. (1928–1977), and Mamie O. Davis. In 1947, Rev. Smith married Berta Elizabeth Mills, and together they had two children, Oswald Jr. and Alicia. Rev. Smith pursued higher education at West Virginia State College, Howard University School of Religion, Union Theological Seminary, and Columbia University. In 1948, he was elected assistant pastor of Metropolitan Baptist Church. He later became the eighth senior pastor of Mount Zion Baptist Church, serving from 1952 to 1990.

Other Mount Zion Baptist Church pastors have included:

- Dr. Leonard N. Smith served from 1991 – 2021
- Interim pastor Elder Donald Hayes served from 2022 to 2024
- Dr. André D. Ivy, Senior Pastor 2025 to present

== Arlington Historical Landmark marker ==
Mount Zion Baptist Church was designated a historic landmark in 1986, with a marker placed on the property on 17 September 1986 by the Arlington Historical Landmark Review Board. The marker noted the church's founding in Freedman's Village and status as the oldest African American congregation in Arlington, Virginia.

== Gallery ==
Mount Zion Baptist Church photos
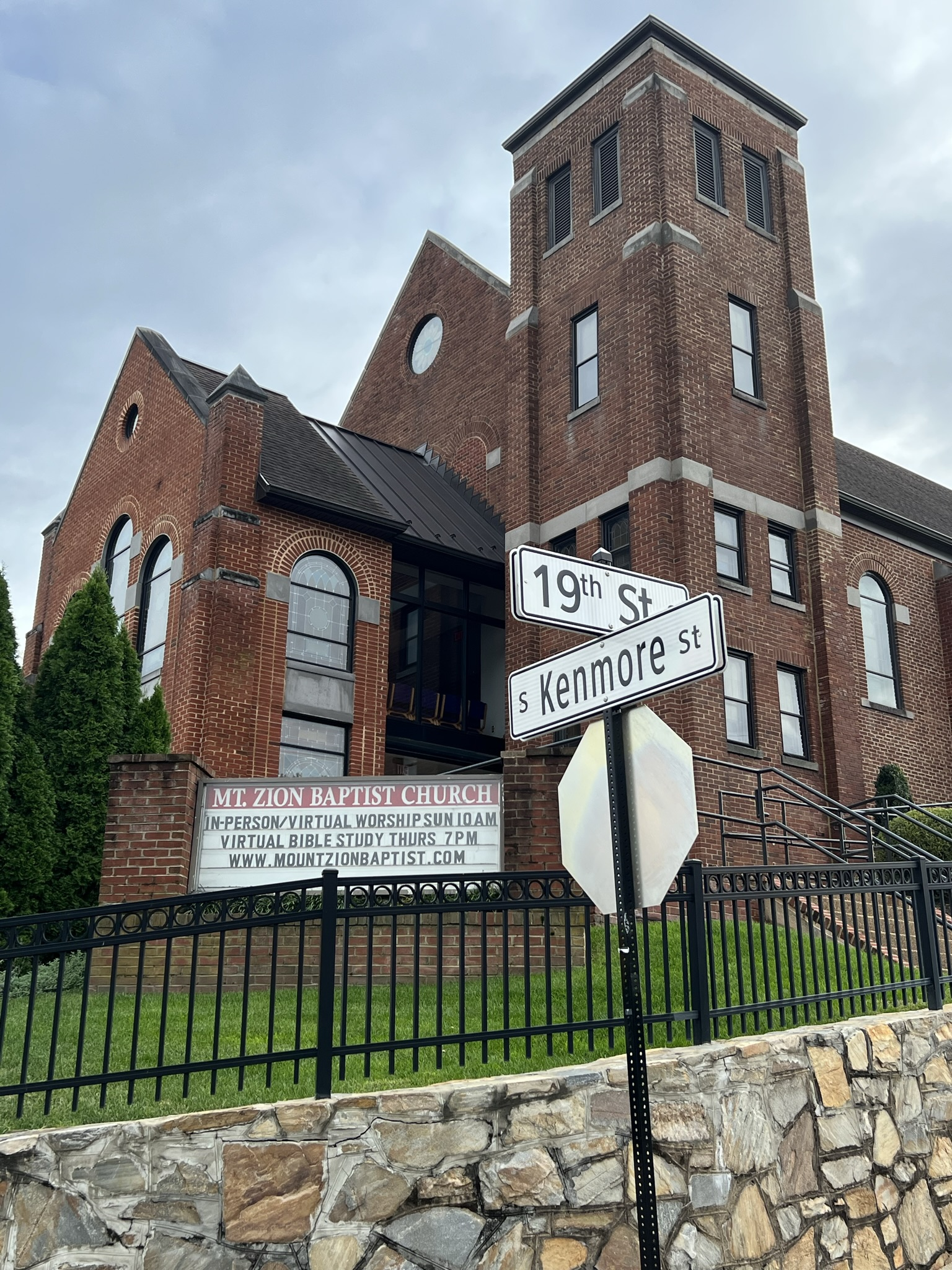

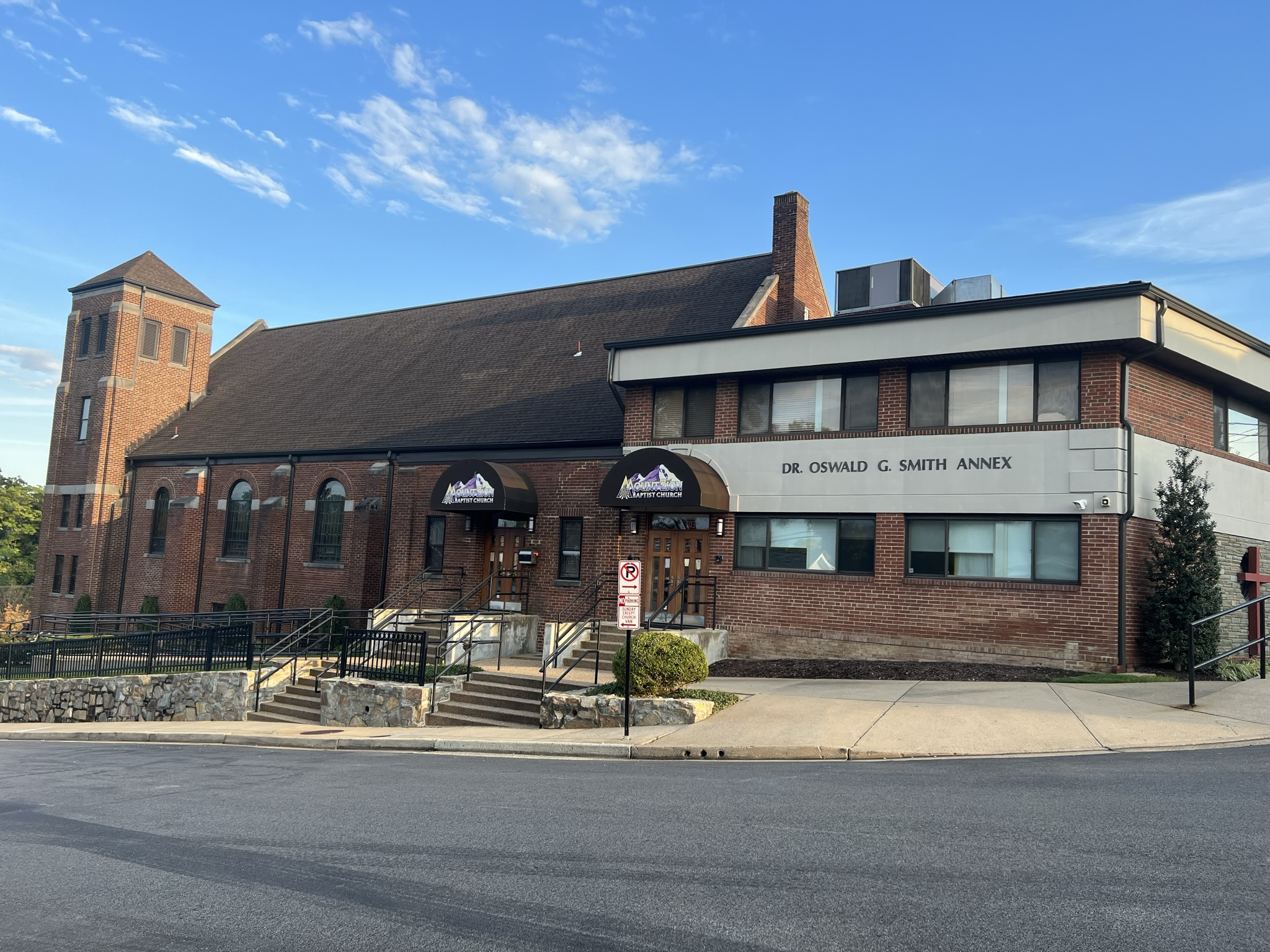

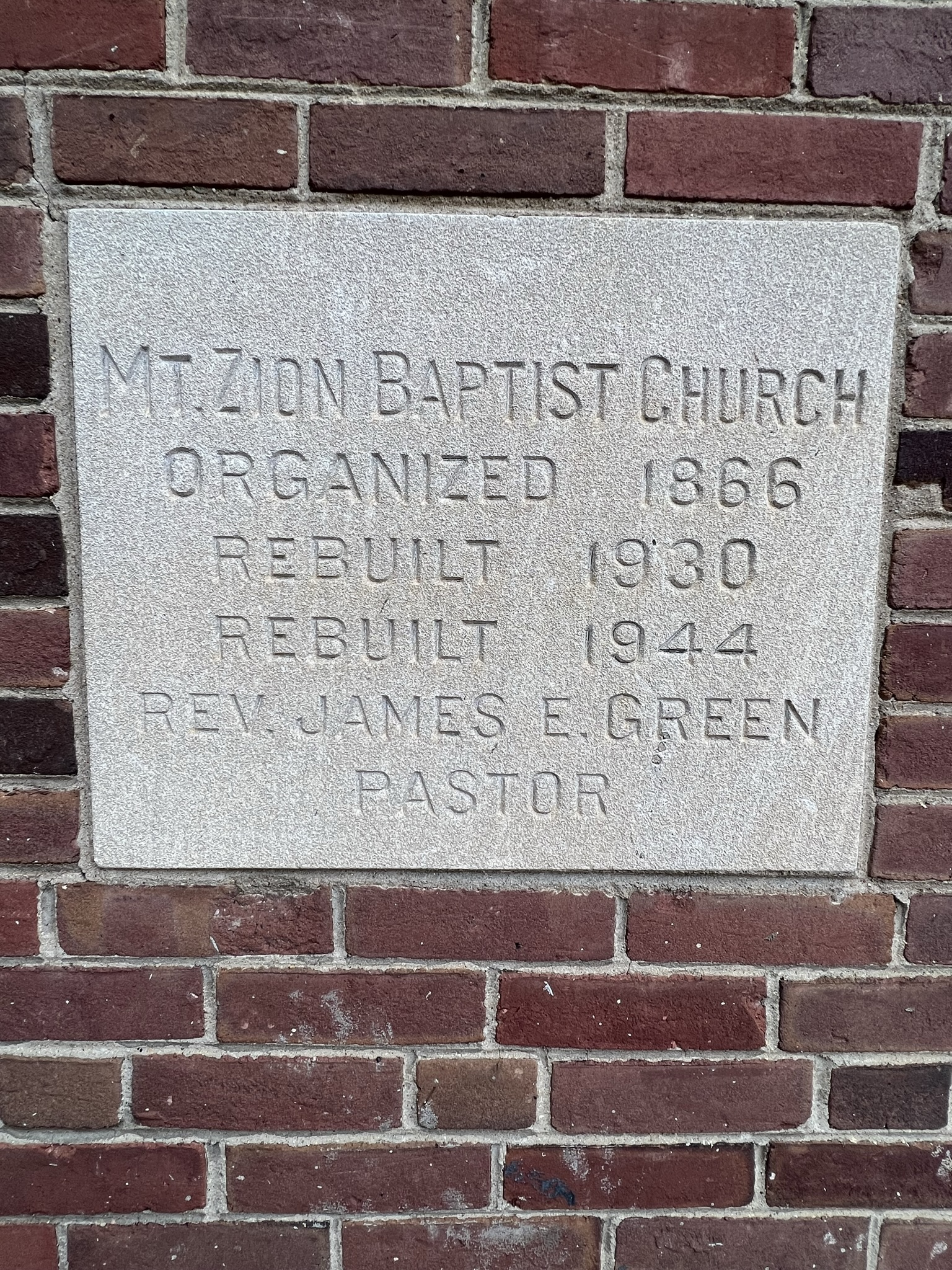

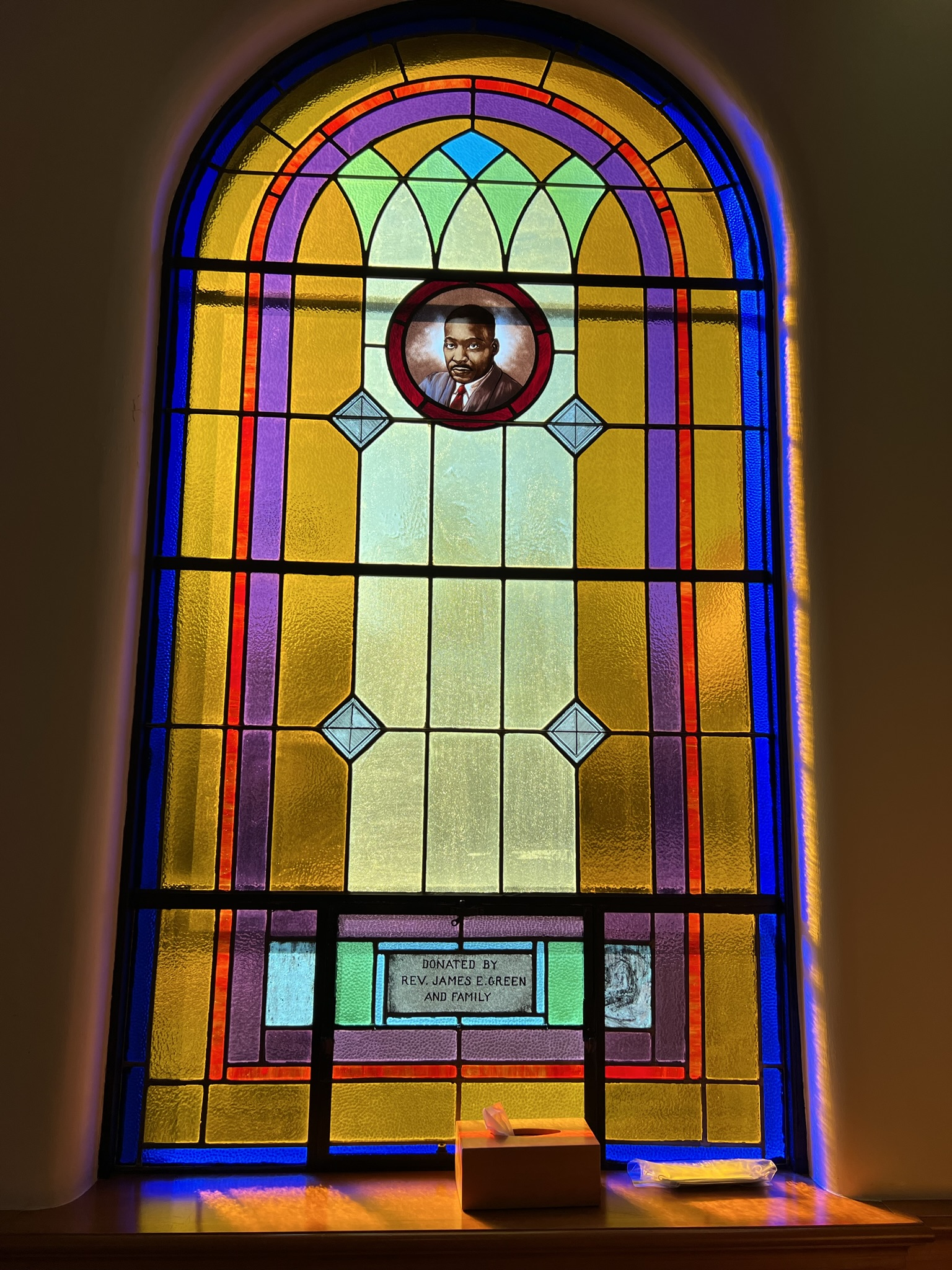

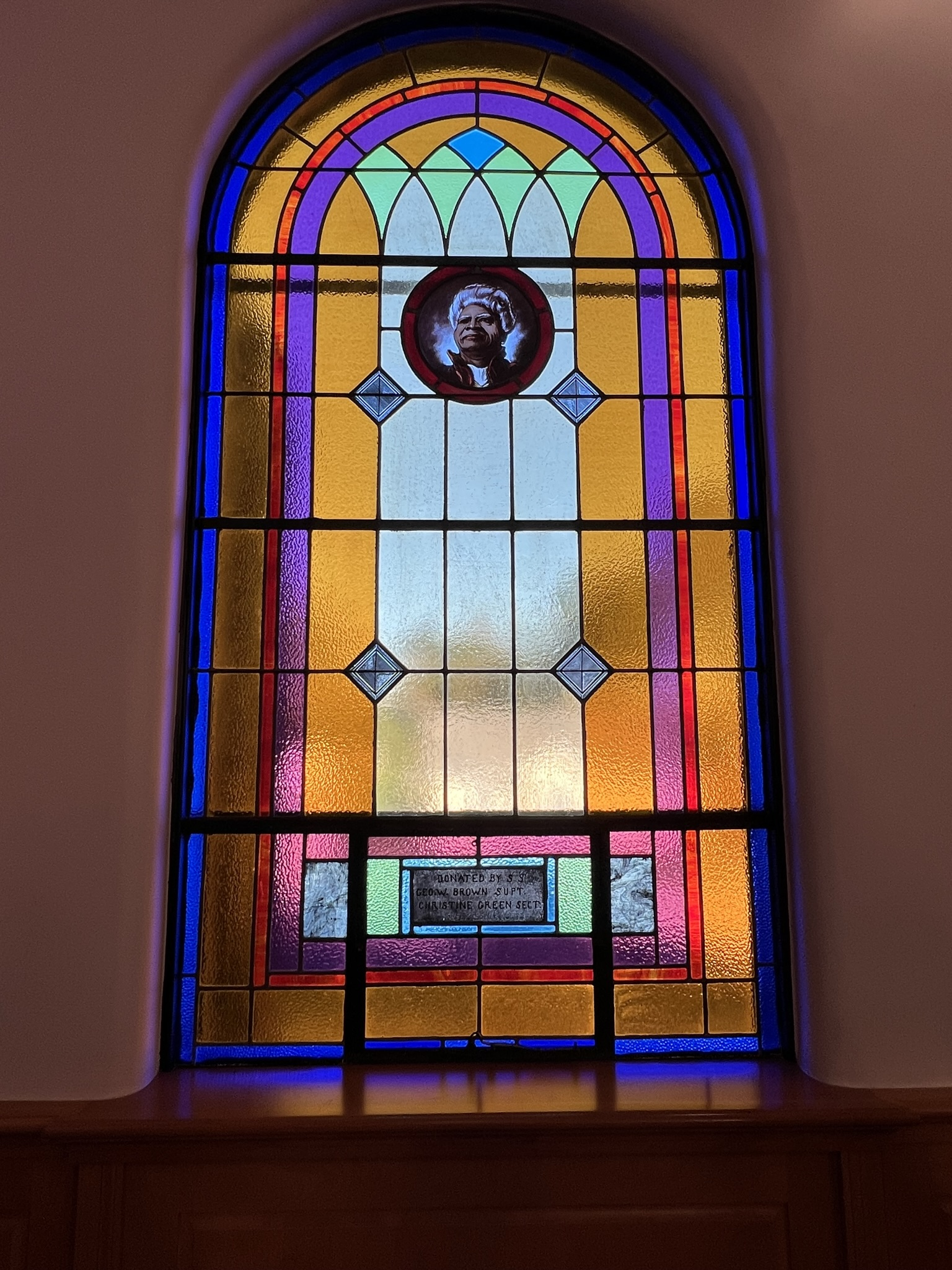

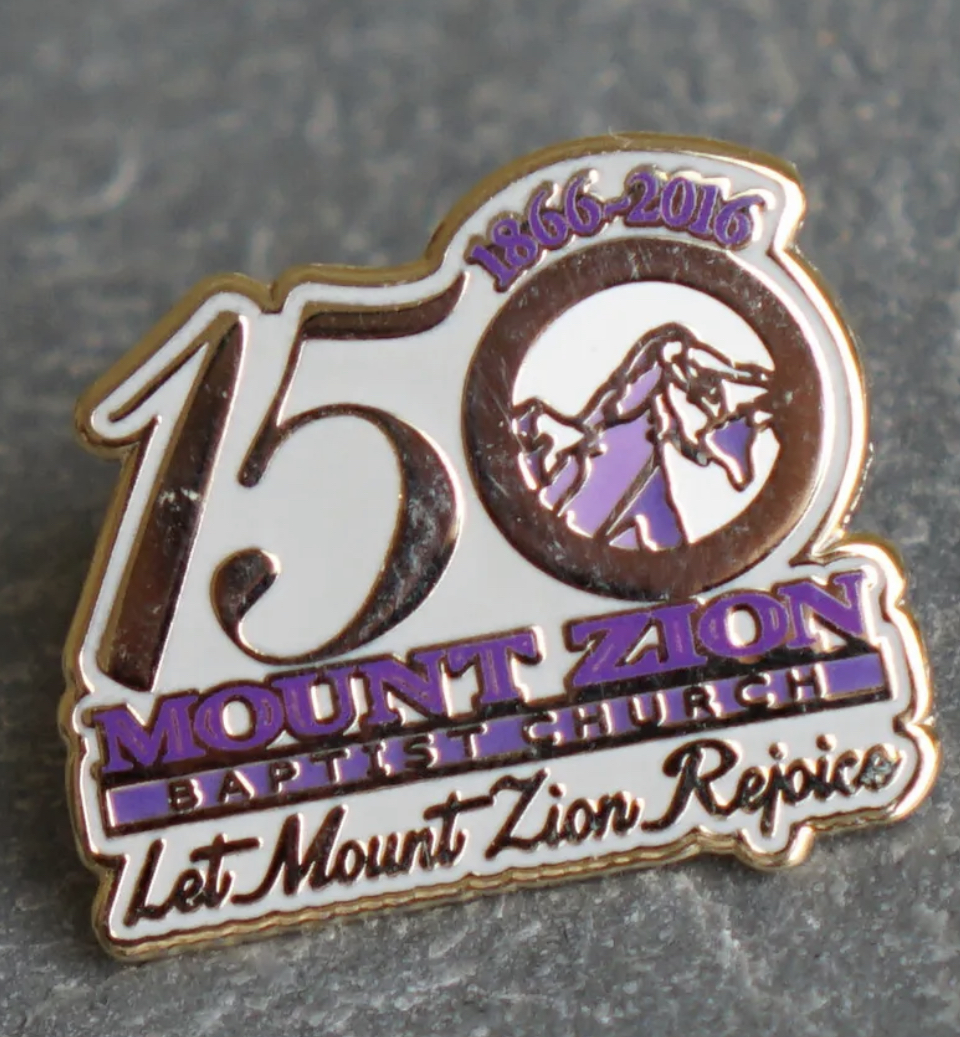

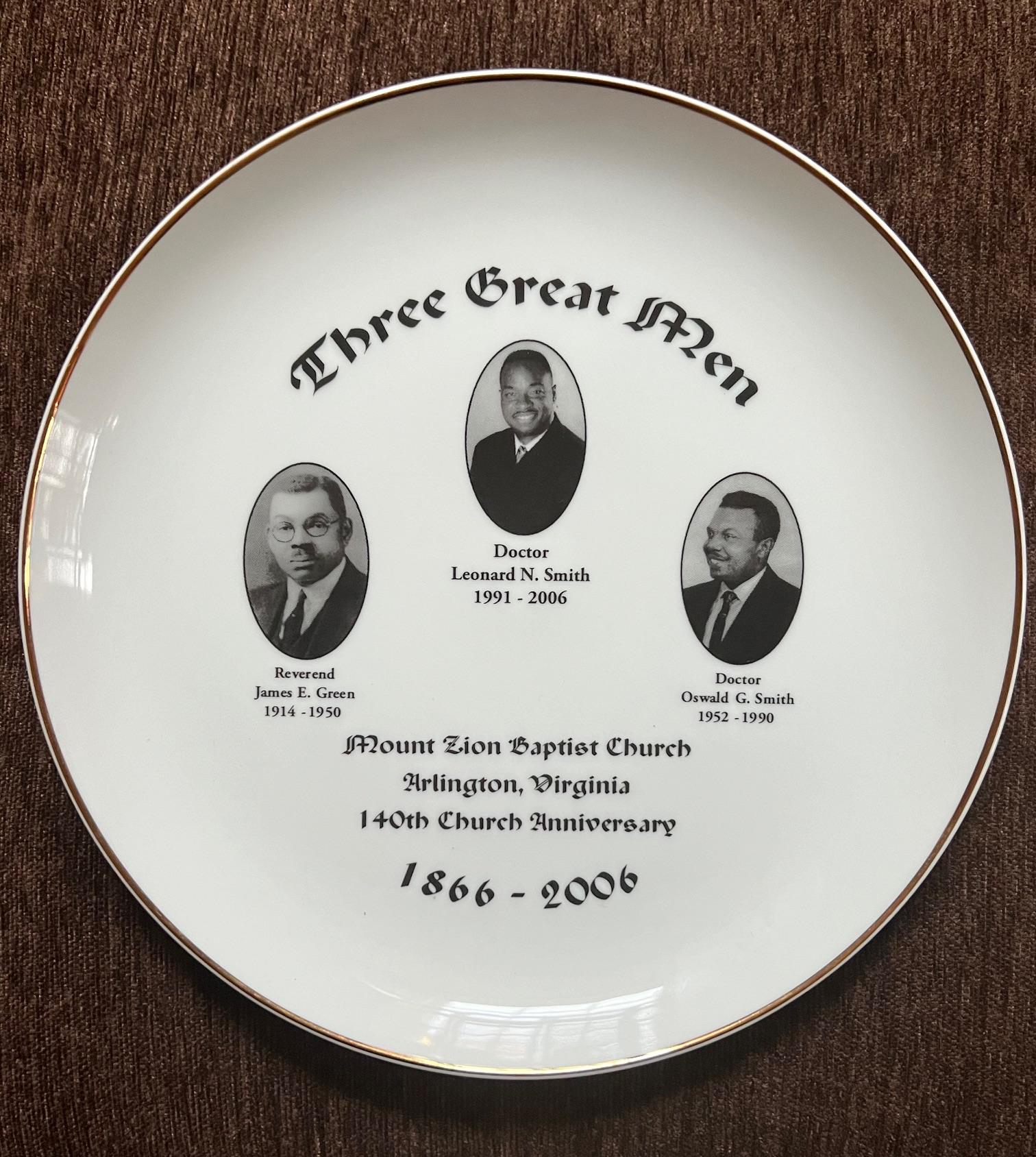

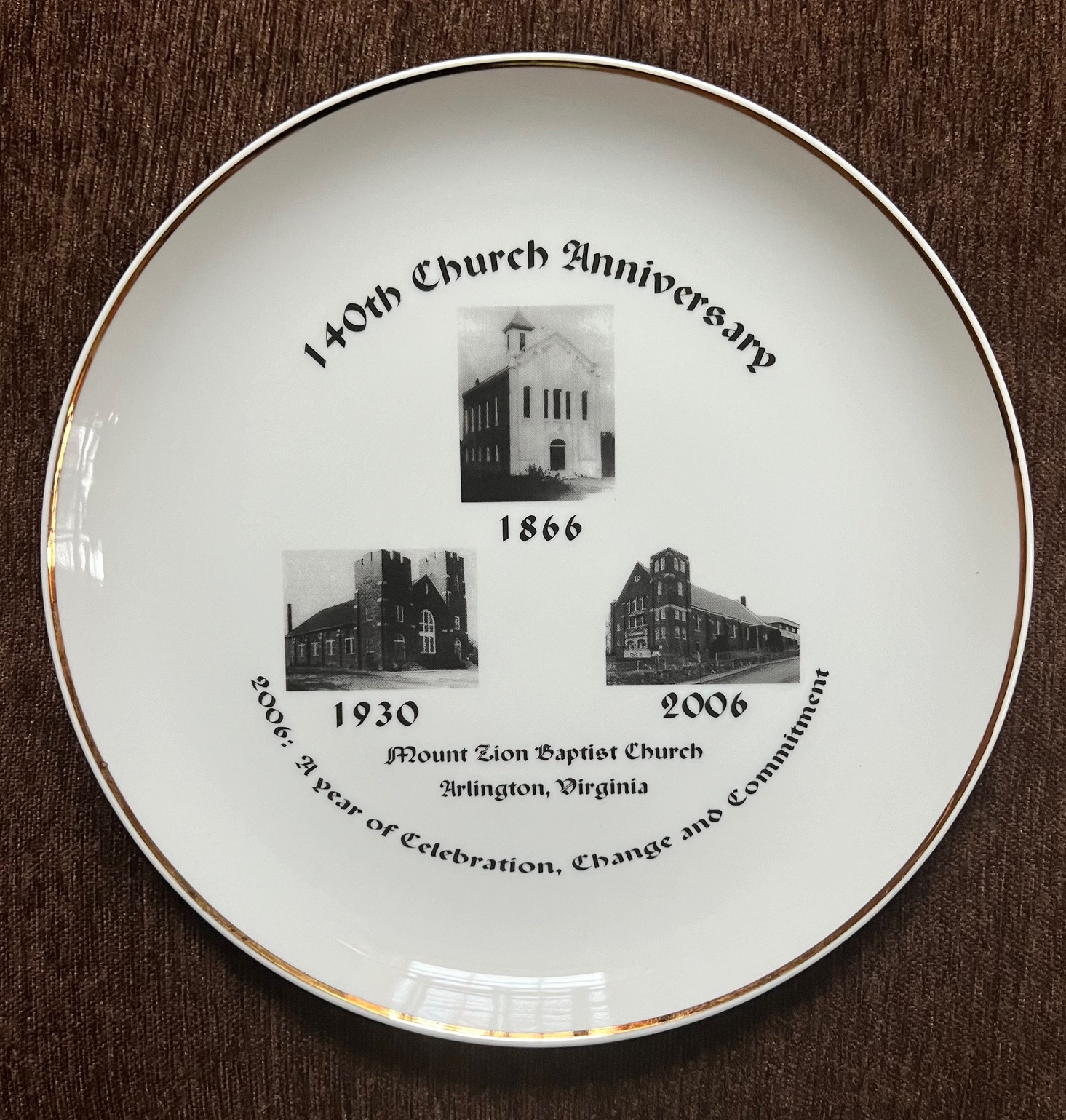

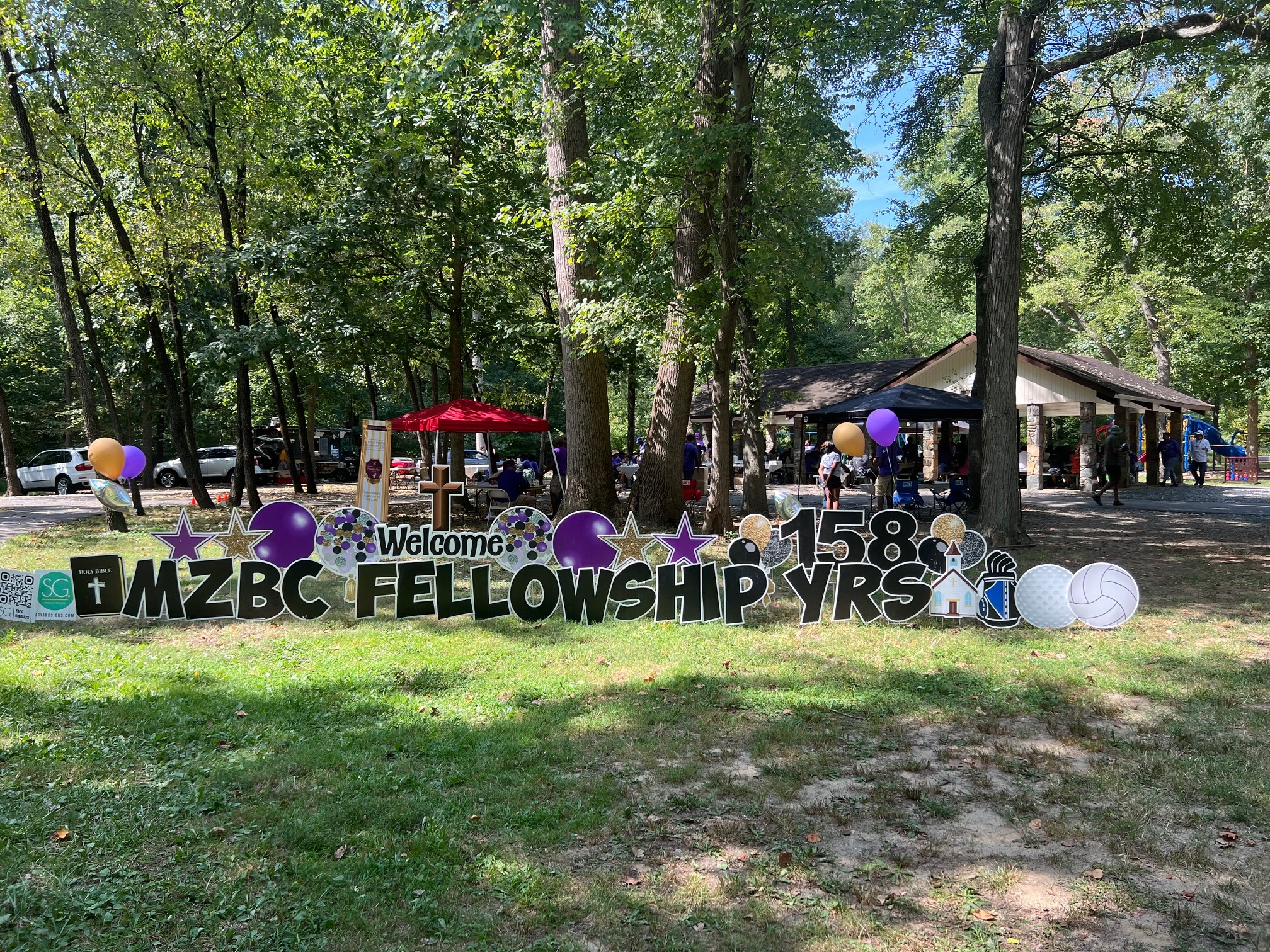

== Legacy and commemoration ==
Grave marker of Rev Robert S. Laws at Homewood Cemetery, Pittsburgh, 2026.

Through the Years, a play written and directed by Louise L. Gray, dramatized the history of Mount Zion Baptist Church, from its founding in Freedman's Village through major milestones. The play was first performed as a church centennial pageant in 1966 and then updated and performed in 1986 and 1993.

Church member Mrs. Ruby Jones was crowned "Miss Ebony" in 1962 for raising more than $2,000 at Mount Zion Baptist Church in an Ebony Magazine subscription campaign.

In 2026, as part of its 160th anniversary commemoration, Mount Zion Baptist Church arranged for a grave marker to be placed at the previously unmarked grave of its first pastor, Robert S. Laws, at Homewood Cemetery in Pittsburgh. Members of the congregation traveled to Pittsburgh for a recommittal and dedication ceremony on July 10, 2026, 123 years after Laws's death. The City of Pittsburgh issued a proclamation recognizing July 10, 2026, as “Rev. Robert Simon Laws Day.”

== See also ==
- Baptists in the United States
