= Stephen Glickman =

Stephen Glickman may refer to:

- Stephen H. Glickman (born 1948), American judge
- Stephen Kramer Glickman (born 1979), Canadian actor, music producer and comedian
