= Hubert Pair =

American judge

Hubert B. Pair

Senior Judge of the District of Columbia Court of Appeals
- In office 1975–1988

Associate Judge of the District of Columbia Court of Appeals
- In office 1971–1974
- Nominated by: Richard Nixon
- Succeeded by: Julia Cooper Mack

Personal details
- Born: April 14, 1904 Raleigh, North Carolina
- Died: June 14, 1988 (aged 84) Washington, D.C.
- Spouse: Macleta Brown Pair
- Education: Howard University; Terrell Law School (LL.B.)

Hubert B. Pair (April 14, 1904 – June 14, 1988) was a judge of the District of Columbia Court of Appeals, the highest court for the District of Columbia.

Born in Raleigh, North Carolina, Pair moved to Washington, D.C. as a child, where his father Rev. James Pair served as pastor of First Baptist Church in Brentwood. Pair graduated from Howard University and earned his law degree from Terrell Law School, both black institutions in segregated Washington. While attending school at night, he worked as a messenger and skilled laborer at the Bureau of Customs. He taught night classes at Terrell until the school closed in 1951.

In 1942, Pair was hired by the corporation counsel's office, becoming the first black lawyer ever to work in the office. He spent 28 years at the corporation counsel's office, served as chief of the appellate staff and acting corporation counsel, and was well-regarded by his colleagues such as future federal judge Oliver Gasch. Corporation Counsel Charles Duncan described him as "a very proper and old school lawyer." During his time at the corporation counsel's office, Pair argued a case on behalf of the District before the Supreme Court, though the Court did not decide the case and instead dismissed the writ as improvidently granted.

In 1970, at age 66, Pair was nominated for a new seat on the D.C. Court of Appeals by President Nixon. His nomination was part of a group that included six black judicial nominees, which according to Jet magazine was the largest number of African-Americans ever nominated to the bench at one time. The other nominees included his future colleague Theodore R. Newman, Jr., who was nominated to the Superior Court of the District of Columbia. Pair was confirmed by the Senate on May 26, 1971, and served until 1974, when he reached the mandatory retirement age of 70 and assumed senior status.

Pair was a member of Phi Beta Sigma Fraternity, Incorporated, the National Association for the Advancement of Colored People, the Pigskin Club, and the Metropolitan Baptist Church of Washington, where he served as trustee and taught a men's Bible class.

== Sources ==
- Hearing Before the Committee on the District of Columbia, U.S. Senate, 91st Congress, Second Session, on Judicial Nominations for District of Columbia Courts, October 12, 1970.
