= Robert S. Laws =

American Baptist pastor

- Born: Robert S. Laws c. 1837; Middlesex County, Virginia, U.S.
- Died: May 16, 1903 (aged 65–66); Pittsburgh, Pennsylvania, U.S.
- Education: Wayland Theological Seminary; Howard University
- Occupation: Pastor
- Spouse: Patsey Williams Laws (m. 1866)

Rev. Dr. Robert Simon Laws, a formerly enslaved person and Howard University graduate, founded two African American Baptist churches in the 19th century that have active congregations in the 21st century.

== Early life ==
Laws was born on Wood Farm Plantation in Middlesex County, Virginia. Laws was enslaved by Sarah "Sally" Roane, the daughter of William Roane and Sarah Daniel. She left her farm and slaves, including Robert, to her niece Polly Roane Segar, according to her 1826 will. At some point, Laws was sold to Richard H. Lynch of Washington County, Virginia, who published a $100 (~$2,615 in 2025) reward in 1863 for the return of a runaway slave, 24-year-old Robert Laws, who was described as "5 feet 7 inches high and weighs about 175 pounds" and likely headed to Middlesex County, Virginia.

Laws eventually traveled and settled in Washington, D.C. In 1866, he married Patsey A. Williams in Washington, D.C.

== Freedman's Village ==
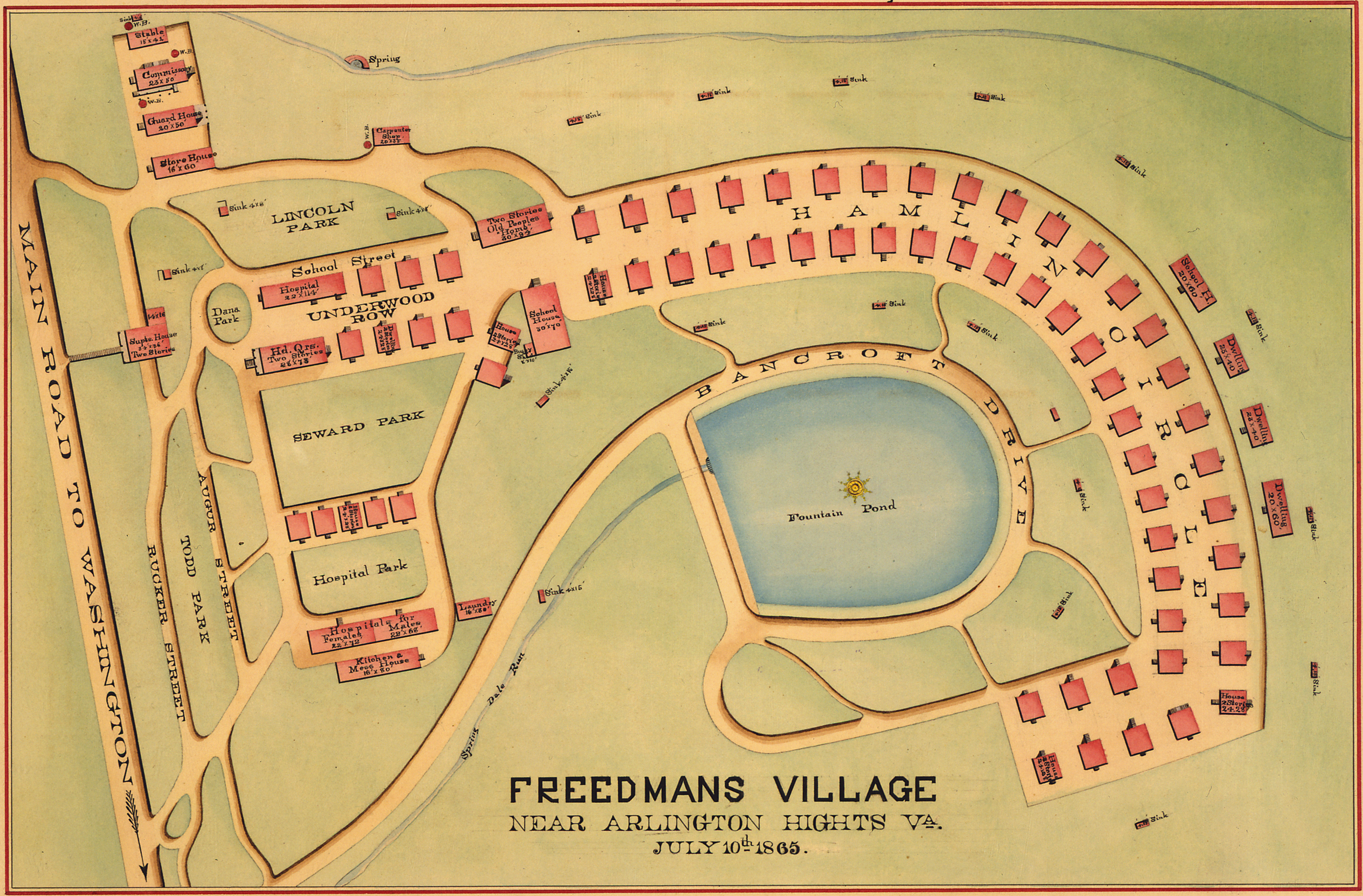
A July 1865 plan for Freedman's Village near Arlington Heights Historic District

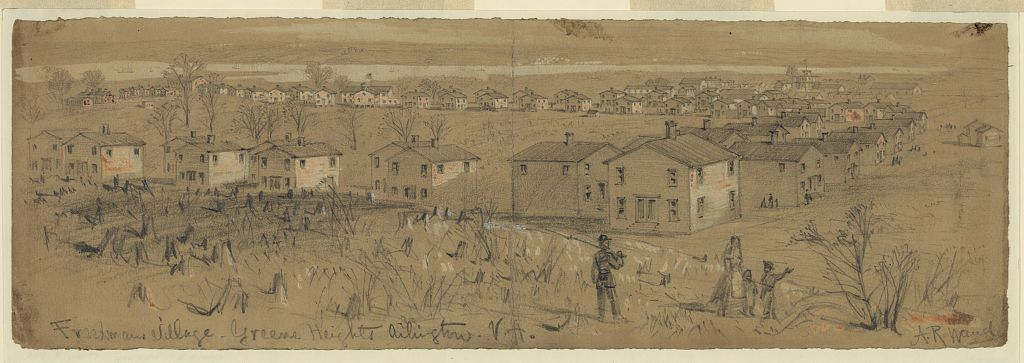
Freedman's Village-Greene Heights in Arlington County, Virginia

In 1865, the U.S. Congress established Freedmen's Bureau to administer various camps to house formerly enslaved African Americans, including Freedman's Village, a site on General Robert E. Lee former estate in Arlington County, Virginia.

The village comprised approximately 50 story-and-a-half homes, divided in the middle to accommodate two families, an industrial school for education in various trades, a school for children and two places of worship. Harper's Weekly reported the village also included a hospital, a "home" for the aged, and other public buildings. Abolitionist and women's rights activist Sojourner Truth served as a counselor at the village for over a year.

Laws held various positions at Freedman's Village, including employment agent, teacher and pastor. According to an 1870 report to Congress, "...Robert S. Laws, a scholar in the Wayland Theological Seminary and who preaches at Arlington, has the supervision of this Freedman's Village school, which averages about 100 scholars." Patsey Laws, his wife, was hired as a nurse for Abbott Hospital in Freedman's Village.

Two churches were founded in Freedman's Village in 1866: the Little Zion Methodist Church and Mount Zion Baptist Church. The membership of the Old Bell Church grew and the congregation split into two: Mount Zion Baptist Church and Mount Olive Baptist Church.

Laws was pastor of the Old Bell Church and Mount Zion Baptist Church from 1866 to 1875. In 1866, he received 90 persons into the church.

In 1872, Laws filled the position of Justice of the Peace in Jefferson Township in Alexandria County, Virginia. However, he was removed from the office in January 1873.

In 1875, the Mount Zion Church building collapsed during repairs. Once new repairs were completed on the church, a new cornerstone was laid on October 10, 1875 at a ceremony led by the abolitionist, Rev. William Troy, of Richmond, Virginia, and Rev. Laws.

Mount Zion Baptist Church hosted a four-night revival meeting celebrating its 135th anniversary. Congregations that grew out of the Old Bell Church were also invited, according to an August 16, 2001 articles in The Washington Post.

== Virginia Avenue Baptist Church ==
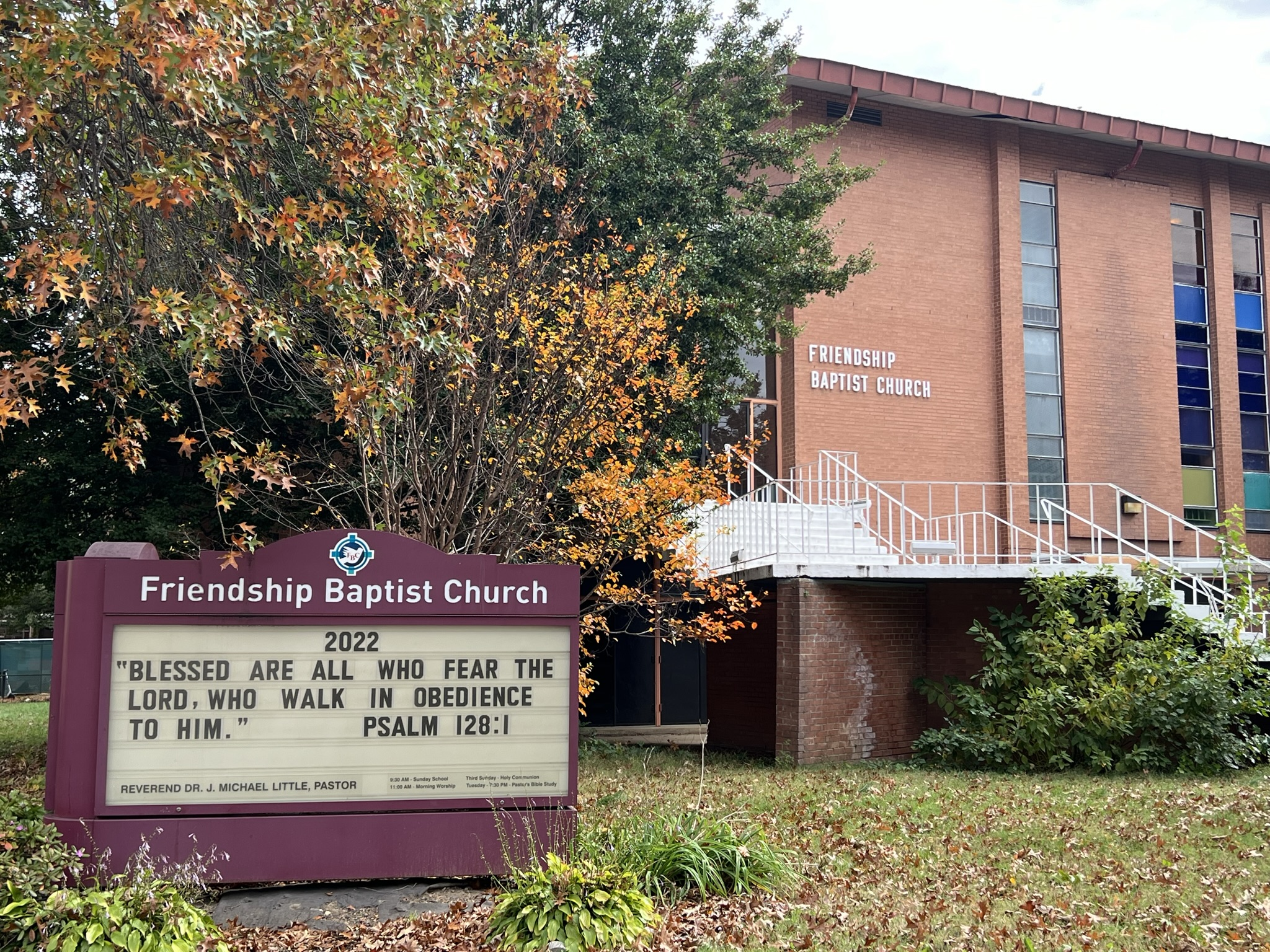
Friendship Baptist Church in Washington D.C. in 2022; the church was founded 1875 as Virginia Avenue Baptist Church

Laws graduated from the Preparatory Department at Howard University in 1875.

From 1875-1891, Laws served as pastor of the Virginia Avenue Baptist (Colored) Church, later renamed Friendship Baptist Church.

In 1883, Laws also worked for the Washington Bee newspaper in Washington, D.C., where he managed one of its offices covering the southeast and southwest sections of the city. Laws was also appointed to a committee for the Freedman's Savings Bank. By 1886, Laws was a "news editor" at the Washington Bee.

In April 1883, Laws was one of four speakers at the 21st anniversary emancipation celebration in Washington, D.C. He reviewed the emancipation parade with the honored guest and speaker Frederick Douglass as well as with Col. Milton M. Holland and Mr. W. Calvin Chase.

According to the 1900 census, Robert and Patsey Laws had one child, who was then no longer living. A newborn named Robert Laws died November 1884 and was buried in Payne's Cemetery.

== Mount Olive Baptist Church ==
Laws was associated with Mount Olive Baptist Church in Pittsburgh, Pennsylvania since at least August 1901, but was not officially named pastor until November 1901. In June 1902, Laws led about 100 persons in a baptism service at a local river.

On September 15, 1902, a delegation of African American Baptist pastors left Pittsburgh to attend the National Baptist Convention in Birmingham, Alabama. Between 5,000 and 7,000 delegates from across the country were expected.

On September 20, educators Booker T. Washington of Tuskegee Institute, William Hooper Council, founder of Alabama A&M from Normal, Alabama, and Richard Robert Wright, Sr. of Savannah, Georgia, were scheduled to speak at Shiloh Baptist Church, the largest African American church in Birmingham. There was a physical dispute between two individuals after Booker T. Washington's speech. Someone shouted "fight" and the crowd of nearly 2,000 in the church interpreted this as "fire" and scrambled to leave the building. The stampede within Shiloh Baptist Church killed 115 convention attendees.

The Pittsburgh delegation of Black pastors sustained no injuries, though it took two days to confirm that Rev. Robert S. Laws was unharmed.

== Death and commemoration ==
Grave marker of Robert S. Laws at Homewood Cemetery, Pittsburgh.

Robert and Patsey Laws resided at 708 19th Street, NE in Washington, D.C. for several years, including in 1901 and 1902, according to Washington, D.C. city directories. Patsey Laws did not move to Pittsburgh, and washed clothes to earn money.

Laws contracted pneumonia and died in Pittsburgh on May 16, 1903. He was buried at Homewood Cemetery in Pittsburgh.

Mount Zion Baptist Church in Arlington, Virginia, arranged for a permanent marker to be placed at Laws's previously unmarked grave at Homewood Cemetery in Pittsburgh. A recommittal and dedication ceremony was held on July 10, 2026, 123 years after his death. The City of Pittsburgh issued a proclamation recognizing July 10, 2026, as “Rev. Robert Simon Laws Day.”
