= William Troy (abolitionist) =

The Reverend William Troy
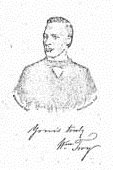

Personal details
- Born: 10 March 1827 Essex County, Virginia
- Died: 17 November 1905 (aged 78) Camden, New Jersey

The Reverend William Troy (10 March 1827 - 17 November 1905) was a Baptist minister and writer associated with the Underground Railroad.

== Life ==
Troy was born on 10 March 1827 in Essex County, Virginia. His mother was a free black woman and she married, then bought and set free, her husband.

Troy became a confirmed Christian at the age of 13, although he was discriminated against in church because he was an African American. He was baptized into the Baptist church, but he was surprised to hear that the deacons and the church pastor were giving sermons to justify their own personal trade in slaves. The pastor would sell members of his own congregation. Troy and his wife left Virginia in disgust in March 1848, and moved to Cincinnati.

In his new home, Reverend Troy was said to be the only "slave preacher" who was qualified to preach when he started. He was first a pastor at a church in Amherstburg in southern Canada, before settling in nearby Windsor, Ontario. In 1853 he held prayer meetings that led to the laying of a foundation stone for a church in Windsor in 1858. Troy founded the "First Baptist Church" in Windsor although the first local Baptist church had been established a few years before.

Troy published a book of stories taken from the lives of slaves who had escaped from the United States to Canada. His book has been cited by historians as counter-evidence to the idea that slaves escaped and were smuggled across America by white activists. Troy gives examples of slaves who escaped north without the aid of the Underground Railroad. He described how John Hedgeman was helped to freedom by black slaves and free people, who risked arrest for assisting those escaping north to Canada.

Troy traveled to Britain to raise funds for his church, where he gave lectures to anti-slavery societies. He traveled with William M. Mitchell, and was mentioned in the latter's book. Troy also traveled throughout Europe, Jamaica and Haiti.

In 1866 Troy relocated to Richmond, Virginia, where he spent nine months preaching and giving lectures. In 1867 he accepted a call to become the pastor of Richmond's Second Baptist Church. He resigned his pastorate in 1874 to found the Moore Street Industrial and Mission School and the Moore Street Baptist Church. On Sunday, October 10, 1875 Rev. Troy assisted Rev. Robert S. Laws in laying the cornerstone of Mount Zion Baptist Church (Arlington, Virginia), a church founded in Freedman's Village. In 1880 Troy was again called to be pastor of the Second Baptist Church, which calling he later resigned to found the Sharon Baptist Church.

== Family ==
William Troy was married to Sidney Blackburn on 18 October 1847 in Essex County, Virginia. When William died he was survived by Sidney and six children; Mrs. Annie Walker of Camden, New Jersey, Mrs. Fannie E. Oliver of Richmond, Virginia, Dr. William Troy of Franklin, Virginia, Joshua W. Troy, Mrs. Nannie Walker and one other son, of Newport News, Virginia. At the end of his life Troy resided with his daughter Annie in Camden. He suffered from paralysis and Bright's disease which led to his death on 17 November 1905 in Camden, New Jersey.

== Works ==
- Hair-breadth Escapes from Slavery to Freedom, 1861
