= William M. Mitchell =

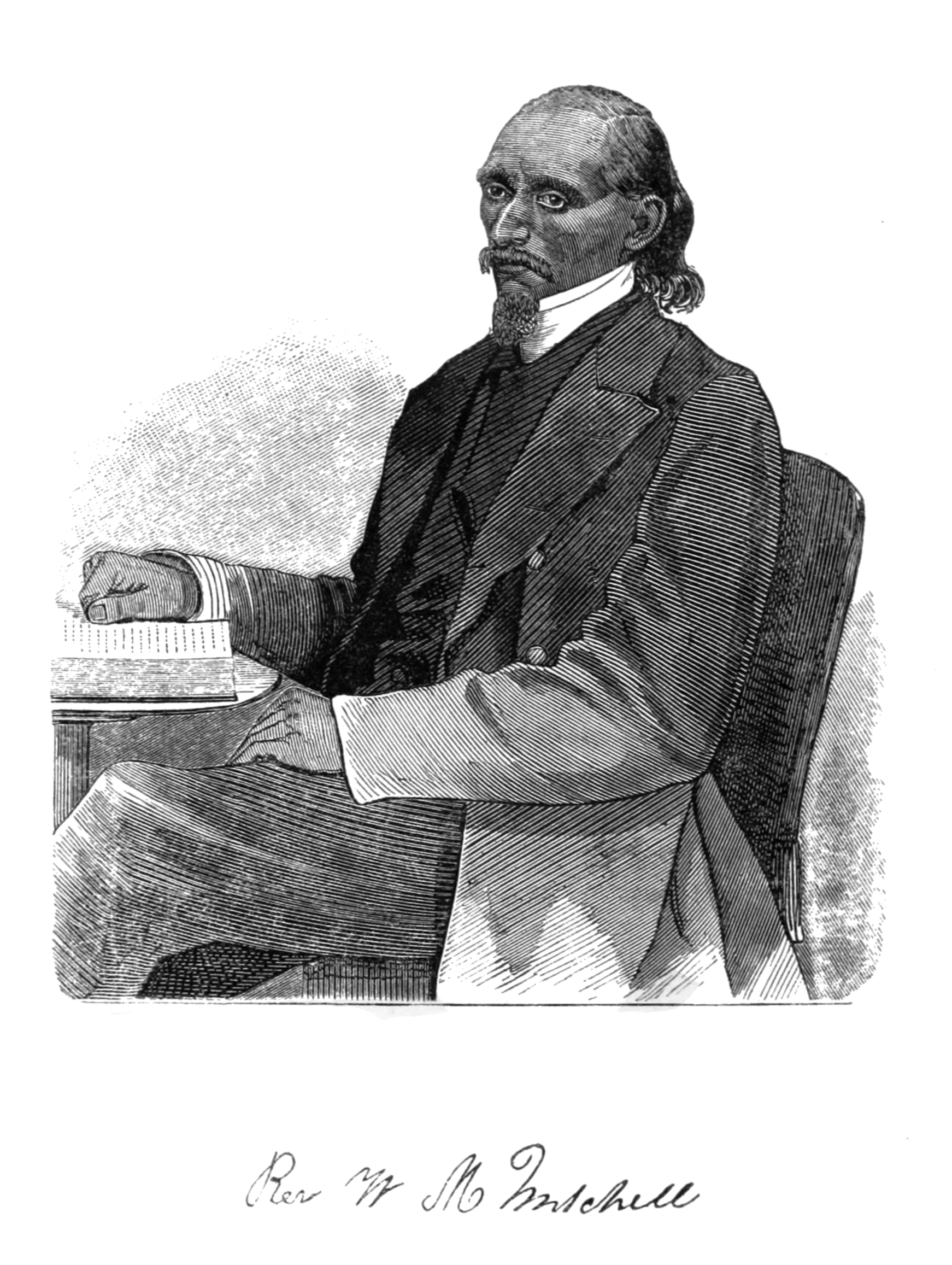
The Rev. W. M. Mitchell as he appeared in the frontispiece to his book, The Under-Ground Railroad

William M. Mitchell (c. 1826 – c. 1879) was an American writer, minister and abolitionist who worked on the Underground Railroad. He is said to be the only writer who wrote about the railroad while it was still illegal.

== Early life and career ==
Mitchell was raised as an orphan in North Carolina. His birth date is about 1826.

He was apprenticed to a plantation owner where he was obliged to help in administering their slaves.

He became involved in the resistance to slavery in 1843 when he was among a crowd of people who intimidated some bounty hunters who were returning an escaped slave to his owners. The man regained his freedom when his captors fled. Mitchell later reported that the man, who had a wife and children, had been given away by the local white pastor who claimed a $100 bounty.

Mitchell was an active supporter of the movement that was smuggling escaped slaves from the American South to Canada before the 1860s American Civil War. He said that he was most active when he was living in the city of Washington Court House in Fayette County, Ohio. His house was a safe house for John Mason who brought 265 escapees to Mitchell's home.

Mitchell is said to be the only writer who wrote about the Underground Railroad while it was still illegal, although others had described it at an earlier date. The British writer Harriet Martineau had mentioned the concept in 1837 and the British abolitionist Joseph Sturge wrote about it in 1841, but they did not name it. Mitchell's book took the name of the Underground Railroad into his book's title, although the phrase had been used before by James Stirling in 1857. Mitchell's book was published in London in 1860. Mitchell's book garnered recommendations from leading abolitionists including the American activist William Howard Day and the British politician George Thompson.

Mitchell was a minister in Toronto with the American Baptist Free Mission Society. He visited Britain in 1859 where he toured with the Reverend William Troy. The two of them both wrote books and they went on lecture tours of anti-slavery groups in Ireland, Scotland and England (all then part of the United Kingdom) and gathered funds for their churches in Canada. Mitchell's book particularly thanked the Glasgow Emancipation Society who supported his work and his book.

Despite the death of his daughter, Mitchell traveled again to Great Britain in 1863 to 1864 when a controversy erupted over his poor accounting and the potential mixing of his expenses with the hundreds of pounds (sterling) that he was meant to be sending back to Canada. Mitchell and his family are presumed to have returned to America. One record shows that he died before 1879 but there is no further detail.

== Works ==
- The Under-Ground Railroad

== See also ==
- List of non-fiction writers
- List of people from North Carolina
- List of people from Ohio
- Lists of American writers
