= Nineteenth Street Baptist Church (Washington, D.C.) =

Church in Washington. D.C

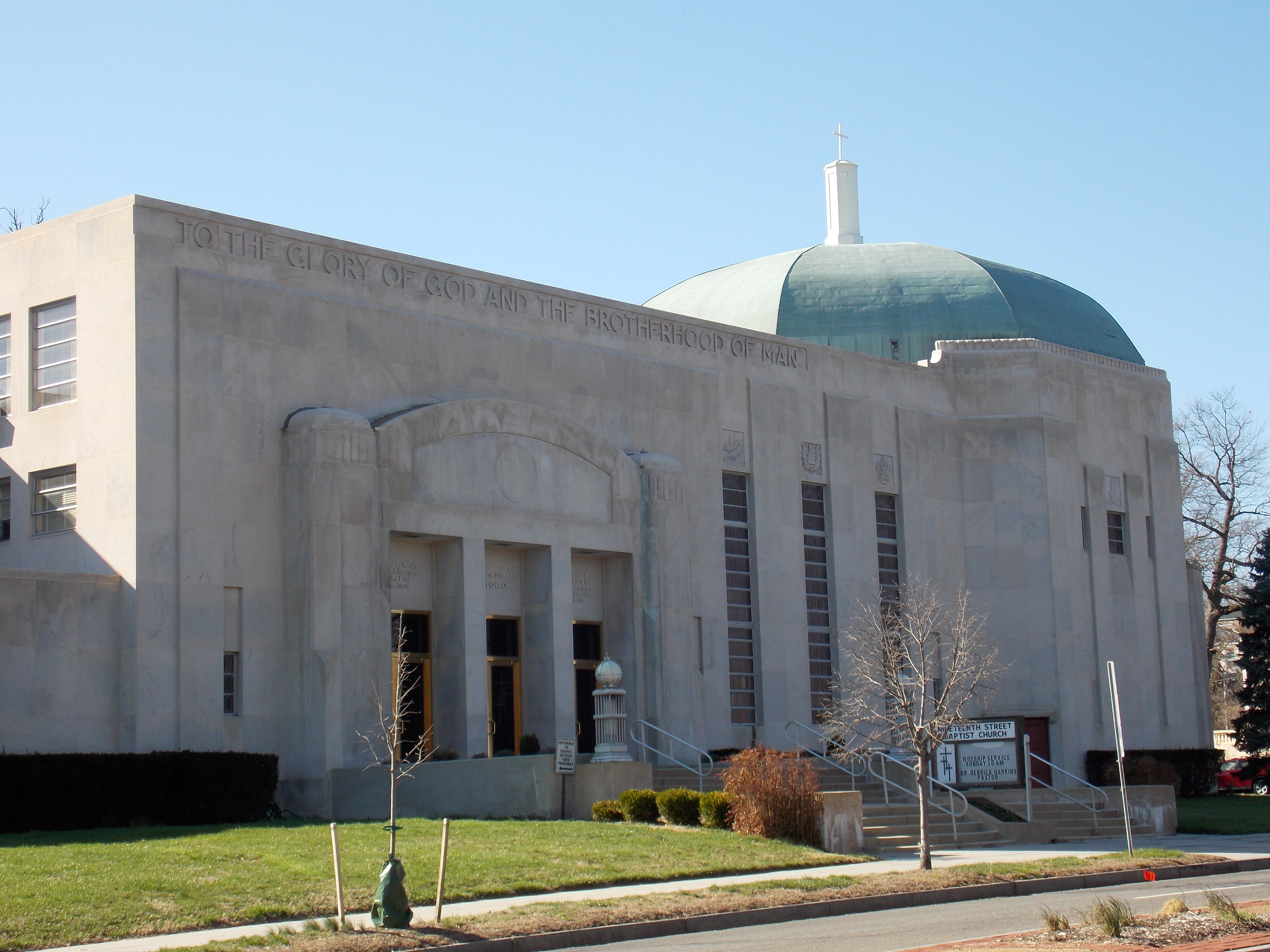
- Nineteenth Street Baptist Church

Religion
- Affiliation: National Baptist Convention, USA, Inc.
- Leadership: Rev. Kevin Lamàr Peterman
- Status: Active

Location
- Location: 4606 16th Street N.W.. Washington, D.C. 20011
- Interactive map of Nineteenth Street Baptist Church
- Coordinates: 38°56′48.5″N 77°2′12.5″W

Architecture
- Architects: Brandt, Waronoff and Westric
- Style: Art Deco
- Established: 1839
- Materials: Alabama limestone

Website
- 19thstreetbc.org

The Nineteenth Street Baptist Church, located on 16th Street, NW, is considered to be the first and oldest, independent black Baptist congregation in Washington, D.C. Since its founding in 1839, the church has figured prominently within the historical and social fabric of Washington, D.C.'s African American community.

== History ==
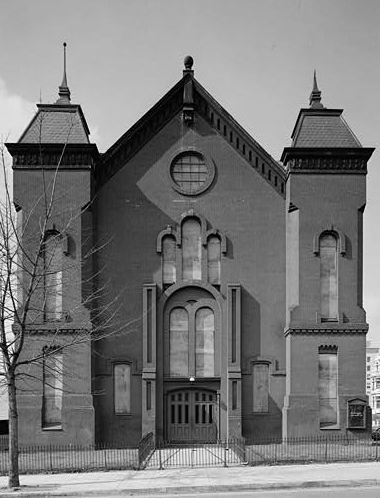
The original site of Nineteenth Street Baptist Church

Established as the First Colored Baptist Church of Washington, D.C., on August 29, 1839, the congregation finds its earliest beginnings within The First Baptist Church of the City of Washington, D.C., which was founded on March 7, 1802. Described initially as an interracial congregation, black members worshipped alongside whites. However, similar to other congregations of the time, the church gradually began to segregate its black members from white parishioners. Given their discontent with being assigned to the gallery of what was now the new location of the First Baptist Church, in 1833 a majority of the black members chose to return to the original site located at 19th and I Streets, N.W. The black members of the First Baptist Church continued to worship under the authority of the parent church at the 19th and I Streets location until 1839 when they expressed interest in being organized as a separate body. Reverend Sampson White, who was also instrumental in the establishment of the Concord Baptist Church of Christ, Abyssinian Baptist Church both in New York City, Kaighn Avenue Baptist Church in Camden, New Jersey, and Alfred Street Baptist Church in Alexandria, Virginia, would play an integral role in the founding of the independent congregation.

Sampson White, who had begun to organize a smaller group of black worshipers not from the First Baptist Church, secured recognition from leading white and black Baptists of Baltimore to establish a church. The original members of White's group included his wife, William Bush, Eliza Bush, Lavinia Perry and Emily Coke. With recognition secured, Sampson White's small group received into their body all of the black members of the First Baptist Church currently worshipping at the 19th and I Streets location. With the addition of these members, the membership swelled to a number ten times the size of White's original group. With the new members being in possession of the property at 19th and I Streets—an assertion that would be challenged for some years—the First Colored Baptist Church of Washington, D.C., was established in 1839 with Sampson White serving as its first pastor.

The congregation eventually purchased the property on the southwest corner of 19th and I Streets, N.W. Soon after its founding, the church was admitted to the Philadelphia Baptist Association in October 1840. From 1839 to 1882, the church experienced rapid development including the organization of a Board of Deacons, a Board of Trustees, the Missionary Society, the Christian Mite Society, the Senior Choir, the Sunday School and the formulation of the church's Rules of Decorum. In 1867, the American Baptist Home Mission Society used the basement of the church to offer courses to freedmen interested in entering the Baptist ministry. The program would eventually become the Wayland Seminary. On November 16, 1870, the church received its charter and was incorporated as the Nineteenth Street Baptist Church. A new edifice would be erected in 1871 and serve as the worship site for over a century.

On January 26, 1975, the church moved to the former Bnai Israel Jewish synagogue at its current location on 16th Street.

== Leadership ==
The Nineteenth Street Baptist Church's history includes fourteen pastors since its inception in 1839; however, the church's sustained leadership, which has included only five pastors over the last 140 years, has contributed to its growth and noteworthiness among African American communities.

=== Walter Henderson Brooks ===
On November 12, 1882, Reverend Dr. Walter Henderson Brooks—then referred to as the Dean of ministers of Washington, D.C.—was installed as the pastor of Nineteenth Street Baptist Church. Under Brooks' pastorate, which spanned over sixty years, the church membership grew to over 3,500 and attracted leaders of the African American community. The church became one of the nation's leading Baptist congregations and wielded considerable influence.

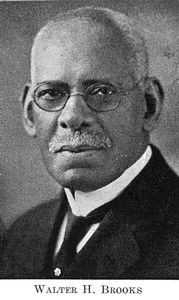
Pastor of Nineteenth Street Baptist Church from 1882-1945

Walter Henderson Brooks had already established a reputation as an advocate for education, racial equality, and temperance. Born a slave in Richmond, Virginia, to Albert Royal Brooks and Lucy Goode Brooks, Brooks graduated from Lincoln University (Pennsylvania) where he studied with fellow contemporaries, Archibald and Francis Grimke'. Brooks' wife, Evalin "Eva" Holmes Brooks, was the daughter of Reverend James Henry Holmes who served as pastor of the renowned First African Baptist Church of Richmond, Virginia. Brooks advocated for the inclusion of liberal arts courses within the curricula of black Baptist colleges, like those found at Howard and Fisk universities. Brooks was among the black ministers and churchwomen who called for the inclusion of writings by black theologians within the American Baptist Publication Society's literature. In addition to influencing the establishment of both the National Baptist Publishing Board and the National Baptist Convention, U.S.A., Walter Henderson Brooks also served as vice-president of the Bethel Literary and Historical Society under John W. Cromwell and was a member of the Association for the Study of African American Life and History. He also received honorary Doctorates of Divinity from Howard University, Roger Williams University in Nashville, Tennessee, and the State University in Louisville, Kentucky.

During Brooks' tenure, the church played host to prominent historical events including the First Annual Convention of the National Federation of Afro-American Women during which the National Association of Colored Women was founded on July 21, 1896. In 1915, black Civil War veterans of the Union Army met at the church to both commemorate the fiftieth anniversary of the war's end and organize a “colored citizens’ committee” to build a monument to honor black achievement. The meeting would be credited with serving as the catalyst for the Smithsonian's National Museum of African American History and Culture. The church's membership included Brooks' daughter, Julia Evangeline Brooks who served as assistant principal and dean of girls at Washington's famed Paul Laurence Dunbar High School. She was also one of the incorporators of the nation's first black sorority, Alpha Kappa Alpha sorority. Noted Washington, D.C., clubwoman, educator, and suffragist, Nannie Helen Burroughs, as well as founder of the Manassas Industrial School for Colored Youth, Jennie Serepta Dean were both members during this time. Charles R. Drew, renowned physician, surgeon, and medical researcher who was recognized as the authority on the preparation and preservation of blood plasma, also attended the church under Brooks' pastorate. Nineteenth Street Baptist also counted prominent black families in the district among its membership. These family names included Syphax, Parker and Pierre. William P. Pierre, Albert Parker, and William Syphax, who was the first president of the board of trustees of the colored schools of Washington and Georgetown, all served as deacons during Brooks' pastorate. Brooks' leadership and social advocacy ushered Nineteenth Street Baptist Church into an era of prominence and activism among African American elites that continued well after his death in 1945.

=== Jerry A. Moore Jr. ===
In 1946, after the death of Walter Henderson Brooks, Reverend Dr. Jerry A. Moore Jr. became the pastor of Nineteenth Street Baptist Church. Moore, who had previously served as Brooks' pastoral assistant and student at Howard University's School of Divinity, received a B.A. from Morehouse College in 1940 and B.S. degree from Howard University. He later received an M.A. in 1957 from Howard University. Like his predecessor, Jerry A. Moore Jr. was active within the life of the Washington, D.C., community. From 1974 to 1984, Moore served as a member-at-large on Washington, D.C.'s City Council. He also co-founded the Conference of Minority Transportation Officials (COMTO) in 1971. Jerry A. Moore Jr. was also nominated to be the United States Ambassador to Lesotho. Moore's wife, the late Dr. Ettyce Hill Moore, served as a teacher, principal and executive administrator within the District of Columbia Public Schools system. She was also a professor at both Trinity College and Howard University.

Under Jerry A. Moore Jr. Nineteenth Street Baptist Church grew to include several programs and services including the Weekly Bulletin (1945), The Church News (1962–1966), and The Epistle (since 1977). He also created youth focused programs such as the Youth Church, Camp Mo-Tyce, vacation Bible School and scholarship and awards programs to encourage youth attendance. He also oversaw the establishment of Noonday Lenten Services which initially focused on federal workers but now draws a number of older adults. With the development of youth focused programs and expanding the outreach efforts of the church through the Radio-ministry, the Food Pantry and Homeless ministries, Moore's tenure focused on maintaining and strengthening the vitality of the church.

During this time, many of Nineteenth Street Baptist's parishioners had left the inner city neighborhood where the church had been located for 135 years. The church purchased the B'nai Israel Jewish Synagogue located along Washington, D.C.'s Gold Coast and on January 26, 1975, Jerry A. Moore Jr. led the church in its move from 19th and I Streets to its present location at 4606 16th Street, Northwest. Moore served as pastor of Nineteenth Street Baptist Church for over 50 years, retiring in 1996 and serving as interim pastor until 1997. Dr. Moore died on December 19, 2017.

=== Derrick Harkins ===
On July 25, 1997, the church elected Reverend Dr. Derrick Harkins as Pastor-Elect. He preached his first sermon at Nineteenth Street Baptist Church on August 31, 1997. Harkins, who received his B.S. from Boston University, a Master of Divinity from Union Theological Seminary of New York, and a Doctorate from United Seminary, was the senior pastor at New Hope Baptist Church in Dallas, Texas, and had served as assistant minister at the Abyssinian Baptist Church in New York. He is married to Juli Anne Davis Harkins.

During his pastorate, Derrick Harkins was involved in social activism at both the local and national levels. He advocated for immigration reform and addressed issues around racially motivated violence. Harkins also served as National Director of Faith Outreach for the Democratic National Committee. In that position, Harkins was responsible for all aspects of engaging the faith community. During his tenure, Nineteenth Street Baptist Church hosted President Barack Obama and his family twice during its Sunday service. Under the leadership of Dr. Derrick Harkins, Nineteenth Street Baptist Church continued to build and expand its mission. From extending the church's missionary work to Burkina Faso and Jamaica, to the establishment of new and more contemporary ministries, Nineteenth Street Baptist Church remained influential within the Washington, D.C., community. On February 18, 2015, Dr. Harkins announced that after 17 years, he would step down as pastor of Nineteenth Street Baptist Church to take the position of Senior Vice President for Innovations in Public Programming at Union Theological Seminary in New York. He preached his last sermon as senior pastor of Nineteenth Street Baptist Church on April 12, 2015. Reverend James A. Crosson, who served on the ministerial staff for more than thirty-five years and served as the Assistant Pastor for 17 years, assumed the role of Interim Pastor until 2016.

=== Darryl D. Roberts ===
On October 22, 2016, the membership of the Nineteenth Street Baptist Church elected Reverend Dr. Darryl D. Roberts to the position of Pastor-Elect. He delivered his first sermon as Senior Pastor at the Nineteenth Street Baptist Church on January 1, 2017. Prior to leading the Nineteenth Street Baptist Church, Dr. Roberts served as Senior Pastor of Mount Welcome Missionary Baptist Church in Decatur, Georgia. From 2007 to 2011, Dr. Roberts served as Associate Minister and Assistant Pastor of the Historic Ebenezer Baptist Church (Atlanta, Georgia), preceded by appointments as Intern and Associate Pastor at Olivet Institutional Baptist Church (Cleveland, Ohio), Calvary Baptist Church (Haverhill, Massachusetts), Salem Baptist Church (Chicago, Illinois), and Brentwood Baptist Church (Houston, Texas). Roberts' wife, Dr. Laura Morgan Roberts, served as Professor of Psychology, Culture and Organization Studies at Antioch University.

A native of Cleveland, Ohio, Dr. Roberts received his B.A. from Grinnell College in Grinnell, Iowa, a Master of Divinity from the University of Chicago, a Juris Doctor Degree from Boston College Law School, and a Doctor of Philosophy in Christian Ethics in the Ethics & Society Program at Emory University. A gifted writer, Roberts was recognized and published locally and nationally for his research projects and servant leadership. In the tradition of Nineteenth Street Baptist's previous pastors, Dr. Roberts demonstrated a strong commitment to social change at both the national and local levels. He coordinated initiatives for organizations such as: the Corporation for National & Community Service, the Boys and Girls Club of America, the Hewlett Packard Foundation, the Congressional Black Caucus Foundation, the American Baptist Churches of the South, The Carter Center, the Cleveland Job Corps, Southern Truth and Reconciliation, Junior Achievement and Americorps.

Nineteenth Street Baptist Church, under Dr. Roberts' leadership, secured a full-time youth pastor, expanded Youth Church, increased activities for social justice, and navigated the extreme challenges of the COVID-19 pandemic. His tenure as Senior Pastor ended on August 22, 2023.

=== Kevin Lamàr Peterman ===
In May 2025, Nineteenth Street Baptist Church elected Reverend Kevin Lamàr Peterman as Senior Pastor. Rev. Peterman was baptized and licensed to preach at the First Baptist Church of Vauxhall, N.J. While pursuing his theological education, he served as a pastoral intern at Trinity United Church of Christ in Chicago, Illinois. He was ordained at Cornerstone Baptist Church in Brooklyn, New York, where he served as Young Adult & Social Justice Minister. Rev. Peterman also served seven years as an Associate Pastor at the historic Shiloh Baptist Church (Washington, D.C.)

A native of Newark, New Jersey, Rev. Peterman graduated from Howard University where he earned a B.A. in political science. He earned his Master of Arts degree in Theological Studies from Princeton Theological Seminary and a Master of Science degree in Higher Education from the University of Pennsylvania.

In addition to his ministerial duties, Rev. Peterman has a distinguished career in higher education and nonprofit leadership. He served as Assistant Vice President and Chief of Staff at the United Negro College Fund (UNCF), Director of Strategic Initiatives at the Howard University School of Divinity, and Chief of Staff for the Next Step Adult Public Charter School. In 2024, he was inducted into the Martin Luther King, Jr. Board of Preachers and Collegium of Scholars at Morehouse College, which is among the highest honors bestowed upon African American clergy.

== The Mother Church ==
Throughout its history, the Nineteenth Street Baptist Church has produced several other prominent congregations. They include, Second Baptist Church, which was originally named the Second Colored Baptist Church of Washington, D.C. (1848), Third Baptist Church (1857), Metropolitan Baptist Church, which was originally named Fourth Baptist Church (1864), Vermont Avenue Baptist, which was originally named the Fifth Baptist Church of Washington, D.C. (1866), Salem Baptist Church (1874) and Berean Baptist Church (1877).
