= Terrell Law School =

Historic American law school

Robert H. Terrell Law School
- Established: 1931
- School type: Private
- Location: Washington, D.C., U.S.

The Robert H. Terrell Law School was a historically black law school in Washington, D.C., that offered evening classes from its founding in 1931 until 1950. It was founded by George A. Parker, Philip W. Thomas, Louis R. Mehlinger, Benjamin Gaskins, Chester Jarvis, and Lafayette M. Hershaw after Howard University ended its evening law school program. The school was named after Robert Heberton Terrell, a longtime African-American judge of the District of Columbia Municipal Court (predecessor to the Superior Court of the District of Columbia), who died in 1925.

Parker had previously served as dean of the recently closed John M. Langston School of Law at Frelinghuysen University. Terrell Law School attracted other Langston faculty. During its 19 years of operation, the Terrell School educated the majority of black law students in the city. After graduating about 600 lawyers, it closed in 1950 as other law schools became integrated.

== Alumni ==
- Austin L. Fickling, first black judge of the District of Columbia Court of Appeals
- Willie Stevenson Glanton, first black woman elected to the Iowa House of Representatives
- Ruby Hurley, civil rights leader
- John Oliver Killens, writer (did not graduate)
- Harry McAlpin, reporter
- Hubert B. Pair, judge of the District of Columbia Court of Appeals
- Wilhelmina Rolark, member of the Council of the District of Columbia

== Faculty ==
- Austin L. Fickling
- Lafayette M. Hershaw, journalist and lawyer who co-founded the school and also served as president
- Belford Lawson Jr., attorney and civil rights activist
- Hubert B. Pair
- Barrington D. Parker, United States district judge and son of the school's founder

== See also ==
- List of defunct law schools in the United States

== Sources ==
- Campbell, Crispin (December 8, 1982). "Reminiscences: D.C. Lawyer Turning 100".
