= John M. Ferren =

American judge (born 1937)

John Ferren

Senior Judge of the District of Columbia Court of Appeals
- In office 1999–2023

Corporation Counsel of the District of Columbia
- In office September 24, 1997 – April 19, 1999
- Mayor: Marion Barry; Anthony A. Williams
- Preceded by: Jo Anne Robinson (acting)
- Succeeded by: Jo Anne Robinson (acting)

Associate Judge of the District of Columbia Court of Appeals
- In office 1977–1997
- Appointed by: Jimmy Carter
- Preceded by: Austin L. Fickling
- Succeeded by: Stephen H. Glickman

Personal details
- Born: John Maxwell Ferren; July 21, 1937 (age 88) Kansas City, Missouri, U.S.
- Spouse: Linda Ferren
- Education: Harvard University (BA, JD)

John Maxwell Ferren (born July 21, 1937) is a former associate judge of the District of Columbia Court of Appeals. He served as an associate judge on the court from 1977 to 1997, left to serve as corporation counsel for the District of Columbia for two years, and returned to serve as a senior judge. He retired from the court in 2023.

== Biography ==
Ferren was raised in the Kansas City area and in Evanston, Illinois, where he graduated from Evanston Township High School in 1955. After obtaining bachelor's and law degrees from Harvard University, he took a job in Chicago at Kirkland, Ellis, Hodson, Chaffetz & Masters. While in Chicago he helped organize volunteer legal services for the indigent as part of an organization that became Chicago Volunteer Legal Services. In 1966, Ferren returned to Harvard Law School to establish and direct a new federally funded neighborhood law office serving low-income clients. In 1970, he moved to Washington, D.C., where Hogan & Hartson hired him to lead their new Community Services Department, the first practice group at a major law firm devoted exclusively to pro bono legal services. During his seven years leading the department, Ferren represented members of the Black Panther Party against the Metropolitan Police Department of the District of Columbia and challenged the Nixon administration's attempts to dismantle federal poverty programs.

In 1977, Ferren was nominated by President Carter to the D.C. Court of Appeals and confirmed by the Senate. He acquired a reputation as a liberal judge and was respected even by government lawyers and prosecutors whom he often ruled against. In 1997, he left the bench to become the District's corporation counsel, a role in which he attempted to defend D.C.'s autonomy against the federally imposed District of Columbia Financial Control Board. After stepping down in 1999, he rejoined the court as a senior judge and completed work on his book, Salt of the Earth, Conscience of the Court: The Story of Justice Wiley Rutledge, which was published by the University of North Carolina Press in 2004 and won several awards.

== Sources ==
- The Lawyer at Center Stage; D.C. Corporation Counsel John Ferren Hopes to Direct the City's Comeback, Washington Post, January 21, 1998

Legal offices
Preceded by Austin L. Fickling	Judge of the District of Columbia Court of Appeals; 1977-1997	Succeeded by Stephen H. Glickman
Preceded by Jo Anne Robinson; Acting	Corporation Counsel of the District of Columbia; 1997–1999	Succeeded by Jo Anne Robinson; Acting
