= Austin L. Fickling =

American judge (1914–1977)

Associate Judge of the District of Columbia Court of Appeals
- In office March 11, 1968 – March 6, 1977
- Nominated by: Lyndon B. Johnson
- Succeeded by: John M. Ferren

Personal details
- Born: May 11, 1914 Washington, D.C., U.S.
- Died: March 6, 1977 (aged 62) Washington, D.C., U.S.
- Spouse: Doris Lee Dickens Fickling
- Children: Ralph L. Fickling, Phyllis Glaude

Austin LeCount Fickling (May 11, 1914 – March 6, 1977) was the first African-American judge of the District of Columbia Court of Appeals, the highest court for the District of Columbia.

== Background ==
Fickling was born and raised in Washington, D.C., graduating from Dunbar High School. He attended Miner Teachers College and received his law degree from Terrell Law School. He was a member of the D.C. branch of the National Association for the Advancement of Colored People, and in the 1940s he litigated several cases as part of the branch legal redress committee. In 1944 and 1945, for example, he unsuccessfully challenged the composition of condemnation juries in eminent domain actions in the District of Columbia; although the court acknowledged that "neither a person of the colored race nor any female member of the white race has ever sat on a condemnation panel," it held that no illegal discrimination had occurred.

In 1954, Fickling became an Assistant United States Attorney in the United States Attorney's Office for the District of Columbia. In 1956, President Eisenhower appointed him to the D.C. Municipal Court, a predecessor to the Superior Court of the District of Columbia. In 1967, President Johnson nominated him to the appeals court when that court was expanded from three to six seats. Fickling was the first African-American ever nominated to an appellate court in the District of Columbia. He was the second-longest serving member of that court when he died of cancer in 1977.

== Sources ==
- Dale Andrews & Lawrence Mintz, Austin L. Fickling: A Memorial and Retrospective, 22 Howard L.J. 169 (1979).
