= Harry McAlpin =

American journalist

Harry Sylvester McAlpin Jr.
- Born: July 21, 1906; St. Louis, Missouri
- Died: July 18, 1985 (aged 78); Washington, D.C., U.S.
- Occupation: Reporter
- Years active: 1926–1953
- Known for: First African-American reporter to attend a U.S. Presidential news conference

Harry Sylvester McAlpin Jr. (July 21, 1906 – July 18, 1985) was an American reporter. He was the first African-American reporter to attend a U.S. Presidential news conference in 1944.

== Biography ==
Harry Sylvester McAlpin Jr. was born in St. Louis, Missouri. He hoped to study journalism at the University of Missouri but could not because the school was racially segregated. He instead studied journalism and advertising at the University of Wisconsin. After graduating in 1926, he moved to Washington, D.C., where he worked as a reporter, editor, and office manager for the Washington Tribune, an African American weekly paper, from 1926 to 1929. He then handled publicity and advertising for the National Benefit Life Insurance Company from 1929 to 1933.

When the New Deal got underway in 1933, McAlpin joined the New Negro Alliance to "protect employment of Negroes under the [National Recovery Administration] program." He served in the Federal Security Agency and the U.S. Employment Service while attending the Robert H. Terrell Law School at night. He passed the D.C. bar examination in 1937. McAlpin became an assistant to Mary McLeod Bethune, Director of Negro Affairs at the National Youth Administration. On the side, he worked as a part-time Washington correspondent for the Chicago Defender.

In 1943 the National Negro Publishers Association (NNPA) petitioned the White House Correspondents Association (WHCA) for press credentials on the grounds that the Atlanta Daily World was one of its member papers. All other African American papers at the time were weeklies, and the press credentials were limited to reporters for daily papers. The WHCA agreed but it took several more months before the NNPA could afford to open its own Washington bureau and hire McAlpin as its full-time Washington correspondent. On February 8, 1944, he attended his first presidential press conference and was greeted by President Franklin D. Roosevelt, who shook his hand and said, "I'm glad to see you, McAlpin, and very happy to have you here."

Although accredited at the White House, McAlpin was rejected when he applied for a congressional press pass. The Standing Committee of Correspondents that controlled accreditation for the newspaper press galleries at the Capitol regarded him as a reporter for mostly weekly papers, while the Periodical Press gallery rejected him because he reported for newspapers rather than magazines. McAlpin believed that these actions were influenced "by my racial identity rather than the flimsy technicality publicly stated."

Strong competition from a rival news service, the Associated Negro Press (ANP), led the NNPA to replace McAlpin as its Washington Correspondent with Louis Lautier. McAlpin moved to Louisville, Kentucky, where he served as the only African American assistant commonwealth attorney until 1953, when he resigned after being dropped from a criminal prosecution of three white women. McAlpin later became head of the Louisville chapter of the NAACP.

McAlpin died on July 18, 1985, in Washington, D.C..

== Legacy ==
McAlpin was posthumously honored by the White House Correspondents Association at their May 3, 2014 dinner. The WHCA created a scholarship in his memory, and President Barack Obama noted his pioneering journalism.
