= Leonard N. Smith =

American Baptist pastor (1961–2022)

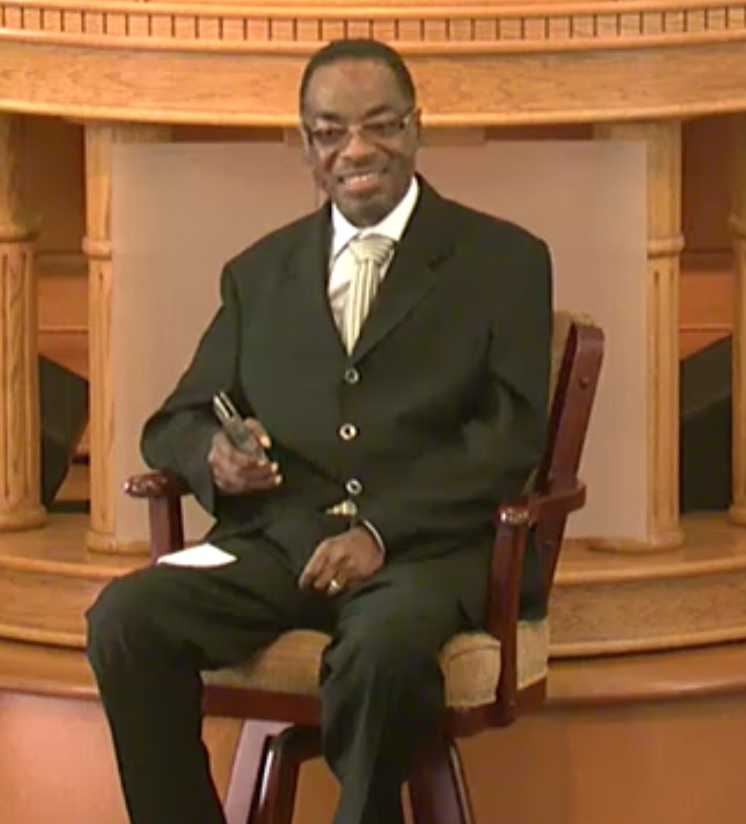
- Dr Leonard N Smith leads 2018 service
- Born: October 4, 1961
- Died: February 20, 2022 (aged 60)
- Occupation: Senior Pastor
- Years active: 1985-2021

Leonard N. Smith (born October 4, 1961 – February 20, 2022) was the senior pastor of Mount Zion Baptist Church in Arlington, Virginia, with a congregation exceeding 2,000. Mount Zion Baptist Church, founded in 1866, is the oldest Black congregation in Arlington, Virginia.

== Biography ==
Smith was born in Baltimore, Maryland, and raised partly in Washington, D.C. His grandmother provided a strong influence for his religious upbringing. He earned a doctorate of ministry in preaching from United Theological Seminary in Dayton, Ohio, as well as eight honorary degrees. He had two children.

== Ministry ==
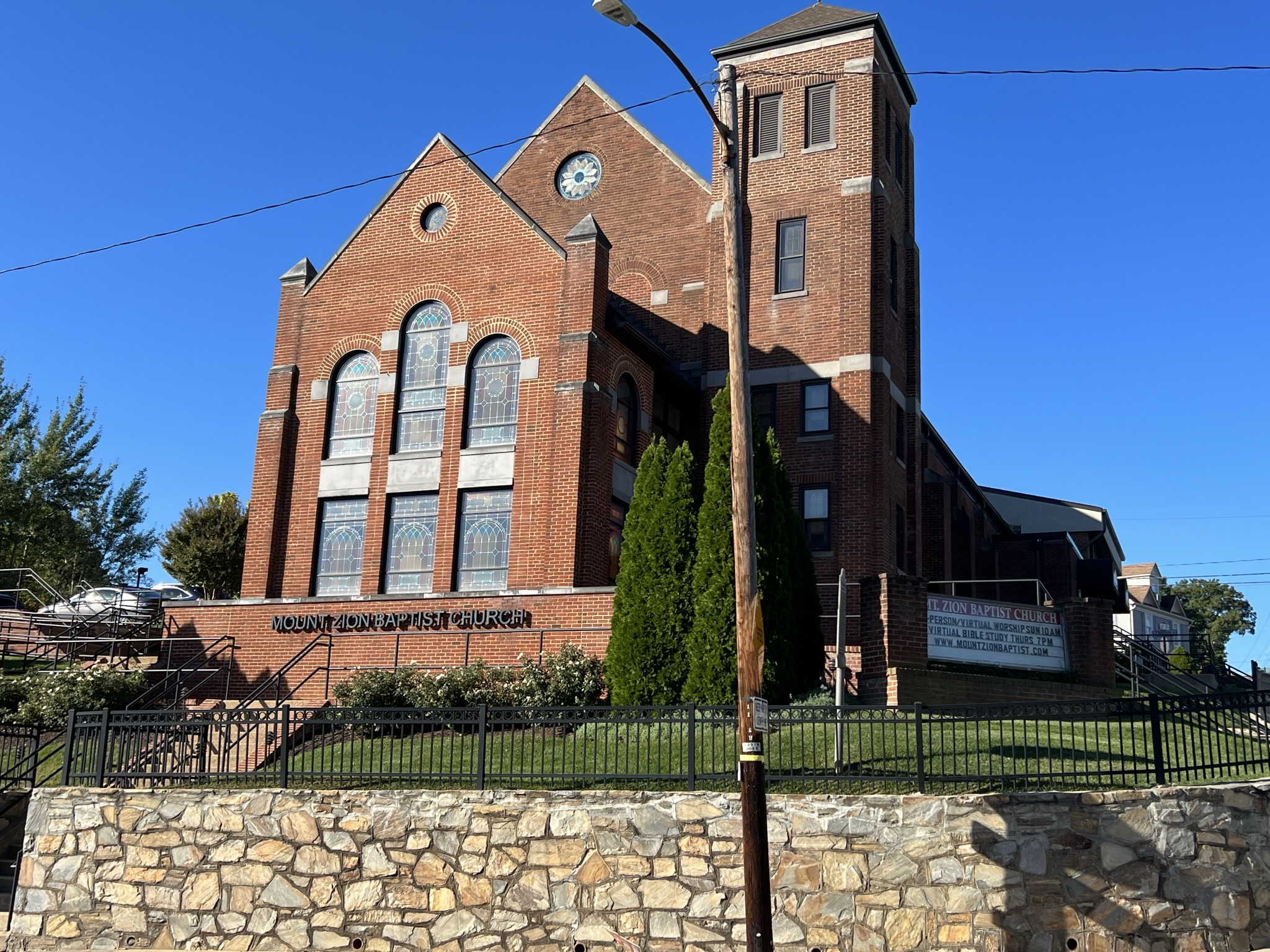
Mount Zion Baptist Church Arlington VA

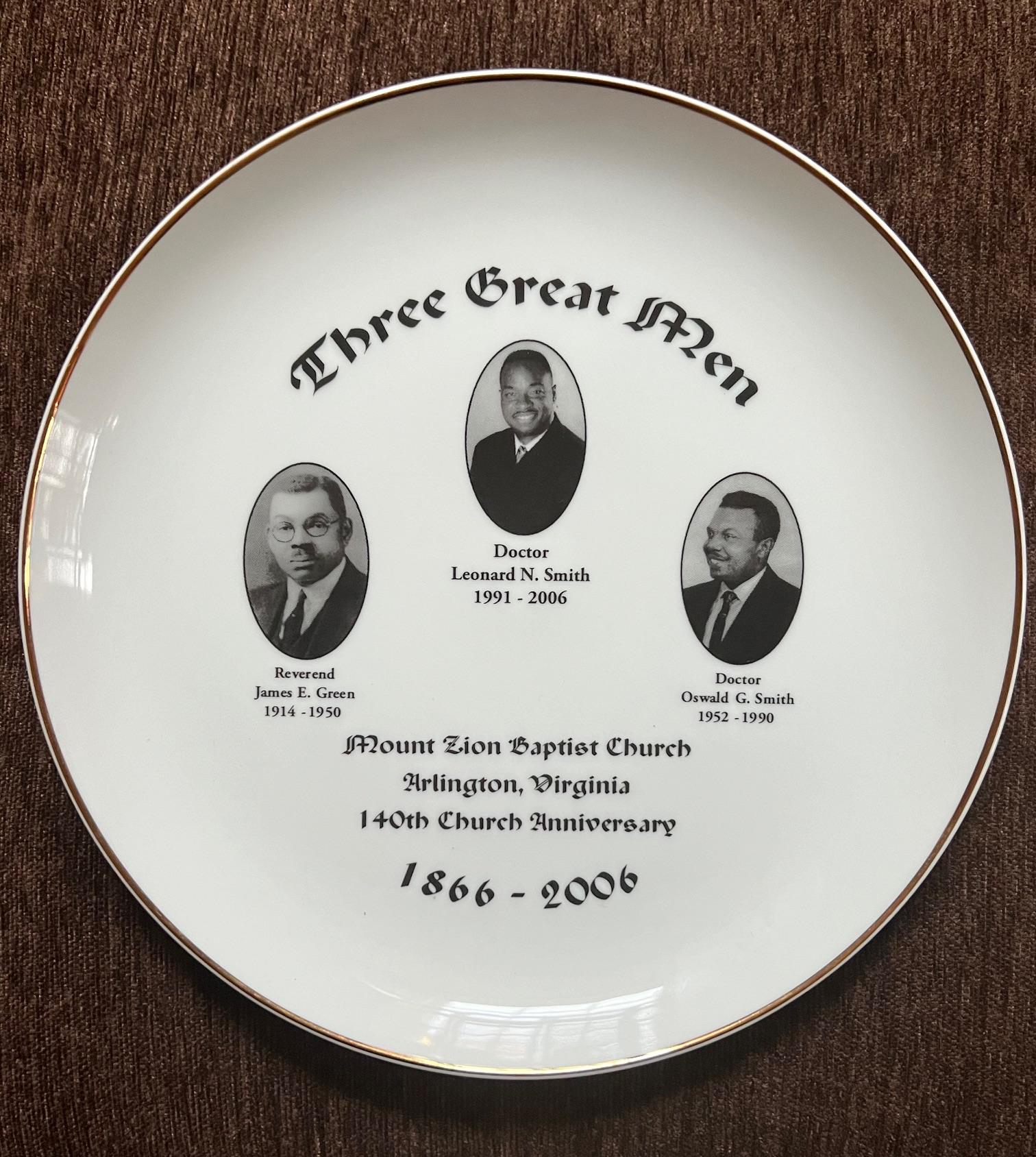
2006 Commemorative 140th church anniversary plate.

Smith began ministry in 1985 as pastor of Union Baptist Church in Gordonsville, Virginia. During his tenure there as its fifth pastor, a Mass Choir was started, a church parsonage purchased, and church renovations started and completed. Four years later, he was called to Rivermont Baptist Church in Lynchburg, Virginia.

In 1991, Smith became senior pastor at Mount Zion Baptist Church in Arlington, Virginia. The church was founded just after the Civil War in 1866 as the Old Bell Church and located in the free black settlement of Freedman's Village, now the site of Arlington National Cemetery. The current location is in the established community of Nauck.

He served as a chaplain for both the Arlington County Fire and Police Departments. The Arlington County Fire Department was one of the primary responding agencies to the 9/11 attack on the Pentagon. As fire department chaplain, Smith was among the first on the scene after the tragedy and provided spiritual support to responders.

Smith was former president (2009–2012) of the Virginia Baptist State Convention (VBSC), which was organized in 1867 and counts about 700 member churches. VBSC is affiliated with the National Baptist Convention, USA, Inc. He was also a past president of Richmond Virginia Seminary, having served from 2005 to 2008.

== Books ==
- We Need to Talk: Saying What We Need to Say Without Hurting Each Other. Foreword by Audrey B. Chapman (2012)
- Seen and Sustained: Increase the Visibility and Income of the Local Church. Co-author with Akia T. Garnett. (2010)

== Honors ==
In 2018, the National Park Service awarded grants for the preservation of historic structures on several campuses of Historically Black Colleges and Universities, including the Virginia University of Lynchburg. The $499,713 grant to Virginia University of Lynchburg was for preservation of Humbles Hall.

In 2020, the Virginia University of Lynchburg School of Religion, located in Humbles Hall, was renamed The Leonard N. Smith School of Religion.

== External references ==
- Mount Zion Baptist Church, Arlington, VA Official Website
- Virginia University of Lynchburg, The Leonard N. Smith School of Religion
