= Vijay Shanker =

American judge (born 1972)

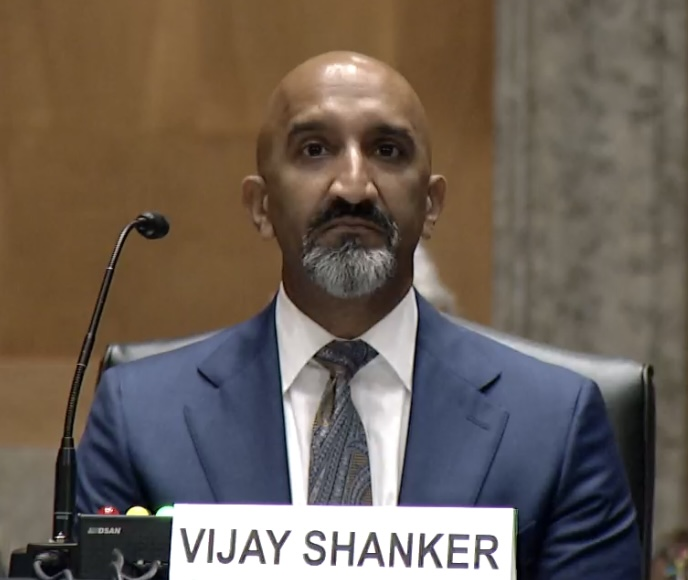

Judge of the District of Columbia Court of Appeals
- Incumbent
- Assumed office December 21, 2022
- Appointed by: Joe Biden
- Preceded by: Stephen H. Glickman

Personal details
- Born: April 2, 1972 (age 54) Youngstown, Ohio, U.S.
- Education: Duke University (BA); University of Virginia (JD)

Vijay Shanker (born April 2, 1972) is an American lawyer who is a judge of the District of Columbia Court of Appeals.

== Education ==
Shanker earned a Bachelor of Arts degree from Duke University in 1994 and a Juris Doctor from the University of Virginia School of Law in 1999, where he served as a notes editor for the Virginia Law Review, was inducted into the Order of the Coif, and received the Law School Alumni Association Best Note Award.

== Career ==
From 2000 and 2001, Shanker served as a law clerk for Judge Chester J. Straub of the United States Court of Appeals for the Second Circuit. He worked as an associate at Mayer Brown from 2004 to 2005 and at Covington & Burling from 1999 to 2000 and 2001 to 2004. Shanker joined the United States Department of Justice Criminal Division in 2005. He previously served as counselor and acting deputy chief of staff to the assistant attorney General for the Criminal Division and senior litigation counsel in the division's fraud section. Shanker was also an associate adjunct professor of law at the Washington College of Law.

=== D.C. Court service ===
==== Nomination under Trump ====
On June 25, 2020, President Donald Trump nominated Shanker to serve as a judge of the District of Columbia Court of Appeals. President Trump nominated Shanker to the seat vacated by Judge John R. Fisher, who assumed senior status on August 22, 2020. On January 3, 2021, his nomination was returned to the President under Rule XXXI, Paragraph 6 of the United States Senate. He was renominated the same day and his nomination was withdrawn by President Joe Biden on February 4, 2021.

==== Renomination under Biden ====
On July 14, 2022, President Joe Biden nominated Shanker to serve as a judge of the District of Columbia Court of Appeals. President Biden nominated Shanker to the seat vacated by Judge Stephen H. Glickman, who retired on June 25, 2022. On September 21, 2022, a hearing on his nomination was held before the Senate Homeland Security and Governmental Affairs Committee. On September 28, 2022, his nomination was favorably reported out of the committee by voice vote en bloc, with Senator Rick Scott voting no on record. On December 15, 2022, the United States Senate confirmed his nomination by a voice vote. He was sworn in on December 21, 2022.

Legal offices
Preceded by Stephen H. Glickman	Judge of the District of Columbia Court of Appeals; 2022–present	Incumbent
