= Julia Cooper Mack =

American judge

Senior Judge of the District of Columbia Court of Appeals
- In office 1989–2001

Judge of the District of Columbia Court of Appeals
- In office 1975–1989
- Nominated by: Gerald Ford
- Preceded by: Hubert B. Pair
- Succeeded by: Annice M. Wagner

Personal details
- Born: Julia Perry; July 17, 1920 Fayetteville, North Carolina, U.S.
- Died: January 17, 2014 (aged 93) Washington, D.C., U.S.
- Spouse(s): Jerry S. Cooper (divorced); Clifford J. Mack (d. 1971)
- Children: Cheryl (Cooper) Pleasants (daughter); Lydia Tucker (stepdaughter)
- Education: Hampton University (BA); Howard University (LLB)

Julia Cooper Mack (née Perry; July 17, 1920 – January 17, 2014) was a judge of the District of Columbia Court of Appeals. She was appointed to this position in 1975. She was the first African American woman appointed to a court of last resort in the United States.

She was born to Dallas Leary Perry Jr. and Emily (McCoy) Perry.

She earned her bachelor's degree in mathematics from Hampton University and her law degree from Howard University. One of her first law clerks was Allyson K. Duncan, who later became the first African American woman appointed to the United States Court of Appeals for the Fourth Circuit.

== See also ==
- List of first women lawyers and judges in Washington D.C.

== Sources ==
- Speaking Truth to Power: The Jurisprudence of Julia Cooper Mack, 40 Howard L.J. 291 (1996-1997)
- "Julia Cooper Mack, D.C. appellate judge, dies at 93". The Washington Post. January 30, 2014.
- Inez Smith Reid, Historical Links: The Remarkable Legacy and Legal Journey of the Honorable Julia Cooper Mack, 8 U.D.C. L. Rev. 303 (2004)
