= Stephen H. Glickman =

American judge

Stephen Glickman

Senior Judge of the District of Columbia Court of Appeals
- Incumbent
- Assumed office December 21, 2022

Associate Judge of the District of Columbia Court of Appeals
- In office 1999 – June 25, 2022
- Appointed by: Bill Clinton
- Preceded by: John M. Ferren
- Succeeded by: Vijay Shanker

Personal details
- Born: Stephen Howard Glickman; June 25, 1948 (age 77) New York City, New York, U.S.
- Education: Cornell University (BA); Yale University (JD)

Stephen Howard Glickman (born June 25, 1948) is a senior judge of the District of Columbia Court of Appeals, the highest appellate court for the District of Columbia.

== Education and career ==
After graduating from law school, he worked as a law clerk on the Supreme Court of Connecticut and a seminar instructor at Yale University before moving to Washington, D.C., where he worked at the Federal Trade Commission's Bureau of Competition and the Public Defender Service for the District of Columbia. From 1980 until 1999, he worked at the law firm Zuckerman Spaeder, serving as managing partner from 1991 to 1998. He retired from the active service on June 25, 2022.

== Personal life ==
Glickman resides in Washington D.C., with his wife, Ann. He has two children and one grandchild.

Legal offices
Preceded by John M. Ferren	Judge of the District of Columbia Court of Appeals; 1999–2022	Succeeded by Vijay Shanker
