= Friendship Baptist Church (Washington, D.C.) =

Historic church in Washington, D.C., United States

- U.S. National Register of Historic Places
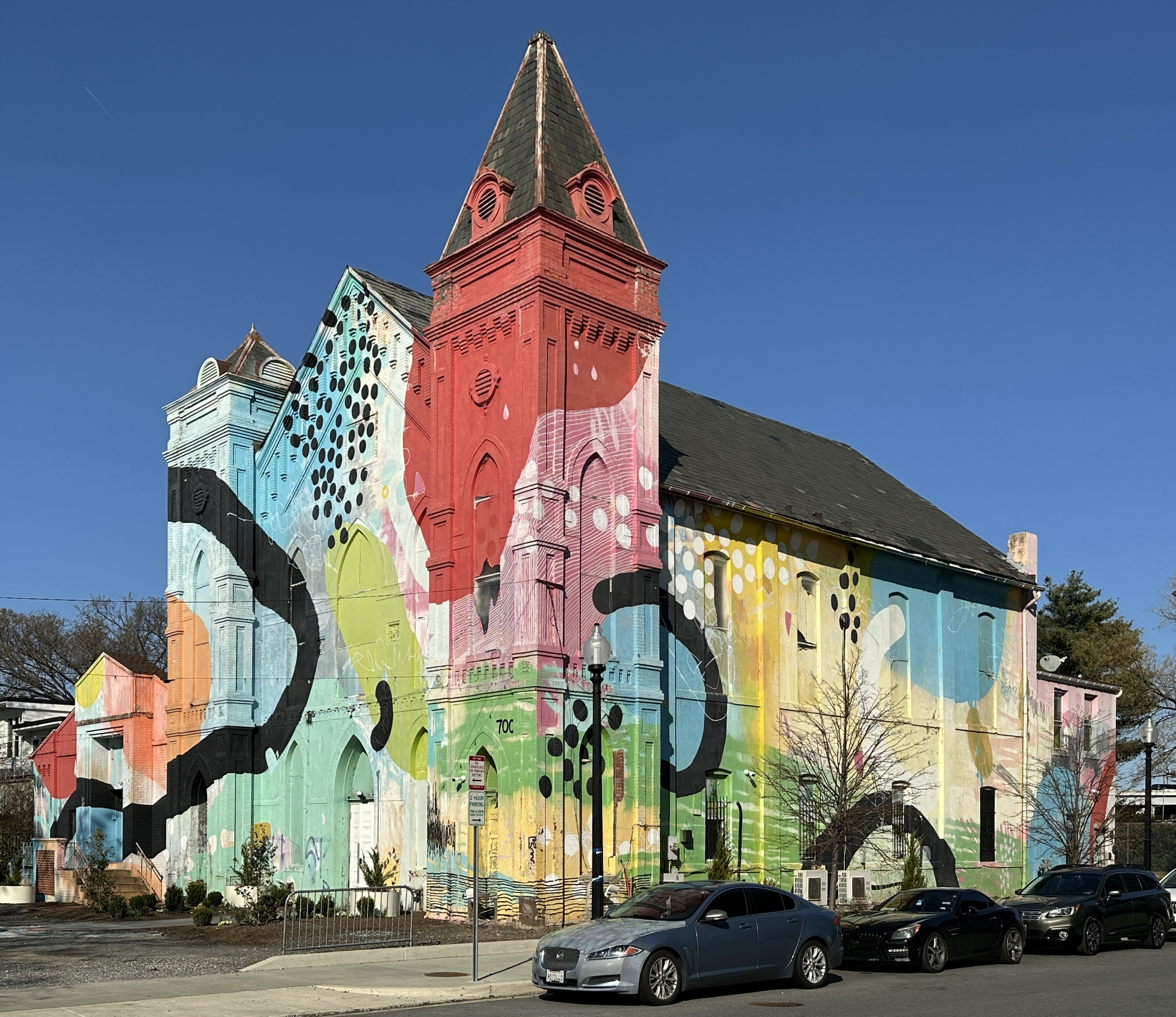
- Culture House DC, since 2013

- Location within Central Washington, D.C. Location within the District of Columbia Location within the United States
- Location: 734 First Street SW Washington, D.C.
- Coordinates: 38°52′49.6″N 77°0′42.6″W
- Built: 1886
- Built by: James A. Boyce
- Architectural style: Romanesque Revival
- NRHP reference No.: 04001236
- Added to NRHP: November 19, 2004

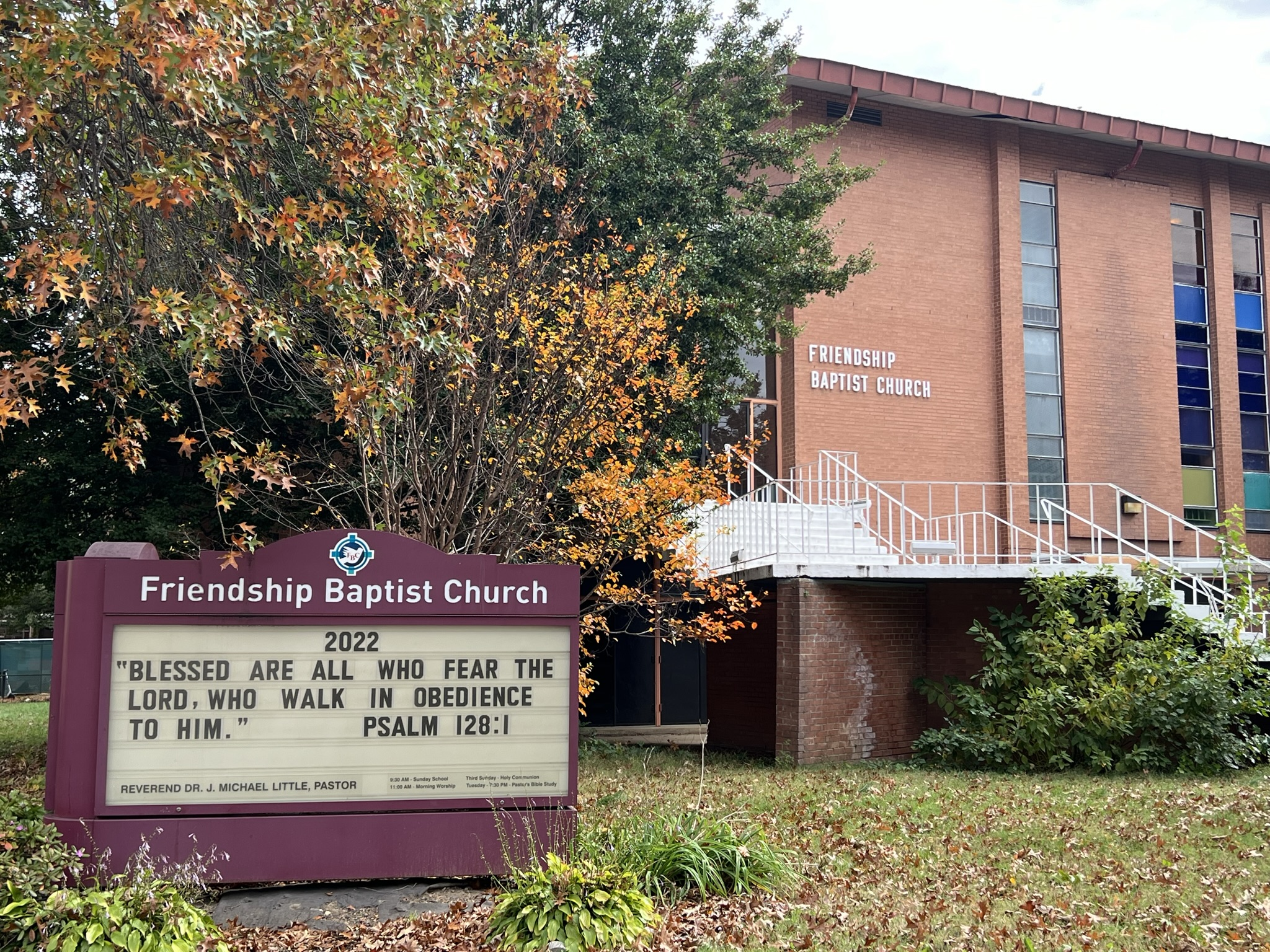
Friendship Baptist Church Washington DC in 2022.

Friendship Baptist Church is a Baptist church located in the Southwest Waterfront neighborhood of Washington, D.C. It was originally known as Virginia Avenue Baptist Church. Organized in 1875, the church is one of Washington, D.C.'s oldest African American congregations.

== Former building ==
The former church building, located at 734 First Street SW, was built by James A. Boyce in 1886. Friendship Baptist Church moved from that building in 1965 and it was subsequently occupied by Miracle Temple of Faith in about 1974. Later it was occupied by Redeemed Temple of Jesus Christ (during 1982–2001). It was listed on the National Register of Historic Places in 2004.

The First Street church building is now occupied by the Blind Whino Arts Club, and was repainted with a full wrap-around mural.

The building has a central gable facade with two corner towers. It is described as having "a vernacular interpretation of the Romanesque Revival style with some Gothic Revival details (namely lancet arch windows)."

== Church leaders ==
Friendship Baptist Church has been led by the following pastors:

- Reverend Robert S. Laws (1875-1891)
- Reverend W.H. Scott (1891-1892)
- Reverend J.T. Clark (1892)
- Reverend A.W. Shields (1892-1896)
- Reverend Alexander A. Wilbanks (1896-1915)
- Reverend Jerry Fields (1917-1918)
- Reverend D.Y. Campbell (1922-1926)
- Reverend Benjamin H. Whiting (1927-1980)
- Reverend William Henry Montgomery (1981-1993)
- Reverend Dr. G. Martin Young (1996-1998)
- Reverend Milton A. Covington (1999-2002)
- Reverend Dr. Chester A. McDonald, Sr. (2002-2003)
- Reverend J. Michael Little (2003-Present)

== See also ==
- National Register of Historic Places listings in central Washington, D.C.
