= Metropolitan Baptist Church (Washington, D.C.) =

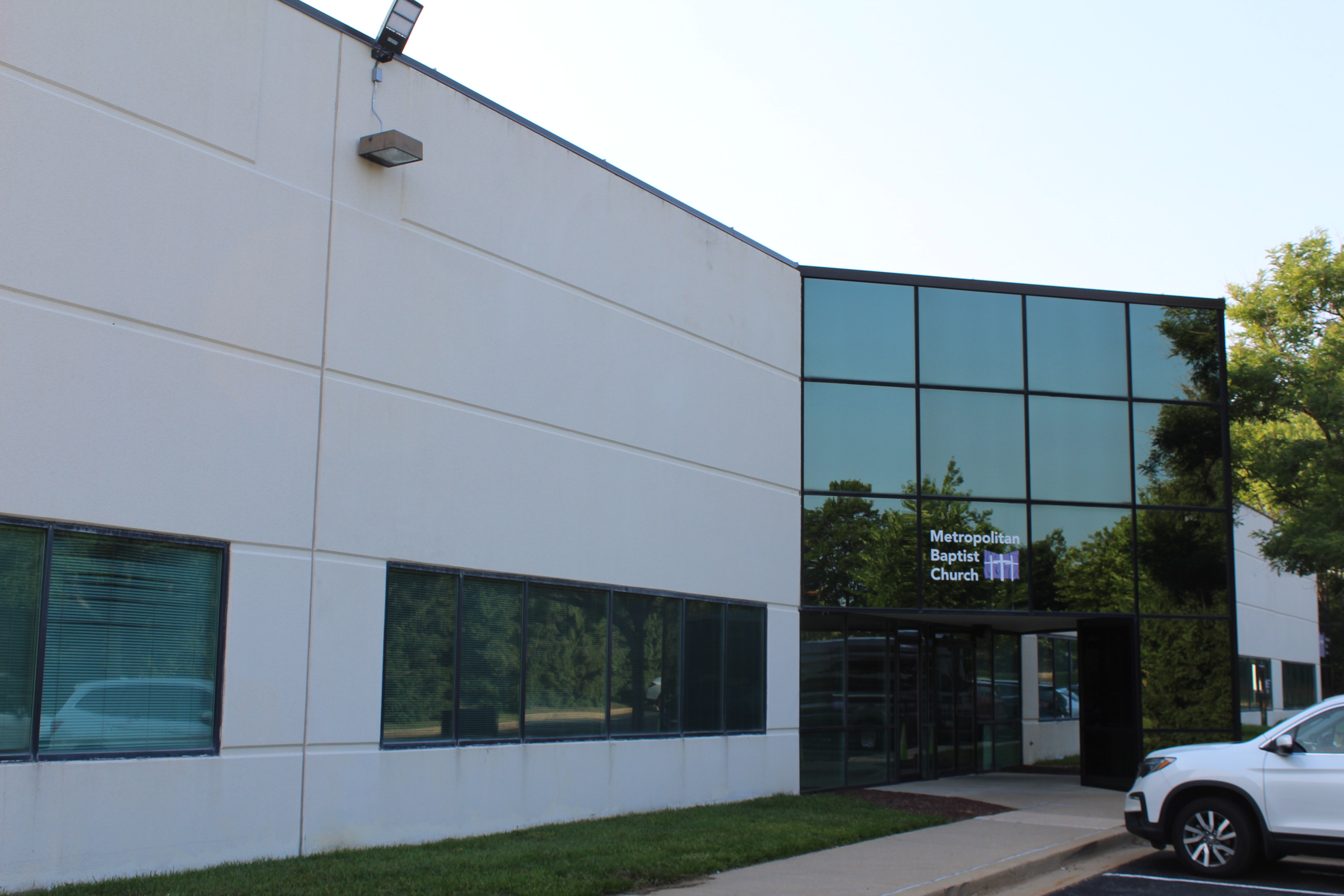
- The church's current location at 1200 Mercantile Lane in Largo, Maryland
- Metropolitan Baptist Church
- 38°54′23.4″N 76°50′16.7″W
- Location: 1200 Mercantile Lane, Largo, Maryland, U.S.
- Denomination: Baptist

History
- Former name: Fourth Baptist Church of Washington D.C.
- Founded: 1864
- Founder: Rev. Henry Bailey

Clergy
- Pastor: George L. Parks Jr. (2023–present)

The Metropolitan Baptist Church is a Baptist church founded in 1864. The Church has been located in several places in the DC Metropolitain area, but moved to their current address at 1200 Mercantile Lane in Largo, Maryland, U.S. in 2015.

== History ==
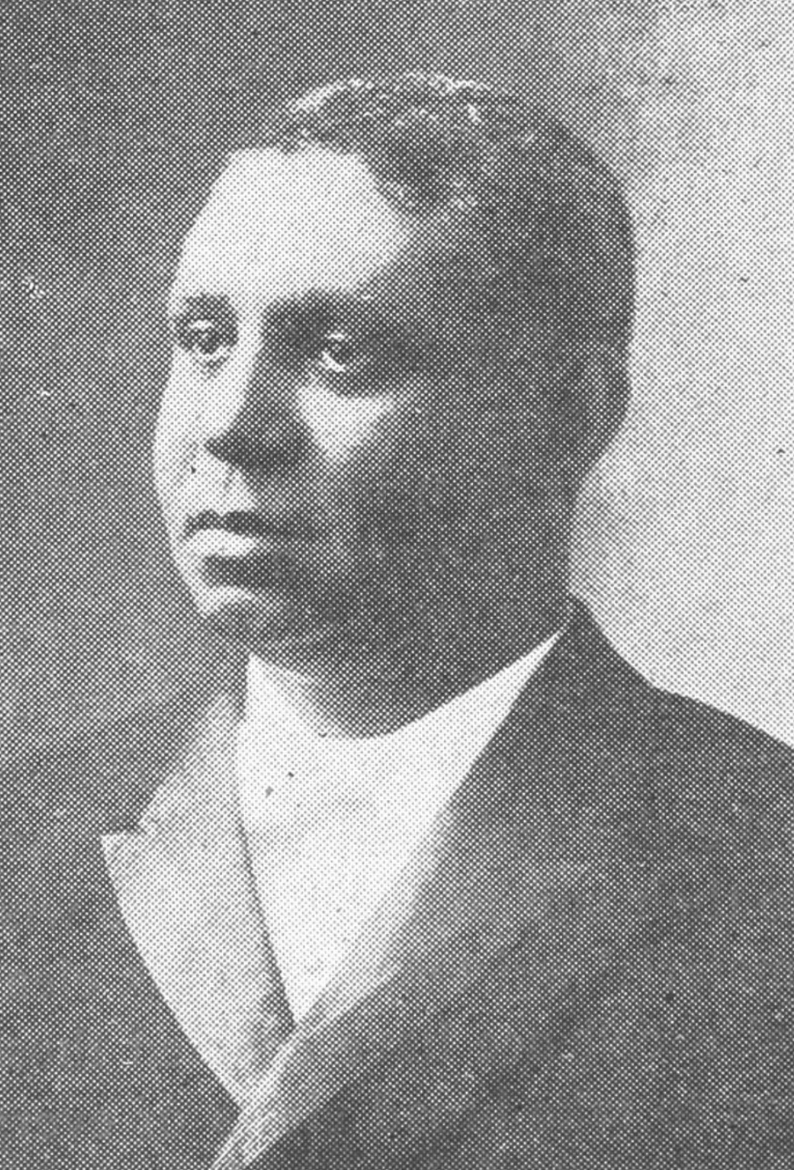
Rev. Moses W. D. Norman (c. 1913)

Rev. Henry Bailey, with ten original members, founded the Fourth Baptist Church in 1864. According to John Wesley Cromwell, the Fourth Baptist Church of Washington D.C., later renamed the Metropolitan Baptist Church, was organized under the guidance of the First Colored Baptist Church of Washington, D.C. which was later renamed the Nineteenth Street Baptist Church. The Metropolitan Baptist Church was located across the street from Camp Barker, which housed a Quaker-run Civil War "contraband" barracks in the Shaw community of Washington, D.C. (then called "Hell's Bottom). It was here, within "Hell's Bottom, that Reverend Bailey and the founders of the Metropolitan Baptist Church began to minister to some 4,000 newly freed slaves.

Metropolitan holds the distinction of having had only six pastors in its history since 1864: Rev. Henry Bailey (1864–1870); Rev. Robert Johnson (1870–1903); Rev. Moses W. D. Norman (1905–1926); Rev. Earnest Clarence Smith (1928–1977); Rev. H. Beecher Hicks Jr. (1977–2014); Rev. Maurice Watson (2015–2022); and George L. Parks Jr. (2023–present).

Metropolitan's pastor-emeritus, H. Beecher Hicks, Jr., was named one of America's greatest black preachers by Ebony magazine in 1993. The church also has a music and arts ministry that is staffed with Richard Smallwood, artist-in-residence.

Maurice Watson was installed as the sixth pastor of Metropolitan Baptist Church on April 12, 2015. Watson also has a dynamic itinerant preaching ministry that extends across the continent and globe.

George L. Parks Jr., was installed as Metropolitan's seventh pastor on October 28, 2023. His forward thinking, preaching prowess, bold approaches to worship and ministry are positioning Metropolitan for ministry in a brand new way.
