= List of monument and memorial controversies in the United States =

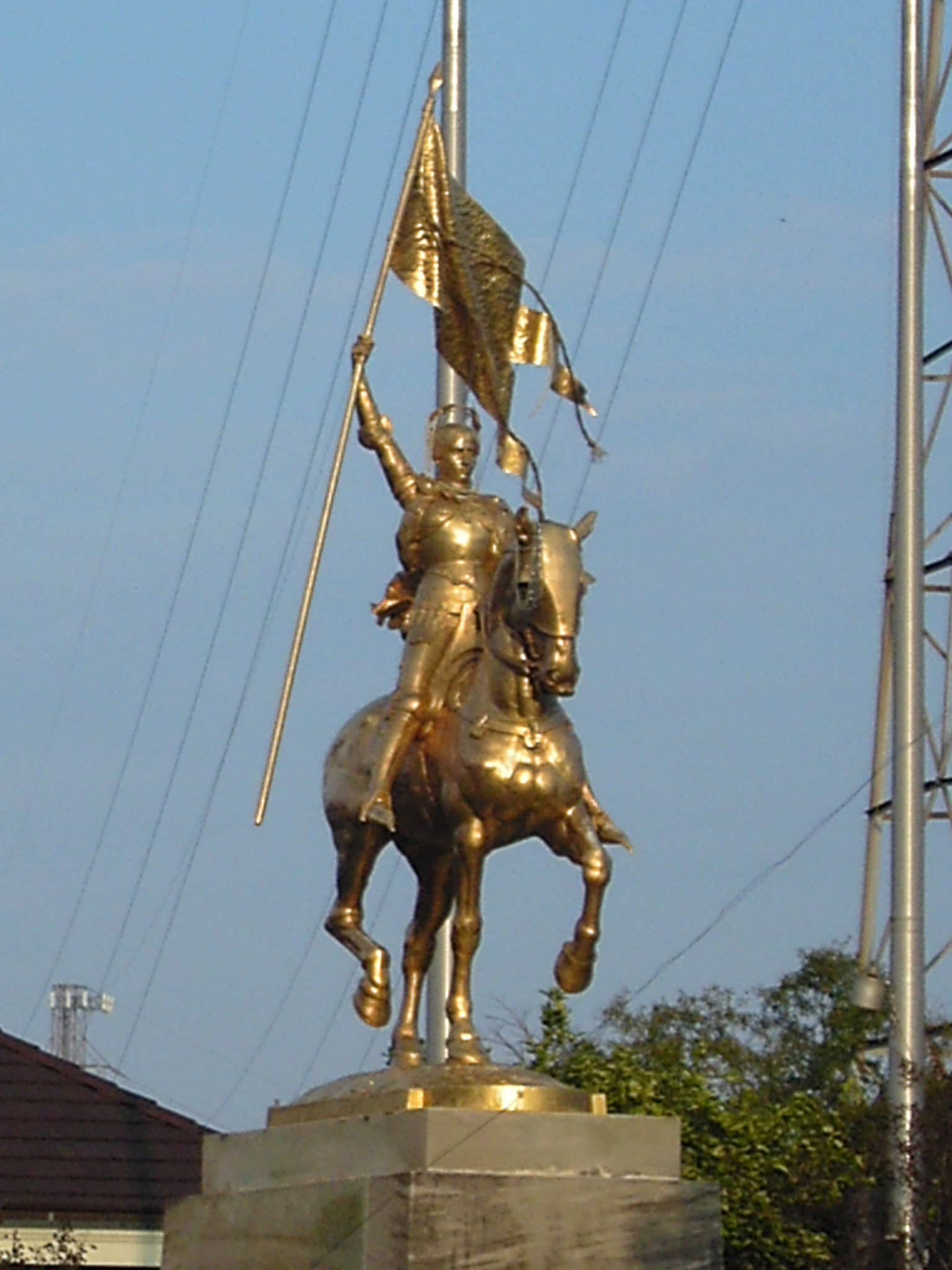
The Joan of Arc statue in the French Quarter of New Orleans prior to its defacement

The following is a list of monument and memorial controversies in the United States excluding those dealing with the Confederate States of America.

The first section is a chronological arrangement of monuments and memorials on which some action has already taken place, such as removal, defacement, and destruction. The final section is arranged alphabetically by state, and includes proposals bearing no action, authorized or not.

== Action taken ==
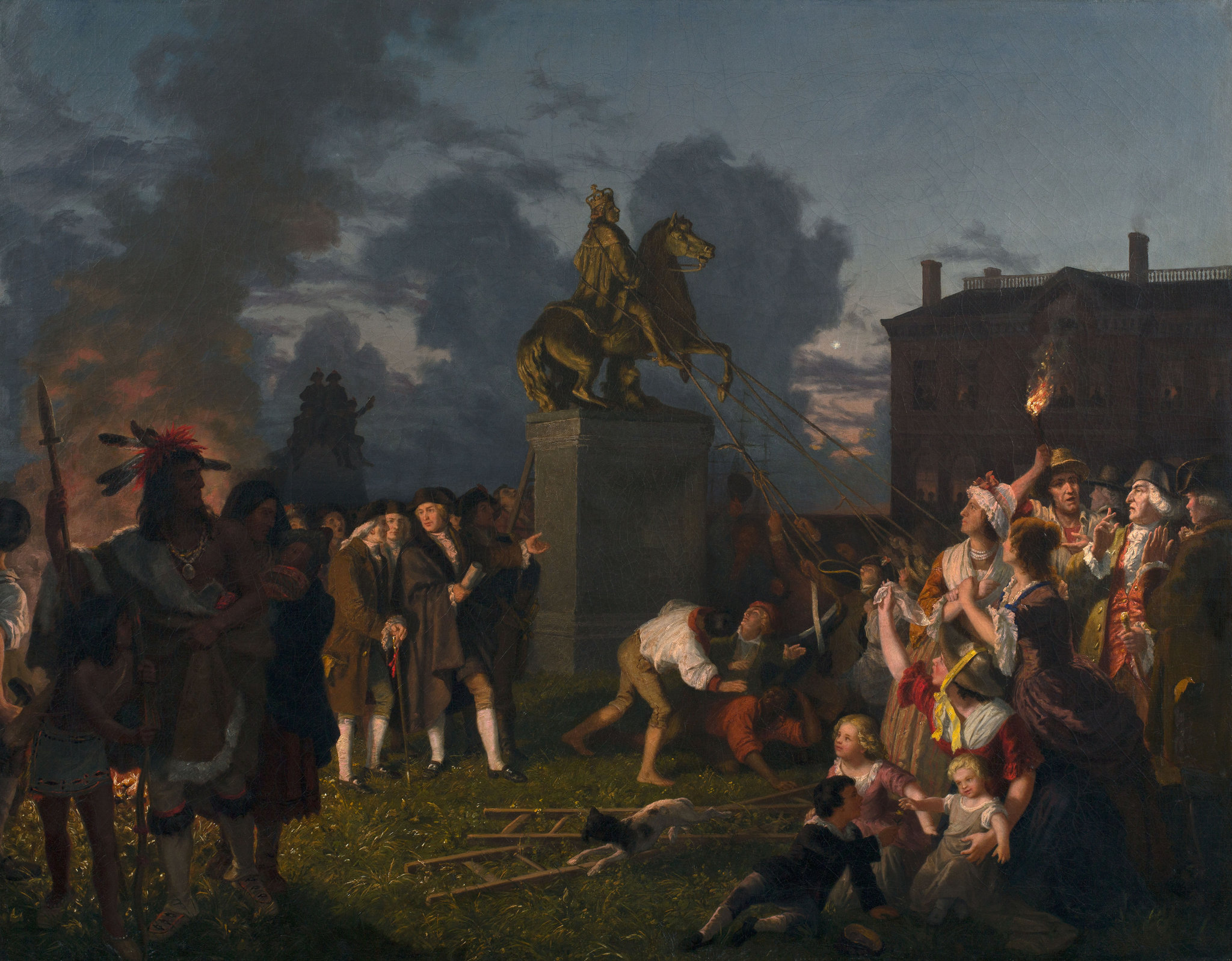
Pulling Down the Statue of King George III, painting c. 1859

Statue of William Pitt (1770)

The first monumental statue in what was to become the United States of America was a sculpture of William Pitt erected at the corner of Meeting and Broad streets in Civic Square in Charleston, SC on July 5, 1770. The South Carolina Assembly had voted to erect the statue after Pitt's role in repealing the stamp act. The standing statue was carved in London by Jooseph Wilton and depicts Pitt in a Classical oratory pose holding Magna Carta.

=== Statue of King George III (1776) ===
One month later, an equestrian statue of King George III was erected. It was executed by the British sculptor Joseph Wilton. Commissioned in 1764 and cast in lead covered with gold leaf, the Neoclassical statue showed King George dressed in Roman garb astride a horse, the whole effect being reminiscent of the Marcus Aurelius statue in Rome. It was set up on a tall pedestal in Bowling Green Park in New York City and dedicated in August 1770.

The following month another statue by Wilton, this one of William Pitt, a British politician very popular in the Americas for being responsible for the repeal of the much-hated Stamp Act of 1765 was erected. As with the King George statue, Pitt is portrayed in Roman clothes and was also located in New York.

On July 9, 1776, the Declaration of Independence was first read in New York City, and to celebrate it a group of patriots pulled down the King's statue, and eventually melted it down to make bullets with which to fight the British. When British troops arrived in November of that year they retaliated by destroying the Pitt statue.

=== Haymarket statues (1900) ===
The Haymarket affair statues. On May 3, 1886 police in Chicago, feeling threatened by a crowd, fired into it, killing six people. A rally was called the next day, held near Haymarket Square at which time an unknown person threw a bomb into a group of policemen, killing eight. Although it was never learned who threw the bomb, eight labor leaders were arrested, all were tried and found guilty and, after one committed suicide the day before he was to be executed, four others were hanged. Several years later, after winning an 1887 competition, a monument by Johannes Gelert portraying a "robust policeman, in his countenance frank, kind, and resolute", was created. On the base were the words "In the name of the people of Illinois I command peace" though a reporter at the event had the policeman saying, "In the name of the law I command you to disperse." The monument, a policeman standing with his arm upraised, for which the sculptor had used a policeman directing traffic as his inspiration, was dedicated May 30, 1889. At the dedication the Mayor of Chicago, DeWitt Cregier, had said, "May it stand here unblemished so long as the metropolis shall endure". In 1900, after it had been frequently vandalized and defaced and "unmistakable traces" of an attempt to blow it up were discovered, the statue was moved to near Randolph and Ogden streets in Union Park. On May 4, 1927, on the forty-first anniversary of the Haymarket affair, a "streetcar traveling at full speed jumped the tracks and rammed the statue". The monument was moved again, further into the park. In October 1969 and again exactly one year later attempts were made to blow up the statue. Chicago Mayor Richard Daley placed the statue under 24-hour police guard. In 1972 the statue was moved into the Central Police Headquarters, and then moved again in 1976 into the garden of the Police Training center.

In 1893 the Haymarket Martyrs' Monument by Albert Weinert was unveiled in the German Waldheim Cemetery, where the four men executed, August Spies, Adolph Fischer, Albert Parsons, and George Engel, and Louis Lingg who committed suicide the day before the hanging, are buried.

On September 14, 2004, another monument was unveiled, this one by Mary Brogger. Historian Kara Kvaran quotes Chicago city historian Tim Samuelson as saying, "The unifying theme is it's a tragedy – a human tragedy of people under difficult circumstances reacting to something beyond their control."

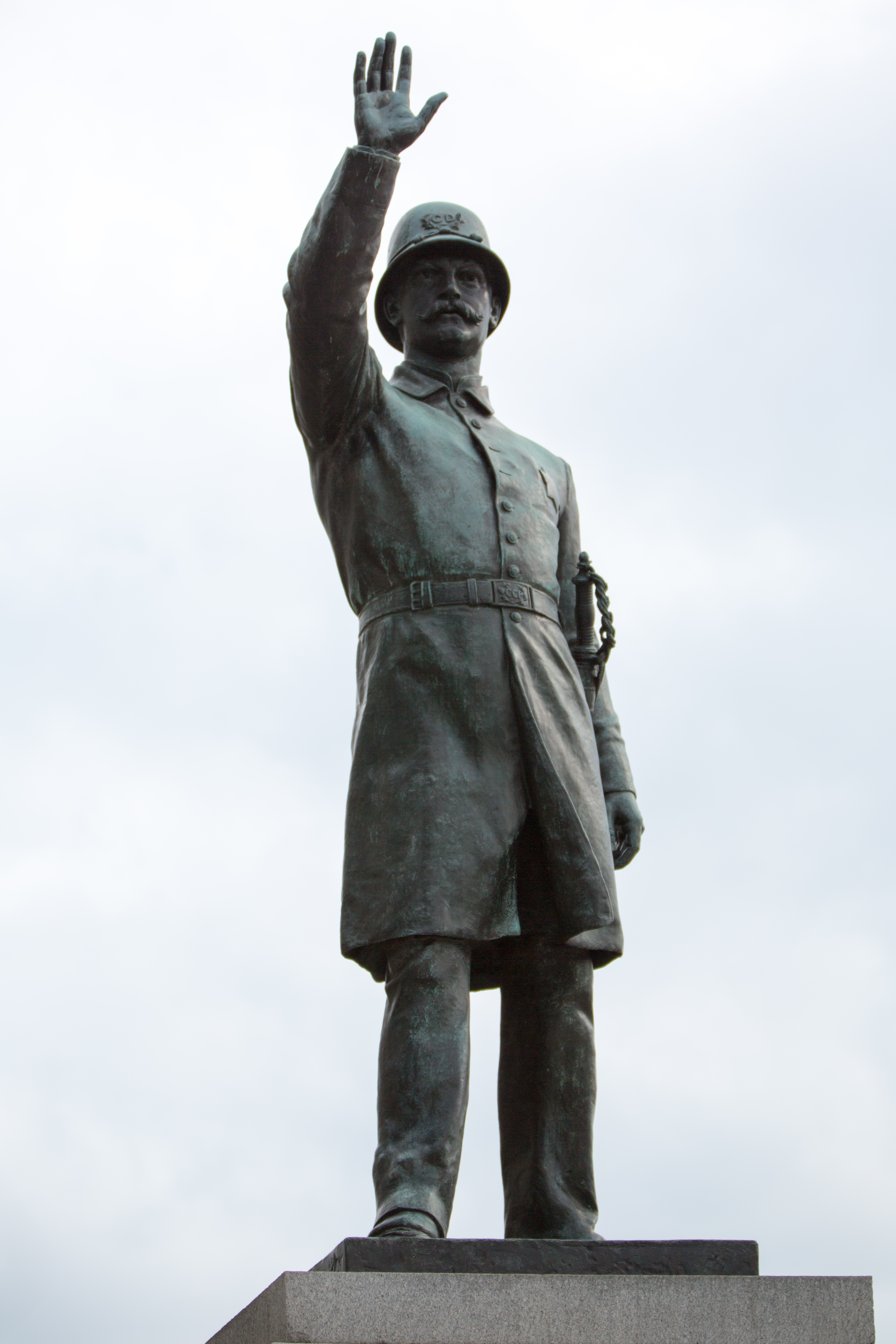
Police memorial

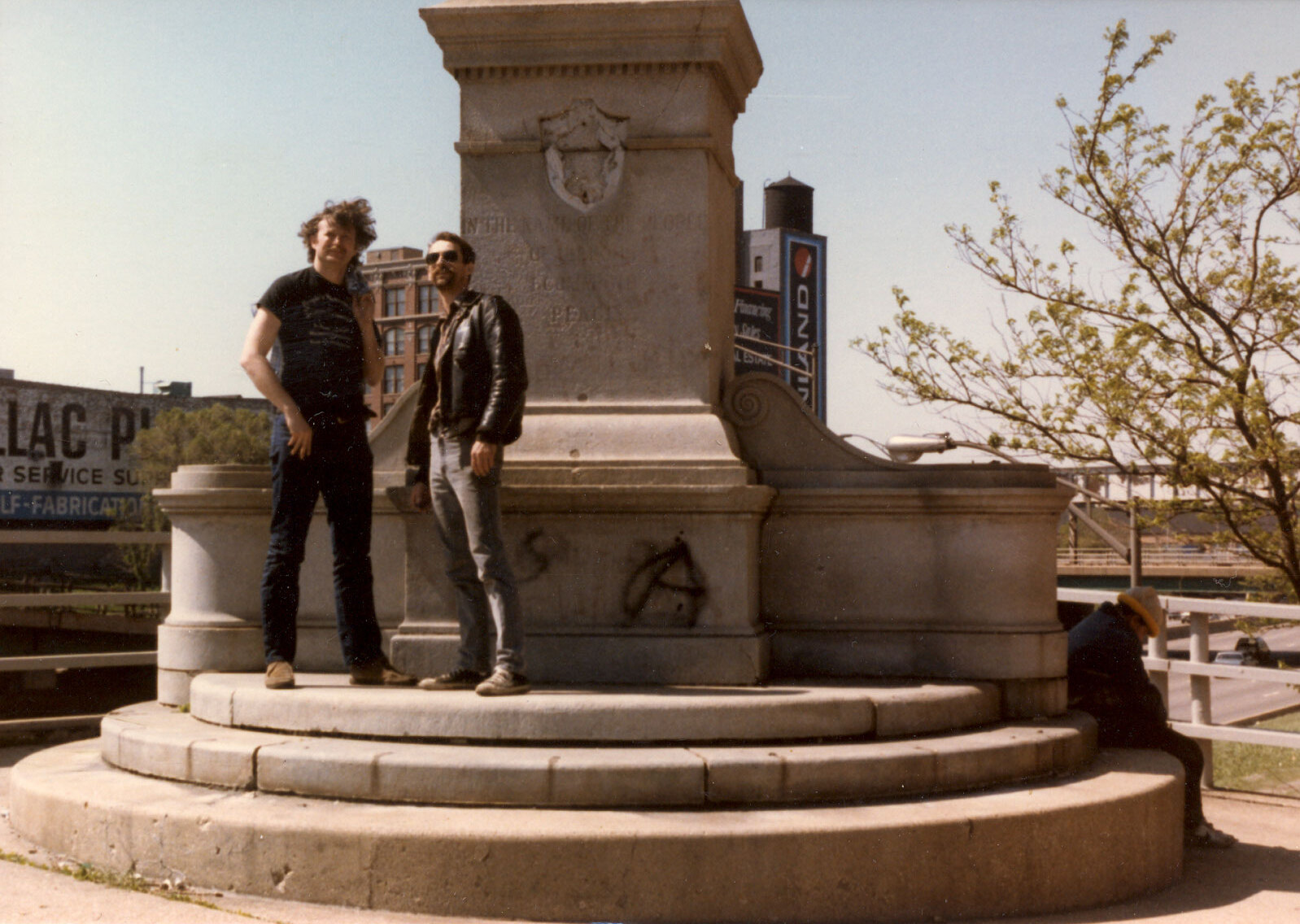
The statue-less pedestal of the police monument on the 100th anniversary of the Haymarket affair in May 1986; the pedestal has since been removed.

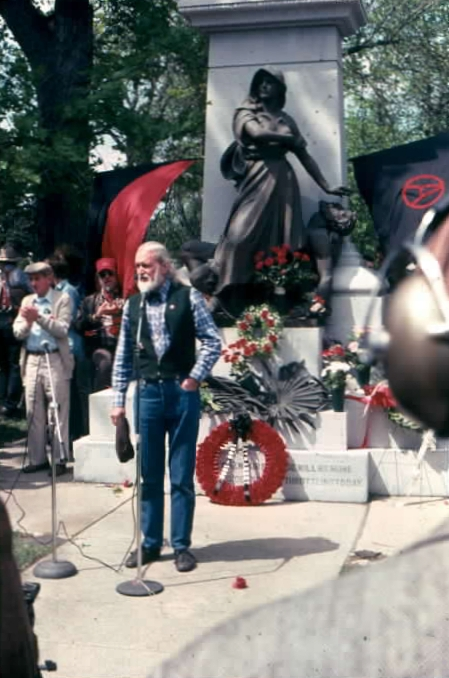
Utah Philips at the Haymarket Martyrs' Monument on the 100th anniversary of the Haymarket affair

=== Sacco and Vanzetti sculpture ===
Anarchists Sacco and Vanzetti were executed in 1927 after a great deal of controversy over the fairness of their trial and conviction. In 1928, a bas relief of them by Gutzon Borglum (sculptor of Mount Rushmore) was presented to the city of Boston. "The sculpture was never installed in the building it was intended for and, through the years, was rejected by one city or state official after another. Over time, the original bronze sculpture was lost, but a plaster mold was recovered." In 1997, 70 years later, the city finally accepted the sculpture. But a new casting from the mold has not been made, and it sits in storage at the Boston Public Library.

=== Pioneer Woman's Statue ===
By October 1936, plans for a Pioneer Woman statue to be placed at the Texas Woman's University (TWU) in Denton, Texas, were moving forward by "inviting a group of leading American sculptors, about 80 in number, to submit photographs of their work and from this group several sculptors are to be chosen who will be required to submit models of the proposed statue to the Centennial Commission of Control and if the first model submitted is not acceptable other models will be submitted until an accepted group is submitted."

Among the artists who entered the competition was the Texas sculptor Waldine Tauch, who had entered seven different competitions conducted by the Commission. She was to win three of them (memorials to Moses Austin, Isaac and Frances Van Zandt and First Shot Fired For Texas Independence monument) but she was not able to win the Pioneer Woman statue.

It is not yet clear how many plaster models were submitted, but a "jury of professionals" unanimously chose the one submitted by William Zorach, a sculptor from New York. It includes not just a pioneer woman, nor a woman and child as does Tauch's model, but an entire family of mother, father, son, and daughter—all nude. Nudity was seen, by some, as being appropriate for Classical, allegorical, or symbolical portrayals but was unacceptable for Texas pioneer women. Upon learning of the commission's decision, Tauch "wasted no time telephoning and writing letters to many friends throughout the state to report the incident".

"Anguished protests from Texans swelled into a controversy dwarfing all previous ones (in Zorach's career). One astute observer noted the woman had no wedding ring .... while a chapter of the Daughters of the Republic of Texas declared it, 'the greatest insult that could be offered to these women who believed and practiced the virtue of modesty'." Zorach wrote "The newspapers said that if a Texas pioneer had gone around in such a state of nudity he would have been strung to the nearest tree. ... Gutzon Borglum was down there at the time and I was told that he said my figures looked like a bunch of apes", a remark that was widely quoted by opponents of the statue at the time. Eventually the commission was turned over to sculptor Leo Friedlander, who had not even entered the competition. He, along with the Piccirilli Brothers carvers, executed the work.

=== Bust of United States Senator Joseph McCarthy ===
United States Senator Joseph McCarthy of Wisconsin (1908–1957) served as a Wisconsin Circuit Court judge prior to his election to the United States Senate. In 1959, a bust of Joseph McCarthy was dedicated at the Outagamie County Justice Center in Appleton, Wisconsin. Outagamie County officials discussed removing the bust from the justice center in 1986 and again in 1991. In 2001, the McCarthy bust was sent to the History Museum at the Castle in Appleton, Wisconsin. The bust is part of an exhibit about Joseph McCarthy at the museum.

=== The Races of Mankind (1969) ===
The Races of Mankind is a series of 104 sculptures created for the Field Museum of Natural History in Chicago by sculptor Malvina Hoffman, representing the various races of humankind, and unveiled in 1933. Most of the sculptures are life-sized. The works were initially housed in Hall 3, the Chauncey Keep Memorial Hall ("The Hall of the Races of Mankind"). In the 1960s such a portrayal of race became viewed negatively, as racist, and in February 1969 the Hall was dismantled and the statues were either spread around the museum or placed in storage. The museum stated that the Hall was "scientifically indefensible and socially objectionable". The Field Museum had previously allowed the Hammond World Atlas Corporation to use pictures of the statues in its Hammond's March of Civilization; A Historical Atlas." This permission was withdrawn in the late 1960s or early 1970s because it contained "outdated historical, linguistic and racial data".

=== Vietnam Veteran's Memorial ===
Vietnam Veterans Memorial. In the late 1970s a group was formed to create a memorial to the American veterans of the Vietnam War. A site for the memorial was approved unanimously by the U.S. Senate on June 30, 1980. Shortly thereafter a competition to design the memorial, which had to include the names of all Americans killed in the war or were still missing. The anonymous competition drew the largest number of submissions ever, 1,141, for such a competition in the United States. Shortly after the winner, Ohio native Maya Lin, a twenty-year-old female student of Chinese descent, was announced, "The debate became increasingly bitter, threatening to end the project." The monument was said to look like "a black gash of shame". "Lin maintains, entirely accurately, that there's no way her design would have been chosen if candidates had been identified by name."

In 1984 the concern was resolved by adding Frederick Hart's bronze statue The Three Soldiers near the Memorial.

Bill Moyers, in an interview with Lin, stated, "'Course the bigotry and the hatred and the racism did not have the last word. The monument was the last word."

The monument is now the most frequently visited memorial in Washington D.C.

=== Captain John Mason and the Pequot massacre (1996) ===
In 1996, an 1889 statue of Captain John Mason was removed from the intersection of Pequot Avenue and Clift Street in Mystic, Connecticut at the request of the Pequot Tribal Council. Mason led the Pequot massacre of 1637. The plaque on the statue was removed and given to the Mystic Historical Society. The statue itself was relocated to Palisado Green in Windsor, Connecticut (41°51′29″N 72°38′11″W), which is where John Mason lived at the time of the Pequot War. A new plaque was made, without mention of the Pequots. In 1859, a Founders Monument, containing a statue of Mason and the names of the 38 original settlers of Norwich, Connecticut, was erected at the original burial grounds at Bean Hill in Norwich. This monument is also referred to as the Mason Monument.

There is a life-sized stone carving of Major John Mason on the Connecticut State Capitol building, as he was a preeminent founder of the Colony.

=== Juan de Oñate (1997) ===
The right foot of a bronze statue of Juan de Oñate at the Northern Rio Grande National Heritage Center (until 2017 the Oñate Monument and Visitor Center) in Alcalde, New Mexico was cut off on December 29, 1997. (Oñate cut off or ordered cut off the right foot of Acoma Native Americans; he was convicted of excessive cruelty and banished for life from New Mexico.) It has since been repaired by the artist, at a taxpayer cost of $10,000, but there is a seam. The unidentified possessor of the original foot spoke, 20 years later, with a local filmmaker, Chris Eyre, about the affair, and said he had melted part of the foot down "to make medallions for Pueblo leaders." Eyre is working on a documentary about the incident "and what it reveals about racism in New Mexico."

In 2017, the statue's left foot was painted red and the words "Remember 1680" — the year of the Pueblo Revolt — were written on the monument's wall.

=== Ludlow Monument (2003) ===
The Ludlow Monument, located near the site of the Ludlow Massacre (Ludlow, Colorado) had its figures decapitated in 2003. The figures were restored in 2005.

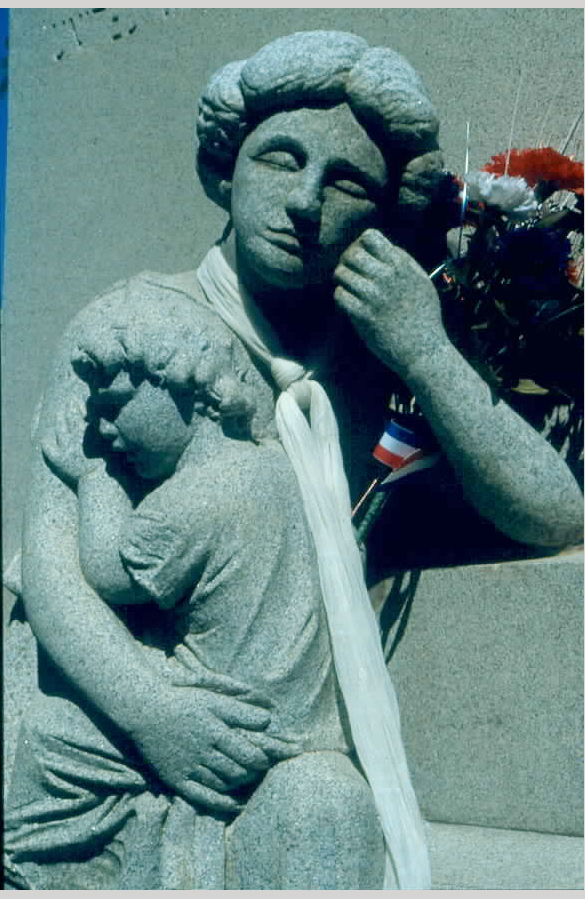
Repaired Ludlow Monument showing scarf covering scar

=== Civic Virtue (2011) ===
Civic Virtue Triumphant Over Unrighteousness is an immense statue, designed by Frederick MacMonnies, featuring a naked, hulking man, representing virtue, standing atop nude female figures, representing vice. It was installed in City Hall Park, Manhattan, in 1922. Protests began even before the unveiling. In 1941 it was moved to Queens Boulevard in front of the Queens Borough Hall. In 2012 it was moved to Green-Wood Cemetery in Brooklyn.

=== Ten Commandments ===
The display of the Ten Commandments on public property has been controversial as a perceived violation of the Establishment Clause. The US Supreme Court ruled in favor of such monuments in 2005's Van Orden v. Perry. In 2009, Oklahoma State Representative Mike Ritze sponsored a bill to have a monument to the Ten Commandments installed at the capitol. His family supplied $10,000 to fund the monument, which was installed in late 2012. The monument since has been labeled "a lightning rod of controversy". It has been destroyed and re-erected once, and been the subject of both state and federal litigation. In June 2017 a monument with the Ten Commandments carved on it, that had been "plagued with controversy," was knocked down by a car and destroyed within 24 hours of being erected on the Arkansas State Capitol grounds. A Ten Commandments monument, placed "to recognize important documents that influenced the governing of the city," was ordered removed from Bloomfield City Hall in Bloomfield, New Mexico by the courts. The US Supreme Court refused to hear the case (grant certiorari) in 2017.

=== Squaw Peak (2013) ===
The US Board on Geographic Names changed Squaw Peak in Phoenix, Arizona to Piestewa Peak, after Lori Ann Piestewa, the first Native American woman to die in combat serving in the US military.

=== Statue of Tom Watson removed (2013) ===
A statue of Tom Watson (U.S. Senator) removed from the Georgia Capitol steps, 2013. He used magazines and newspapers which he owned to launch attacks against blacks, Jews, and Catholics.

=== Charles Aycock buildings renamed (2014 and 2015) ===
Both Duke University (2014) and East Carolina University (2015) each renamed a building which bore the name of white supremacist Governor Charles Aycock.

=== Junípero Serra (2015) ===
In 2015, immediately after his canonization, the statue of Saint Junípero Serra at California's Carmel Mission was defaced with paint, as were surrounding graves and a basilica; Carmel's Police Sergeant Luke Powell said that the vandalism is being investigated as a hate crime because the perpetrators targeted "specifically the headstones of people of European descent, and not Native American descent." Another statue of Serra in Monterey, California was decapitated the same year; its head was rediscovered and reattached months later. A third statue of Serra is set to be removed and replaced as of September 2017 from the Santa Barbara Mission after being decapitated and doused in red paint that month. In August, 2017, a statue "was splashed with red paint and defaced with the word 'murderer' in white".

Stanford University announced in 2018 "that it would rename several buildings memorializing Junipero Serra.... Stanford eliminated its own Indian mascot in the 1970s over concerns of insensitive cultural appropriation."

=== Byrd Stadium (2015) ===
The stadium at the University of Maryland, College Park was named for Harry Clifton "Curley" Byrd, University President 1936–1954. According to a coalition of student groups, which requested the stadium be renamed, Byrd was "a racist and a segregationist", and "he barred blacks from participating in sports and enrolling into the University until 1951." In 2015 the board of regents of the university voted to change the name to Maryland Stadium.

=== Seal of the Harvard Law School (2016) ===
Isaac Royall, Jr. (1719–1781), the biggest slave-owner in Massachusetts, left land to Harvard College, and the Harvard Law School, which was founded in part based on this bequest, included Royall's coat of arms in its seal. Responding to student pressure, because of Royall's brutal treatment of slaves (77 were burned alive in Antigua), the school decided in 2016 to design a new seal.

=== Woodrow Wilson (2016, 2020, and 2021) ===
In April 2016, Princeton University decided to remove its mural of President Woodrow Wilson, "in response to concerns protesters raised this fall about the former president's segregationist views." The university also removed Wilson's name from its School of Public and International Affairs and a residential college in 2020.

Inspired by the changes at Princeton, residents of Washington, D.C. also proposed changing the name of Woodrow Wilson High School. According to proponents of name change, "the community in Northwest Washington has to acknowledge that the federal government — after Wilson left office — uprooted established black communities to create the upper-income, largely white enclave it is today. Organizers of the latest movement to change the school's name want the school to honor the neighborhood's black community, not someone whose policies laid the groundwork for dismantling it." In 2021, Lewis D. Ferbee, the chancellor of the D.C. school system, proposed renaming the school for playwright August Wilson. Later that year, however, the school was renamed Jackson-Reed High School. The name honors Edna Jackson, the school's first African American teacher, and Vincent Reed, its first Black principal.

=== Andrew Jackson on $20 bill (2016) ===
In 2016, the U.S. Treasury Secretary Jack Lew announced that the image of Andrew Jackson on the $20 bill would be replaced with an image of Harriet Tubman. "'Where Jackson represented the worst side of American history, Tubman represents the best ideals of American democracy,' said Kari Winter, a professor who studies slavery and dissent at the University at Buffalo." However, as of 2025, no action has yet been taken to implement the decision.

=== Harney Peak (2016) ===
In 2016, the US Board on Geographic Names approved changing the name of Harney Peak, a mountain in South Dakota named after the US army general William S. Harney, who led troops in an 1855 battle against the Brulé Sioux and killed women and children as well as warriors. Its new title is Black Elk Peak, for a man believed to be a survivor of the battle.

=== Christopher Columbus (2017) ===
In August 2017, the 1792 monument to Christopher Columbus in Baltimore, the oldest in the United States, was destroyed by a sledgehammer, and the perpetrators posted a video online of themselves destroying it. Holding signs in the video saying "The future is racial and economic justice" and "Racism: Tear it down," the narrator said that "Christopher Columbus symbolizes the initial invasion of European capitalism into the Western Hemisphere. Columbus initiated a centuries-old wave of terrorism, murder, genocide, rape, slavery, ecological degradation and capitalist exploitation of labor in the Americas."

The monument to Christopher Columbus in New York City's Columbus Circle, whose hands were defaced with red paint on September 12, 2017. It was placed under police guard. The Speaker of the City Council, Melissa Mark-Viverito, has suggested its removal because "Columbus's journeys to the Western Hemisphere led to the genocide of native peoples." In January 2018 de Blasio announced that based on a recommendation of a special commission after public hearings, it will not be moved.

Also in September, 2017, the hands of a statue of Columbus in New York City's Central Park were covered with red paint, and the hashtag #somethingscoming and "Hate will not be tolerated" were written on the pedestal.

A statue of Columbus in Yonkers, New York was decapitated.

=== Thomas Jefferson (2017) ===
Thomas Jefferson statue at the University of Virginia (which he founded), was shrouded in black by student protesters; University President Teresa A. Sullivan opposed the students' actions and the shroud was removed.

=== Calhoun College (2017) ===
Calhoun College at Yale (now Grace Hopper College) was named for John C. Calhoun, a politician and pro-slavery advocate who died in 1850. It was renamed for computer scientist Grace Hopper July 1, 2017.

=== Francis Scott Key (2017) ===
The Francis Scott Key Monument in Bolton Hill, Baltimore, was spray-painted with the phrase "Racist Anthem" and defaced with red paint; Baltimore mayor Catherine Pugh said that she has no plans to remove the monument. (See U.S. national anthem protests.)

=== Colonel William Crawford (2017) ===
A statue of American Revolution Colonel William Crawford outside of the Crawford County Courthouse (Ohio) was decapitated in August 2017; the city's Attorney Joel Spitzer offered $1,000 for any information that leads to the arrest of the vandal.

=== Charging Bull statue (New York) (2017) ===
Wall Street's Charging Bull statue was doused with blue paint while the neighboring Fearless Girl statue had a sash draped over it reading "Draw the blue line"; police believe this to be a reference to the Paris climate accord. The paint and sash have been removed.

=== Joan of Arc (2017) ===
The statue of Joan of Arc, in the French Quarter of New Orleans, was painted with the words "Tear it Down" in early 2017.

=== Abraham Lincoln (2017 and 2020) ===
In August, 2017, a bust of Abraham Lincoln in West Englewood, Chicago, was spray-painted black and later covered in tar and set on fire.

A statue of a freed slave kneeling at the feet of Abraham Lincoln was removed from downtown Boston on December 29, 2020. Critics said it downplays the role African Americans had in the Civil War. The Boston statue, created by Thomas Ball, is a replica of the original Emancipation Memorial in Washington, DC. Delegate Eleanor Holmes Norton (D-DC) has introduced legislation to remove that statue from the city′s Lincoln Park.

=== James Vardaman (2017) ===
Vardaman Hall at the University of Mississippi, named for James K. Vardaman, a racist and white supremacist who was Governor of and Senator from Mississippi, was renamed in 2017. However, as of June, 2020, the name Vardaman has not been removed from the building.

=== Napoleon Bonaparte Broward (2017) ===
A statue of "racist" Napoleon Bonaparte Broward, for whom the county is named, was removed from the courthouse in Broward County, Florida in 2017. Broward, Governor of Florida 1905–1909, was "an unapologetic segregationist." It was installed in 1993 after being donated by its sculptor, "who had no place to keep the large artwork."

A local lawyer found his racist remarks in documents only recently (2011) posted online, and posted them on a county blog September 21, 2017. The County Mayor said she would be receptive to attempts to rename the county, although she said shortly afterward that "we're not considering that at this time" and "I don't even want to go down that road."

The statue was removed during the night of October 18–19, 2017, and placed in storage.

=== J. Marion Sims (2017) ===
J. Marion Sims, a physician called "the father of modern gynecology", performed experiments on slave women and children, up to 30 times on one woman, without anesthesia (at the time, anesthesia had only recently been invented, and was not in widespread use), "under the racist belief that black patients did not feel pain the same way as their white counterparts". In August, 2017, a statue of him in New York's Central Park, at Fifth Avenue and 103 St., opposite the New York Academy of Medicine (which twice called for its removal), was defaced with the word "Racist", and women wearing bloodied hospital gowns staged a protest. An editorial in the journal Nature, opposing the removal as "whitewashing history," generated "outrage." Alan Singer, a professor at Hofstra University, called him "the American equivalent of Josef Mengele." The inscription at the monument reads:

Surgeon & philanthropist founder of the Women's Hospital, State of New York his brilliant achievement carried the fame of American surgery throughout the world. Born 1814

J. Marion Sims. M.D. L.L.D.

In recognition of his services in the cause of science & mankind awarded the highest honors by his countrymen & decorations from the governments of Belgium France – Italy – Spain & Portugal Died 1883

In January, 2018, mayor Bill de Blasio announced that the statue would be moved to Green-Wood Cemetery in Brooklyn, where he is buried. The statue was removed from Central Park on April 17, 2018. As of July 2022, it has not yet been re-erected in its new location.

Another statue of Sims is on the grounds of the South Carolina State House. The mayor of Columbia, Stephen K. Benjamin, has called for its removal, as have other protestors. A statue of Sims also stands on the capitol grounds in Montgomery, Alabama; in April 2018 (when Silent Sam was doused with red ink and blood) the statue had ketchup thrown on it while a skit about Sims was performed. In 2005, a painting entitled 'Medical Giants of Alabama' that depicted Sims and other white men standing over a partially clothed black patient was removed from the University of Alabama at Birmingham's Center for Advanced Medical Studies because of complaints from people offended by it."

=== Roger B. Taney (2017) ===
Two sculptures in Baltimore and in Annapolis. As Chief Justice of the United States, Taney delivered the majority opinion in the Dred Scott v. Sanford case. Governor Larry Hogan called for the removal of the Annapolis statue. On August 16, 2017, a majority of the members of the Maryland State House Trust voted to move the Annapolis statue from the State House grounds to storage. It was removed on August 18, 2017. The Baltimore statue was removed by the City of Baltimore on August 18, 2017 and taken into storage.

=== William McKinley (2018) ===
The city council of Arcata, California voted in February 2018 to have the city's statue of William McKinley removed. (See Hawaii, below.)

=== Stephen Foster (2018) ===
The city of Pittsburgh decided to remove a statue of the composer Stephen Foster from its prominent place at the entrance to Schenley Park. "Commissioned in 1900 by Andrew Mellon and other wealthy industrialists, the sculpture depicts Foster sitting high above a black man who is positioned sycophantically playing the banjo at his feet."

=== Eugene Talmadge (2018) ===
"After asking the Legislature and Gov. Nathan Deal to consider its request to rename the Talmadge Bridge, the port city (Savannah, Georgia) put up signs last month [June, 2018] that refer to the span as the "Savannah Bridge". While the name change is not official, the city decided to take matters into its own hands after the state did not act. The late Eugene Talmadge, a Georgia governor, was a staunch segregationist."

=== Parran Hall (2018) ===
On June 29, 2018, the University of Pittsburgh's board of trustees unanimously voted to remove Parran's name from the building over the controversy of Parran's role in the Tuskegee and Guatemala syphilis experiments which occurred while he served as U.S. Surgeon General. The structure is now known simply as the Public Health Building.

=== Early Days (2018) ===
The statue Early Days (1894), in San Francisco, California, depicted "a Native American on his back, defeated, a Catholic priest above him pointing to the heavens, and an anglicized vaquero bestriding the scene in triumph. The statue is part of the Pioneer Monument celebrating the state’s origins." Native Americans found it ethnically offensive as well as inaccurate. ("The Native American depicted in Early Days, for example, was from the Plains but native people of the Bay Area were Ohlone.") Objections to the statue went back "decades". According to a report from the San Francisco Arts Commission, "At the core of the repeated requests for removal is the allegorical sculpture's depiction of the degradation and genocide of Native American peoples, utilizing visual stereotypes common at the turn of the twentieth century to depict all Native Americans which are now universally viewed as disrespectful, misleading, and racist." A "contextualizing plaque" was added in 1994, but its language was itself contentious and viewed by some as offensive. ("Political pressure resulted in language that reeked of false objectivity.") It was vandalized with red paint. The statue was removed in the middle of the night of September 13–14, 2018.

=== Prospector Pete (2018) ===
The decision to remove Prospector Pete, a statue at California State University, Long Beach, was made in 2018 "after years of activism and a formal committee inquiry.... The cartoonish Prospector Pete costume mascot used at athletic games, which has been slowly phased out in recent years, will also be formally retired." According to Jane Conoley, President of the university, "We came to know that the 1849 California gold rush was a time in history when the indigenous peoples of California endured subjugation, violence and threats of genocide."

=== Orr Elementary School (2018) ===
Benjamin Orr Elementary School in Southeast Washington, D.C., which opened as an all-white school but in the 2016–17 school year was "97 percent black, 2 percent Hispanic and zero percent white," was named for him until 2018 when the predominantly black student body at Orr Elementary discovered the school was named for a slave owner, and decided to rename the school for Lawrence E. Boone, the school's African-American principal from 1973 to 1996. The vote of the D.C. Council to change the name was unanimous.

=== SUNY New Paltz (2019) ===
Six buildings (five dormitories and a dining hall) are named for the six Huguenot founders of the town of New Paltz, all of them slave owners. In February 2019, the College Council, in a 4–3 vote, decided to rename them for native Americans.

=== Columbus murals (2019) ===
Columbus Coming Ashore, by Luis Gregori, mural at the University of Notre Dame

The president of the University of Notre Dame announced in January, 2019, that the school will cover the Columbus murals, a series of twelve 19th-century murals by Luigi Gregori that "depict Native Americans in stereotypical submissive poses before white European explorers.... [T]hey will be covered, although they still could be occasionally displayed. A permanent display of photos of the paintings will be created elsewhere with an explanation of their context."

=== Goodloe Sutton (2019) ===
Goodloe Sutton, former editor of a small Alabama newspaper, has been removed from the journalism Hall of Fame of his alma mater, the University of Southern Mississippi, after he published in February 2019 an editorial calling for the Ku Klux Klan to lynch Democrats and centrist Republicans in Washington.

=== Fletcher Memorial Murals, Portland, Oregon (2020) ===
The W. T. Fletcher Memorial Murals are in the auditorium of Grant High School in Portland, Oregon. They were produced for the space by Carl Hoeckner, a member of the Works Progress Administration's Federal Art Project, and were dedicated in 1932. The murals depict a peaceful, harmonious, idealized first meeting between the Indigenous people of the area and European-descended white settlers. A planned restoration of these murals ignited opposition from many students at the school, including the Indigenous Peoples Student Union, who say the depictions are ahistorical and offensive, and they want the murals removed. The local school board will ultimately decide if the murals will be removed, covered or restored.

=== Mayor Frank Rizzo, Philadelphia, Pennsylvania (2020) ===
On June 3, 2020, the City of Philadelphia removed the statue of Mayor Frank Rizzo from its location at the entrance of the Municipal Services Building by Philadelphia City Hall. Rizzo served as Philadelphia Police Commissioner and later served two terms as mayor; he was accused of having been racist and bigoted.

On June 4, 2020, the business group associated with Philadelphia's Italian Market announced they would be removing the market's mural of Rizzo.

=== Nazi headstones (2020) ===
The headnotes of two gravestones of WWII German POWs marked with swastikas at the Fort Sam Houston National Cemetery in San Antonio, Texas, were replaced on December 24, 2020. The Military Religious Freedom Foundation had demanded their removal in May 2020, but the Veterans Administration (VA) resisted on the grounds that they were historical. The VA resisted until Senator Ted Cruz (R-TX) and Congressen Will Hurd (R-TX23) and Kay Granger (R-TX12) put pressure on them. The fate of a similar Nazi headstone at Fort Douglas cemetery in Utah is unknown.

=== John Marshall Law School (Chicago) (2021) ===
The University of Illinois Chicago School of Law was founded in 1899 as the John Marshall Law School and initially accredited by the American Bar Association in 1951. It merged with the University of Illinois at Chicago in 2019, becoming the UIC John Marshall Law School. On May 20, 2021, following review by a university task force, the school announced its official change of name to University of Illinois Chicago School of Law, effective July 1. The board of trustees acknowledged that "newly discovered research", uncovered by historian Paul Finkelman, had revealed that influential 19th century U.S. Supreme Court Chief Justice John Marshall was a slave trader and owner who practiced "pro-slavery jurisprudence", which was deemed inappropriate for the school's namesake.

=== Frank Bogert statue (2022) ===
As Mayor of Palm Springs, California in the mid-1960's, Frank Bogert was an advocate for the eviction of non-Native Americans from Section 14, a tract of land held by the Agua Caliente Band of Cahuilla Indians but leased to others. The city directed that the tribe terminate short-term leases granted to them and used city funds to clear the land for redevelopment, including burning the homes. The residents of Section 14 were mostly Black and Latino, and the State of California later called the displacement a "city-engineered holocaust", depriving dozens of Blacks and Latinos of generational wealth.

The Palm Springs Human Relations Commission cited this history, as well as a conflict of interest while Bogert acted as conservator for tribal land which was being demolished by the city, and racist comments regarding the "poor Blacks" who lived in Section 14, as justification for removing a statue of Bogert on horseback placed in 1990 in front of the Palm Springs City Hall. The City Council of Palm Springs ordered its removal in 2021 and formally apologized for the eviction of the Section 14 residents. After legal objections to its removal from Bogert's supporters and family members were rejected by the courts, the statue was relocated on July 13, 2022.

=== Cesar Chavez monuments and memorials (2026) ===
Cesar Chavez was a Mexican American labor leader and civil rights activist. Beginning in March 2026, following public allegations that he had sexually abused women and minors, various local and state governments and other organizations either removed or made plans to remove or modify various monuments honoring him.

== Action proposed ==
=== California ===
In 2018, the city of Osaka, Japan severed its sister city relationship with San Francisco over the latter's "comfort women" statue. The mayor of Osaka, Hirofumi Yoshimura, sent a 10-page letter to London Breed, San Francisco's mayor, complaining of historical inaccuracies and that the monument unfairly singled out Japan's use of women and ignored similar practices by other countries.

Zuckerberg San Francisco General Hospital, where Mark Zuckerberg's wife Priscilla Chan was a resident, bears their name because the couple in 2015 gave $75 million to it. Given the many scandals by and criticism of Facebook in 2017 and 2018, the removal of his name from the hospital has been proposed.

The Life of Washington murals by Victor Arnautoff at George Washington High School contain images of African-American slaves and slaughtered Native Americans. Extensive discussions and study have examined options about how to deal with them. On June 26, 2019, the San Francisco school board voted unanimously to paint over them. The decision was changed in August 2019 to cover the mural instead.

=== District of Columbia ===
- J. Edgar Hoover Building, the national headquarters of the FBI, because he was a "racist, anti-communist zealot who, in the name of God and the American flag, set out to destroy Martin Luther King Jr."
- On the former Italian embassy building at 16th and Fuller Sts. NW, now (2018) being developed as Mill Creek Residential luxury apartments, a workman uncovered an unknown plaque that had been defaced and then covered up. The building was built in 1925, three years after Mussolini took office. It contains fasci, symbols of Italian fascism. They had been smashed before the panel was covered up. The building now is a historic landmark, and the fate of the panel has not been decided.
- Senate majority leader Charles Schumer has called for the renaming of the Russell Senate Office Building, named for Georgia Senator Richard Russell Jr., a "notorious segregationist", with the name of recently deceased Senator John McCain.

=== Georgia ===
The Decatur, Georgia city council approved a resolution on December 21, 2020, to remove a cannon in the city's downtown that was erected by the United Daughters of the Confederacy in 1906 to commemorate the forceful removal of 20,000 Muscogee people in 1836. Actual removal of the monument depends on the DeKalb County council. A nearby 30-foot obelisk honoring the Confederacy was removed by a judge as a "public nuisance" in June 2020.

=== Hawaii ===
The monument to President William McKinley at McKinley High School in Honolulu, Hawaii (because "he led the takeover of Hawaii, Puerto Rico, Guam, the Philippines and Cuba").

=== Illinois ===
"In Chicago, a campaign is underway to remove a monument to Italo Balbo, an Italian air marshal, which the Fascist dictator Benito Mussolini presented to the city in 1933. Balbo Drive is a well-known street in the heart of downtown."

=== Louisiana ===
The statue of President Andrew Jackson in New Orleans' Jackson Square.

=== Massachusetts ===
"In Boston, there are calls for renaming historic Faneuil Hall because Peter Faneuil, who donated the building to the city in 1743, was a slave owner and trader."

=== Michigan ===
Kalamazoo: The Kalamazoo City Council voted in 2018 to remove the "Fountain of the Pioneers". It features sculptures by Alfonso Iannelli, depicting a European settler with a weapon in his hand towering over a Native American. "Some residents decried the piece as racist". As of December 2019 it has not been removed.

=== Mississippi ===
In 2018, the University of Mississippi (Oxford, Mississippi) is considering formally whether to remove the name of donor Ed Meek from the Meek School of Journalism and New Media, after he made Facebook comments found racially offensive. He himself has asked that his name be removed.

=== New Mexico ===
A statue of Diego de Vargas, a symbol of Spanish conquest and rule, is located in a city park in Santa Fe, New Mexico. Elena Ortiz, a tribal member of Ohkay Owingeh Pueblo, called for its removal, saying that "activist groups have been emboldened by the removal of Confederate monuments across the United States."

=== New York ===
- Everything in New York City dedicated to Peter Stuyvesant, including Stuyvesant Square, its statue of Stuyvesant, the neighborhood of Bedford-Stuyvesant, and Stuyvesant High School, because "he was a known anti-Semite."
- Removal of the plaque of French hero and Vichy France leader Philippe Pétain, part of the Canyon of Heroes on Lower Broadway (Manhattan). He was a Nazi collaborator and under him many thousands of French Jews were sent to concentration camps and execution. In January 2018 the Mayoral Advisory Commission on City Art, Monuments, and Markers recommended keeping the plaque, which is part of a set of 206 markers commemorating Broadway parades, but removal of the name "Canyon of Heroes".
- Open Casket, a 2016 painting by the Brooklyn artist Dana Schutz based on photos of the body of Emmett Till, a 14-year-old African-American boy lynched (murdered) by whites in Mississippi in 1955, and whose murderers were found not guilty by an all-white jury. The fact that the painter is white has inspired protests and calls for the painting's destruction by African-American artists, some of whom stood in front of the painting so as to partially obstruct its view, during its 2017 exhibition at the Whitney Museum.
- Statues of Susan B. Anthony and Elizabeth Cady Stanton are to be erected in 2020 in Central Park. Critics say it "manages to recapitulate the marginalization black women experienced during the suffrage movement".
- The statue of President Theodore Roosevelt in front of the American Museum of Natural History, which depicts him on horseback, flanked by a black man and a Native American, was defaced with red paint in 1971 as "a response to the insult Native Americans took from the statue". It was defaced again on October 26, 2017. A few hours later, a group claiming responsibility for the defilement stated that the statue embodied "patriarchy, white supremacy, and settler-colonialism." The Mayoral Advisory Commission on City Art, Monuments, and Markers, led by Tom Finkelpearl, commissioner of the New York City Department of Cultural Affairs, and Darren Walker, president of the Ford Foundation, set up by mayor Bill de Blasio, was unable to make a decision on what to do about the statue, and it therefore remains in place. In July 2019 the Museum inaugurated an exhibit, "Addressing the Statue", about the controversy.

=== North Carolina ===
North Carolina Supreme Court announced on December 24 it will remove a portrait of Thomas Ruffin, a former chief justice who was a slave owner, from one of its walls. Ruffin authored the opinion in North Carolina v. Mann that allowed unrestricted violence of slave owners over their slaves.

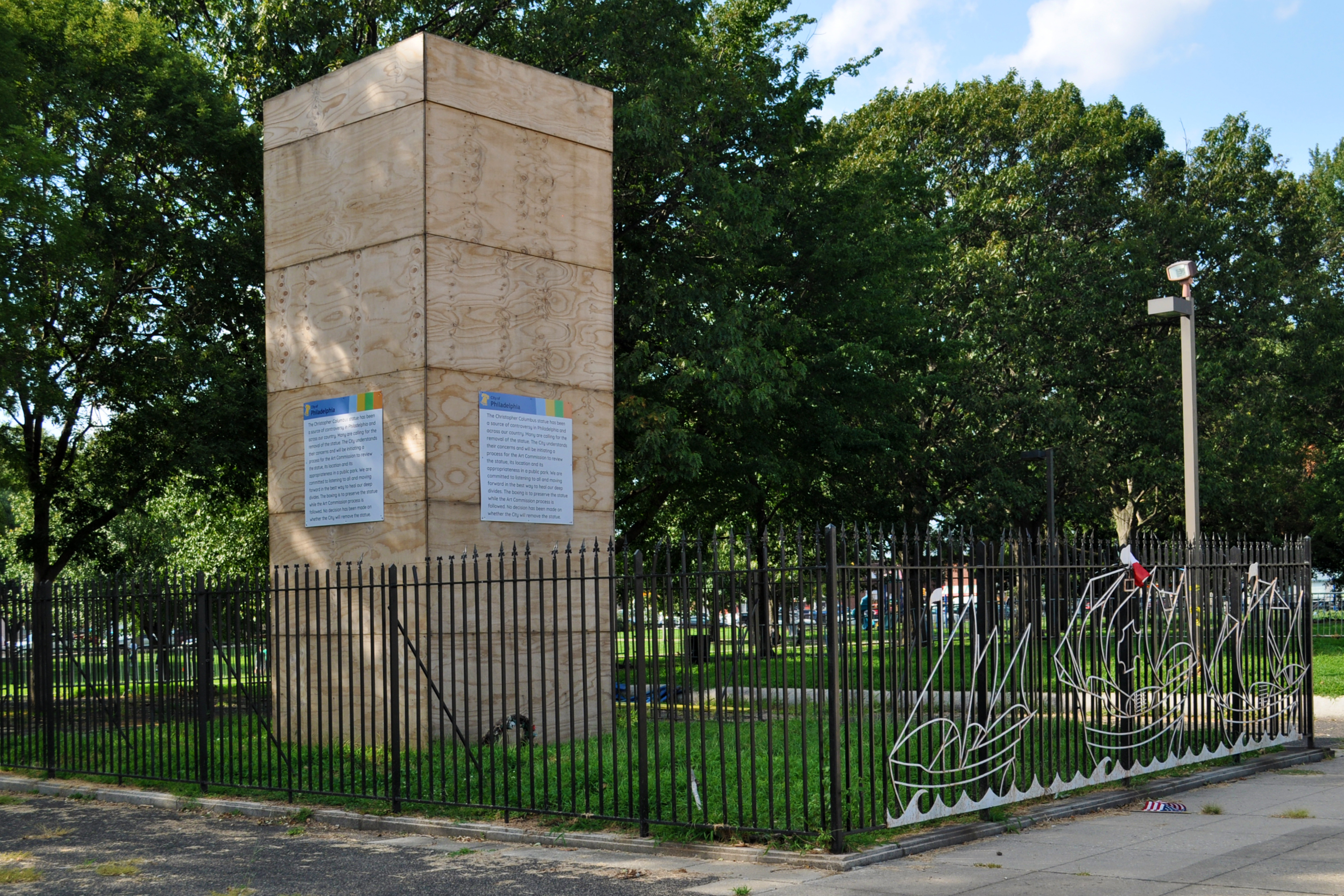
Christopher Columbus Monument boxed in Marconi Plaza Philadelphia PA (June 2020)

=== Pennsylvania ===
On August 12, 2020, the Philadelphia Art Commission issued an order to remove a statue of Christopher Columbus from Marconi Plaza and to place it in temporary storage. This followed an endorsement of a city proposal, two weeks prior, by the Philadelphia Historical Commission, to remove the statue, citing public safety and susceptibility of damage to the statue as a result of the George Floyd protests. Citing preservation of the statue pending a final decision, the City of Philadelphia had it boxed. On August 17, 2021, a judge from Philadelphia Common Pleas Court ruled the decision for removing the statue to be without legal merit.

=== South Carolina ===
A statue of white supremacist Governor and U.S. Senator Benjamin Tillman is on the grounds of the South Carolina State House. In 2017, protestors called for its removal, as well as statues of Confederate officer, white supremacist, and Governor Wade Hampton III, physician J. Marion Sims, who performed experimental surgery on slave women without anesthesia, and a Confederate soldier monument on Gervais Street.

=== Texas ===
Sam Houston Monument in Hermann Park, Houston, Texas. "After we have this one removed, we can then work on getting the 67-foot Sam Houston statue outside of Huntsville turned into parking lot gravel, and the forest renamed."

The city of Austin, Texas "could be headed for a name change because of founder Stephen F. Austin's pro-slavery stance".

A criminal investigation has begun into alleged vandalism of a "Negroes" sign in the Waxahachie County courthouse. Todd Little, the county's top executive, is said to have asked another man to paint over the sign, which was uncovered during renovations and marked with a placard as a reminder of the evil of segregation.

=== Virginia ===
- Charlottesville has Their First View of the Pacific, depicting Meriwether Lewis, William Clark, and Sacagawea, by Charles Keck (1919). Lewis and Clark were born in Virginia. — In November 2019 the Charlottesville City Council voted to remove it. The "council's decision was cheered by the local Native American tribe, the Monacan Indian Nation, and descendants of Sacagawea’s family in Idaho. They say the statue presents a weak and servile image of Sacagawea." Its new home has not been decided, and as of December 1, 2019, it has not been removed.
- Another statue, George Rogers Clark, Conqueror of the Northwest, "is dedicated to William Clark's older brother and stands on the University of Virginia campus. He is astride a horse and towers over three Native American figures, including a cowering woman who holds a baby." "A petition circulating at the university says the statue celebrates war on Native Americans and efforts to eradicate them", and seeks its removal.

=== Washington ===
The Statue of Lenin in Seattle is a 16 ft (5 m) bronze sculpture of Communist revolutionary Vladimir Lenin, by Bulgarian sculptor Emil Venkov. It was completed and put on display in Czechoslovakia in 1988. The statue was taken down following the Velvet Revolution of 1989. It was bought by an American in 1993, who moved it to Washington (state); it is on display in an outdoor retail property in the Fremont neighborhood of Seattle. Since 1995 it has been up for sale. Alt-right media have held up the example of the Fremont Lenin statue to protest the removal of Confederate monuments and memorials in the US. Seattle Mayor Ed Murray called for it to be taken down, saying it represents "historic injustices" and is a symbol of hate, racism, and violence.

Since 2002, Jefferson Davis Park has been operated by the Pacific Northwest chapter of the Sons of Confederate Veterans and commemorating Jefferson Davis, the president of the Confederate States of America. It has been repeatedly vandalized, and its removal or relocation have been proposed.

=== Wyoming ===
Native American leaders have called for the renaming of two geological features in Yellowstone National Park, because they commemorate "individuals [who] have been involved with genocide, where elders and children have been killed": Mount Doane, named for Army officer Gustavus Cheyney Doane, who "led a massacre that killed around 175 Blackfeet people, and he continued to brag about the incident throughout his life". Hayden Valley, named for Ferdinand V. Hayden, a geologist and surveyor. "He also advocated for the extermination of tribal people who refused to comply with federal dictates."

== See also ==
- List of Confederate monuments and memorials
- List of monuments and memorials removed during the George Floyd protests § Christopher Columbus
- List of monuments to African Americans
- Removal of Confederate monuments and memorials
- Rhodes Must Fall
- Native American mascot controversy
