= List of first women lawyers and judges in Washington D.C. =

This is a list of the first women lawyers and judges in Washington, D.C. It includes the year in which the women were admitted to practice law (in parentheses). Also included are women who achieved other distinctions such becoming the first in their state to graduate from law school or become a political figure.

== Firsts in the federal district's history ==
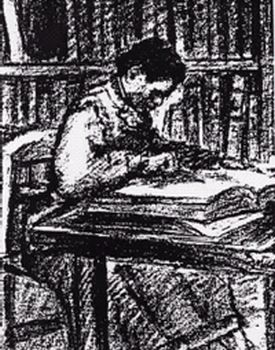
Charlotte E. Ray: First African American female lawyer in the United States and Washington, D.C. (1872)

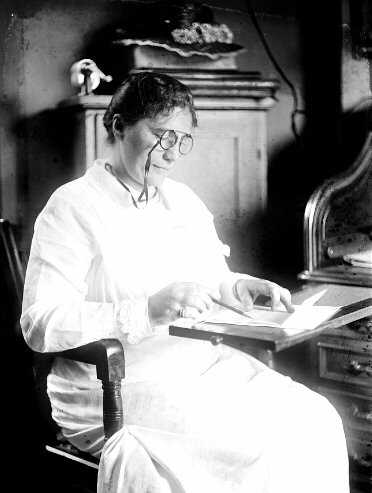
Mary O'Toole: First female municipal court judge in Washington, D.C. (1921)

=== Law school enrollments and degrees ===
- Marie Louise Bottineau Baldwin (1914): First Native American (Ojibwe) female student to graduate from Washington College of Law.
- Renee Grosshandler Baum, Helen Marie Chambers, Patricia Anna Collier, Mary Gertrude Henseler, Katherine Rutherford, Agnes Anne Neill Williams, and Helen Elsie Steinbinder: First female students to enroll at the Georgetown University School of Law (1951). Baum was the first of the original women enrolled to graduate, in 1953.
- Ruth Marshall Paven: First female to graduate with an LLB from the Georgetown University School of Law (1953).
- Hortense E. Spinner and Florinell M. Washington: First African American female students to enroll at the Georgetown University School of Law, though they did not attend (1952).
- Serena E. Davis and Mabel Dole Haden: First African American female graduate students at Georgetown University School of Law (1955).
- Helen E. Steinbinder and Mabel Dole Haden: First females to graduate with a LL.M. degree from the Georgetown University School of Law (1956). Haden was the first African American female to earn the degree.

=== Lawyers ===
- Charlotte E. Ray (1872): First female (and African American) lawyer in Washington, D.C. and to practice before the Supreme Court of the District of Columbia (1872)

=== Law clerk ===
- Cornelia Groefsema Kennedy: First female to serve as a law clerk for the United States Court of Appeals for the District of Columbia Circuit

=== Judges ===
- Marilla Ricker (1882): First female appointed as a United States Commissioner in Washington, D.C. (1891)
- Mary O'Toole (1914): First female judge appointed to the municipal court of Washington, D.C. (1921)
- Burnita Shelton Matthews (1919): First female to serve on the U.S. District Court for the District of Columbia (1949) in Washington, D.C.
- Marjorie Lawson (1950): First African American female judge in Washington, D.C. (1962)
- Julia Cooper Mack (1951): First African American female to serve on the District of Columbia Court of Appeals in Washington, D.C. (1975)
- Patricia Wald (1959): First female to serve on the U.S. Court of Appeals for the District of Columbia Circuit (1979)
- Norma Holloway Johnson (1962): First African American female judge appointed as a U.S. District Court Chief Judge (1997) in Washington, D.C.
- Judith W. Rogers (1968): First African American female to serve on the U.S. Court of Appeals for the District of Columbia Circuit (1994)
- Vanessa Ruiz (1975): First Hispanic female to serve on the District of Columbia Court of Appeals (1994)
- Zinora Mitchell-Rankin (1979): First African American female to serve on the Superior Court of the District of Columbia with a spouse simultaneously serving as a judicial officer (1990)
- Kara Farnandez Stoll (1997): First Latino American female to serve on the U.S. Court of Appeals for the Federal Circuit in Washington, D.C. (2015)
- Neomi Rao: First South Asian American female to serve on the United States Court of Appeals for the District of Columbia Circuit (2019)
- Eleni M. Roumel: First Greek American female to serve on the United States Court of Federal Claims (2020)
- Florence Y. Pan: First Asian American (female) to serve on the U.S. District Court for the District of Columbia (2021)
- Loren AliKhan: First Asian American (female) to serve on the District of Columbia Court of Appeals (2022)
- Rupa Ranga Puttagunta: First South Asian Indian American (female) to serve on the Superior Court of the District of Columbia (2022)
- Ana C. Reyes: First Hispanic American female and openly LGBT person to serve on the United States District Court for the District of Columbia (2023)

=== Attorney general ===
- Judith W. Rogers (1968): First female (and African American) to serve as the D.C. Corporation Counsel (1979) [later renamed Attorney General of the District of Columbia]

=== United States Attorney ===
- Wilma A. Lewis (1981): First female to serve as the United States Attorney for the District of Columbia (1998–2001)
- Jessie K. Liu (1998): First Asian American female to serve as the United States Attorney for the District of Columbia (2017)

=== Assistant United States Attorney ===
- Mazellah (M.) Pearl McCall (1919): First female appointed as the Assistant United States Attorney for the District of Columbia (1921)

=== Bar association ===
- Marna Tucker: First female to serve as the president of the D.C. Bar Association (1984)
- Pauline Schneider: First African American female to serve as president of the D.C. Bar Association
- Brigida Benitez: First Latino American female to serve as the president of the D.C. Bar Association (2014–2015)
- Esther H. Lim: First Korean American female to serve as the president of the D.C. Bar Association (2018)

=== Faculty ===
- Jane Cleo Marshall Lucas (1944): First African American woman to teach full-time at Howard Law School, Washington, D.C.

== See also ==
- List of first women lawyers and judges in the United States
- Timeline of women lawyers in the United States
- Women in law

== Other topics of interest ==
- List of first minority male lawyers and judges in the United States
- List of first minority male lawyers and judges in Washington D.C.
