= Jackson-Reed High School =

Public school in Washington, DC

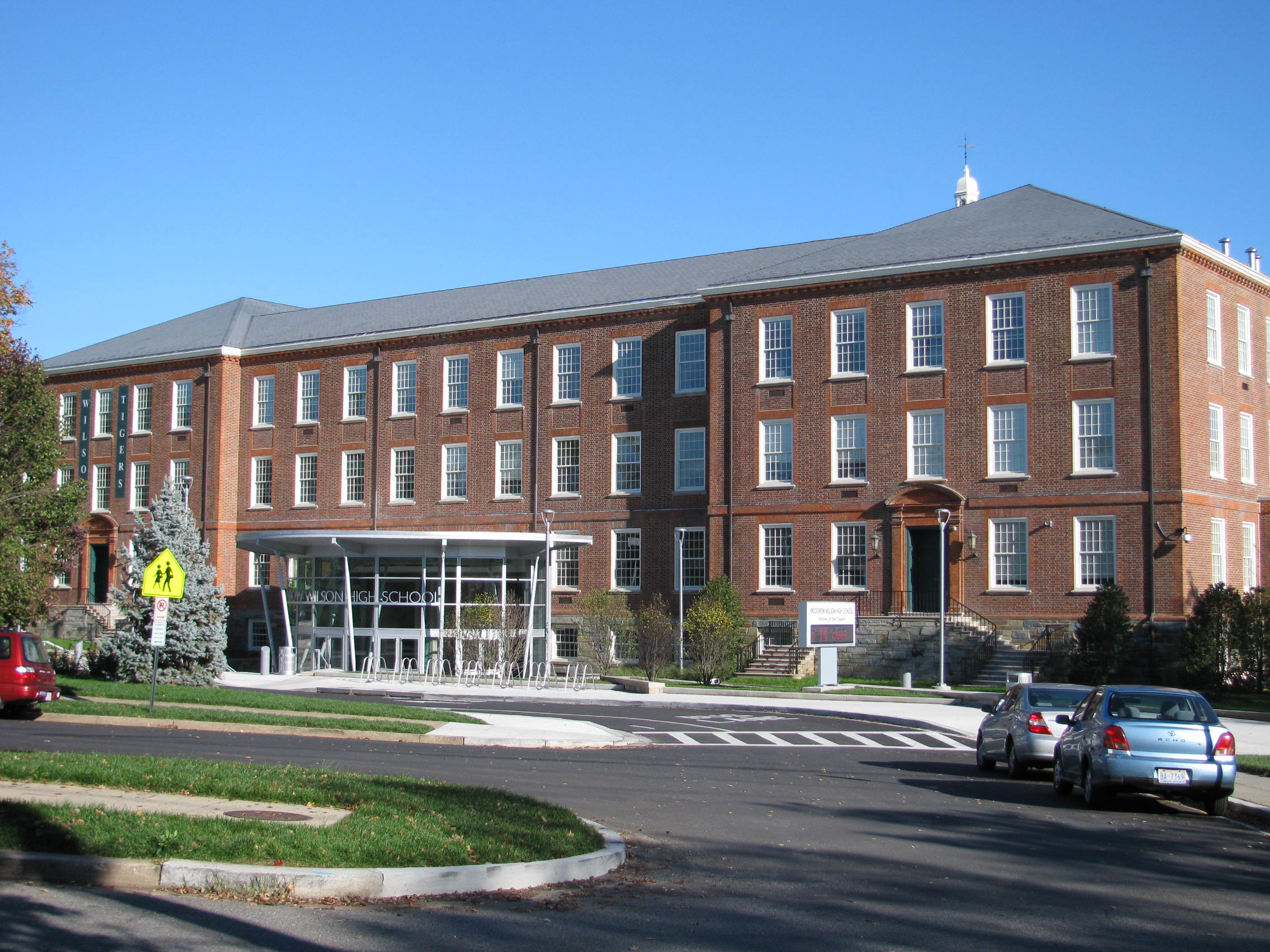

Location
- 3950 Chesapeake St, NW; Washington, D.C. 20016; United States; 38°57′00″N 77°04′40″W

Information
- Former name: Woodrow Wilson High School (1935–2022)
- School type: Public
- Motto: Latin: Haec olim meminisse juvabit (In days to come, it will please us to remember this)
- Established: 1935 (91 years ago)
- School district: District of Columbia Public Schools
- NCES District ID: 1100030
- School number: DC-001-463
- CEEB code: 090230
- NCES School ID: 110003000133
- Principal: Sah Brown
- Faculty: 121.50 (on an FTE basis)
- Grades: 9–12
- Enrollment: 1,994 (2023–24)
- Student to teacher ratio: 16.06
- Campus size: 6 acres (2.4 ha)
- Campus type: Urban
- Colors: Green, white, gray, and black
- Athletics conference: DCIAA, DCSAA
- Mascot: Tigers
- USNWR ranking: 1,553
- Newspaper: The Beacon
- Information: Metro Red Line: Tenleytown-AU
- Website: jacksonreedhs.org
- Jackson-Reed High School
- U.S. National Register of Historic Places
- D.C. Inventory of Historic Sites
- Location within the District of Columbia
- Area: 6 acres (2.4 ha)
- Built: 1935
- Architect: Albert L. Harris, Nathan C. Wyeth
- Architectural style: Late 19th and 20th-century revivals, Colonial Revival
- MPS: Public School Buildings of Washington, DC MPS
- NRHP reference No.: 10000243

Significant dates
- Added to NRHP: May 10, 2010
- Designated DCIHS: February 25, 2010

Jackson-Reed High School (formerly known as Woodrow Wilson High School) is a public high school in Washington, DC. It serves grades 9 through 12 as part of the District of Columbia Public Schools. The school sits in the Tenleytown neighborhood, at the intersection of Chesapeake Street and Nebraska Avenue, NW. Although it primarily serves students in Washington's Ward 3, nearly 30% of the student body lives outside the school's district boundaries.

Opened in 1935, the school was originally named for Woodrow Wilson, the 28th president of the United States. It was renamed in 2022 for Edna Burke Jackson, the school's first African American teacher, and Vincent Reed, its first African American principal. The school building was added to the National Register of Historic Places in 2010 and renovated in 2010–2011.

== History ==
=== Early years ===
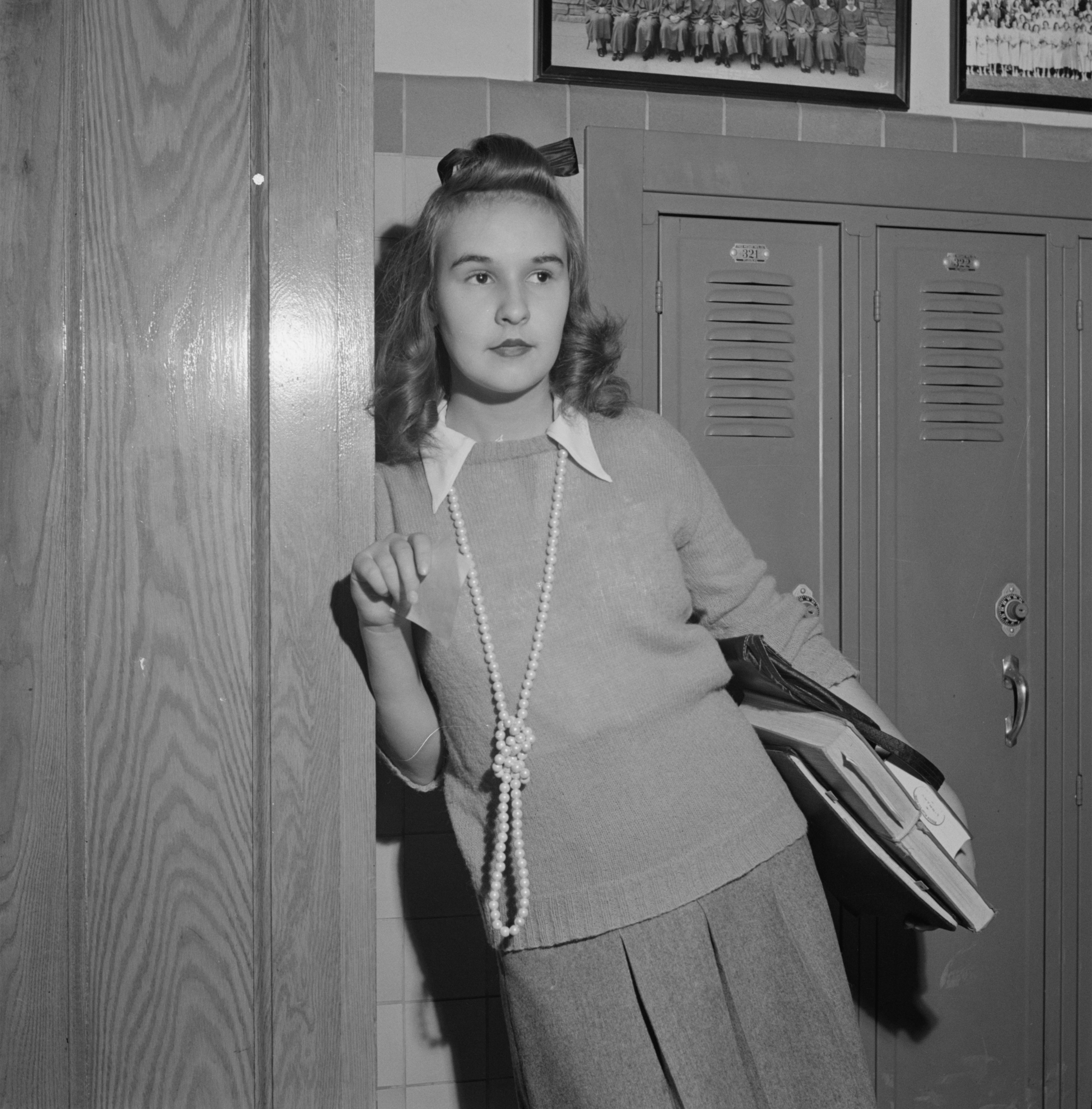
A student in the 1940s with fashion popular at the time

What is now Jackson-Reed High School was built on a patch of land acquired in 1930, known by the neighboring Tenleytowners as "French's Woods." In March 1934, DC commissioners awarded the contract to build the school to the lowest bidder: McCloskey and Co. of Philadelphia. The building was completed for $1.25 million ($22.9 million today).

The school opened its doors to students on 23 September 1935, as an all-white school named for Woodrow Wilson, the 28th president of the United States, the sixth DC Interhigh school. The school started with 640 sophomores and juniors, many of whom had transferred from Central and Western High Schools. Western had been running double shifts (9 a.m. to 5 p.m.) to accommodate students from the Wilson neighborhoods. The first principal was Norman J. Nelson, formerly assistant principal at Western.

Wilson High School graduated its first students in February 1937. Chester Moye was the president of the February graduation class. The school held its first spring commencement exercises for 290 students on 23 June 1937.

=== Subsequent years ===
In September 1955, Wilson was integrated for the first time, enrolling two black students in the 10th grade. The same year, Edna Burke Jackson (for whom the school was later renamed) became one of the school’s first two black teachers.

In the spring of 1970, about 400 students, almost all black, gathered in the school auditorium to protest inequalities in the school. Jay Childers, author of The Evolving Citizen: American Youth and the Changing Norms of Democratic Engagement (2012), wrote that this indicated racial tension in the school.

Stephen P. Tarason succeeded Wilma Bonner as the school's 11th principal in January 1999. Bonner worked briefly at the main DCPS office before accepting a job at Howard University School of Education.

In mid-2006, Woodrow Wilson High School was proposed as a charter school. However, the superintendent asked the school to hold off in exchange for being granted control over certain areas of autonomy, especially facilities.

Jacqueline Williams became interim principal in 2007 after Tarason left to become a middle school principal in Hagerstown, Maryland. The following year, DCPS chancellor Michelle Rhee appointed as principal Peter Cahall, a former teacher and administrator with the Montgomery County Public Schools.

The school building was added to the National Register of Historic Places in 2010.

For the 2006–07 school year, Woodrow Wilson was one of 11 US schools selected by the College Board for the EXCELerator School Improvement Model program, which was funded by the Bill & Melinda Gates Foundation.

=== 2010s ===
Along with several other DC public schools, the campus was renovated in 2011, bringing it to the LEED Gold standard. For the 2010–11 school year, Wilson held classes in a temporary space at the University of the District of Columbia. The renovated school reopened in October, and festivities included a 75th-anniversary celebration.

Childers wrote that the school had been "increasingly troubled" before 2012.

In June 2014, Cahall came out as gay to his students during the school's gay pride day. He said that his students inspired him to come out. The Westboro Baptist Church had stated that it was going to protest against Pride Day.

Cahall left his post in December 2014, in the middle of the school year, after DCPS announced that his contract would not be renewed. Cahall said his contract was not renewed due to low test scores. In 2015, Cahall became the principal of Thomas Edison High School of Technology.

In the spring of that year, a panel headed by teachers and other employees, parents, and members of the surrounding community examined candidates for the principal position. DCPS ultimately hired Kimberly Martin, who had served as the principal of Lorain Admiral King High School in Lorain, Ohio, from 2003 to 2005, after teaching there for five years; as principal of Thomas W. Harvey High School in Painesville, Ohio, from 2005 to 2012; and as principal of Aspen High School in Aspen, Colorado, from 2012 to 2015. She began her term as principal of Wilson on 29 June 2015.

In 2015, DCPS proposed a $15.6 million budget for Wilson, down $300,000 from the previous year, despite a projected increase in enrollment.

=== 2020s: new name ===
The 21st century saw sporadic discussions about whether Woodrow Wilson was an appropriate namesake for a high school. Wilson supported segregation, and his works as a historian are pillars of the Dunning School approach to the American Civil War and Reconstruction era. His presidency was part of what is known as the nadir of American race relations. As US president, he began or allowed segregation and purges among federal workers, including in the US armed forces.

Such discussions gained traction in 2015 when Princeton University students argued for the removal of Wilson's name from campus buildings. Some suggested that the high school be renamed to honor Reno, a black community demolished in the 1930s to create Fort Reno Park, because Wilson's policies, particularly his segregation of the federal workforce, laid the groundwork for dismantling it. Proponents of changing the name argued, as the Washington Post put it in 2019, that "the community in Northwest Washington has to acknowledge that the federal government—after Wilson left office—uprooted established black communities to create the upper-income, largely white enclave it is today."

On 15 September 2020, DC Public Schools officials announced the school would change its name by the end of 2020, at an estimated cost of $1.2 million. After a citywide call for nominations drew more than 2,000 submissions, the mayor settled on nine finalists and put the list to a community vote. By far, more than 30 percent of the vote went to August Wilson, the African American playwright. The DCPS leaders and the mayor's office expressed support, so the school planned to rename itself August Wilson High School in the fall of 2021. However, the Mayor and the DC Council failed to act on the name change formally. The class of 2022 graduated with the simplified name "Wilson High School" on their diplomas.

On 20 December 2021, the DC Council voiced opposition to the proposed new name and voted instead to name the school Jackson-Reed High School, after Edna Burke Jackson, the first African American teacher at Wilson High School, and Vincent Reed, an African American principal who became DC Public Schools superintendent. Bowser did not formally respond to the DC Council's actions, which passed with a veto-proof majority. The bill was transmitted for Congressional review under the Home Rule Charter without incident and became law on March 15, 2022.

== Admissions ==
=== Demographics ===
As of the 2022-23 school year, Jackson-Reed serves 2,153 students. Jackson-Reed is the largest comprehensive public high school in the District.

The Beacon, the school newspaper, described the school as "an integrated school, an unusual, precious, fragile organism, attacked from many sides" in December 1970.

In 1955, 99% of Jackson-Reed students were white, and by the late 1960s, the school was still predominantly white. A campaign for racial integration occurred in the late 1960s and early 1970s. The school was 17% white by 1980. By 2012, there had been a decline in students from wealthier families; by then, many alternative options for schooling had appeared in the DCPS system.

=== Attendance boundaries ===
Jackson-Reed primarily serves students in Ward 3. School boundaries encompass everything west of 16th Street, NW.

Neighborhoods include Adams Morgan, Georgetown, Glover Park, Chevy Chase, Friendship Heights and Tenleytown.

The following elementary schools feed into Jackson-Reed:

- Bancroft Elementary School
- Hearst Elementary School
- Janney Elementary School
- Lafayette Elementary School
- Murch Elementary School
- Oyster-Adams Bilingual School
- Shepherd Elementary School

The following middle schools feed into Jackson-Reed:

- Deal Middle School
- Oyster-Adams Bilingual School

However, nearly 30% of the student body lives outside the school's boundaries. Those students come from all parts of the District, and students come to Jackson-Reed from 40 different schools in the city.

Many students live in poor neighborhoods near the school, and 12% receive free and reduced-price lunch benefits.

Tenleytown, the neighborhood surrounding Jackson-Reed, has a median family income of over $80,000 as of 2012.

The school's student body is ethnically mixed: 29% African American, 38% Caucasian, 24% Latin American, and 4% Asian American.

== Curriculum ==
Students are required to complete 24 credits for graduation, including courses in Art, English, Health and Physical Education, Mathematics, Music, Science, Social Studies, and World Languages.

Many Jackson-Reed students enroll in advanced courses; As of 2024, Jackson-Reed offers 30 Advanced Placement courses and electives, which is the most in DCPS. In the 2022–2023 school year, Jackson-Reed had a 55% rate of scoring 3–5 in Advanced Placement courses

Many Jackson-Reed students are members of NAF/PLTW/CTE academies that seek to tailor students' curricula to their academic or professional interests. These include IT Academy, Engineering Academy, Biomedical Academy, Academy of Finance, AV Production Academy, Academy of Graphic Design, Academy of Global Studies, Leadership Academy: JROTC & Cybersecurity, Academy of Hospitality and Tourism, and Triple A (Athletic Achievement Academy).

== Extracurricular activities ==
=== Athletics ===
During its first school year in 1935–36, Jackson-Reed (then-Wilson High School) was not eligible to play in the Inter-High School Athletic Association. The newly formed basketball and baseball teams played an exhibition-only schedule the first year, and there was no football team. The basketball and baseball teams began their official Inter-High Series competition in the 1936–'37 school year. The football team played an exhibition season in 1936–37 and officially joined the Inter-High Series a year later, in the fall of 1937. School teams were frequently nicknamed "the Presidents" by newspaper sportswriters in the early years. Going into the 2024-25 school year, there will be 35 Varsity, JV, and First-year teams for boys and girls.

==== Baseball ====
By 2008, the Tigers had won 16 consecutive DCIAA baseball championships. Through their 2011 season, the baseball program won 19 consecutive DCIAA championships.

==== Basketball ====
In the 2023-24 season, the boys' varsity team was ranked #39 nationally, according to MaxPreps. They went 33-3 and won the DCIAA championship game against Cardozo High School. In the DCSAA Class 2A state playoffs, they lost in the semifinal game against St. John's College High School by a score of 55-52.

==== Other sports ====
The boys' ultimate frisbee team is currently ranked eighth in the country, and the girls' team is 17th, according to Ultiworld magazine as of April 5, 2019. The Tigers athletic program maintains the only crew team among DC public high schools. Varsity softball won the DCIAA championship for three consecutive years in 2007, 2008, and 2009. In 2009, the team, led by seniors Kathleen McLain and Rachel Bitting, played Georgetown Visitation in the Congressional Bank Softball Classic, in which the softball champion of the DC public schools played the champion of the DC private schools. Wilson won the game, 3–2.

=== Publications ===
Jackson-Reed's school newspaper is called The Beacon. It began publication in 1935. In 2012, Jay Childers wrote that the quality of the publication and the publishing frequency of the Beacon declined as the school had increased difficulties. Historically, the school administration did not, and still does not, review Beacon articles before publication, even though the US Supreme Court in Hazelwood v. Kuhlmeier stated that principals have the right to have control over newspaper content. In August 2015, Principal Kimberly Martin—who had canceled the publication of a newspaper article at her previous school in Colorado—announced that the school would require the newspaper to allow her and her staff to review all articles before publication. This led to student protests, including a Change.org petition. The newspaper staff criticized and opposed the proposal. By September, Martin and the co-editors agreed to end the prior review plan.

== Campus ==
The campus includes an Olympic-sized swimming pool, theater space, and a large atrium. Behind the school, there is a turf football field surrounded by a 400-yard running track—closer to 350 meters than the standard 400.

=== Athletic facilities ===
Jackson-Reed Stadium opened for duty in 1939. An artificial turf field was installed over the summer of 2007. A sound system, press box, and lights were also added to the stadium. The stadium is now used for several sports, including soccer, football, and lacrosse.

The high school's campus has also had an aquatic facility since the late 1970s. It first opened in 1978 but was condemned and demolished in 2007. A new Aquatic Center for Ward 3 was completed in 2009, with an indoor 50-meter swimming pool, a children's pool, and other facilities.

== Lawsuit ==
In December 2023, after the 2023 Hamas-led attack on Israel, school officials denied a request by the school's Arab Student Union to show The Occupation of the American Mind, a controversial film that accuses Israel of disproportionately influencing American media and public perception of the Israel-Palestinian conflict, because officials said the club had failed to follow the process for getting the event approved. In April 2024, the Arab Student Union, represented by the DC branch of the American Civil Liberties Union, sued the school, alleging that it violated members First Amendment rights. The case is ongoing. In an interim agreement with DC Public Schools, the students dropped their demand to show the film in exchange for an agreement to show an alternate film that the school had previously rejected.

== Awards and recognition ==
In April 2013, Jackson-Reed was named a Green Ribbon School by the US Department of Education in recognition of "being good stewards of the environment."

== Notable alumni ==
Notable alumni of Jackson-Reed High School include:

- Aquil Abdullah (1991), Olympic rower
- Yvette Alexander (1979), former Washington, DC councilmember
- Robert Altman (1964), attorney and ZeniMax Media co-founder
- John Astin (1948), actor
- Ann Beattie (1965), short story writer and novelist
- Philip Benedict (1966), professor of European History
- Sekou Biddle (1989), former Washington, DC councilmember
- David Boggs (1968), engineer and co-inventor of Ethernet
- Kwame R. Brown (1989), former Washington, DC councilmember
- Doris Buffett (1945), philanthropist and sister of investor Warren Buffett
- Warren Buffett (1947), businessman and investor
- Emmanuel Burriss (2003), professional baseball player
- Ruth Burtnick Glick (1960), author under name Rebecca York
- Duane Carrell (1968), NFL athlete
- Jack Casady (1962), rock musician most known for Jefferson Airplane
- Ramsey Clark (1946), former US Attorney General for President Lyndon Johnson and liberal activist
- John R. D. Cleland (1943), US Army major general
- Jean Craighead George (1937), author
- Howard Dawson (1940), US Tax Court judge
- Erik Todd Dellums (1982), television and film actor
- Zelda Diamond Fichandler (1941), theatrical director-producer
- Kenneth Feld (1966), businessman
- Adrian Fenty (attended, did not graduate), former mayor of Washington, DC
- Angelo Fields (1976), athlete
- Charles Fleischer (1968), actor and voice talent
- Clarence Greenwood (1986), musician under the name Citizen Cope
- George Grizzard (1945), actor
- Gilbert Gude (1941), Congressman and author
- Stanley S. Harris (1945), US District Court Judge in Washington, DC
- Hugh Newell Jacobsen (1947), architect
- Jorma Kaukonen (1959), guitarist
- Larry Kramer (1953), playwright, novelist, and gay rights activist
- Ricky Lindo (born 2000), American-Panamanian basketball player in the Israeli Basketball Premier League
- Romulus Z. Linney (1949), playwright and novelist
- Mark MacDonald, politician
- Ian MacKaye (1980), musician
- David Mays (1986), publisher of The Source magazine
- Kenyan McDuffie (1992), Washington, DC councilmember
- Robert "Bud" McFarlane (1955), National Security Advisor to President Ronald Reagan
- Derek McGinty (1977), television journalist
- Donald McKinnon (1956), politician
- Zinora Mitchell-Rankin (1973), DC Superior Court Judge
- Paul Miller (1988), hip-hop musician under the name DJ Spooky
- Roger Mudd (1945), broadcast journalist and author
- Jeff Nelson (1980), musician
- Judith Perlman Martin (1955), syndicated columnist "Miss Manners"
- Adam Rapoport (1987), American magazine editor
- Frank Rich (1967), essayist, op-ed columnist, and writer
- Malaya Rivera Drew (1995), television actress
- Richard Saslaw (1958), politician
- Clifford Stearns (1959), Congressman
- Bert Sugar (1953), sports writer and boxing expert
- Harry Thomas Jr. (1978), former Washington, DC councilmember
- Conrad Tillard, politician, Baptist minister, radio host, author, and activist
- Melvin Tuten (1991), NFL offensive lineman
- Alex Wagner (1995), political journalist and television personality
- John Warner (1945), politician and former US Senator from Virginia
- Jimmy Williams (1978), former NFL linebacker, football coach
- Toby Williams (1978), former NFL defensive tackle
