= Michael Rankin =

American judge (born 1946)

Senior Judge of the Superior Court of the District of Columbia
- Incumbent
- Assumed office August 31, 2019

Associate Judge of the Superior Court of the District of Columbia
- In office 1986 – August 31, 2019
- President: Ronald Reagan
- Preceded by: Nicholas S. Nunzio
- Succeeded by: Judith E. Pipe

Personal details
- Born: August 7, 1946 (age 78); Memphis, Tennessee, U.S.
- Spouse: Zinora Mitchell-Rankin
- Education: Lincoln University (BA); Howard University (JD)

Michael L. Rankin (born August 7, 1946) is a senior judge of the Superior Court of the District of Columbia.

== Education and career ==
Rankin earned his Bachelor of Arts from Lincoln University in 1967 and his Juris Doctor from Howard University School of Law in 1970.

=== D.C. Superior Court ===
President Ronald Reagan nominated Rankin on November 13, 1985, to a 15-year term as an associate judge on the Superior Court of the District of Columbia to the seat vacated by Nicholas S. Nunzio. On December 9, 1985, the Senate Committee on Homeland Security and Governmental Affairs held a hearing on his nomination. On December 12, 1985, the Committee reported his nomination favorably to the senate floor. On December 16, 1985, the full Senate confirmed his nomination by voice vote.

In 2000, and again in 2015, the Commission on Judicial Disabilities and Tenure recommended that he be reinstated for another fifteen year term as judge. He took senior status on August 31, 2019.

== Personal life ==
Rankin is married to fellow D.C. Superior Court judge Zinora Mitchell-Rankin and they have four children.

Legal offices
Preceded by Nicholas S. Nunzio	Associate Judge of the Superior Court of the District of Columbia; 1986–2019	Succeeded by Judith E. Pipe
