= Helen Steinbinder =

American law professor

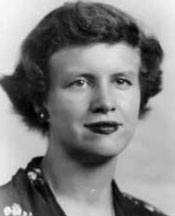
- Born: Helen Elsie Steinbinder; 1923 (age 101–102); New York City, New York, United States
- Died: July 2, 2015 (aged 91–92); Butler, New Jersey, United States
- Occupation: Professor of Law
- Years active: 1957-1988
- Known for: First female professor at Georgetown Law School

Helen Elsie Steinbinder (1923 – 2 July 2015) was an American law professor and the first female professor of law at the Georgetown University.

== Life ==
She was born as Helen Elsie Steinbinder in New York City, New York, to a middle-class family. Her parents were Charles Steinbinder, an upholsterer and Mary Benis. They came from Hungary to the United States.

She graduated in Manhattanville College. After that she continued her education at the Columbia University where she achieved a Masters of Library Science degree. Then she graduated with a Doctorate of Law from Georgetown University Law School in 1954. She was part of the first female class where she and Katherine Rutherford Keener were the first women in the so-called "afternoon class" 1952–1953 to receive a Juris Doctor degree. Helen Steinbinder and Mabel Dole Haden were the first women to receive a Master of Law (LL.M.) degree in 1956.

She then went on to be the first female Law Professor at Georgetown Law School teaching her first course in 1957. She taught classes in real estate and property and worked also as a faculty adviser for Res Ipsa Loquitur (since 1994 as Georgetown Law Journal) - a student newspaper and alumni magazine of Georgetown University. She retired in 1988 and died on 2 July 2015.

== Personal life ==
She lived most of her life in Butler, New Jersey, where she was a supporter of St. Anthony Church School.

== Sources ==
- U.C. Davis law review (2002), Volume 36, Edition 1-3 - University of California
- Alumni Notes (1947), Volumes 8-9 - University of Michigan. Dept. of Library Science
