= List of first minority male lawyers and judges in Washington D.C. =

This is a list of the first minority male lawyers and judges in Washington, D.C. It includes the year in which the men were admitted to practice law (in parentheses). Also included are men who achieved other distinctions such becoming the first in their state to graduate from law school or become a political figure.

== Firsts in the federal district's history ==
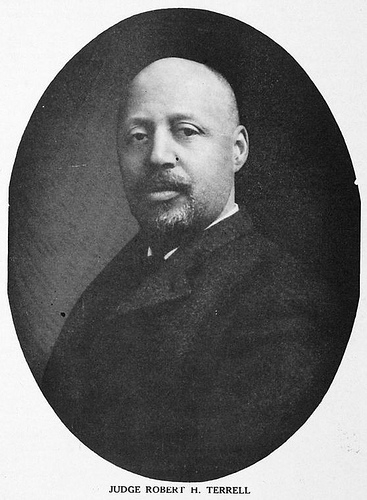
Robert Heberton Terrell: First African American male judge in Washington, D.C.

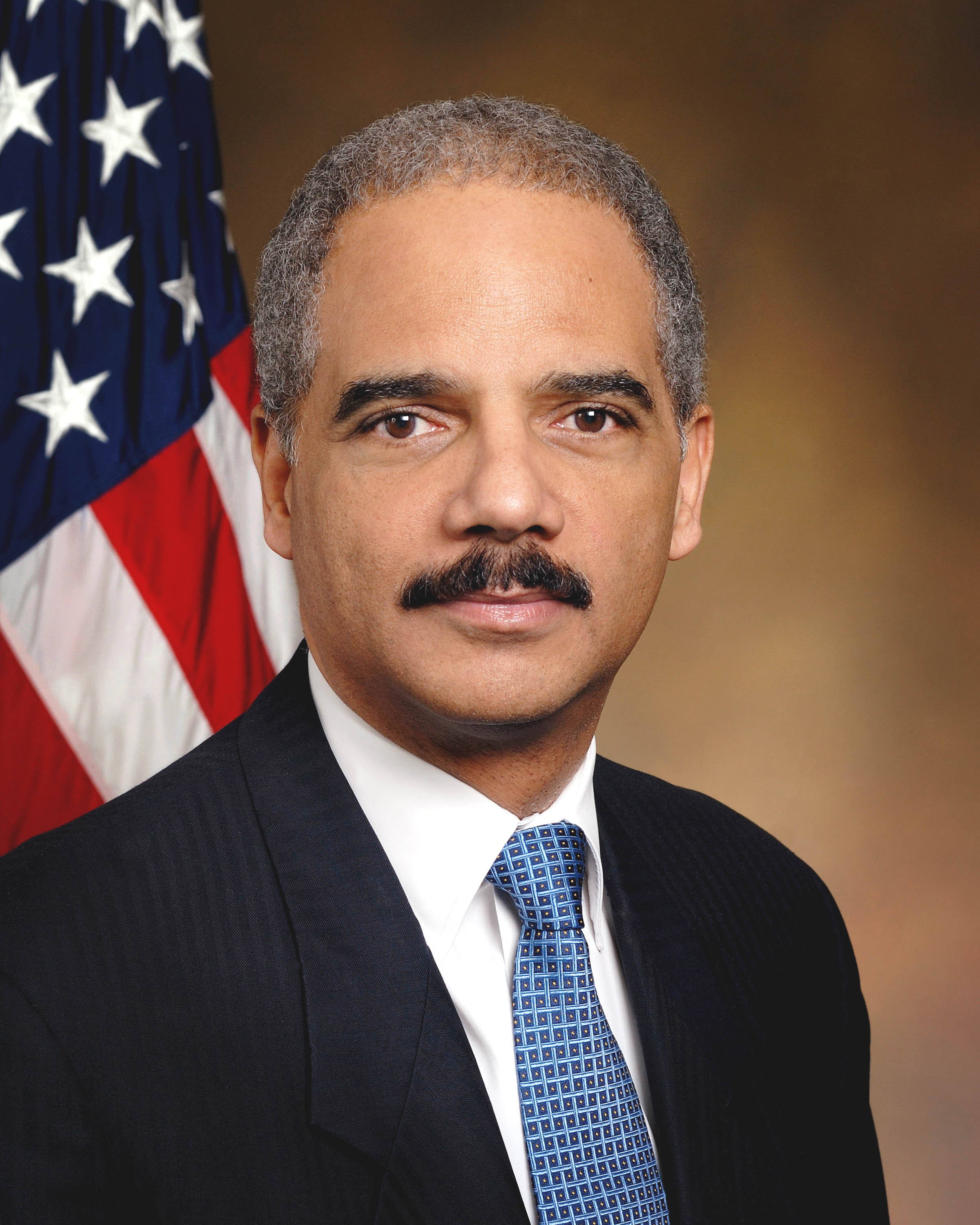
Eric Holder: First African American male to serve as the U.S. Attorney for the District of Columbia (1993)

=== Law School ===
- Yasimori Asada: First Japanese male student to enroll at the Georgetown University School of Law (1877) [Washington, D.C.]
- Winston A. Douglas, Elmer W. Henderson, William D. Martin and Lutrelle F. Parke: First African American male students to enroll at the Georgetown University School of Law (1948) [Washington, D.C.]
- Albert T. Gonzales (1935): First blind male to graduate from Georgetown University School of Law [Washington, D.C.]

=== Lawyers ===
- George Boyer Vashon (1869): First African American male lawyer in Washington, D.C.
- Fountain Peyton: First African American male lawyer to argue a case in the Court of Appeals of the District of Columbia
- Thomas H. Jones: First African American male lawyer to serve as an assistant to the United States Attorney for the District of Columbia (c. 1920s)

=== Judicial Officers ===
==== Justice of the Peace ====
- John A. Moss: First African American male Justice of the Peace in Washington, D.C. (1873)

==== Judges ====
- Robert Heberton Terrell (1893): First African American male judge in Washington, D.C.
- Spottswood William Robinson III (1939): First African American male serve on the U.S. Court of Appeals for the District of Columbia Circuit (1966) and the chief justice of the District of Columbia Circuit (1981)
- Austin L. Fickling: First African American to serve on the District of Columbia Court of Appeals (1968)
- William B. Bryant (1939): First African American male appointed as the chief judge of the U.S. District Court for the District of Columbia (1977)
- David S. Tatel (1966): First blind male to serve on the U.S. Court of Appeals for the District of Columbia Circuit (1994)
- Theodore Roosevelt Newman Jr. (1958): First African American male appointed as the chief judge of the Washington Court of Appeals (1976)
- Ricardo M. Urbina (1970): First Latino American male judge in Washington, D.C. (1981). He would later become a district court judge.
- Maurice B. Foley: First African American male to serve as a Judge of the United States Tax Court (1995)
- Amit P. Mehta (1997): First Asian Pacific American male serve on the U.S. District Court for the District of Columbia (2013)
- Sri Srinivasan (1995): First South Asian American male serve on the U.S. Court of Appeals for the District of Columbia Circuit (2013) and serve as its chief judge (2020)
- Brad Garcia: First Latino American male to serve as a Judge of the United States Court of Appeals for the District of Columbia Circuit (2023)
- Amir Ali: First Arab American male to serve as a Judge of the United States District Court for the District of Columbia (2024)

=== Attorney General ===
- Karl Racine: First Haitian-born American male elected as the Attorney General of the District of Columbia (2010)

=== United States Attorney ===
- Eric Holder (1976): First African American male to serve as the United States Attorney for the District of Columbia (1993-1997)

=== Assistant United States Attorney ===
- William B. Bryant (1939): First African American male as the Assistant United States Attorney for the District of Columbia (1951-1954)
- Tejpal Singh: First Sikh male appointed by the DOJ as the Assistant United States Attorney for the District of Columbia (2003)

=== Bar Association ===
- Charles Duncan: First African American male to serve as the president of the D.C. Bar Association
- Darrell G. Mottley: First Hispanic American male to serve as the president of the D.C. Bar Association (2011)

=== Faculty ===
- Viet D. Dinh: First Vietnamese American law professor tenured at Georgetown University

== See also ==
- List of first minority male lawyers and judges in the United States

== Other topics of interest ==
- List of first women lawyers and judges in the United States
- List of first women lawyers and judges in Washington D.C.
