= Kimberley S. Knowles =

American judge (born 1970)

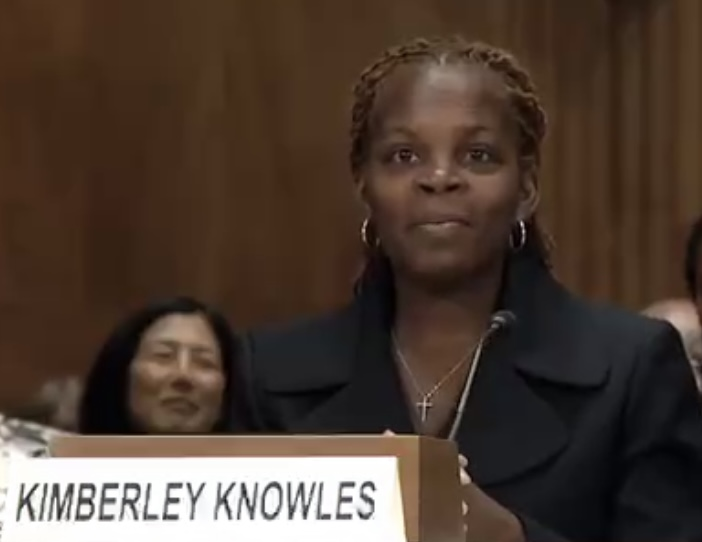

Senior Judge of the Superior Court of the District of Columbia
- Incumbent
- Assumed office 2026

Associate Judge of the Superior Court of the District of Columbia
- In office November 9, 2012 – January 24, 2026
- President: Barack Obama
- Preceded by: Zinora Mitchell-Rankin
- Succeeded by: Craig Leen

Magistrate Judge of the Superior Court of the District of Columbia
- In office May 10, 2010 – November 9, 2012

Personal details
- Born: Kimberley Sherri Knowles; October 7, 1970 (age 55) Bronx, New York, U.S.
- Education: Cornell University (BA); Howard University (JD)

Kimberley Sherri Knowles (born October 7, 1970) is a senior judge of the Superior Court of the District of Columbia. She served as a magistrate judge of the same court from 2010 to 2012.

== Education and career ==
Knowles earned her Bachelor of Arts from Cornell University in 1992, and her J.D. from Howard University School of Law in 1996. She is an alumna of Prep for Prep.

After law school, Knowles clerked for then Judge Eric T. Washington of the D.C. Superior Court. She then went on to work in the U.S. Attorney's Office in the District of Columbia. In 2004, she became the deputy chief of the office's Sex Offense/Domestic Violence Section.

=== D.C. superior court ===
On May 10, 2010, Chief Judge Lee F. Satterfield appointed Knowles as a magistrate judge of the Superior Court of the District of Columbia.

President Barack Obama nominated Knowles on June 11, 2012, to a 15-year term as an associate judge of the Superior Court of the District of Columbia to the seat vacated by Zinora M. Mitchell. On July 20, 2012, the Senate Committee on Homeland Security and Governmental Affairs held a hearing on her nomination. On August 2, 2012, the Committee reported her nomination favorably to the senate floor and later that day, the full Senate confirmed her nomination by voice vote. She was sworn in on November 9, 2012. Knowles retired as an associate judge on January 24, 2026 and took senior status.

== Personal life ==
Knowles was born and raised in Bronx, New York with 2 older brothers. She moved to Washington D.C. to attend law school and has remained there since. She is the adoptive parent of one child.
