= Duane Carrell =

American football player (born 1949)

No. 10, 17, 3, 12
- Position: Punter

Personal information
- Born: October 3, 1949 (age 77); Washington, D.C., U.S.
- Listed height: 5 ft 10 in (1.78 m)
- Listed weight: 185 lb (84 kg)

Career information
- High school: Wilson (Washington, D.C.)
- College: Florida State
- NFL draft: 1972: undrafted

Career history
- Washington Redskins (1972)*; St. Louis Cardinals (1973)*; Jacksonville Sharks (1974); Dallas Cowboys (1974); Los Angeles Rams (1975); New York Jets (1976–1977); St. Louis Cardinals (1977); Dallas Cowboys (1979)*
- * Offseason or practice squad member only

Career NFL statistics
- Punts: 257
- Punt yards: 9,997
- Longest punt: 72
- Stats at Pro Football Reference

Duane Blore Carrell (born October 3, 1949) is an American former professional football player who was a punter in the National Football League (NFL) for the Dallas Cowboys, Los Angeles Rams, New York Jets, and St. Louis Cardinals. He played college football for the Florida State Seminoles.

== Early life ==
Carrell attended Woodrow Wilson High School. He accepted a football scholarship from Florida State University, where he was a punter and placekicker.

As a sophomore, he became a starter at punter, registering 32 punts for 1,169 yards (36.5 yard average) and a long of 50 yards. As a junior, he was ranked 17th in the country with a punting average of 40.6 yards, while making 63 punts for 2,556 yards with a long of 68 yards.

As a senior, he posted 53 punts for 1,921 yards (36.2-yard average) and a long of 54 yards.

== Professional career ==
=== Washington Redskins ===
On June 8, 1972, was signed as an undrafted free agent by the Washington Redskins after an open tryout. He was waived before the start of the season in July. After his release, he played semi-professional football with the Hagerstown Bears of the Seaboard Football League.

=== St. Louis Cardinals (first stint) ===
On May 2, 1973, he was claimed off waivers by the St. Louis Cardinals. He was released on August 9. After his release, he returned to play semi-professional football with the Hagerstown Bears of the Seaboard Football League.

=== Jacksonville Sharks ===
In April 1974, he signed with the Jacksonville Sharks of the World Football League, where he played until the team folded operations. He averaged 41.4 yards on 93 punts in 14 games.

=== Dallas Cowboys (first stint) ===
On October 30, 1974, he was signed as a free agent by the Dallas Cowboys, to replace punter Marv Bateman. On September 14, 1975, he was released after averaging 39.8 yards per punt during the preseason and being passed on the depth chart by rookie Mitch Hoopes.

=== Los Angeles Rams ===
On September 16, 1975, he was signed by the Los Angeles Rams as a free agent, to replace punter Jim McCann. He was cut on August 5, 1976.

=== New York Jets ===
On September 3, 1976, he was signed by the New York Jets. He was tied for ninth punter in the league with a 39.7 yards average and had a punt of 72 yards (third longest in franchise history) against the San Francisco 49ers. He was released on September 28, 1977.

=== St. Louis Cardinals (second stint) ===
On October 13, 1977, he was signed as a free agent by the St. Louis Cardinals, to replace punter Terry Joyce. He announced his retirement on July 23, 1978.

=== Dallas Cowboys (second stint) ===
On August 9, 1979, he was signed by the Dallas Cowboys to punt in place of an injured Danny White. He was released on August 21.

== Personal life ==
Carrell earned a bachelor's degree while at Florida State University and also helped to found a chapter of the Beta Theta Pi fraternity while he was a student athlete.
