= Judith E. Pipe =

Washington D.C. judge (born 1980)

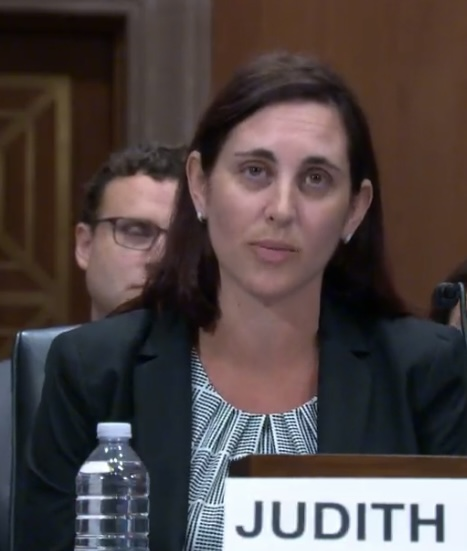

Associate Judge of the Superior Court of the District of Columbia
- Incumbent
- Assumed office June 21, 2024
- Appointed by: Joe Biden
- Preceded by: Michael Rankin

Magistrate Judge of the Superior Court of the District of Columbia
- In office January 2020 – June 21, 2024
- Appointed by: Robert E. Morin

Personal details
- Born: October 27, 1980 (age 45) Falls Church, Virginia, U.S.
- Education: American University (BA); Catholic University of America (JD)

Judith Emily Pipe (born October 27, 1980) is an American lawyer who has served as an associate judge of the Superior Court of the District of Columbia. She previously served as a magistrate judge of the same court from 2020 to 2024.

== Education ==
Pipe received a Bachelor of Arts from American University, cum laude, in 2003 and a Juris Doctor from the Catholic University's Columbus School of Law, magna cum laude, in 2007.

== Career ==
From 2007 to 2019, Pipe served as a staff attorney and a supervising attorney with the Public Defender Service for the District of Columbia. Since 2020 she has served as a magistrate judge of the Superior Court of the District of Columbia, after being appointed by Robert E. Morin. She has served in the domestic violence division and criminal division, presiding over criminal and civil matters. From October 2011 to March 2013, she served on the Drug Court committee for Superior Court, which she overhauled and gained national recognition.

=== D.C. superior court service ===
In March 2023, Pipe was one of three people recommended by the District of Columbia Judicial Nomination Commission to fill the vacancy left by the retirement of Judge John M. Campbell. On June 28, 2023, President Joe Biden announced his intent to nominate Pipe to serve as an associate judge of the Superior Court of the District of Columbia. On July 11, 2023, her nomination was sent to the Senate. President Biden nominated Pipe to the seat vacated by Judge Michael Rankin, who retired on August 31, 2019. On September 21, 2023, a hearing on her nomination was held before the Senate Homeland Security and Governmental Affairs Committee. On September 27, 2023, her nomination was reported out of the committee by a 7–2 vote. On January 3, 2024, her nomination was returned to the president under Rule XXXI, Paragraph 6 of the United States Senate. She was renominated on January 11, 2024. On January 31, 2024, her nomination was reported out of committee by a 10–3 vote. On June 4, 2024, the Senate invoked cloture on her nomination by a 56–42 vote. On June 5, 2024, her nomination was confirmed by a 55–38 vote. She was sworn in on June 21, 2024.

Legal offices
Preceded by Michael Rankin	Associate Judge of the Superior Court of the District of Columbia; 2024–present	Incumbent
