= Mabel Dole Haden =

American lawyer

- Born: Mabel Rebecca Dole Haden; Virginia, U.S.
- Died: October 12, 2006; Washington, D.C., U.S.
- Education: Virginia State College; Howard University School of Law; Georgetown University
- Occupation: Lawyer
- Spouse: Russell George Smith

Mabel Rebecca Dole Haden (1900s or 1910s – October 12, 2006) was an American lawyer. A native of the Piedmont region of Virginia, she became the first Black woman to obtain a Master of Laws degree from Georgetown University in 1956. She became one of the first Black woman lawyers in Washington, D.C., and she was co-founder and president of the Association of Black Women Attorneys.

== Biography ==
Mabel Rebecca Dole Haden, the eighth of eleven children, was born (Note: Joe Holley's Washington Post obituary states that Haden "was born near Lynch Station, Va., on Feb. 17, 1909, or perhaps in 1904. (Census records are unclear, and she occasionally told people she was born in 1914.)") in southern Virginia, nearby the unincorporated community of Lynch Station, and raised in Lynchburg. After attending Agenda Elementary (the only local Black elementary school) in Lynch Station, she graduated from Allen Home School, an all-Black boarding school in Asheville, North Carolina where all of her sisters studied, before attending the Barber-Scotia School for Girls and Pittsylvania County High School, where she also graduated.

She worked in Campbell County, Virginia, the Danville area, and later Fairfax County, Virginia and Washington, D.C. as a schoolteacher, as well as a nanny in the latter city. Despite her initial financial difficulties, she still wanted to go to college, so she obtained another high school diploma and studied at Howard University. When she could not afford tuition for her final semester, she decided to transfer to Virginia State College at the advice of Michael Joseph Ready, whom she met while she worked at a Catholic social services agency; she graduated there with a BS in Education.

She eventually returned to Howard, obtaining her law degree in 1948 from the School of Law as class president. She then quit teaching to become a lawyer, and in 1956 she become the first Black woman to obtain a Master of Laws degree from Georgetown University, while she and Helen Steinbinder were the first women overall to do so.

She was one of the first Black women lawyers to practice in Washington, D.C. Originally working in criminal defense, she later changed her specialization to civil law, In 1956, she opened her own private practice, while also working as a realtor because of her originally low clientele. Other highlights of her law career included a successful lawsuit against an ordinance restricting the city's popcorn vendors in 1987, as well as being one of the first lawyers to provide support for mayor Sharon Pratt. She wrote for ABA Journal, Legal Times, and The Washington Post. She once donated a collection of old law books to the Lorton Reformatory.

She co-founded the Association of Black Women Attorneys (ABWA), serving as their president. At the ABWA, she expanded recruitment to the law profession for women, including non-law practitioners, and presided over law scholarship distribution and the formation of their yearly Red Dress Ball event. Additionally, her supporters included Shirley Chisholm and Lionel Hampton.

She was inducted into the National Bar Association Hall of Fame in 1992. In 1997, she was awarded the Washington Bar Association Charles Hamilton Houston Medallion of Merit. She was a contributor to Rebels in Law, a 1998 edited volume on black woman lawyers.

She was also a poet, and one of her poems, "Black Hands", appeared on one of the ABWA's shirts. She also reportedly enjoyed music and dancing, with one particular artist of interest to her being Johnny Mathis.

In the 1950s, she married Englishman Russell George Smith. She died on October 12, 2006, at Providence Hospital in Washington, D.C. from cardiac arrest.
