= Bean Hill Historic District =

Historic district in Connecticut

- U.S. National Register of Historic Places
- U.S. Historic district
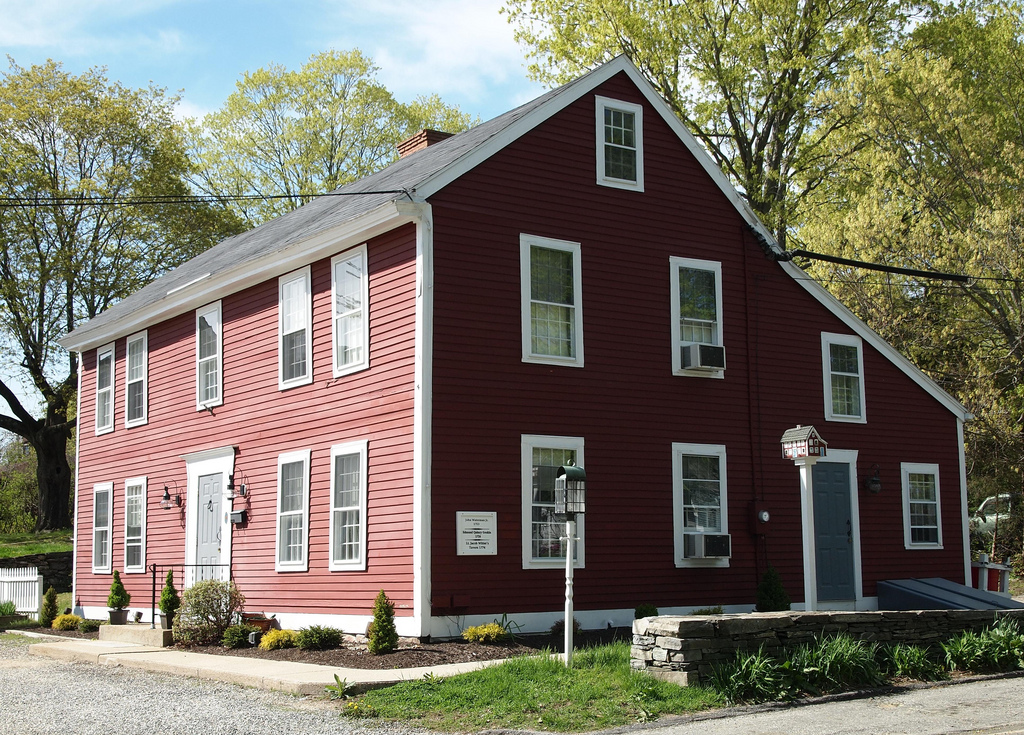
- The Edmund Goo(d)kin House, built 1738 or earlier

- Location within Connecticut Location within the United States
- Location: Huntington and Vergason Avenues, Sylvia Lane and West Town Street, Norwich, Connecticut
- Coordinates: 41°33′24″N 72°6′36″W
- Area: 22 acres (8.9 ha)
- Architect: Multiple
- Architectural style: Greek Revival, Late Victorian
- NRHP reference No.: 82001006
- Added to NRHP: December 8, 1982

The Bean Hill Historic District is in Norwich, Connecticut, listed on the National Register of Historic Places in 1982. It consists of a well-preserved collection of buildings on the Bean Hill Green which capture the 19th-century period when Bean Hill was a center for manufacturing and commercial activity. The district is located in the vicinity of West Town Street (old Route 2) between I-395 and Connecticut Avenue, and it also extends northeast along Huntington Avenue to include properties beyond Bean Hill Plain. The district is about 22 acres (8.9 ha) in size, with 23 contributing buildings.

The Bean Hill Green is a square parcel of open space bounded by Vegason Avenue, Huntington Avenue, and West Town Street. It was laid out in 1729, forming the centerpiece of a residential nucleus. The buildings facing the green include four houses from the 18th century, as well as the former 1833 Bean Hill Methodist Church, the first Methodist church in Norwich.

== See also ==
- Neighborhoods of Norwich, Connecticut
- National Register of Historic Places listings in New London County, Connecticut
