= Vincent Reed =

Vincent E. Reed (March 1, 1928 – October 17, 2017) was an American educator who served as superintendent of the District of Columbia Public Schools. He gained national recognition in the 1970s for his leadership of the school district. He subsequently served as assistant secretary of education under President Ronald Reagan.

Reed was the first African American principal of Woodrow Wilson High School, which was renamed Jackson-Reed High School in 2022 to honor him and Edna Burke Jackson, the school's first Black teacher.

== Early life and education ==
Vincent Reed was born in 1928 in St. Louis, as one of 17 children.

In his youth, Reed played football and boxed, becoming a Golden Gloves champion. He also served as an officer in the U.S. Army during the Korean War. He earned a degree in physical education from West Virginia State College in 1952. He would later graduate with a master's in educational administration from Howard University in 1965.

== Career ==
After a stint as a football coach at West Virginia State, in 1956, Reed began working for the District of Columbia Public Schools as a shop teacher. He went on to become a school administrator, and in 1968 he was named principal of Woodrow Wilson High School, the first African American to oversee what was then a predominantly white institution.

Reed was promoted to assistant superintendent of D.C. Public Schools, and then, in 1975, he was elevated to superintendent. He gained national recognition for his leadership of the district, under which test scores rose, and was known historically as one of the city's most popular superintendents. He left the position in 1980 amid disputes with members of the school board.

From 1981 to 1982, Reed served as assistant secretary for elementary and secondary education under President Ronald Reagan, becoming one of the highest-ranking Black members of the administration.

At the end of his career, he spent 16 years as vice president for communications at the Washington Post, retiring in 1998.

== Death and legacy ==
Reed died in 2017, in Washington, at age 89.

In 2022, Wilson High School, where Reed had served as the school's first African American principal, was renamed Jackson-Reed High School in honor of him and of Edna Burke Jackson, the school's first Black teacher.
