= Zinora Mitchell-Rankin =

American judge (born 1956)

Senior Judge on the Superior Court of the District of Columbia
- Incumbent
- Assumed office February 29, 2012

Associate Judge of the Superior Court of the District of Columbia
- In office January 12, 1990 – February 29, 2012
- President: George H. W. Bush
- Preceded by: Reggie Walton
- Succeeded by: Kimberley S. Knowles

Personal details
- Born: April 16, 1956 (age 68); Washington D.C., U.S.
- Spouse: Michael Rankin
- Children: 4
- Education: Spelman College (BA); George Washington University Law School (JD)

Zinora M. Mitchell-Rankin (born April 16, 1956) is a senior judge on the Superior Court of the District of Columbia.

== Education and career ==
Mitchell-Rankin earned her Bachelor of Arts from Spelman College in 1976 and her Juris Doctor from George Washington University Law School in 1979.

After graduating, she joined the Justice Department as a trial attorney.

=== D.C. superior court ===
President George H. W. Bush nominated Mitchell-Rankin on September 29, 1989, to a 15-year term as an associate judge on the Superior Court of the District of Columbia to the seat vacated by Reggie Barnett Walton. On November 16, 1989, the Senate Committee on Homeland Security and Governmental Affairs held a hearing on her nomination. On November 17, 1989, the Committee reported her nomination favorably to the Senate floor. November 19, 1989, the full Senate confirmed her nomination by voice vote. Mitchell-Rankin served as an associate judge from until January 12, 1990 until February 29, 2012. As of 2019, she serves as a senior judge on the court.

== Personal life ==
Mitchell-Rankin was born and raised in Washington D.C. She is married to fellow D.C. Superior Court judge Michael Rankin and they have four children.

== See also ==
- List of first women lawyers and judges in Washington D.C.
