= Edna Burke Jackson =

American educator

- Born: January 25, 1911; Washington, D.C., U.S.
- Died: February 21, 2004 (aged 93); Washington, D.C., U.S.
- Education: Howard University (BA, MEd)

Edna Burke Jackson (January 25, 1911 – February 21, 2004) was an American educator and writer. She was the first African American woman to teach at what was then Woodrow Wilson High School in Washington, D.C. In 2022, the school was renamed Jackson-Reed High School to honor her and Vincent Reed, Wilson's first Black principal.

== Biography ==
Edna Burke Jackson was born in 1911 in Washington, D.C. The oldest of four children, Jackson excelled academically from a young age. In 1928, she graduated as valedictorian from Dunbar High School, a prestigious public high school for African American students, where she had served as editor in chief of the student newspaper.

She studied Romance languages, particularly French, and social studies at Howard University on a four-year scholarship that she won by placing second in an Elks Oratorical Contest. After three years at Howard, she graduated early. She was invited by the civil rights activist and educator Mary McLeod Bethune to teach at her institution in Florida, now Bethune–Cookman University, but declined. Instead, she stayed at Howard to obtain a master's degree in education. Later in her career, she would continue her education during the summers at Howard, Catholic University, and Cornell University.

In 1934, unable to find work as a teacher in Washington, she moved to Tulsa, Oklahoma, to work at Booker T. Washington High School. She founded and led the school's Language Department.

After six years in Tulsa, she returned to Washington to become a teacher at Cardozo High School. In 1954, she and chemistry teacher Archie Lucas were hired as the first Black teachers at the high-ranking, all-white Woodrow Wilson High School. While the six other public high schools in the District of Columbia desegregated that year, Wilson remained all-white until September 1955. In her early years at Wilson, her white colleagues refused to sit with her at lunch and would use the n-word around her.

Jackson worked at Wilson for more than two decades, teaching European and world history. She advocated for further integration and for the incorporation of Black studies courses into the school's curriculum. She retired in 1976.

In addition to teaching, Jackson was a writer, first publishing a weekly column in a prominent Black newspaper, the Oklahoma Eagle, while living in Tulsa in the 1930s. From 1959 to 1970, she wrote book reviews for the Journal of Negro History. She was also deeply involved in volunteer work with the African Methodist Episcopal Church, among other organizations.

She died in 2004 at age 93.

== High school namesake ==
By 2020, the formerly segregated Wilson High School had become the District's most diverse public high school. Advocates had long pushed for the school to be renamed, as its namesake, President Woodrow Wilson, was an avowed segregationist. In 2020, as the Black Lives Matter movement drove a national conversation around renaming monuments and buildings, the district government acquiesced, agreeing to change the school's name.

Among the potential new names were August Wilson, Hilda Mason, Marion Barry, Northwest, Vincent E. Reed, and William Syphax. But advocates began coalescing around Edna B. Jackson, which had been suggested various times in the past, in honor of her role as a trailblazing Black educator at the school. The school's student paper endorsed this choice, arguing, "As a Black woman, Jackson’s intersectional identity is the antithesis of President Wilson's. Her legacy is uniquely intertwined with our school's past endeavors for equality."

In April 2021, the District's schools chancellor announced a formal proposal to rename the school after the playwright August Wilson, pending approval of the D.C. Council. However, advocates argued the council should reject the proposal, given the playwright's lack of strong connections to the Washington area.

In December, the council voted to rename it Jackson-Reed High School to honor both Jackson and Vincent E. Reed, the school's first Black principal. The name change went into effect on March 15, 2022, making Jackson the first female namesake of a D.C. public high school.
