= State schools for people with disabilities =

State schools are a type of institution for people with intellectual and developmental disabilities in the United States. These institutions are run by individual states. These state schools were and are famous for abuse and neglect. In many states, the residents were involuntary sterilized during the eugenics era. Many states have closed state schools as part of the deinstitutionalisation movement.

== History ==
=== Hopes of reformers ===
Many progressive reformers in the mid-1800s noticed the horrible conditions experienced by people with disabilities and wanted to improve them. Many people with disabilities were put in prison or poorhouses.

Dorothea Dix described:

More than nine-thousand idiots, epileptics, and insane in these United States, destitute of appropriate care and protection. Bound with galling chains, bowed beneath fetters and heavy iron balls, attached to drag-chains, lacerated with ropes, scourged with rods, and terrified beneath storms of profane execrations and cruel blows; now subject to jibes, and scorn, and torturing tricks, now abandoned to the most loathsome necessities or subject to the vilest and most outrageous violations.

Samuel Gridley-Howe and other reformers wanted to establish training schools where people with intellectual disabilities could learn and be prepared for society.

The history of state schools and psychiatric hospitals are linked throughout history. State schools started being built in the United States in the 1850s. People often used the term "feeble-minded" which could apply to both intellectual and developmental disabilities and mental illness, or in some cases, perceived sexual promiscuity.

=== Establishment ===
In 1848 Howe founded the Massachusetts School for Idiotic and Feeble-Minded Youth, a private boarding school for people with intellectual disabilities. In that same year, Hervey Wilbur founded a private school in his home in New York. Both schools taught according to the teachings of Édouard Séguin. These early training schools sought to educate students and provide schooling, assistance with self-care tasks and physical training.

The first state-funded school was the New York Asylum for Idiots. It was established in Albany in 1851. This state school aimed to educate children with intellectual disabilities and was reportedly successful in doing so. The school's Board of Trustees declared, in 1853, that the experiment had "entirely and fully succeeded." That success led the New York state legislature to found another building, which opened in Syracuse in 1855. The superintendent of this school for the next 32 years was Hervey Wilbur. In 1852, a school for "feeble-minded" youth opened in Germantown, Pennsylvania, and another in Columbus, Ohio in 1857.

While the number of schools continued to increase, the amount of training did not. These "schools" soon became custodial institutions, places to house people to keep them out of society. Rather than preparing students to join the community, these schools only trained people to do work in an institution setting. The residents that were able were put to work in the institution. Institutions began to argue for funding, saying that they are housing people that would otherwise be in almshouses or poorhouses. These larger custodial institutions were established in many states in the following decades.

==== Schools, colonies and farms ====
Training schools sought to train people with intellectual and developmental disabilities, even if that aim was almost never followed through. Other models of institutions also arose, but all of them were often called state schools.

Superintendents of institutions believed that people with different disabilities should be separated. Often, institutions would establish separate buildings, such as an "epileptic colony" and places for "high-grades," which was the term used to refer to people with disabilities who were forced to work in institutions. One specific way people were forced to work were farm colonies. People would purchase cheap rural farm land and force the residents to work on the farm growing food and harvesting dairy products. The food produced was either used for the institutions or sold. Many institutions sought to develop self-sufficiency. This was another way to keep people with disabilities separated from society.

=== Eugenics ===
These large custodial institutions continued to be built into the 20th century. At the same time, eugenics began to gain proponents throughout the United States, as well as Europe. Eugenics centered around the aim to increase the "genetic quality" of the human race. Eugenicists decided that some traits were "undesirable." One of the primary undesirable traits was "feeble-mindedness." Scientists and doctors became much less concern with teaching or training people with disabilities and focused more on separating them from society, stopping them from reproducing, and in some cases, advocating for their murder.

Many eugenicists thought that white Western Europeans were superior to other races and peoples. They developed extremely flawed measures to "prove" this superiority. The Stanford-Binet IQ test was developed to identify people who were feeble-minded. In 1913 the United States Public Health Service administered the newly invented Binet IQ test to immigrants arriving at Ellis Island. Professional researchers recorded that "79% of the Italians, 80% of the Hungarians, 83% of the Jews, and 87% of the Russians are feeble-minded." These findings, as well as others, were used to justify racism and anti-immigrant xenophobia in the United States and Europe.

In addition, new compulsory public school laws required children to attend school. Teachers had more chances to notice people who struggled and recommend them for an institution. Eugenics proponents also taught classes to teachers on identifying the "feeble-minded."

Throughout this era, the most popular belief was that intellectual and developmental disabilities, as well as mental illness, were entirely genetic and resulted in poverty, drunkenness, sexual promiscuity, crime, violence, and other social ills. People with disabilities were considered "menaces." Dr. Henry Goddard, a psychologist at Vineland Training School in New Jersey, wrote a book claiming that they investigated the family history of a woman at the institution and demonstrated that "feeble-mindedness" was genetic and caused all of social ills. Goddard said,

"There are Kallikak families all about us. They are multiplying at twice the rate of the general population, and not until we recognize this fact, and work on this basis, will we begin to solve [our] social problems."

Painting so many people as a threat led to increasing numbers of people sent to institutions. Institutions became even more overcrowded. Superintendents, concerned about overcrowding and of the "threat" of people with disabilities having children, started to sterilize the inmates. Many of those sterilized against their will were living in state schools or state hospitals. Over thirty states had compulsory sterilization laws and over 60,000 people with disabilities were sterilized.

Buck v. Bell, the infamous Supreme Court case that legalized involuntarily sterilization, was about Carrie Buck, a woman diagnosed as "feeble-minded" after she was raped by her foster brother and put into an institution. A family tree (that was later shown to be falsified) said that she was the third generation diagnosed with feeble-mindedness. US Supreme Court Justice Oliver Wendell Holmes Jr. famously declared "three generations of imbeciles are enough!"

American eugenicists would go onto serve as a model for Nazi Germany to replicate as they sought to institutionalize, sterilize, and murder the "undesirables" in their own country.

== Lists of state schools ==
=== Alabama ===
- Bryce State Hospital *Served inmates with I/DD until Partlow opened
- Searcy Hospital *Served inmates with I/DD until Partlow opened
- Partlow State School and Hospital, Tuscaloosa (1919–2011)
- Lurleen Wallace Developmental Center, Decatur (1971–2003)
- J.S. Tarwater Developmental Center, Wetumpka (1976–2004)
- Albert P. Brewer Developmental Center, Mobile (1973–2001) In 2001, residents were moved to different buildings in Daphne.
  - Albert Brewer-Bayside Developmental Center, Daphne (−2004)
- Glenn Ireland Developmental Center, Birmingham (1986–1996)

=== Alaska ===
- Morningside Hospital, Portland, Oregon (1904–1960s) In the 1960s, residents were moved to Harborview Center.
- Baby Louise Haven, Salem, Oregon (−1960s) In the 1960s, residents were moved to Harborview Center.
- Harborview Developmental Center, Valdez (1960–1997)

=== Arizona ===
- Arizona State Hospital, Phoenix (1887–1985) After 1985, residents were placed in the community.
- Arizona Training Program, Coolidge (1952–present)
- Arizona Training Program, Tucson (1973–1997)
- Arizona Training Program, Phoenix (1973–1988)

=== Arkansas ===
- Arkansas State Hospital (1888–1959) In 1959, people with I/DD started to be moved to other facilities
- Arkansas Children's Colony/Conway Human Development Center (1959–present)
- Arkadelphia Human Development Center (1968–present)
- Booneville Human Development Center (1973–present)
- Jonesboro Human Development Center (1974–present)
- Southeast Arkansas Human Development Center (1978–present)
- Alexander Human Development Center (–2011)

=== California ===
- Sonoma State Home (1883–2018)
- Lanterman State Hospital and Developmental Center (1921–2015)
- Agnews State Mental Hospital (1885–2011)
- Camarillo State Mental Hospital (1936–1997)
- Fairview Developmental Center, Costa Mesa (1959–present)
- Porterville Developmental Center (1953–present)
- Canyon Springs Developmental Center (2000–present)
- Sierra Vista, Yuba City (2000–2010)

=== Colorado ===
- Colorado State Home and Training School/Ridge Home (1909–1992)
- Colorado State Hospital/Pueblo Regional Center (–present)
- State Home for Mental Defectives/Grand Junction Regional Center (1921–present)
- Wheat Ridge Regional Center (1912–present)

=== Connecticut ===
- Southbury Training School (1930s–present)
- Mansfield State Training School and Hospital (1860–1993)

=== Delaware ===
- Stockley Center Hospital for the Mentally Retarded, Stockley (1921–present)

=== District of Columbia ===
- Forest Haven, Laurel, Maryland (1922–1991)
- DC Village (1906–1996)
- St Elizabeths Hospital (1852–1906, 1987-1994) *Specifically for people with mental illness, but had an almshouse that served people with I/DD, before DC Village opened, and had a program for people with DD from 1987-1994.

=== Florida ===
- Florida Farm Colony for Epileptic and Feeble-Minded/Sunland Training Center Gainesville/Tacachale (1921–present)
- Sunland Training Center Fort Meyer/Gulf Coast Center (1960-2010)
- Sunland Training Center Orlando (early 1960s-1985)
- Sunland Training Center Marianna (1960s–present)
- Sunland Training Center Miami/Landmark Learning Center (1966-2005)
- Sunland Training Center Tallahassee (-1983)
- Sunland Training Center Dorr Field (1968-1969)

=== Georgia ===
- Gracewood State School and Hospital (1921–present)
- Central State Hospital, Milledgeville (1842–present)

=== Hawaii ===
- Waimano Training School and Hospital (1919–1999)

=== Idaho ===
- Idaho State School and Hospital (1918-2021)

=== Illinois ===
- Lincoln State School and Colony (1877-2002)
- Dixon State School (1918-1983)
- Jacksonville Developmental Center (1974*-2012) *Before 1974, the facility only included people with mental illness.
- Howe State School (1973-2010)
- Choate Developmental & Mental Health Center
- Ludeman Developmental Center
- Fox Developmental Center
- Mabley Developmental Center, Dixon (1987–present)
- Kiley Developmental Center
- Murray Developmental Center
- Shapiro Developmental Center

=== Indiana ===
- Fort Wayne State School for Feeble Minded Youth (1890–2007)
- Muscatatuck Colony (1920–2005)

=== Iowa ===
- Institution for Feebleminded Children at Glenwood (1876–present)
- The Hospital for Epileptics and Feebleminded at Woodward (1917)

=== Kansas ===
- Winfield State Hospital, Winfield (1888–1988)

=== Kentucky ===
- Frankfort State Hospital & School (1860–1972). Originally named The Kentucky State Institute for the Education of Feeble-Minded Children and Idiots, renamed in the 1940s to Kentucky Training Home, and around 1963 to Frankfort State Hospital & School.

=== Louisiana ===
- State Colony and Training School, Pineville

=== Maine ===
- Pineland Center, New Gloucester (1909–1996)

=== Maryland ===
- Crownsville Hospital Center (1911–2004)
- Forest Haven (1925–1991)
- Rosewood Center (1888–2009)

=== Massachusetts ===
- Walter E. Fernald State School, Waltham (1848–2014)
- Templeton Farm Colony, Baldwinsville (1899–2015)
- Wrentham State School (1910–present)
- Belchertown State School, Belchertown (1922–1992)
- Monson Developmental Center (1898-2012)
- Berry Regional Center (1967-1994)
- Glavin Regional Center (1974-2013)
- Paul A. Dever Regional Center (1946-2001)
- Hogan Regional Center (1967)

=== Michigan ===
- Michigan Home for Feebleminded and Epileptics/Lapeer State Home/Oakdale Regional Center (1895–1991)
- Newberry Regional Mental Health Center- Developmental Services (-1992)
- Michigan Farm Colony for Epileptics/Caro Regional Mental Health Center, Wahjamega/Caro (1914–present)
- Wayne County Training School, Northville Township (1926–1974)
- Coldwater Regional Center for Developmental Disabilities (1935-1987)
- Mount Pleasant Center (1937-2009)
- Fort Custer State Home (1956-1972)
- Hillcrest Regional Center for Developmental Disabilities (1959-1982)
- Alpine Regional Center for Developmental Disabilities (1960-1981)
- Macomb-Oakland Regional Center for Developmental Disabilities (1967-1989)
- Muskegon Regional Center for Developmental Disabilities (1969-1992)
- Northville Residential Training Center (1972-1983)
- Southgate Regional Center (1977-2002)
- Plymouth Center for Human Development

=== Minnesota ===
- Faribault School for the Feeble-Minded and Colony of Epileptics, Faribault (1879–1998)

=== Mississippi ===
- Mississippi State Hospital (1855*–present) *The Mississippi State Hospital also institutionalized people with I/DD, before Ellisville opened and before Ellisville accepted women and Black people.
- Ellisville State School (1921–present)
- North Mississippi Regional Center, Oxford (1973–present)
- Hudspeth Regional Center, Whitfield (1974–present)
- Boswell Regional Center, Magee (1976–present)
- South Mississippi Regional Center, Long Beach (1978–present)
- Mississippi Adolescent Center, Brookhaven (2011–present)

=== Missouri ===
- Fulton State Hospital (1847–present)

Missouri State Colony for Feebleminded and Epileptic/Missouri State School (1899–present), split into the following three state schools in 1959

- Marshall State School and Hospital
- Carrollton State School and Hospital
- Higginsville State School and Hospital
- St. Louis Training School/St Louis State School and Hospital (1922)

=== Montana ===
- Montana State Training School, Boulder (1905–2017)
- Eastmont Human Services Center (1969-2003)

=== Nebraska ===
- Beatrice State Home (1885–present)

=== Nevada ===
- Nevada State Hospital/Nevada State School and Hospital/Nevada Habilitation Center (1887–2012)

=== New Hampshire ===
- Laconia State School (1901–1991)

=== New Jersey ===
- Vineland Training School (1887–present)
- New Jersey State Colony for Epileptics/North Princeton Center (1898-1998)
- Johnstone Training and Research Center
- New Lisbon Developmental Center (1914)
- Woodbine Developmental Center (1921)
- North Jersey Developmental Center (1928-2014)
- Woodbridge Developmental Center (1965)
- Hunterdon Developmental Center (1969)

=== New Mexico ===
- Fort Stanton State Hospital for the Developmentally Handicapped (1960s–1995)
- Los Lunas Hospital and Training School (1929–1997)
- Villa Solano (1973–1975)

=== New York ===
- Syracuse State School, Syracuse (1855–1998)
- New York Custodial Asylum for Feeble-Minded Women, Newark, New York (1878)
- Rome State Custodial Asylum for Un-Teachable Idiots, Rome (1894)
- Craig Colony for Epileptics, Sonyea (1894–1968)
- Letchworth Village (1912-1996)
- Willowbrook State School, Staten Island (1947–1987)
- Wassaic State School, Wassaic (1931-2013)

=== North Carolina ===
- Caswell Training School
- O'Berry School (1957–present)
- North Carolina Farm Colony

=== North Dakota ===
- Grafton State School

=== Ohio ===
- Ohio Asylum for the Education of Idiotic and Imbecile Youth, Columbus (1857)
- Broadview Developmental Center
- Warrensville Developmental Center
- Northwest Ohio Developmental Center

=== Oklahoma ===
- Enid State School (1909–2014)
- Pauls Valley State School (1907–2015)
- Hissom Memorial Center (1961)
- Taft State Hospital
- Greer Center (1989–present)

=== Oregon ===
- Fairview Training Center

=== Pennsylvania ===
- Pennhurst State School and Hospital, Spring City (1903–1987)
- Elwyn Training School

=== Rhode Island ===
- Ladd School/Ladd Center (1908–1986)

=== South Carolina ===
- State Training School for the Feeble-minded/Whitten Center (1918–present)

=== South Dakota ===
- Redfield State School and Home for the Feeble Minded/South Dakota Developmental Center (1899–present)

=== Tennessee ===
- Tennessee Home and Training School for Feeble-Minded Persons/Clover Bottom Development Center, Donelson (1923–2015)
- Greene Valley Developmental Center (1962–2017)
- Arlington Developmental Center (1968–2010)
- Nat T. Winston Developmental Center (−1998)

=== Texas ===
- Austin State School/Austin State Supported Living Center (1915–present)
- Austin State School Farm Colony/Travis State School (1933–1996)
- Fort Worth State School
- Abilene State Supported Living Center (Abilene SSLC)
- Brenham SSLC
- Corpus Christi SSLC
- Denton SSLC
- El Paso SSLC
- Lubbock SSLC
- Lufkin SSLC
- Mexia SSLC
- Richmond SSLC
- Rio Grande SSLC
- San Angelo SSLC
- San Antonio SSLC

=== Utah ===
- Utah State Training School (1929–present)

=== Vermont ===
- Brandon State School (1915–1993)

=== Virginia ===
- State Colony for Epileptics and Feebleminded/Central Virginia Training Center (1910–2020)
- Central State Hospital (1870–present)

=== Washington ===
- Eastern State Custodial School/Lakeland Village in Medical Lake (1905–present)
- Western State Custodial School/Rainier State School in Buckley (1939–present)
- Yakima Valley School in Selah (1958–present)

=== Wisconsin ===
- Wisconsin Home for the Feeble-Minded/Northern Wisconsin Center for the Developmentally Disabled (1897–present)

=== Wyoming ===
- Wyoming State Training School/Wyoming Life Resource Center, Lander (1912)

== See also ==
- List of institutions providing special education facilities
