= Frank Giroux case =

1907 US asylum incident

Frank Robert Giroux (October 28, 1890 – November 15, 1909) was an American teenager who suffered from epilepsy and was severely injured in December 1907 while institutionalized at the Illinois Asylum for Feeble-Minded Children in Lincoln, Illinois. Complaints by his parents led to a scandal, and the state legislature conducted an investigation into all public residential institutions. This investigation uncovered cases of abuse and neglect, and led to some improvements.

== Background ==
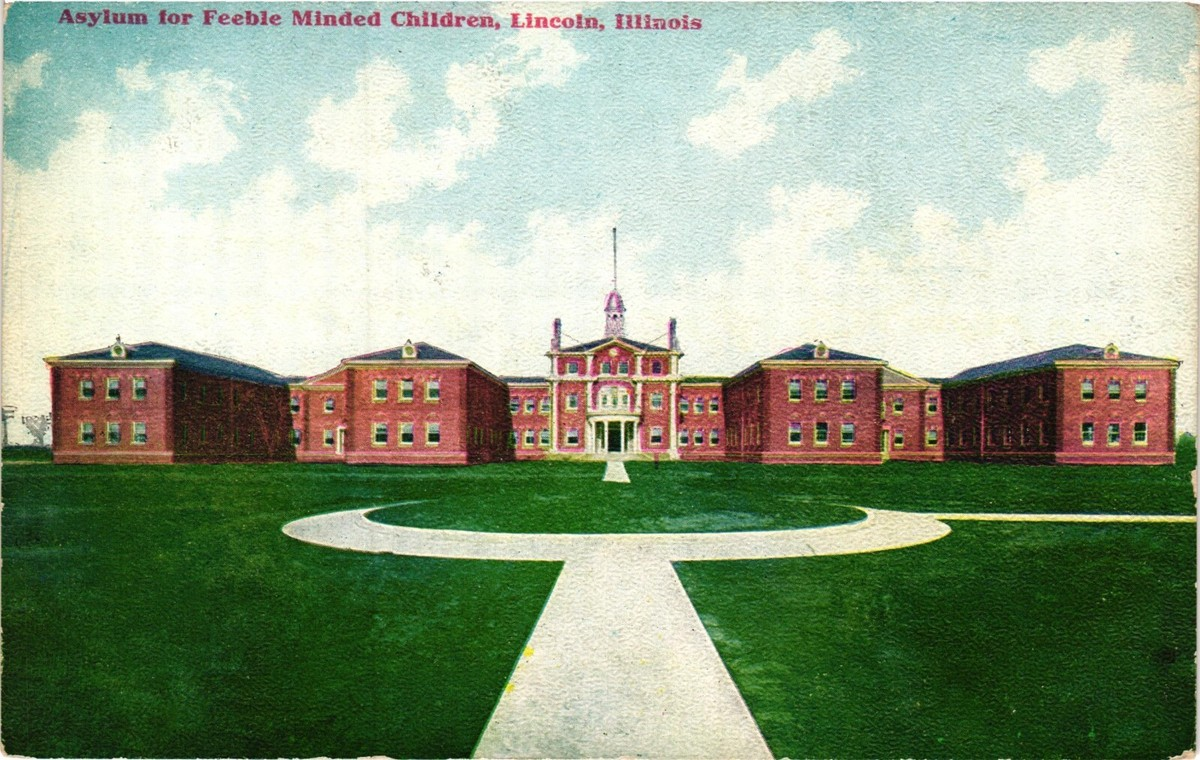
The Illinois Asylum for Feeble-Minded Children in 1909

Giroux was one of two sons of Benjamin Giroux, a Chicago theatrical agent, and his wife Ida, née Greenquist. Benjamin Giroux was the manager of the Criterion Theatre until 1909, when he started his own Lyric Theatre. Frank Giroux began to have epileptic seizures when he was one year old and was later also diagnosed with an intellectual disability, (Note: Under the classification system at the time, he was termed a "low-grade imbecile".) and required continuing care from his mother. On December 4, 1907, when he was 17, his parents placed him in the Illinois Asylum for Feeble-Minded Children, later known as the Lincoln Developmental Center, at the urging of their family doctor.

== Injury ==
On the evening of December 23, 1907, while unsupervised, Giroux fell against a hot radiator, presumably as a result of a seizure. An attendant found him several minutes later, by which time his left ear, neck, and face had been burned. The matron sent him to the infirmary, where he was treated by two doctors who said the burns were minor. The superintendent, Harry G. Hardt, sent a telegram to Giroux's parents, but his father arrived the next day on an early train with Christmas presents for him and others on the ward, having missed the message. The following day, his mother visited, and in early January his parents took him back to Chicago. Physicians there found his burns were serious and had been very inadequately treated.

== Scandal and investigations ==
Giroux's father complained to his state representative, John W. Hill, a leading opponent of the governor, Charles Deneen, who had appointed Hardt as superintendent of the state asylum and who was seeking reelection that year. The press covered the case as a scandal, repeating the criticism of the medical treatment provided to Giroux at the asylum, and in March 1908, Harriet Hook, one of the doctors there who had treated him, was arrested and appeared in court charged with disorderly conduct after gaining entry to the Giroux residence in disguise, pretending to be a reporter. She said that she had wanted to verify whether her treatment had been incorrect. Hook was fined but in late 1909 the verdict was vacated by the court of appeals, and in 1910 she sued Giroux's parents and two police officers for false arrest and imprisonment. In July 1908, Giroux's mother confronted Governor Deneen at a stump speech and called him a liar when he told the crowd that her husband was being paid to make speeches attacking him.

An inquiry into Giroux's injury was conducted at the asylum on January 8, 1908 and absolved superintendent Hardt of responsibility. It was determined that a single attendant had been responsible for overseeing a ward housing 40 epileptic boys, and had left them unsupervised against the rules. The Board of State Commissioners of Public Charities, which supported Hardt and the governor as reformers, submitted a report on January 13 that exonerated the institution but recommended expediting the covering of all radiators, which had been occurring as a part of renovations.

On January 14, 1908, at Hill's urging, the Illinois State Legislature voted to empanel a committee of five to investigate "the cause of, and the responsibility for, the said injury, as well as of and for such cases brought before it indicating injury to or improper, negligent or incompetent treatment of the inmates of our state institutions." The committee was presided over by Hill, and included no one allied with the governor. The legislative investigation and the extensive press coverage were extraordinary for institutions for the mentally handicapped as opposed to insane asylums, and alarmed the American Association for the Study of the Feeble-Minded, which endorsed Hardt by electing him as its next president in 1909 and scheduling its 1910 convention to take place in Lincoln.

The committee submitted its report in early May 1908. No rebuttals or cross-examination of witnesses were allowed, and some testimony was dubious. A month of hearings that interviewed people associated with the Lincoln asylum coincided with a measles epidemic at the institution that killed four inmates and precluded an inspection. The interviews and the written reports that the committee required demonstrated that the great majority of injuries occurred during epileptic seizures, but also that staff were frequently careless, neglectful, and insensitive. Hardt was accused of covering up at least one incident of neglect and Governor Deneen of simply referring back to Hardt a letter concerning staff abuse from an inmate who later lost an arm in an accident, and the press reported that testimony alleged some doctors at the asylum were "dope fiends". Hook was said to have retained inmate body parts from autopsies and identified the inmates when she used them in anatomy lectures for attendants, which both the committee and the newspapers considered suggestive of ghoulish experimentation.

== Legacy ==
Implementing the recommendations of the investigative committee, the Illinois legislature centralized administration of state residential facilities, replacing their separate boards of trustees and the State Board of Charities with a five-member State Board of Institutions. By 1910, most of the institutions had introduced formal training for attendants, and by 1913, corporal punishment was being replaced by policy with disciplinary isolation. The report also recommended housing epileptics in a separate facility. A separate State Colony for Epileptics was opened at Dixon in 1918 but was unpopular with patients and their parents and in 1921 was opened to the intellectually disabled in order to alleviate overcrowding at Lincoln.

Frank Giroux died on November 15, 1909 at the Sisters of St. Francis in Jefferson, Wisconsin, and was buried in Rosehill Cemetery.
