= Forest Haven =

Former hospital in Maryland, US

Coordinates: 39°6′19″N 76°46′32″W

- Laurel, Maryland; United States

Information
- Established: 1925
- Closed: October 14, 1994

Forest Haven (previously the District Training School for the Mentally Retarded) was a state school and hospital for children and adults with intellectual disabilities located in Laurel, Maryland and operated by the District of Columbia. The site was opened in 1925 and closed on October 14, 1991, by order of a federal judge after years of physical and sexual abuse, medical incompetence, ten deaths from aspiration pneumonia, and hundreds of other deaths under suspicious circumstances.

== History ==
Forest Haven abuse cases
- Location: Forest Haven, Laurel, Maryland, U.S.
- Attack type: Physical abuse, patient abuse, patient neglect, medical malpractice, sexual abuse, homicide, theft
- Deaths: Over 400
- Victim: Patients at Forest Haven
- Perpetrator: Staff at Forest Haven
- Verdict: Taylor: Guilty
- Convictions: Taylor: Misappropriation, theft
- Sentence: Taylor: 5 years in prison
- Convicted: Lemuel L. Taylor
- Litigation: Civil suit against Forest Haven by families of victims settled for $1.075 million ($2,335,120 today)

Forest Haven opened in 1925 as a farm-like institution geared towards educating its patients with useful life skills. It encompassed nearly 300 acres and contained 22 separate buildings, and at its height housed well over one thousand patients. Its decline began in the 1960s as funding was cut and the population grew to include persons with non-intellectual disabilities, such as epilepsy. In 1974, Forest Haven received at least 20 individuals from a nearby orphanage, "Junior Village", which had closed. A lawsuit filed by families of patients at Forest Haven in 1976 and joined by the Department of Justice in 1978 resulted in the relocation of many residents to group homes, but the facility continued to operate, even allowing a physician with a suspended medical license to continue practicing there.

In 1981, staff member Lemuel L. Taylor was charged with misappropriation and theft after stealing over $40,000 ($86,888 today) from Forest Haven residents' bank accounts. In September 1981, a two-week trial commenced in which a jury convicted him, and he was sentenced to five years in prison. A Washington Post piece published in August 1982 reported that the victims of Taylor's theft had still not been reimbursed.

Between 1989 and 1991, the Justice Department began to monitor deaths at the facility from aspiration pneumonia, a condition that can be caused by improper feeding procedures in those who are immobile or have difficulty swallowing (e.g. feeding a patient who is lying down). In just those two years, a total of 10 of Forest Haven's roughly 200 remaining patients died from complications related to aspiration pneumonia. As indicated by city records and interviews, this was a problem that had dated back at to least 20 years before the monitoring began; it was found that the rate of deaths prior to that point had likely been similar. Former U.S. Assistant Attorney General for Civil Rights, John Dunne said, "Based on our various investigations around the country, there was no other institution of any kind in America where so many people died from abuse and neglect over such a short period of time."

There were also many accounts of rampant physical, mental, and sexual abuse at the facility. Prior residents have reported being hit with "belts, switches, and baseball bats." Missing teeth and other dental problems were commonly reported. Many of the residents who died there were buried in a mass grave, unmarked until a headstone – noting 389 individuals – was erected by some of the patients' families in 1987. Some of the graves have been uncovered by erosion.

On September 29, 1991, Forest Haven's last 15 residents were relocated, and the facility was closed.

In April 1994, families of six of the victims settled a lawsuit against Forest Haven for $1,075,000 ($2,335,120 today).

Today, the site is abandoned and is heavily guarded and patrolled by United States Park Police, but remains a popular attraction for urban explorers. Many hazardous items such as asbestos have been removed, but much of the equipment, including desks, beds, toys, and medical records remain.

== Timeline and history ==
Date	Event
1925	"District Training School for the Mentally Retarded" opens
1928	First on-grounds burial
1954	Thorazine becomes widely used in hospitals and institutions
1963	Institution name changes to "Forest Haven"
1967	Joy Evans court-ordered to Forest Haven
1971	Curley Building opened
1972	More than 100 job vacancies at Forest Haven reported
February 23, 1973	Evans v. Fenty lawsuit filed
1974	Nearby orphanage "Junior Village" closes, 20 children are relocated to Forest Haven
July 1976	Joy Evans dies (age 18)
1978	US Departement of Justice joins lawsuit Evans v. Fenty
1987	Families of patients construct a plaque to mark the 389 individuals buried in the mass grave
August 8.1989	Arkie, a resident since the age of 5, dies of aspiration pneumonia at the age of 22
1991	D.C. becomes the second jurisdiction to deinstitutionalize
September 29, 1991	Last resident relocated
October 14, 1991	Forest Haven officially closes
