= Arizona Training Program =

Program of state schools in Arizona

Arizona Training Program was a program of state schools for people with intellectual and developmental disabilities in the state of Arizona.

== History ==
In 1927, H.B. 50 authorizes the creation of the Arizona Children's Colony "for the care and education of mentally deficient children." In 1952, the Arizona Children's Colony was opened. Before 1952, Arizona State Hospital accepted people with I/DD as well as people with mental illness. Fay Arrington, a mother whose twin boys were two of the first patients accepted at the Children's Colony, relates that there were many families trying to get a spot. On the first day, 12 children were accepted. She relates that the floors were cement and the beds were in rows.

Ann Mills, a former resident of the Arizona Children's Colony, said on visit to celebrate 50 years since leaving the institution, "There used to be 14 people to a room and the beds were arranged side-by-side." She said the punishments were harsh and that, "If you were locked up, you would sleep on a room with nothing but a cement bed." Ann was sent to Arizona State Hospital at the age of 13 when her family could not afford to pay for her medication, three years later she was moved to the Children's Colony where she would stay until she was 30. At age 30, she left to Lara Turner Homes in Phoenix, a halfway house for adults with disabilities. She reports that,

"The grownups there [at the Children's Colony] told me I would be back before a week is up. They said I was mean and stubborn. I fooled them."

In 1962, the Arizona Children's Colony changed its policies to have adult residents. Prior to this, many residents were sent to the Arizona State Hospital when they became adults.

From 1970 to 1973, the Arizona Training Programs at Tucson and Phoenix were built.

In 1977, a class action lawsuit alleged horrible living conditions for residents of Arizona Training Program in Coolidge. At one time there were about 1,200 people crammed into a facility built for around 300. The Arizona Republic described it at the time, saying,

"The tumbledown buildings echoed with hostile shouts of pain and confusion. There were dressers without drawers, beds without blankets, sofas without cushions and restrooms without toilet paper. Residents were often drugged, locked in padded rooms or tied to their beds."

Part of the settlement of the case involved Independent Oversight Committees, where teams of volunteers would oversee the conditions at the training programs. The settlement also required the state reduce overcrowding, either moving patients to the community or to the other two training program locations.

In 1979, a legislative mandate forbids new residents of the Arizona Training Program at Tucson.

In 1988, the Arizona Training Program in Phoenix was closed and in 1997, the Arizona Training Program in Tucson was closed.
