= Qualified Intellectual Disability Professional =

A Qualified Intellectual Disability Professional, often referred to as a QIDP for short is a professional staff working with people in community homes who have intellectual and developmental disabilities and was previously known as a Qualified Mental Retardation Professional or QMRP. The change in terminology was implemented after the Centers for Medicaid and Medicare Services (CMS) modified the State Operations Manual Appendix J - Guidance to Surveyors: Intermediate Care Facilities for Individuals with Intellectual Disabilities The changes were implemented after President Obama signed Rosa's Law.

The National Association of QIDPs updated its name to meet the new change in terminology The organization provides training and meeting opportunities for those working in the QIDP capacity. Some U.S. states such as Illinois have specific and required training for QIDPs to remain certified. Other states have licensure and outline specific requirements for the QIDP such as California.

Most QIDPs work for specific organizations providing care and oversight in Intermediate Care Facilities for Individuals with Intellectual Disabilities. QIDP salary ranges can vary when working for agencies, with $72,000 being the high range and $38,000 being the average salary range.

== Qualifications ==
Under federal law, any person working as a QIDP is required to meet the minimum requirements outlined in "Appendix J, Survey Procedures And Interpretive Guidelines For Intermediate Care Facilities For Persons With Mental Retardation."

Appendix J (W160 through W163) requires a QIDP to have a bachelor's degree in human services or a related field of study, plus at least one year of experience working with people diagnosed as developmentally disabled. Registered nurses and physicians also qualify to serve as a QIDP.

Some states, including California, require a QIDP to be licensed to work in the state. Other states, including Texas (which has over 900 Intermediate Care Facility/DD homes) and Alabama, do not require licensing.

== Shifts in terminology ==
Qualified Mental Retardation Professional (QMRP) was the term first used in federal standards developed in the late 1970s and early 1980s for intermediate care facilities for developmentally disabled people.

In 2010, Rosa's Law changed the terminology from "Mental Retardation" to "Intellectual Disability."

This change prompted several states and organizations to change the designation of a QMRP to either "QDDP," meaning "Qualified Developmental Disability Professional," or "QIDP," meaning "Qualified Intellectual Disability Professional".

In December 2013, Centers for Medicare & Medicaid Services (CMS) formally updated Appendix J to change the language used to describe developmental disabilities.

It is possible that, as facilities start to phase out or convert to other programs (such as waiver-type settings) for people with disabilities, the terms QMRP, QDDP, and QIDP may be removed completely.

== Professional organizations ==
There are several professional organizations for QIDPs.

The most notable organization, NAQ (the National Association of QIDPs), holds annual meetings around the United States and offers a network for QIDPs to stay in contact with other disability professionals. There are also state-level organizations that provide training and resources to QIDPs.

Some organizations have started providing consulting services including training, standards, and reports such as the Private Provider's Association of Texas, and My QIDP.
