= Ann-Eve Mansfeld Johnson =

American politician and clubswoman

- Born: Ann-Eve Mansfeld; December 18, 1908; Tucson, Arizona
- Died: March 12, 1981 (aged 72)
- Education: University of Arizona

Ann-Eve Mansfeld Johnson (December 18, 1908- March 12, 1981) was an influential Arizona woman, active in politics, community service, and preservation.

== Biography ==
Ann-Eve Mansfeld was born on December 18, 1908, in Tucson, Arizona to Samuel J. Mansfeld and Vivian Chauncy Ainsworth. Her paternal grandfather, Jacob S. Mansfeld, had written Tucson’s first City Charter.

Mansfeld studied archaeology at the University of Arizona, where she served as secretary of the Student Body, President of Alpha Phi, and member of the Mortar Board. She received her bachelor's degree in archaeology in 1930.

In 1932, Mansfeld married her former classmate, Emery Crawford Johnson, with whom she had two children, JannaNeen and Peter.

In the 1950s, Ann-Eve Johnson served as the State Chairman of the Arizona Legislature Council. In this position, she lobbied to establish the Arizona Children’s Colony, now the Arizona Training Program. Once it opened, she served as its chair.

Johnson was president of the Junior League of Tucson and the Planned Parenthood Clinic of Tucson. She also co-founded the Family Service Agency and served on the Pima County Welfare Board. In 1950, Johnson was appointed the Arizona State Chairman of the White House Conference on Youth and Children. Her civic work included boosting well-baby clinics, prenatal clinics, and children's hospitals.

Johnson's family had been friends with Barry Goldwater's family for several generations. This friendship continued with Johnson and Barry Goldwater, who attended the University of Arizona together.

Johnson was active in the state and national Republican Party (United States). Dean Burch referred to her as "the epitome of the hard-driving lady Republican." From 1956 to 1962, Johnson served as the Republican national committeewoman from Arizona. She went on to be appointed to the national committee's executive committee. She later served as the Goldwater-for-President committee's Director of Women's Activities, in which she traveled around the country campaigning on Goldwater's behalf. When Elly M. Peterson left her position as Assistant Chairman of the Republican National Committee to run for the Senate, Goldwater chose Johnson to take the position. In this position, she coordinated the political activities of Goldwater's wife and traveled with her.

Johnson was an early leader in Arizona’s preservation movement. As the chairman of the Historical Sites Committee of the Arizona Pioneers’ Historical Society and a founding member of the Tucson Heritage Foundation, she contributed to saving buildings such as Old Fort Lowell, El Adobe Patio Buildings, and the John C. Freemont House. She also was co-chairman of the Committee to Restore Old Spanish Street Names.

Johnson died on March 12, 1981, in Tucson. The Junior League of Tucson honors a Sustaining member annually with the Ann-Eve Johnson Award.

== Awards ==
- 1958: Service Award, University of Arizona
- 1960: 75th Anniversary Award of Merit, University of Arizona
- 1974: Al Merito Award, Arizona State Historical Society
- 1976: Dona de la Casa
- 1979: Woman of the Year, Tucson Advertising Club
- 1987: Arizona Women's Hall of Fame
