= Jack Mabley =

American journalist (1915-2006

- Born: Jack Arnold Mabley; October 26, 1915; Binghamton, New York, US
- Died: January 6, 2006 (aged 90); Chicago, Illinois, US
- Education: University of Illinois Urbana-Champaign
- Occupations: Reporter, columnist
- Employers: Chicago Tribune; Chicago Daily Herald
- Spouse: Frances Habeck (1940–2006; his death)
- Children: 4

Jack Arnold Mabley (October 26, 1915 – January 6, 2006) was an American newspaper reporter and columnist.

== Early life and career ==
Mabley was born on October 26, 1915, in Binghamton, New York, to Clarence Ware Mabley (born Clarence Ware Mable) and Mabelle née Howe, a concert pianist.

After studying journalism at the University of Illinois Urbana-Champaign, where he was the editor of the Daily Illini his senior year, and graduating in 1938, Mabley worked for the City News Bureau, the Associated Press, and then as a reporter for the 'Chicago Daily News before serving four years as a U.S. Navy lieutenant during the war. He returned to the Daily News in 1948 as a columnist. He joined the Chicago American in 1961, and remained there as a columnist and associate editor until, now a tabloid known as Chicago Today, it folded in 1974.

Mabley then took up a long-standing post as the well-respected columnist of the Chicago Tribune, writing some 8,000 columns on a wide range of issues. In his later years he became columnist of the suburban Daily Herald from which he finally retired in 2004, at around 88 years.

In addition to his journalistic career, Mabley operated a corporate communications business from Chicago, hosting a nightly radio show. He also served as president of the Chicago suburb of Glenview for a number of years.

== Later career ==
The Jack Mabley Developmental Center, in Dixon, is a state run residential home for the mentally disabled that was named after him in honour of his generous support and fundraising activities. Mabley had created the Forgotten Children's Fund, which raised money for the center. His autobiography entitled "Halas, Hef, the Beatles and Me" was published in 1967.

== Death ==
Mabley died in Chicago on January 6, 2006. He had married Frances Habeck on August 29, 1940, and had four children.
