= XYYYY syndrome =

Rare chromosomal disorder

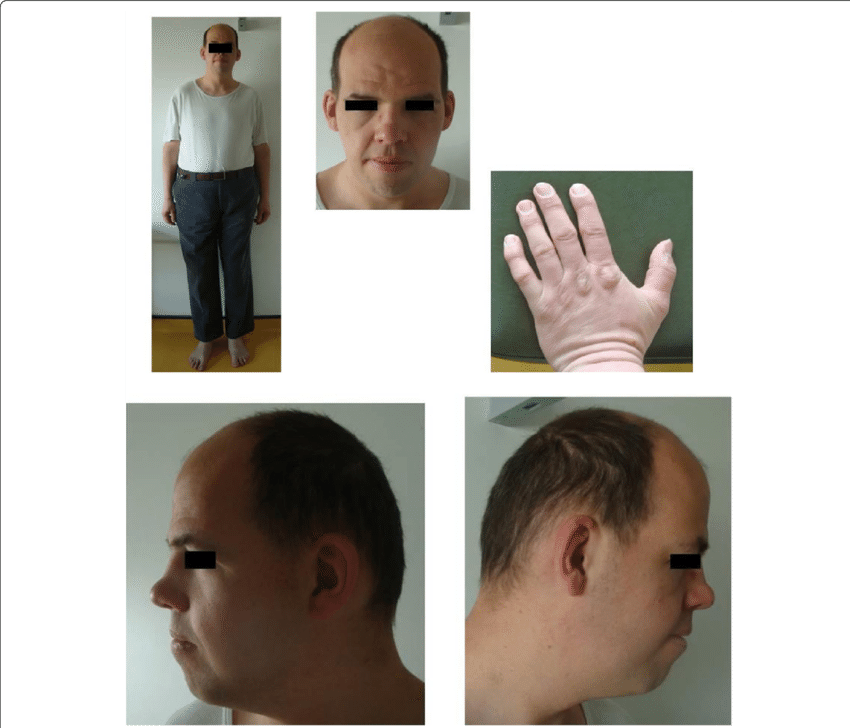
Man with XYYYY syndrome

XYYYY syndrome, also known as 49,XYYYY, is an exceptionally rare chromosomal disorder in which a male human has three additional copies of the Y chromosome. Only seven non-mosaic cases of the disorder have ever been recorded in the medical literature, as well as five mosaic cases, of which two had more 48,XYYY than 49,XYYYY cells. Due to the extreme rarity of the disorder, little is understood about it, and the phenotype appears to be variable.

== Phenotype ==
XYYYY syndrome is associated with developmental and skeletal anomalies that are also observed in other sex chromosome aneuploidies. Findings associated with the karyotype include hypertelorism (wide-spaced eyes), low-set ears, radioulnar synostosis (fusion of the long bones in the forearm), and clinodactyly (incurved pinky fingers). Intellectual disability has been observed in all cases old enough to test and is in the mild to moderate range. (Note: While some writers suggest intellectual disability is moderate to severe, this has not been recorded in any descriptions of the disorder.) Though other Y-chromosome polysomy disorders are associated with tall stature, this does not appear to be true in XYYYY syndrome, with recorded heights ranging from the 10th to 97th percentile. Autism and attention-deficit hyperactivity disorder are both thought to be associated with the syndrome. External genitalia are normal, but testicular insufficiency appears to develop during childhood and lead to adult azoospermia.

== History ==
Non-mosaic XYYYY syndrome was first recorded in 1981 in a 14-month-old boy, though a mosaic case with mixed 49,XYYYY and 45,X0 cells had been recorded in 1968. This case was followed up at the age of seven, providing the only known long-term follow-up of the disorder. Only two adults with XYYYY syndrome have been described.

== Prevalence ==
The disorder's prevalence is estimated to be below 1 in 1,000,000.

== See also ==
- XYY syndrome
- XYYY syndrome
