= Rosemary Ferguson Dybwad =

Rosemary Ferguson Dybwad (May 12, 1910 — November 3, 1992) was an American developmental disability advocate between the 1950s to 1990s. Dybwad had previously worked as a case worker and at correctional facilities before she joined the National Association for Retarded Children in 1957. With the National Association, Dybwad was the secretary of international correspondence for her husband, Gunnar Dybwad, between 1957 and 1963. From 1964 to 1967, Dybwad and her husband co-directed a project on intellectual disabilities for the International Union of Child Welfare. Apart from the work with her husband, Dybwad joined the board of directors for the International League of Societies for Persons with Mental Handicaps in 1966 and remained with the International League in 1978. Dybwad also wrote three editions of the International Directory of Mental Retardation Resources between 1971 and 1989.

== Early life and education ==
On May 12, 1910, Dybwad was born in Howe, Indiana. As a teenager, she grew up in Manila, Philippines. For her post-secondary education, Dybwad began her studies at the Western College for Women before completing a two-year fellowship at the University of Leipzig in 1933. After attending the Indiana University School of Social Work for a year, Dybwad received a Doctor of Philosophy from the University of Hamburg in 1936. She completed her education with her postdoctoral research at the New York School of Social Work in 1938.

== Career ==
While completing her education in the 1930s, Dybwad was a caseworker at a school before working at correctional facilities in Northeastern United States. After leaving her job in 1939, Dybwad raised her children while her husband, Gunnar Dybwad, worked in child welfare. Upon her husband's appointment as director of the National Association for Retarded Children in 1957, Dybwad became the association's secretary of international correspondence that year and held the position until 1963. Between 1964 and 1967, Dybwad worked at the International Union of Child Welfare and co-directed a project on intellectual disabilities with her husband.

During this time period, Dybwad joined the board of directors for the International League of Societies for Persons with Mental Handicaps in 1966. She additionally served as a vice president and remained with the International League until 1978. Outside of the work with her husband, Dybwad released the International Directory of Mental Retardation Resources in 1971. After Dybwad published edited versions of the International Directory in 1979 and 1989, she wrote Perspectives on a Parent Movement: The Revolt of Parents of Children with Intellectual Limitations in 1990.

== Personal life ==
On November 3, 1992, Dybwad died from cancer in Wellesley, Massachusetts. She was married and had two children.
