= Rosa's Law =

2010 United States law

- Long title: An Act to change references in Federal law to mental retardation to references to an intellectual disability, and change references to a mentally retarded individual to references to an individual with an intellectual disability.
- Enacted by: the 111th United States Congress
- Effective: October 5, 2010

Citations
- Public law: Pub. L. 111–256 (text) (PDF)
- Statutes at Large: 124 Stat. 2643-2645

Codification
- Acts amended: Various

Legislative history
- Introduced in the Senate by Barbara Mikulski (D–MD) on 2009; Committee consideration by Committee on Health, Education, Labor, and Pensions; Passed the Senate on August 5, 2010; Passed the House on September 22, 2010; Signed into law by President Barack Obama on October 5, 2010

Rosa's Law is a United States law which replaced instances of "mental retardation" in law with "intellectual disability". The bill was introduced as S.2781 in the United States Senate on November 17, 2009, by Barbara Mikulski (D-MD). It passed the Senate unanimously on August 5, 2010, then the House of Representatives on September 22, and was signed into law by President Barack Obama on October 5. The law is named after Rosa Marcellino, a girl with Down syndrome who was nine years old when it became law, and who, according to Barack Obama, "worked with her parents and her siblings to have the words 'mentally retarded' officially removed from the health and education code in her home state of Maryland."

According to the report submitted to the Senate by the Committee on Health, Education, Labor, and Pensions, "The committee believes that the terms "mentally retarded," "mental retardation," and variations of these terms, to describe individuals with intellectual disabilities are anachronistic, needlessly insensitive and stigmatizing, and clinically outdated."

== See also ==
- Developmental disability
- Feeble-minded
- Intermediate Care Facilities for Individuals with Intellectual Disabilities
- Qualified Intellectual Disability Professional
