= Mabley Developmental Center =

Hospital in Illinois, United States

Coordinates: 41.876123°N 89.478336°W

The Mabley Developmental Center is a state institution for people with developmental disabilities located in Dixon, Illinois. It is named for Jack Mabley, a Chicago columnist, in recognition of his unstinting support for the project.

In 1899, the Illinois General Assembly authorized the creation of the Illinois State Colony for Epileptics under the Board of State Commissioners of Public Charities. However, no funds for construction and operation were appropriated until 1913.

In 1909, the Board of Administration replaced the Board of State Commissioners of Public Charities. The Board selected a site north of Dixon and the colony opened on May 1, 1918.

In 1917, the Department of Public Welfare assumed responsibility for the colony and retained control until the creation of the Department of Mental Health in 1961 (L. 1961, p. 2666), which was called the Dixon State School at the time. In 1921, the duties of the institution expanded to include care for the developmentally delayed, and 158 clients were transferred from the Lincoln State School to alleviate overcrowding there. To reflect this change, the colony was renamed Dixon State Hospital and later Dixon State School. In 1927, the state opened a school for practical nursing at the institution. In 1975, the General Assembly changed its name to the Dixon Developmental Center.

In the 1950s, journalist Jack Mabley ran a series of columns exposing the conditions at Dixon State School. His reporting was part of the reason why the hospital was closed. In 1983, the grounds were repurposed for a state prison, Dixon Correctional Center. In 1987, Mabley Developmental Center, named after Jack Mabley, was opened.

== Today ==
The Mabley Developmental Center focuses exclusively on the developmentally disabled. At the end of fiscal year 2009, Mabley had 136.4 employees and an annual appropriation of $10,584,400.
