= Wayne County Training School =

Coordinates: 42°24′07″N 83°28′42″W

Wayne County Training School, alternately known as the Wayne County Training School for Feeble Minded Children or the Wayne County Child Development Center, was a state-funded institution for people with developmental disabilities, located in Northville Township, Michigan. Construction of the institution began in 1923, and it opened in 1926. Expansion on the property continued until 1930. The school closed its doors on October 18, 1974. Most of the buildings were left abandoned until 1998, when the land was sold and the abandoned institution was demolished.

== History ==
The Michigan State Training School was found inadequate to provide care for the entire state and the process was started to build the school in 1919. The Board of Superiors appointed committees in 1919 and 1920 to make establishing another institution possible. After investigation, the committees concluded that two more individuals were in need of care than once thought. Out of 568 children recommended for institutional commitment, only 111 could be accommodated at the Michigan State Training School in Lapeer. Hundreds more were found to be at large due to the lack of proper accommodations.

After complaining to other institutions in the nation, the Board of Superiors recommended that a bond issue of $1,000,000 be authorized to construct the school. In November 1922, voters approved the construction of the training institution almost two votes to one. William H. Maybury, who previously invested in numerous projects in the surrounding community, actively supported and funded the school's construction. It is estimated that his gifts for the Training School totaled $2 million. On February 14, 1923, 905 acres were purchased in Northville Township, and another 105 acres were purchased shortly after.

Upon completion, the Wayne County Training School could accommodate 800 children. The buildings built on the property included 16 dormitories, school, building, an assembly hall, hospital, an administration building, and several auxiliary buildings. The institution's name was changed to the Wayne County Child Development Center July 1, 1966.

=== Eugenics ===
On May 23, 1923, Michigan Governor Fred Green signed the state's sterilization bill. This made sterilization for anyone deemed feeble minded mandatory with court order. The school was used to enforce the state's eugenics law, though fewer forced sterilizations took place in Wayne County. At the Lapeer Home and Training School, a total of 216 males and 688 females underwent sterililization surgery by 1934. From 1930 to 1934, 14 boys and 47 girls institutionalized at the Wayne County Training School were ‘rendered incapable of passing on their defects to a new generation’.

=== Plymouth State Home and Training School ===
On October 18, 1956, plans to build an additional facility on the Wayne County School's property were revealed. Able to accommodate 2,500 patients, the Plymouth State Home and Training School covered 250 acres of land which would have originally been turned over to the state. In 1972, the name was changed to Plymouth Center for Human Development.

== Closing ==
At the time of its closing, the school consisted of 35 buildings. It is estimated that the total cost of the school was around $3 million. In 1977, Governor William G. Milliken asked to use the school's buildings as state prisons. Aside from the Wayne County school, the St. Augustine's Seminary in Saugatuck, the J.L. Hudson Co. warehouse in Detroit, and the Kincheloe Air Force Base in Sault Ste. Marie were proposed to be converted into correctional facilities as well. The Wayne County Training School could have held 500 inmates, though renovations and furnishings would have cost up to 2 million alone. Efforts to convert the abandoned buildings to a prison failed.

For a brief period after the institution was shut down, a few buildings were used by Northville Township for offices as well as a police station. One building, known as Cottage 12, was seasonally used by the Northville/Plymouth company Jaycees during the 1980s as a haunted house. Adjacent grounds were used as fields for Northville youth soccer programs until their sale to developers in 1998.
