= Arc of the United States =

American disability organization

The Arc of the United States
- Formation: 1950
- Founders: Parent advocacy groups
- Type: 501(c)(3) organization
- Purpose: Disability rights, services, and advocacy
- Headquarters: 2000 Pennsylvania Avenue NW, Suite 500, Washington, DC 20006
- Region served: United States
- Members: 549 chapters (as of 2025)
- Key people: Katherine (Katy) Neas (CEO)
- Website: thearc.org

The Arc of the United States is an organization serving people with intellectual and developmental disabilities. The organization was founded in the 1950s by parents of people with developmental disabilities. The Arc of the United States is based in Washington, D.C. and, as of 2025, operates chapters in 549 cities, as well as all states except Maine.

== Programs and activities ==
The Arc of the United States primarily conducts advocacy and public awareness work focused on Medicaid, special education, Social Security, and health care policy; it also organizes grassroots advocacy within the same fields. The organization also advocates against stigma and discrimination against disabled people. This includes awareness campaigns to combat ableist slurs and to advocate for better employment for people with disabilities.

Its special education initiative, Arc@School, provides plain-language training and resources about the Individuals with Disabilities Education Act (IDEA), a federal law ensuring children with disabilities receive a free appropriate public education.

The National Center on Criminal Justice and Disability (NCCJD) is a program of The Arc of the United States established in 2013 with support from the U.S. Bureau of Justice Assistance. It serves to provide training and resources for justice professionals. They also provide resources to people with disabilities who are actively interacting with the criminal justice system. This can include victims, witnesses, suspects, defendants, and detainees

The organization hosts a National Convention that hosts people with intellectual and developmental disabilities (IDD), family members, professionals, and advocates to discuss current issues; historical speakers have included John F. Kennedy, who addressed the National Convention in 1963.

The Arc oversees Wings for Autism/Wings for All, an annual airport “rehearsal” program run with airlines, airports, and security partners to help travelers with autism and other IDDs prepare for air travel.

According to financial statements submitted to the IRS, the organization's 2019 income was $9.8 million. Its end of year assets were reported to be $13.4 million. Major sources of income are charitable donations; dues for membership in local and state chapters; and government grants, contracts, and fees.

== History ==
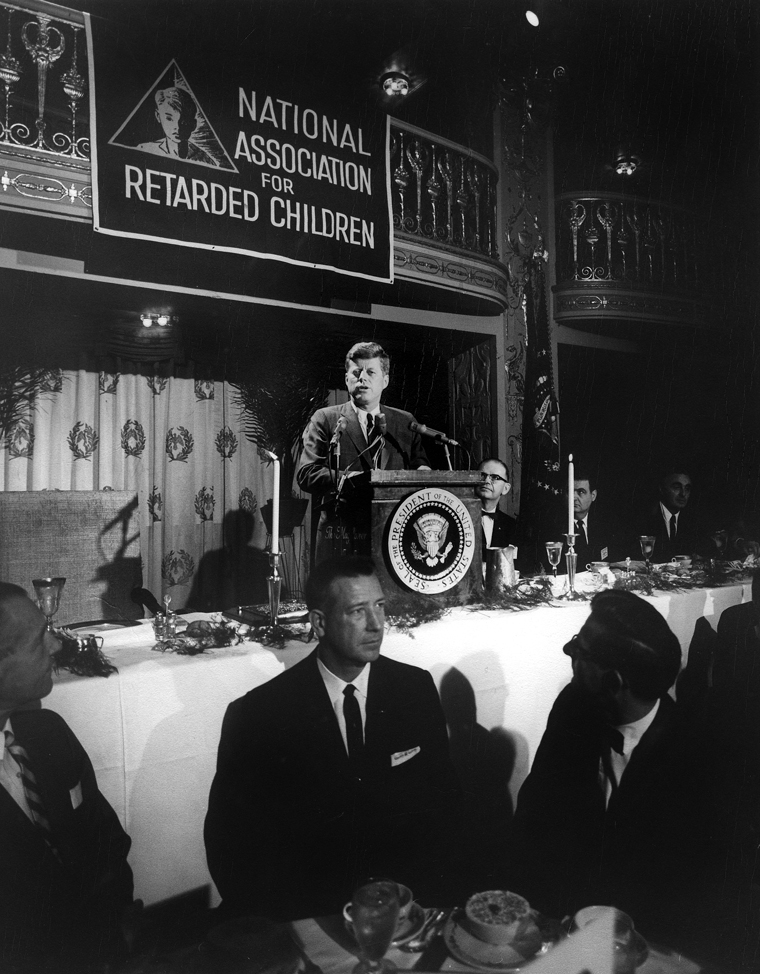
President John F. Kennedy addressing NARC in 1963.

The earliest organization that later became a chapter of The Arc was the Children's Benevolent League, incorporated in 1936 in the state of Washington. In 1950, parent groups from across the country met in Minneapolis, MN to formally organize the National Association of Parents and Friends of Retarded Children, with the goal of expanding community services and civil rights for people with IDD. In 1952 its name was shortened to the National Association for Retarded Children (NARC). The NARC opened its Governmental Affairs office in Washington, D.C. in the 1960s to focus on national advocacy.

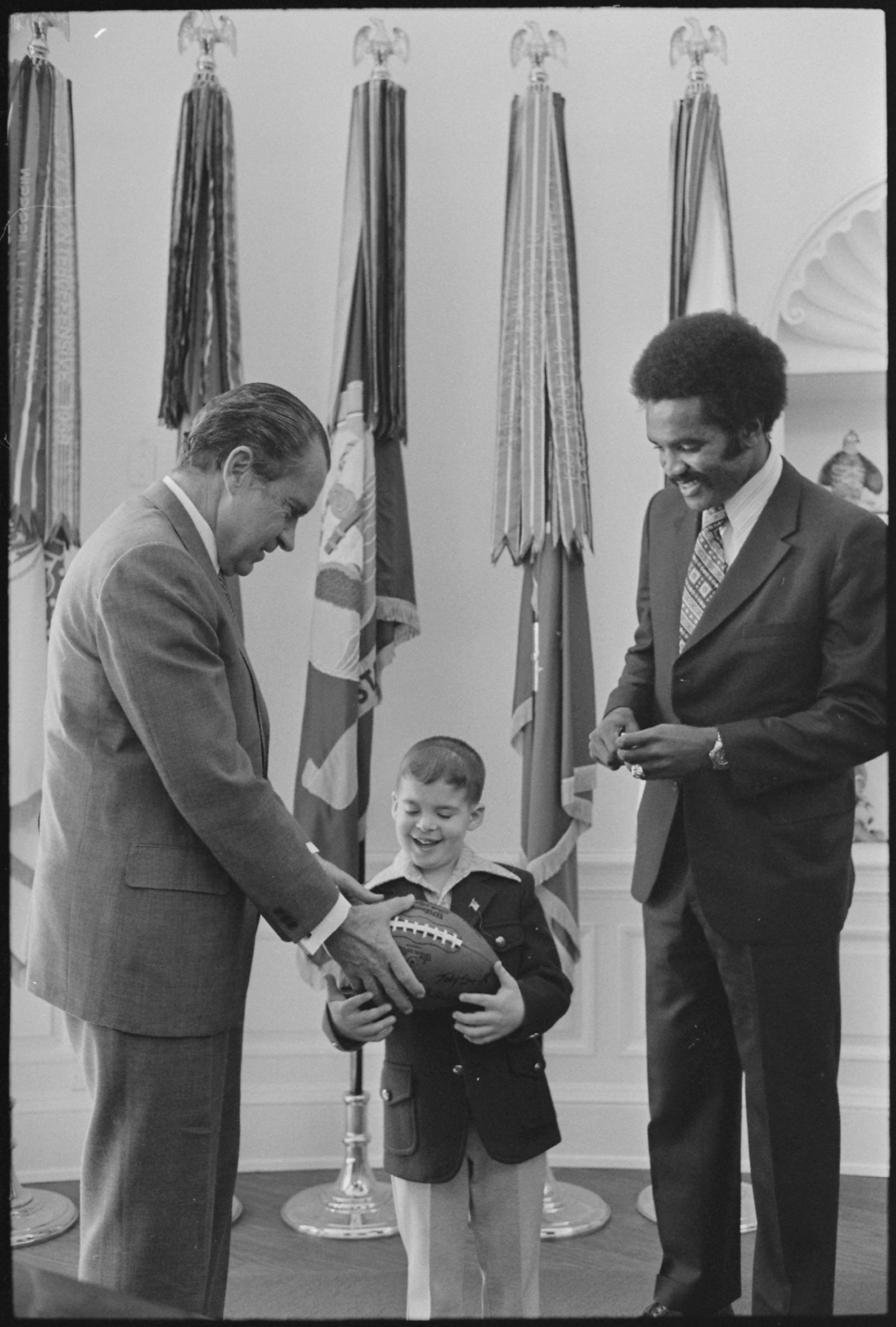
President Richard Nixon meeting with the 1972 poster child of the NARC.

From 1973 to 1981, the organization was called the National Association for Retarded Citizens. From 1981 to 1992, it was named the Association for Retarded Citizens of the United States. The Arc assumed its present name in 1992, in recognition of the pejorative nature of the word "retarded".

The Arc and its chapters participated in national coalitions that supported major disability-related laws, including the Education for All Handicapped Children Act (now Individuals with Disabilities Education Act, IDEA), the Americans with Disabilities Act (ADA), and later measures such as the Achieving a Better Life Experience (ABLE) Act of 2014 and Rosa's Law. The organization also engaged in historical advocacy on Medicaid and Social Security to expand and protect benefits affecting people with disabilities.
