= Broadview Developmental Center =

Former Psychiatric Hospital

Coordinates: 41°18′21″N 81°40′51″W

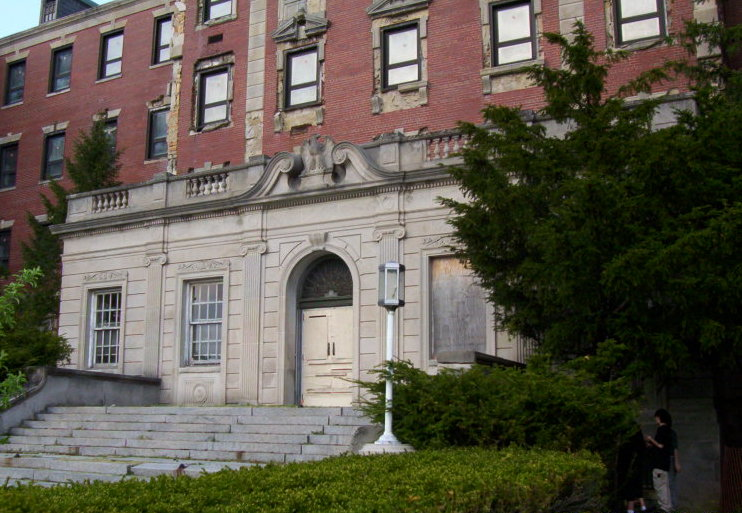
Front view of the Broadview Developmental Center 05/13/2005

The Broadview Developmental Center was a psychiatric hospital built in 1939 near Broadview Heights, Ohio, United States. Constructed under the Works Progress Administration as part of President Franklin Roosevelt's New Deal, it functioned as a Veterans Administration Hospital until 1966 when it was sold to the state of Ohio. The Broadview Developmental Center was then converted into a psychiatric hospital, and remained open until 1993 when the prevailing opinion on mental health shifted from institutional care to community-based care, and the hospital lost its funding. The building was demolished in 2006, except for its newest portion, which was kept as the city of Broadview Heights' city hall and recreation centre.

== Broadview Veterans Administration Hospital ==
The hospital originally opened in 1939, under the control of the United States Veterans Administration. While it performed traditional functions by caring for the numerous veterans of World War II, it also served as housing for victims of tuberculosis. Because the disease was highly contagious, most infected persons were separated from the general public. They were often entered into sanitaria such as Broadview, where they could be cared for without threat to the at-large population.

Designed to be self-sufficient, the campus included a full cafeteria and kitchen, dental offices, a beauty shop, and a chapel. It also included small cottages on the property, where patients who required less supervision were housed. Separate wards were built for children and maternity patients. This minimized contact between patients and the outside world, thus reducing risk of infection. Most of the staff had offices on campus.

With the discovery of Streptomycin in 1946, the usefulness of these facilities began to wane. The antibiotic proved a potent treatment for tuberculosis, significantly reducing the risk of widespread contagion. This limited Broadview Hospital's use to the federal government, which sold the facility to the state of Ohio in 1966.

== Broadview Developmental Center ==
The state government promptly converted the hospital into a institution for people with developmental disabilities. There were multiple court cases that found allegations of abuse, including Collyer v. Broadview Developmental Center and Nicoletti v. Brown. A DOJ investigation into the conditions at Broadview Developmental Center, as well as Cleveland and Warrensville, found numerous issues, including overuse of physical and chemical restraints, lack of legally required training programs, and deficiencies in medical care. This likely contributed to the hospital losing its ICF/MR certification. The administration applied for a four-year extension which was granted. Broadview Developmental Center, the most recent closure, could not maintain ICF/MR certification. Legislation was introduced in 1989 to keep the center open for four years till 1993 to obtain Medicaid certification.[www.equipforequality.org/publications/cipp_final.doc]

The center closed, and the residents were transferred to other developmental centers or to community-based programs in 1993.

== Abandonment/Deinstitutionalization ==
The building was abandoned almost immediately. Large amounts of medical and office equipment were left within, personal artifacts belonging to former staff and patients, and numerous filing cabinets filled with patient records. The abandonment caused a large amount of controversy, as the majority of former patients had been released to community-based organizations (most residents did not have any family what so ever), and all records of their treatment, progress, and illness have been lost in the subsequent clean-up and renovation.

Broadview became a popular target for vandalism, and also attracted paranormal investigators as rumors began to surface that the facility was haunted by former patients. Its windows were boarded and the city erected a chain-link fence to keep out would-be explorers. General Assembly voted to sell Broadview Center to the City of Broadview Heights. In the Broadview closure, the local County Board of MR/DD, Cuyahoga County, developed the community alternatives, and community outcomes were improved. In the Broadview closure, parents were active stakeholders in a state-sponsored Oversight Committee, and they helped to establish the criteria for what was needed to support their son or daughter in the community.

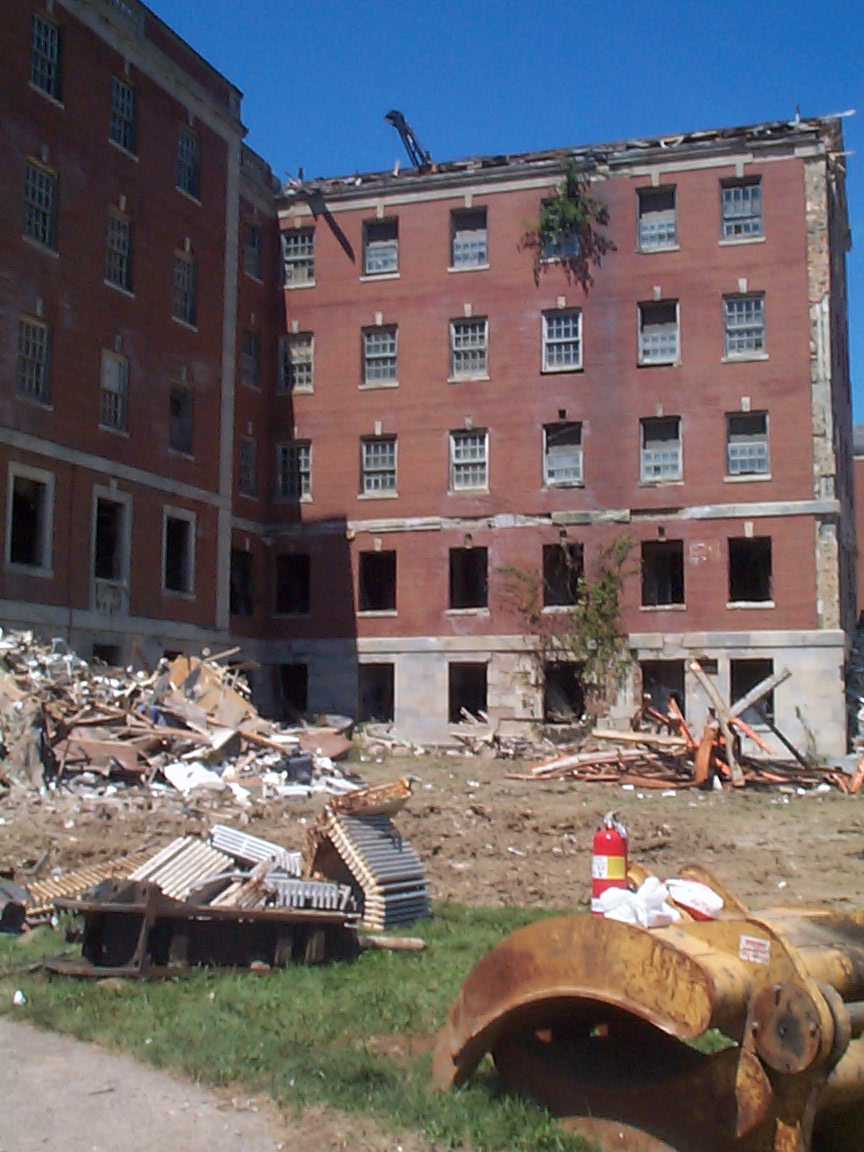
Early 2006 demolition

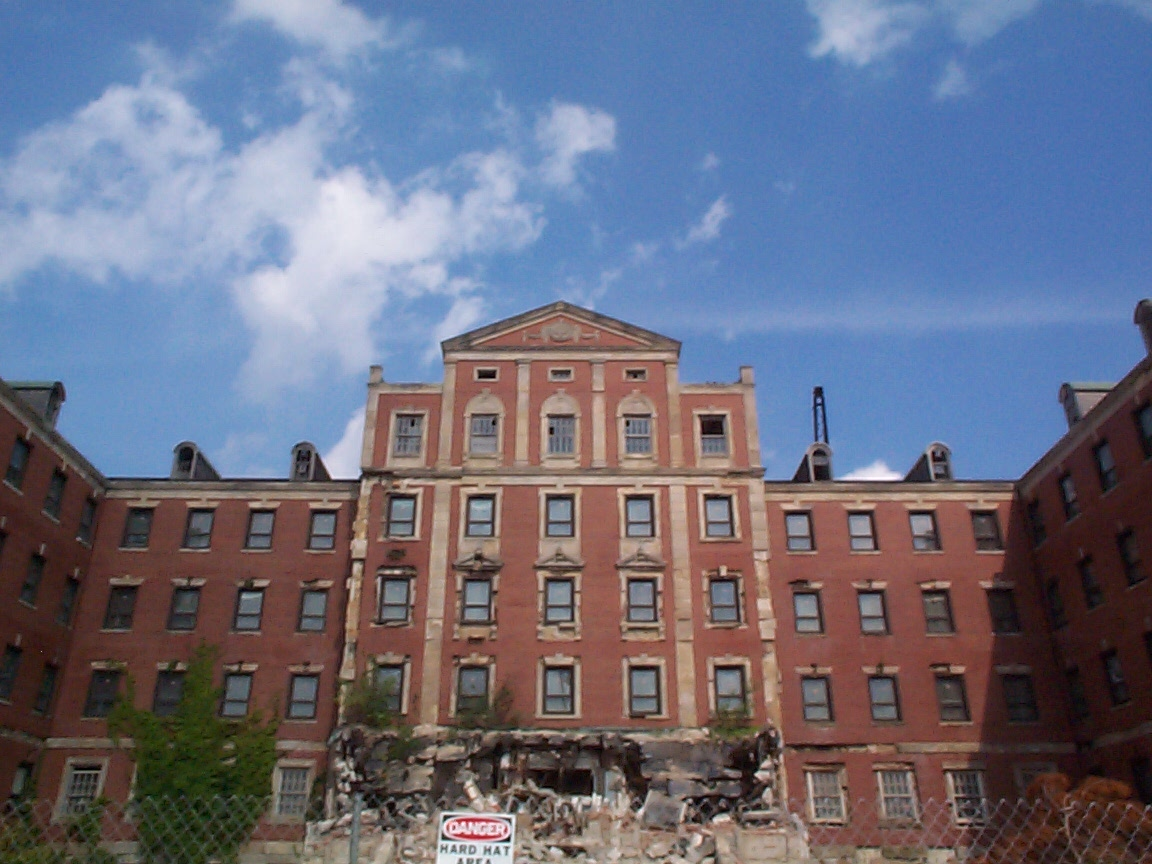
Early 2006 demolition

It remained in this condition until 1995, when the general Assembly voted to sell Broadview Center to the City of Broadview Heights. The city of Broadview Heights purchased the Developmental Center from the state of Ohio for $750,000. The city tore down many of the outlying structures including the cottages, and built a new police station on the grounds. The building was partially renovated and transformed into a community center with an indoor swimming pool and recreational facilities. During the renovation, city inspectors discovered a significant asbestos threat, forcing a temporary delay in construction while the hazardous substance was removed.

== Transition and Community Living ==
The transition plans for residents of Broadview were highly individualized. The resident and his or her family/guardian were involved in the service plan development. The Cuyahoga County Board worked in conjunction with the staff at the institution. A resident or family member/guardian could refuse a prospective placement and request another one or have the option of transferring to another institution. After establishing the criteria for what was required to meet client needs, Broadview asked for a Request for Proposals from the community to develop services to meet specific needs. It took almost two years to move all residents to the community. A majority of the residents went to new eight-bed Intermediate Care Facilities (ICF/IID) that were created at that time. Another large number of residents went to congregate living dwellings, operated by community vendors, with six or fewer beds. Four areas identified as being the hardest services or needs to fill in the community are:

1. transportation – in addition, the providers complain that they don't receive adequate reimbursement for this service;
2. dental;
3. maintaining quality direct support staff; and
4. insufficient quantity of some specialty support staff, such as physical and occupational therapists.

== Demolition ==
After the building was cleared of asbestos, further city construction projects were approved for the community grounds. The grounds adjacent to the Broadview Developmental Center, which is home to Broadview Heights' city hall (since 1999) is maintained. The Broadview Developmental Center was scheduled for demolition in early 2001, but financial troubles in the city government forced delays. A no-interest government loan was secured in 2003 and the demolition process began in early 2006. The city plans to expand the recreation center, and develop the campus into a center for municipal government.
