= Intermediate Care Facilities for Individuals with Intellectual Disabilities =

Disability support service in the United States

Intermediate Care Facilities for Individuals with Intellectual Disabilities (ICF/IID), formerly known as Intermediate Care Facilities for Mental Retardation (ICF/MR), is an American Medicaid-funded institutional long-term services and supports (LTSS) for people with intellectual disabilities or related conditions. Section 1905(d) of the Social Security Act enacted benefits and made funding available for "institutions" (which consisted of 4 or more beds) for individuals with intellectual or related conditions. According to federal law 42 CFR § 440.150 the purpose of ICD/IIDs is to "furnish health or rehabilitative services to persons with Intellectual Disability or persons with related conditions."

The number of individuals living in ICD/IID facilities peaked in 1993 at 147,729 people. In 1981, Congress enacted legislation allowing Medicaid funding for LTSS through programs such as the Home-and Community-Based Services (HCBS) waiver program that provides supports for people to live in their communities and that promotes increased opportunities for choice and control (42 U.S.C. Ch. 7, § 1396n §§.) States have refocused their efforts on providing community-based LTSS leading to a reduction in the use of ICD/IID LTSS. Add As of FY 2107, 74,614 individuals resided in these facilities.

== Background ==
The ICF/MR Program began in 1971 when legislation began federal funding for ICFs/MR as an optional, beneficial Medicaid service. Authorization for ICF/MR services were seen at the congressional level as an option under the state plan Medicaid services. This allowed states to receive matching federal funds for these institutional services. This program helped facilitate the act of deinstitutionalization in which many developmental center institutions (such as Broadview Developmental Center) closed doors and their funding then shifted to community-based programs for individuals with intellectual and developmental disabilities. It provided the first Medicaid long-term services and supports benefit specifically for persons with intellectual and developmental disabilities.

In 2010, Rosa's Law replaced "mental retardation" in law with "intellectual disability", renaming Intermediate Care Facilities for Mental Retardation (ICF/MR) to Intermediate Care Facilities for Individuals with Intellectual Disabilities (ICF/IID).

As of 2011, all 50 states within the U.S.A have at least one ICF/IID-based program. Across the U.S., there are more than 7,000 ICFs/IID. Within these programs there are about 129,000 people with intellectual disabilities and other related conditions receiving treatment. Most have other disabilities as well as intellectual disabilities. While many of these individuals located in these facilities are non-ambulatory, have seizure disorders, behavior problems, mental illness, visual or hearing impairments, or a combination of the above, they all still must qualify for Medicaid assistance financially to remain in practice.

In order to obtain Medicaid reimbursement, ICFs/IID must be certified and comply with state mandated standards of practice in eight areas, including management, client protections, facility staffing, active treatment services, client behavior and facility practices, health care services, physical environment and dietetic services. Upon successful auditing and submission of these eight areas, will then a service providing for individuals be ICF/IID certified.

The Centers for Medicare and Medicaid Services has issued regulations regarding seclusion and restraint. These regulations are called "Conditions of Participation (CoPs)." CoPs serve as the basis of survey activities for the purpose of determining whether a facility qualifies for a provider agreement under Medicare or Medicaid. There is a set of CoPs for each type of provider or supplier subject to certification. Providers must meet the applicable CoPs for them to be able to provide and continue to provide Medicare and Medicaid benefits.

== Individual development ==
Operating ICFs/IID certified companies and organizations must recognize the developmental, cognitive, social, physical, and behavioral needs of individuals with intellectual disabilities who live in their setting or environment by requiring that each individual receives active treatment in regards to appropriate habilitation of their functions to be eligible for Medicaid funding. Current ICFs/IID certified companies must submit to protocol and auditing procedures to ensure they receive said active treatment in order to obtain Medicaid funding through the subsequent state of audit.

Active treatment can be defined as the individualized implementation of a program of training, treatment, health, and related services directed toward the rehabilitation of the behaviors necessary for the individual to function within the general scope of their being and independence as well as possible. This treatment can and should include prevention or deceleration (or regression) of current functional statuses. This can be facilitated through the development of goals, outings, and a behavioral support plan or Individual Service Plan established by their Qualified Intellectual Disability Professional.

== Medicaid Home and Community Based Services ==
The Medicaid Home and Community Based Services (HCBS) was authorized in 1981 as an alternative to the institutional standards of the ICF/IID program. This service complemented ICF/IID by helping with the financial shift from institutions to community-based service.

Medicaid, the nation's primary health insurance program for persons with disabilities and low-income populations is provided for most people with significant disabilities who have greater medical needs and often require assistance with the activities of daily living throughout their lifetimes. It is overwhelmingly the largest funding source of both acute health care and long term services and supports for most of our constituents. Although Medicaid is a federal program, its benefits are defined and distributed at the state level.
