= Gunnar Dybwad =

- Born: Leipzig, Germany
- Died: September 13, 2001; Needham, Massachusetts
- Education: University of Halle
- Occupations: Professor, Civil Rights Activist
- Notable work: Challenges in Mental Retardation
- Spouse: Rosemary Ferguson Dybwad

Gunnar Dybwad (1909–2001) was an American professor and advocate for the rights of people with disabilities, particularly developmental disabilities. He is best known for his support for the social model of disability, reframing disability accommodations as a matter of civil rights, not medical treatment. The American Association on Intellectual and Developmental Disabilities gives out the Dybwad Humanitarian Award annually in his honor.

== Personal life ==
Dybwad was born in Leipzig, Germany, and lived in Germany until 1934. He moved to the United Kingdom, then to the United States where he settled in Wellesley, Massachusetts with his wife, Rosemary, and their two children.

Being interested in architectural planning and disabilities, Dybwad remodeled his home to be wheelchair accessible at the age of 82. He and his wife wished to die at home and it was done as an "anti-nursing home" strategy. He converted the downstairs of his two-story home to function as a "self-contained unit" should they find it difficult to maneuver the stairs.

Dybwad died (age 92) of natural causes at the Wingate Rehabilitation Center in Needham, Massachusetts.

== Education ==
Dybwad studied law and political science at University of Halle in Germany, where he earned a Doctorate in Law in 1934. Dybwad graduated from the New York School of Social Work in 1939.

== Career ==
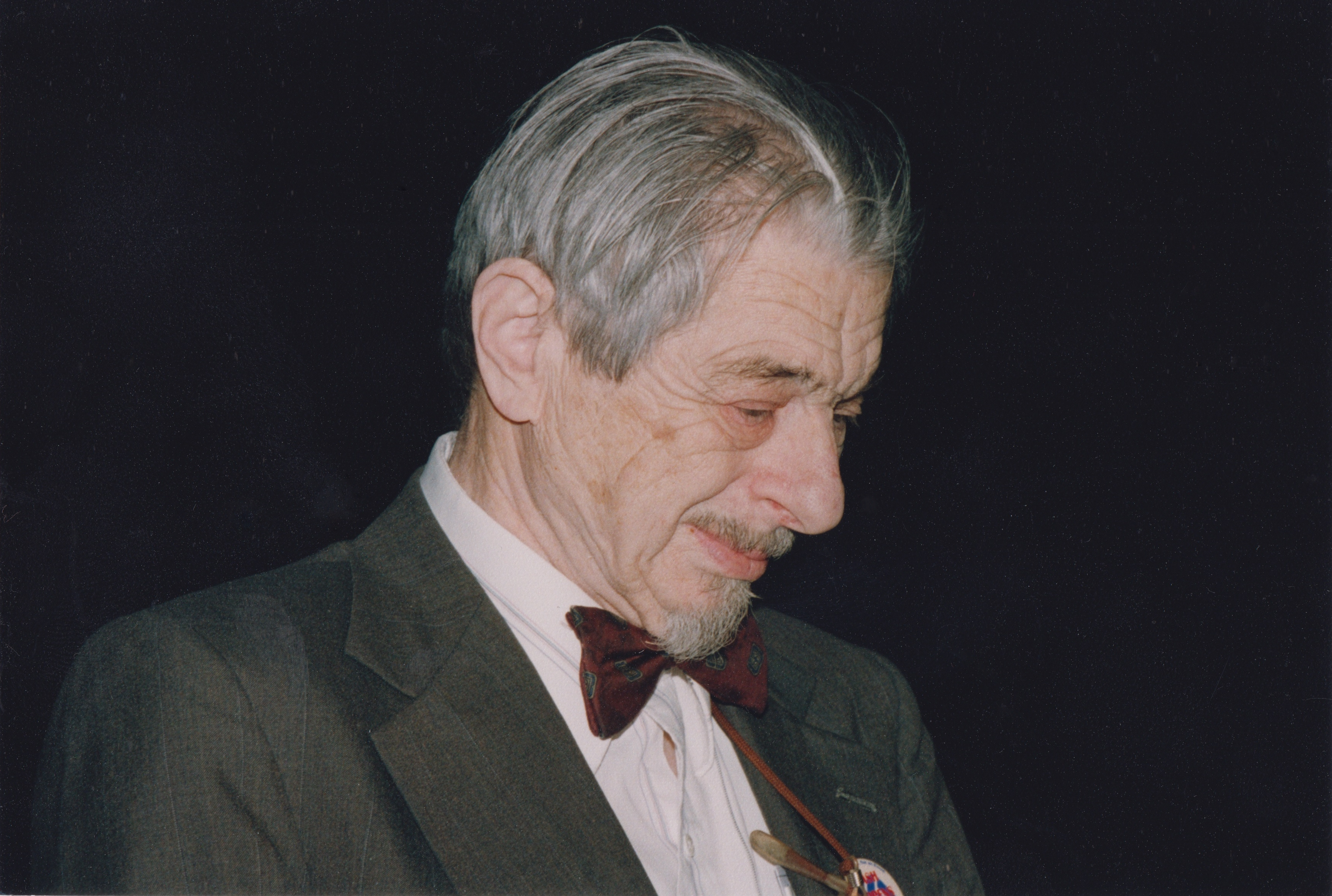
Gunnar Dybwad at the TASH Annual Conference, Boston, Massachusetts, December 1997

At the start of his career, Dybwad focused his attention on the humane treatment for people in the criminal justice and child welfare systems. His book, Theorie und Praxis des fascistischen Strafvollzugs (Theory and Practice of the Fascist Penitentiary), explored the practices and theories of Italy's (Fascist) penal system of the early 1930s.

He also served as director of several organizations: Child Welfare Program, Michigan (Director, 1943–1951), National Association for Retarded Children (executive director, 1957–1963), Child Study Association of America (executive director, 1951–1957)

Gunnar Dybwad is well known for his international leadership in the field of rehabilitation and medicine, advocating for disability rights and for ethical and legal protections.

From 1964 to 1967, Dybwad and his wife directed the "mental retardation project" of the International Union of Child Welfare, Geneva, Switzerland.

In 1967, Dybwad became the founding director of the Starr Center for Mental Retardation at the Heller School for Policy and Management, Brandeis University.

In 1973, Dybwad was a founding member of the American Bar Association's (ABA) commission on the Mentally Disabled. Other members included Chesterfield Smith, Jerome J. Shestack, David L. Bazelon, Charles R. Halpern, Jonas Robitcher, Saleem A. Shah, McNeill Smith, Helen Wright, and Alan A. Stone.

He served as president of Inclusion International from 1978 to 1982. The organization, which he and his wife co-founded, assisted parent and self-advocacy groups. He is known for is support of families of children with disabilities and with the development of young professionals in the fields.

Dybwad retired from Brandeis in 1974 due to mandatory age limitations. After leaving Brandeis, Dybwad taught a course on developmental disabilities at Syracuse University and was a lifetime Associate of the Center on Human Policy, Syracuse University.

In 1988 Dybwad appeared on an episode of This Old House showcasing the modifications he had made to his house to make it wheelchair accessible.

=== Normalization and Integration ===
Dybwad believed that people with developmental and intellectual disabilities best responded to integration into the community. Maximal integration meant providing these people with opportunities to live in "ordinary family settings," and have access to "typical community services." Although, he was against "custodial care", he understood the need for a range of programs and residential facilities to meet the requirements of a broad array individuals. At the 1959 Convention of the National Association for Retarded Children, he called for "research in problems of management, of residential care, including physical plant and equipment."

In 1979, he co-authored an article called "Unnecessary Coercion: An End to Involuntary Civil Commitment of Retarded Persons" in which he argued for the abolition of the often forced and involuntary placement of people with intellectual disabilities into state facilities.

"Professor Dybwad was one of the first to articulate the issues facing people with disabilities as civil rights issues and not only as medical and social issues. He was a champion of the rights of people with disabilities to have full access to a normal life that everyone wants to enjoy"

— Marty Krauss, director of the Starr Center"

=== Citizen Advocacy ===
Dybwad supported volunteer groups and citizen advocacy, whose purpose was to "demand and obtain" services for people with disabilities. He brought an international perspective to the issue. In the 1950s, Dybwad, representing the Association of Retarded Citizens (known as The Arc), helped to organize family members and friends in efforts to "liberate people" from custodial institutions. He played a major role in encouraging the 1972 Pennsylvania Association for Retarded Children (PARC) to file disability rights litigation with the federal court. Among the top concerns of the group was the right of people with disabilities to receive public education. This action, along with others—including Pennhurst State School vs. Halderman (1981) and Board of Education vs. Rowley (1982) resulted in "groundbreaking" changes to due process and equal protection for the treatment and education of people with disabilities."

== Awards ==
The American Association on Intellectual and Developmental Disabilities gives out the Dybwad Humanitarian Award, named after him, to individuals involved with "culturally responsive programs that have succeeded in full community inclusion and participation".

Dybwad, himself, received the following:

- Kennedy Foundation International Award (1986)
- The Adaptive Environments Center Lifetime Achievement Award in Universal Design (First Recipient, 1994)
- Honorary Doctorate, Temple University
- Honorary Doctorate, University of Maryland
- National Historical Trust on Mental Retardation Honoree

== Selected articles ==
- Parent Education: Courage. And the Parent Educator. (with Marion L. Faegre)
- Reviewed Work(s): Personality in the Making—The Fact-Finding Report of the Mid-century White House Conference on Children and Youth by Helen Leland Witner and Ruth Kotinsky
- Unnecessary Coercion: An End to Involuntary Civil Commitment of Retarded Persons.

== Books ==
- "Action Implications, USA Today", chapter in Changing Patterns, editors Kugel and Wolfensberer (1969)
- Challenges in Mental Retardation (Columbia University Press, 1964) ISBN 978-0-231-02702-1
- Responding to the Challenge: Current Issues and International Developments in Developmental Disabilities, with Hank A. Bersani (Brookline, 1999)
