= Sunland Hospital =

Chain of state schools throughout the state of Florida

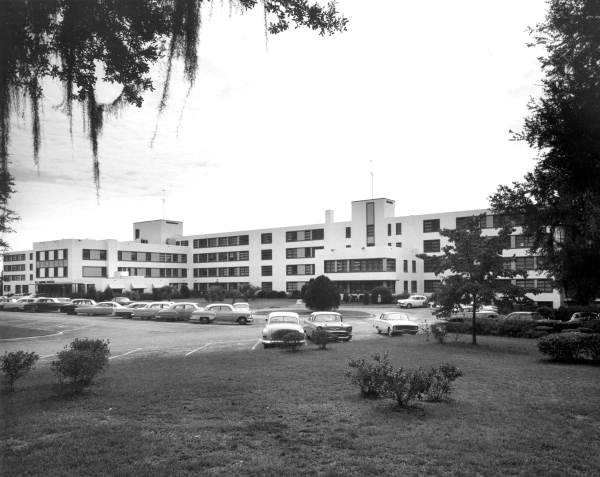
W. T. Edwards Hospital in Tallahassee, FL; 1960

Sunland Hospital refers to a chain of state schools located throughout the state of Florida.

Originally named the W. T. Edwards Tuberculosis Hospitals, the facilities were later remodelled into "Sunland Centers" with services for the mentally and physically disabled, specializing mostly in children. A large majority of the centers were shut down by 1983 for various health and safety reasons.

== W. T. Edwards Tuberculosis Hospital ==
W.T. Edwards came to Florida from Virginia in 1925 with his business partner Alfred I Dupont and was vice president of the St Joe Paper company. He was the first chairman of the State Tuberculosis Board. When a new series of state-of-the-art tuberculosis hospitals opened in roughly 1952, they were named in honour of him. The hospitals were located all over the state of Florida, including Tampa, Lantana, Marianna, Tallahassee, Miami and several other cities in south Florida. He was presented with a portrait which hung in one of the hospitals.

All of the hospital buildings were constructed in the same basic way. The main buildings were all very long and thin, consisting of 5 floors with a few smaller wings branching off from the main building. At the time, it was thought that fresh air was the best treatment for TB, so the buildings were riddled with multi-pane windows which could be opened by cranks. The back side of each building was a wall of windows, while the front windows were more evenly spaced apart, especially in sections that did not house patients.

When antibiotics effective against TB were developed, there was no longer a need for tuberculosis hospitals and the W. T. Edwards Hospitals were all closed by the start of the 1960s. The facilities fell under the jurisdiction of the Florida Department of Health and it wouldn't take long for the hospitals to reopen as Sunlands across the state.

== Sunland Training Centers ==
In 1961 the Division of Sunland Training Centers was established on the Board of Commissioners for Institutions and replaced the Division of Farm Colonies in Florida. Many former W. T. Edwards Hospitals were remodeled and reopened as Sunland Mental Hospitals. The main Sunland building, located in Orlando, was the only one not housed in a former Edwards hospital.

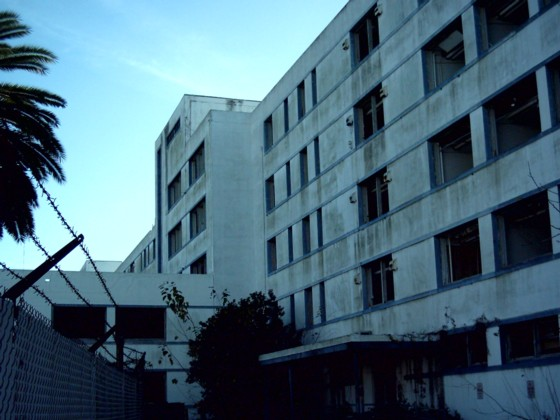
W. T. Edwards Hospital in Tampa, FL; November 2006

At first the Centers did well, but soon they were plagued with problems, mostly due to understaffing and underfunding. The most infamous facility for patient neglect was the Sunland located in Tallahassee, which not only suffered from severe staff shortages, but also significant deterioration of the physical plant itself.

Many Sunlands had various activities for the patients, who were mostly children, to engage in. There were swimming pools with rails and plastic wheelchairs, hopscotch, shuffleboard and frequent appearances by figures like Woodsy Owl and even the state governor himself. Many of the patients were also official Boy Scouts and often held meetings on the hospital grounds with Scoutmasters. Pictures still exist in the Florida archives of children in full uniform posing in their wheelchairs and hospital beds.

As the state of the hospitals declined, they fell under the Florida Department of Children and Families and underwent several name changes. Eventually, groups like the Association for Retarded Citizens stepped in and began speaking out against institutions like Sunland, which often treated its patients as "sub-human", subjecting them to a variety of treatments that were considered cruel.

As the 1970s came to an end, it soon became obvious that Sunland would not survive. Most of the centers closed down by 1980 and dispersed their patients to foster homes.

== Sunland Center at Tallahassee ==
Sunland at Tallahassee as it stood in June 2006

30.46022°N 84.24467°W

The Sunland Center at Tallahassee received its first 10 residents from the Orlando Sunland in March 1967. The Sunland Center at Tallahassee was considered a hospital because it cared for both mentally and physically disabled patients while all other centers cared for mentally disabled patients only.

Within a year of the Center opening, it started to suffer from a shortage of funds and overcrowding conditions. These forces caused a variety of problems to form within the hospital from poor and inadequately prepared food, overcrowding of the cottages, inactivity of the children, unsanitary conditions, inadequacy of dental services, to unacceptable and torturous hygienic practices. Conditions within the hospital continued to worsen causing various psychologists to call for the closing of the center.

Over time, to help cover costs of various vocation and rehab programs within the state, funds were shifted away from the Sunland Centers to other programs. After various scandals, lack of funds, and the move towards community care, the Sunland Center closed in 1983.

The property was almost purchased in 2004 by a Winter Park businessman, but that deal fell through. Over a year later, the property was finally sold for use in a housing and commercial district project, which later became the Victoria Grand Luxury Apartments.

Demolition of the hospital building and all the surrounding buildings and wooded areas started in early 2006 and was completed in November of the same year. Months later, construction began on the Victoria Grand Apartments. Today, there is no sign of Sunland at Tallahassee remaining on Phillips road. However, relics from the old hospital were said to be collected and used to create part of the Sunland Asylum wing at the Terror of Tallahassee (a local haunted attraction).

== A. G. Holley Hospital ==
A. G. Holley State Hospital (AGH) was opened in 1950 as the Southeast Florida Tuberculosis Hospital. It was originally built to serve 500 patients, with living accommodations for the physicians, nurses and administrative staff. It was the second of four state tuberculosis hospitals built in Florida between 1938 and 1952. The other hospitals have since closed. A. G. Holley was the last of the original American sanatoriums that continued to be dedicated to tuberculosis.

With the discovery of drugs to treat tuberculosis patients outside of the hospital setting, the daily census at the hospital by 1971 dropped to less than half of the original 500. By 1976 the beds and staff at A. G. Holley were reduced to serve a maximum of 150 patients. As space became available, other agencies were invited to move onto the complex to utilize the unique environment.

Tuberculosis in the United States and especially in Florida began to increase in the mid '80s. This was due to the emergence of HIV, an increase in homelessness, drug addiction, immigration from areas of high tuberculosis, the spread in institutional settings, and the spread of drug-resistant tuberculosis.

As the incidence of TB declined, so did the number of beds. Although the hospital was licensed for 100 beds, it was only funded for 50. As the rate of tuberculosis continued to decline, the Florida Legislature felt it was no longer cost effective to run the hospital at a deficit of $10 million per year. Similar outcomes are expected by treating patients at home or in local acute care settings. The Florida legislature mandated in the 2012 session that the hospital close its doors by January 1, 2013. The Department of Health accelerated the closure by six months and the hospital closed July 2, 2012.

Demolition of the main building began on November 18, 2014.
