= Lincoln Developmental Center =

Defunct school in Illinois, United States

- Illinois Asylum for Feeble-Minded Children; Lincoln State School
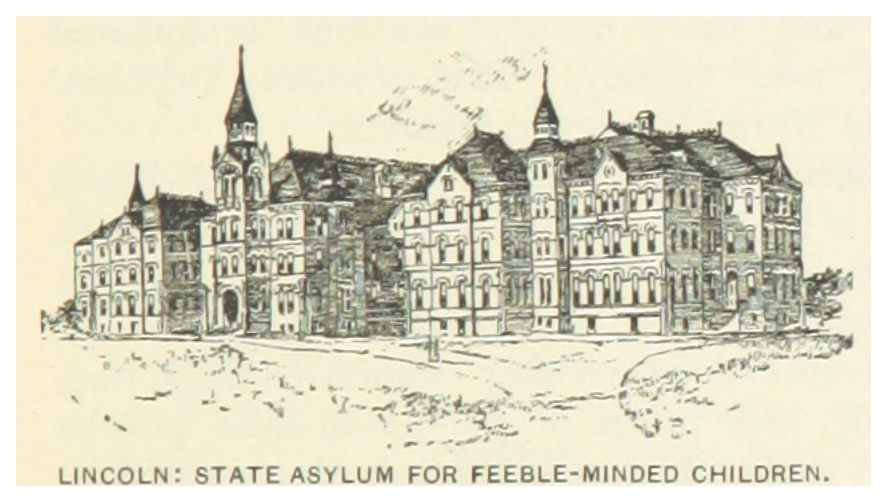
- Illustration, 1891
- Interactive map of Lincoln Developmental Center
- 40°8′26″N 89°22′47″W
- Type: State school
- Location: Lincoln, Illinois

History
- Founded: 1865
- Original use: State school and psychiatric hospital for people with developmental disabilities

Site notes
- Current use: Youth detention center

The Lincoln Developmental Center, historically also known as the Illinois Asylum for Feeble-Minded Children and the Lincoln State School, was a state school and psychiatric hospital for people with developmental disabilities in Lincoln, Illinois. It was founded in 1865 and was notorious for widespread patient abuse. It was closed in 2002 by Illinois governor George Ryan after reports of abuse, neglect, and preventable deaths. The property is now used for a youth detention center.

== History ==
The Lincoln Developmental Center was established in 1865 by board members of the Illinois Institution for the Education of the Deaf and Dumb. It was incorporated as the Illinois Institution for the Education of Feeble-Minded Children in 1871, and plans for a permanent location were started in 1875. The facility opened in 1878.

The facility was understaffed, unsanitary, and overcrowded. Residents that died were often buried on the property and their deaths frequently went uninvestigated. Notable residents included artist and writer Henry Darger as well as John Doe No. 24, an unidentified deaf, mute, and blind man. In 1907, seventeen-year-old resident Frank Giroux suffered severe burns at the asylum due to falling onto a hot radiator while having an epileptic seizure. His severe injury and inadequate treatment caused public scandal, and the Illinois state legislature conducted an investigation into all public residential institutions.

Jack Dykinga took photographs of the facility's conditions for a 1971 Chicago Sun-Times investigation and won the Pulitzer Prize for Feature Photography.

The facility was closed in 2002 by Illinois governor George Ryan after reports of abuse, neglect, and preventable deaths. In 2021, the Illinois Department of Juvenile Justice proposed using the Lincoln Development Center property for a new youth detention center. The new facility, called the Monarch Youth Center, opened in 2025.
