= Arizona State Hospital =

Psychiatric hospital in the United States

Coordinates: 33.4533°N 112.0279°W

Arizona State Hospital is a state-run psychiatric hospital in Phoenix, Arizona. It was opened as the Insane Asylum of Arizona in 1887 and is still open today.

== History ==
=== Territory status ===
In 1871, the territorial legislature acknowledged that caring for the mentally ill was a government responsibility. From 1873 to 1887, the territory contracted with a hospital in Stockton, California, to send Arizona's mentally ill population there.

The 13th Arizona Territorial Legislature, known as the "Thieving Thirteenth", allocated territorial institutions to Arizona cities in 1885. Tucson got the state university, Tempe the normal school, Yuma retained its prison, Prescott remained the capital, and Phoenix received the insane asylum.

The Insane Asylum of Arizona opened in 1887. 61 patients were transferred from the hospital in California.

In 1911, a fire broke out in the central building on campus, known as the D-Building. This caused considerable damage, but all patients and employees were safely evacuated.

=== After statehood ===
Arizona became a state in 1912, and the Territorial Asylum for the Insane was renamed the Arizona State Asylum for the Insane. In 1922, the patient population was 568, then 998 in 1942, and 1,200 in 1945.

In 1939, a social worker was hired exclusively to aid in the discharge of patients.

In 1952, three new buildings were built.

==== Involuntary sterilizations ====
Arizona passed a compulsory sterilization law on March 9, 1929. This was precipitated by the issue of overcrowding at the Arizona State Hospital. Under this bill, the superintendent of the Arizona State Hospital is authorized to make recommendations. The first sterilizations occurred in 1932 when twenty patients were sterilized. 30 individuals total were sterilized, of whom 20 were women 80% of victims were considered mentally ill, and the remaining 20% mentally deficient. The last sterilization took place in 1956.
