= Intellectual disability =

Neurodevelopmental disorder

- Children with intellectual disabilities and other developmental conditions competing in the Special Olympics World Games
- Specialty: Psychiatry, pediatrics
- Symptoms: Problems with reasoning, problem solving, planning, and abstract thinking; general learning difficulties
- Differential diagnosis: Neurocognitive disorders, communication disorders, learning disability, specific learning disorder, autism spectrum disorder
- Frequency: 153 million globally (2015)

Intellectual disability (ID), also known as general learning disability (in the United Kingdom), and formerly as mental retardation, is a generalized neurodevelopmental disorder characterized by significant impairment in intellectual and adaptive functioning. Intellectual disabilities may first be apparent during childhood or be developmentally acquired later in life due to illness or traumatic brain injury. The causes of the disability may be either developmental or genetically inherited. Children with intellectual disability typically have an intelligence quotient (IQ) below 70 and deficits in at least two adaptive behaviors that affect everyday living.

According to the DSM-5, intellectual functions include reasoning, problem solving, planning, abstract thinking, judgment, academic learning, and learning from experience. Deficits in these functions must be confirmed by clinical evaluation and individualized standard IQ testing. On the other hand, adaptive behaviors include the social, developmental, and practical skills people learn to perform tasks in their everyday lives. Deficits in adaptive functioning often compromise an individual's independence and ability to meet their social responsibility. Age related deficits of memory and cognition can cause intellectual disability as seen in Alzheimer's disease and gerontological brain atrophy cases.

Intellectual disability is subdivided into syndromic intellectual disability, in which intellectual deficits associated with other medical and behavioral signs and symptoms are present, and non-syndromic intellectual disability, in which intellectual deficits appear without other abnormalities. Down syndrome and fragile X syndrome are examples of syndromic intellectual disabilities.

Intellectual disability affects about 2–3% of the general population. 75–90% of the affected people have mild intellectual disability. Non-syndromic, or idiopathic cases account for 30–50% of these cases. About a quarter of cases are caused by a genetic disorder, and about 5% of cases are inherited. As of the publication of DSM-5, cases of unknown cause affect about 95 million people as of 2013.

== Signs and symptoms ==
Intellectual disability (ID) becomes apparent during infancy or early childhood, and involves deficits in mental abilities, social skills, and core activities of daily living (ADLs) when compared to peers of the same age. There are often no physical signs of mild forms, although there may be characteristic physical traits when it is associated with a genetic disorder such as Down syndrome.

The level of impairment ranges from mild to severe. Some of the early signs can include:

- Delays in reaching, or failure to achieve milestones in motor skills development (sitting, crawling, walking)
- Slowness learning to talk, or continued difficulties with speech and language skills after starting to talk
- Difficulty with self-help and self-care skills (e.g., getting dressed, washing, and feeding themselves)
- Poor planning or problem-solving abilities
- Behavioral and social problems
- Failure to grow intellectually, or continued infant childlike behavior
- Problems keeping up in school
- Failure to adapt or adjust to new situations
- Difficulty understanding and following social rules

In early childhood, mild ID may not be obvious or identified until beginning school. Even when poor academic performance is recognized, it may take expert assessment to distinguish mild intellectual disability from specific learning disability or emotional/behavioral disorders. People with mild ID are capable of learning reading and mathematics skills to approximately the level of a typical child aged nine to twelve. They can learn self-care and practical skills, such as cooking or using the local transit system. As individuals with intellectual disabilities reach adulthood, many learn to live independently and maintain gainful employment. About 85% of people with ID are likely to have mild ID.

Moderate ID is almost always apparent within the first years of life. Speech delays are particularly common signs of moderate ID. People with moderate intellectual disabilities need considerable support in school, at home, and in the community in order to fully participate. While their academic potential is limited, they can learn simple health and safety skills and to participate in simple activities. As adults, they may live with their parents, in a supportive group home, or even semi-independently with significant supportive services to help them, for example, to manage their finances. As adults, they may work in a sheltered workshop. About 10% of people with ID are likely to have moderate ID.

People with Severe ID, accounting for 3.5% of persons with ID, or Profound ID, accounting for 1.5% of people with ID, need more intensive support and supervision for their entire lives. They may learn some ADLs, but an intellectual disability is considered severe or profound when individuals are unable to independently care for themselves without ongoing significant assistance from a caregiver throughout adulthood. Individuals with profound ID are completely dependent on others for all ADLs and to maintain their physical health and safety. They may be able to learn to participate in some of these activities to a limited degree.

=== Co-morbidity ===
==== Autism and intellectual disability ====
Intellectual disability and autism spectrum disorder (ASD) share clinical characteristics which can result in confusion while diagnosing. Overlapping these two disorders, while common, can be detrimental to a person's well-being. Differentiating between these two disorders will allow clinicians to deliver or prescribe the appropriate treatments, though comorbidity between ID and ASD is very common; roughly 30% of those with ASD also have ID. Both ASD and ID require shortfalls in communication and social awareness as defining criteria.

In a study conducted in 2016 surveying 2816 cases, it was found that the top subsets that help differentiate between those with ID and ASD are, "impaired non-verbal social behavior and lack of social reciprocity, [...] restricted interests, strict adherence to routines, stereotyped and repetitive motor mannerisms, and preoccupation with parts of objects". Those with ASD tend to show more deficits in non-verbal social behavior such as body language and understanding social cues. In a study done in 2008 of 336 individuals with varying levels of ID, it was found that those with ID display fewer instances of repetitive or ritualistic behaviors. It also recognized that those with ASD, when compared to those with ID, were more likely to isolate themselves and make less eye contact. When it comes to classification ID and ASD have very different guidelines. ID has a standardized assessment called the Supports Intensity Scale (SIS); this measures severity on a system built around how much support an individual will need. While ASD also classifies severity by support needed, there is no standard assessment; clinicians are free to diagnose severity at their own judgment.

==== Epilepsy and intellectual disability ====
About 22% of individuals with ID have epilepsy. The incidence of epilepsy is associated with level of ID; epilepsy affects about half of individuals with profound ID. Proper epilepsy management is particularly crucial in this population, as individuals are at increased risk of sudden unexpected death in epilepsy. Nonetheless, epilepsy management in the ID population can be challenging due to high levels of polypharmacy prescribing, drug interactions, and increased vulnerability to adverse effects. It is thought that 70% of individuals with ID are pharmaco-resistant, however only about 10% of individuals are prescribed anti-seizure medications (ASMs) licensed for pharmaco-resistant epilepsy. Research shows that certain ASMs, including levetiracetam and brivaracetam, show similar efficacy and tolerability in individuals with ID as compared to those without. There is much ongoing research into epilepsy management in the ID population.

==== Vision impairment and intellectual disability ====
There are high rates of vision impairment among individuals with intellectual disabilities. The degree of vision impairment seems to be associated with the severity of the disability as well as age. Studies suggest that vision impairment can negatively effect daily living and communication skills in individuals with intellectual disability. Different types of intellectual disability are associated with different forms of vision impairment. Vision impairments and other sensory disorders are often underdiagnosed in populations with intellectual disability due to inadequate screening or assessment challenges.

== Causes ==
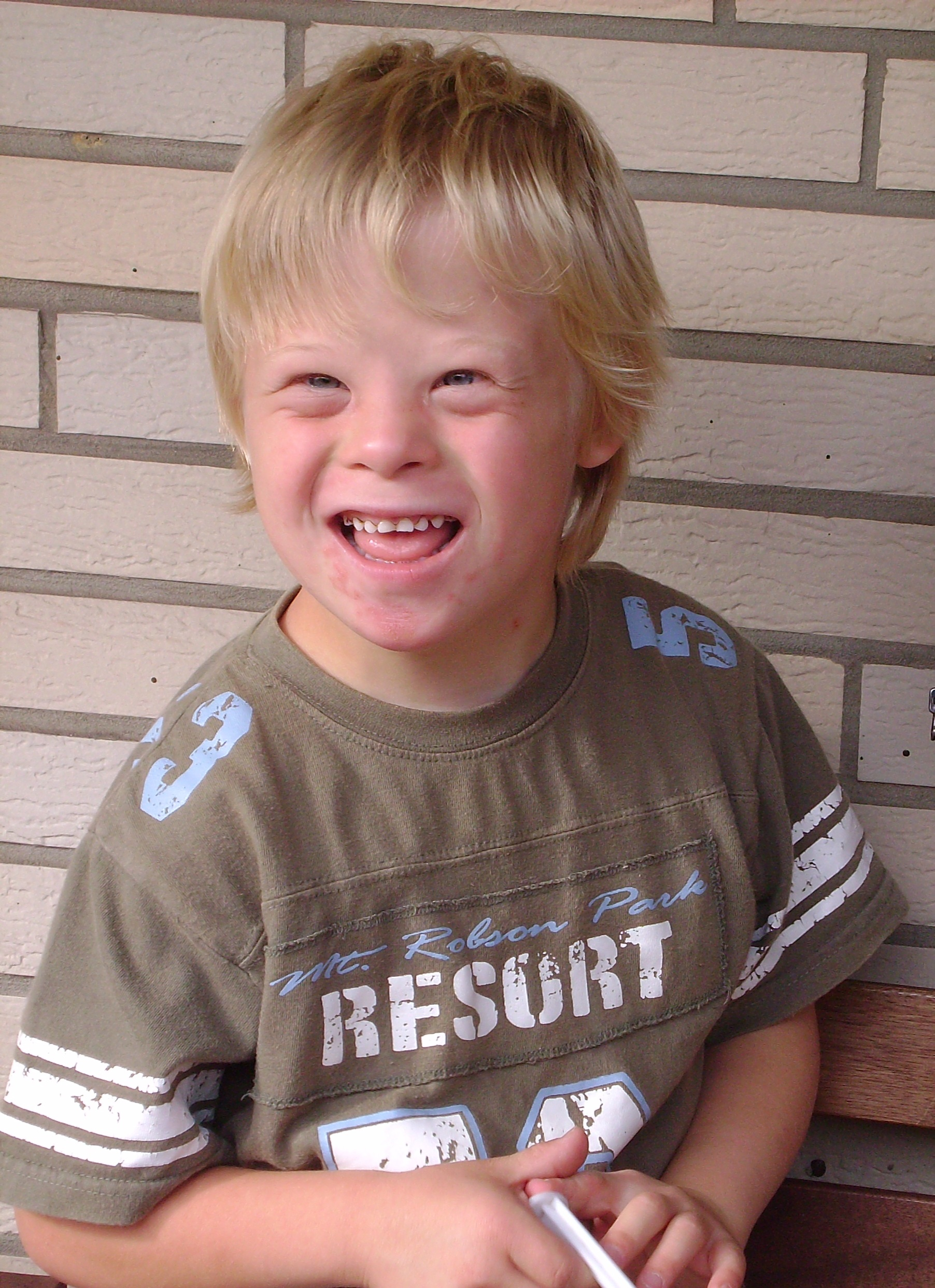
Down syndrome is the most common genetic cause of intellectual disability.

=== Genetic causes ===
Among children, the cause of intellectual disability is unknown for one-third to one-half of cases. About 5% of cases are inherited. Genetic defects that cause intellectual disability, but are not inherited, can be caused by accidents or mutations in genetic development. Examples of such accidents are development of an extra chromosome 18 (trisomy 18) and Down syndrome, which is the most common genetic cause. DiGeorge syndrome and fetal alcohol spectrum disorders are the next most common causes. Some other frequently observed causes include:

- Genetic conditions. Sometimes disability is caused by abnormal genes inherited from parents, errors when genes combine, or other reasons like de novo mutations in genes associated with intellectual disability. The most prevalent genetic conditions include Down syndrome, Klinefelter syndrome, Fragile X syndrome (common among boys), neurofibromatosis, congenital hypothyroidism, Williams syndrome, phenylketonuria (PKU), and Prader–Willi syndrome. Other genetic conditions include Phelan–McDermid syndrome (22q13del), Mowat–Wilson syndrome, genetic ciliopathy, and Siderius type X-linked intellectual disability (OMIM: 300263) as caused by mutations in the PHF8 gene (OMIM: 300560). In the rarest of cases, abnormalities with the X or Y chromosome may also cause disability. Tetrasomy X and pentasomy X syndrome affect a small number of girls worldwide, while boys may be affected by 49, XXXXY (Fraccaro syndrome), or 49, XYYYY. Jacobs syndrome (47, XYY) is not associated with significantly lowered IQ though affected individuals may have slightly lower IQs than non-affected siblings on average.
- Problems during pregnancy. Intellectual disability can result when the fetus does not develop properly. For example, there may be a problem with the way the fetus's cells divide as it grows. A pregnant woman who drinks alcohol or gets an infection like rubella during pregnancy may also have a baby with an intellectual disability.
- Problems at birth. If a baby has problems during labor and birth, such as not getting enough oxygen, they may have a developmental disability due to brain damage.
- The group of proteins known as histones have an essential part in gene regulation, and sometimes these proteins become modified and are prevented from working properly. When the genes responsible for the development of neurons are affected, it affects the brain and behavior in the individual.
- Exposure to certain types of disease or toxins. Diseases like whooping cough, measles, or meningitis can cause intellectual disability if medical care is delayed or inadequate. Exposure to poisons like lead or mercury may also affect mental ability.
- Iodine deficiency, affecting approximately 2 billion people worldwide, is the leading preventable cause of intellectual disability in areas of the developing world where iodine deficiency is endemic. Iodine deficiency also causes goiter, an enlargement of the thyroid gland. More common than full-fledged congenital iodine deficiency syndrome (formerly cretinism), as intellectual disability caused by severe iodine deficiency is called, is mild impairment of intelligence. Residents of certain areas of the world, due to natural deficiency and governmental inaction, are severely affected by iodine deficiency. India has 500 million people with a deficiency, 54 million with goiter, and 2 million with congenital iodine deficiency. Among other nations affected by iodine deficiency, China and Kazakhstan have instituted widespread salt iodization programs. But, as of 2006, Russia had not.
- Malnutrition is a common cause of reduced intelligence in parts of the world affected by famine, such as Ethiopia and nations struggling with extended periods of warfare that disrupt agriculture production and distribution.
- Absence of the arcuate fasciculus.
- Furthermore, lack of stimulation of sensory pathways in infants can also cause developmental and cognitive delays.

=== Developmental causes: Traumatic brain injury ===
Improvement of neurological function usually occurs for two or more years after the trauma though for others intellectual deficits and medical deficits could be chronic. For many years it was believed that recovery was fastest during the first six months, but there is no evidence to support this. It may be related to services commonly being withdrawn after this period, rather than any physiological limitation to further progress. Children recover better in the immediate time frame and improve for longer periods. Intellectual disability complications are distinct medical problems that may arise as a result of the TBI. The results of traumatic brain injury vary widely in type and duration; they include physical, cognitive, emotional, and behavioral complications. TBI can cause prolonged or permanent effects on consciousness, such as coma, brain death, persistent vegetative state (in which patients are unable to achieve a state of alertness to interact with their surroundings), and minimally conscious state (in which patients show minimal signs of being aware of self or environment).

Cognitive deficits that can follow TBI include impaired attention; disrupted insight, judgement, and thought; reduced processing speed; distractibility; and deficits in executive functions such as abstract reasoning, planning, problem-solving, and multitasking. Memory loss, the most common cognitive impairment among head-injured people, occurs in 20–79% of people with closed head trauma, depending on severity. People who have had TBI may also have difficulty with understanding or producing spoken or written language, or with more subtle aspects of communication such as body language. Post-concussion syndrome, a set of lasting symptoms experienced after mild TBI, can include physical, cognitive, emotional and behavioral problems such as headaches, dizziness, difficulty concentrating, and depression. Multiple TBIs may have a cumulative effect. A young person who receives a second concussion before symptoms from another one have healed may be at risk for developing a very rare but deadly condition called second-impact syndrome, in which the brain swells catastrophically after even a mild blow, with debilitating or deadly results. About one in five professional boxers is affected by the severe form of chronic traumatic encephalopathy (CTE), which causes cognitive, behavioral, and physical impairments that can present as dementia, and the tremors and lack of coordination of parkinsonism. CTE primarily affects boxers years after their career has ended.

=== Oncological sources: Oncology in the brain ===
A brain tumor (sometimes referred to as brain cancer) occurs when a group of cells within the brain grow out of control, creating a mass. There are two main types of tumors: malignant (cancerous) tumors and benign (non-cancerous) tumors. These can be further classified as primary tumors, which start within the brain, and secondary tumors, which most commonly have spread from tumors located outside the brain, known as brain metastasis tumors. All types of brain tumors may produce symptoms that vary depending on the size of the tumor and the part of the brain that is involved. Where symptoms exist, they may include headaches, seizures, problems with vision, vomiting, and both subtle or severe mental and intellectual changes. Other symptoms may include difficulty walking, speaking, with sensations, or unconsciousness.

The signs and symptoms of behavioral and intellectual deficits caused by brain tumors are broad. People may experience symptoms regardless of whether the tumor is benign (not cancerous) or cancerous. Primary and secondary brain tumors present with similar symptoms, depending on the location, size, and rate of growth of the tumor. For example, larger tumors in the frontal lobe can cause changes in the ability to think. However, a smaller tumor in an area such as Wernicke's area (small area responsible for language comprehension) can result in a greater loss of function and extensive loss of linguistically oriented intellectual abilities.

== Diagnosis ==
According to both the American Association on Intellectual and Developmental Disabilities and the American Psychiatric Association's Diagnostic and Statistical Manual of Mental Disorders (DSM-5), three criteria must be met for a diagnosis of intellectual disability: significant limitation in general mental abilities (intellectual functioning), significant limitations in one or more areas of adaptive behavior across multiple environments (as measured by an adaptive behavior rating scale, i.e. communication, self-help skills, interpersonal skills, and more), and evidence that the limitations became apparent in childhood or adolescence (onset during developmental phase).

DSM-5-TR also makes a separate diagnosis of global developmental delay, reserved for children younger than 5 years who fail to meet expected developmental milestones 'in several areas of intellectual functioning'. It applies to individuals who are unable to undergo systematic assessments of intellectual functioning.

In general, people with intellectual disabilities have an IQ below 70, but clinical discretion may be necessary for individuals who have a somewhat higher IQ but severe impairment in adaptive functioning.

It is formally diagnosed by an assessment of IQ and adaptive behavior. A third condition requiring onset during the developmental period is used to distinguish intellectual disability from other conditions, such as traumatic brain injuries and dementias (including Alzheimer's disease).

=== Intelligence quotient ===
The first English-language IQ test, the Stanford–Binet Intelligence Scales, was adapted from a test battery designed for school placement by Alfred Binet in France. Lewis Terman adapted Binet's test and promoted it as a test measuring "general intelligence". Terman's test was the first widely used mental test to report scores in "intelligence quotient" form ("mental age" divided by chronological age, multiplied by 100). Current tests are scored in "deviation IQ" form, with a performance level by a test-taker two standard deviations below the median score for the test-takers age group defined as IQ 70. Until the most recent revision of diagnostic standards, an IQ of 70 or below was a primary factor for intellectual disability diagnosis, and IQ scores were used to categorize degrees of intellectual disability.

Since the current diagnosis of intellectual disability is not based on IQ scores alone, but must also take into consideration a person's adaptive functioning, the diagnosis is not made rigidly. It encompasses intellectual scores, adaptive functioning scores from an adaptive behavior rating scale based on descriptions of known abilities provided by someone familiar with the person, and also the observations of the assessment examiner, who is able to find out directly from the person what they can understand, communicate, and such like. IQ assessment must be based on a current test. This enables a diagnosis to avoid the pitfall of the Flynn effect, which is a consequence of changes in population IQ test performance changing IQ test norms over time.

=== Levels of intellectual disability ===
Over time, IQ scores have been varyingly used to diagnose severity levels of intellectual disability: mild, moderate, severe, and profound. When compared to IQ classification ranges for disability, the disabled still show signs of useful linguistic verbal ability at approximately 70 IQ, though significant loss of verbal ability is markedly present once disability levels below 30 IQ are observed. Under the DSM-I and DSM-II, approximate IQ ranges were given, but both IQ test scores and level of functioning were to be used to diagnose a severity of intellectual disability (then called "mental deficiency" and "mental retardation" in the DSM-I and DSM-II respectively). The DSM-III and DSM-IV gave IQ ranges to use to classify severity levels of mental retardation but did not mention level of functioning as another criterion, although the DSM-IV had overlaps between the IQ ranges for severity levels, allowing clinical discretion for individuals scoring within those ranges.

IQ ranges for mental retardation severity levels in the DSM-IV
Severity level	Minimum IQ range	Maximum IQ range
Mild	50–55	Approx. 70
Moderate	35–40	50–55
Severe	20–25	35–40
Profound		20–25

Under the DSM-V, however, a severity level of intellectual disability is to be diagnosed based solely on adaptive functioning, without using an IQ score as a criterion. The manual explains that this is because adaptive functioning, not IQ scores, is what determines the amount of support needed, and also notes lower validity of IQ tests in the lower range. For example, floor effects make distinguishing between severe and profound intellectual disability solely based on IQ score difficult.

=== Distinction from other disabilities ===
Disabilities affecting intellectual abilities, is a broader concept that includes intellectual deficits that are too mild to properly qualify as intellectual disability, or too specific (as in specific learning disability), or acquired later in life through acquired brain injuries or neurodegenerative diseases like dementia. Cognitive deficits may appear at any age. Developmental disability is any disability that is due to problems with growth and development. This term encompasses many congenital medical conditions that have no mental or intellectual components, although it, too, is sometimes used as a euphemism for intellectual disability.

Elderly people with late-stage, or severe, dementia and its associated intellectual disabilities typically turn increasingly inward and need assistance with most or all of their personal care. 24-hour supervision to meet basic needs and ensure personal safety is usually needed. If left unsupervised, they may wander or fall, fail to recognize common dangers such as a hot stove, or fail to realize that they need to use the bathroom and become incontinent. Both urinary and fecal incontinence may become prominent features that can prove challenging for both the person affected and the caregiver. They may not want to get out of bed, or may need assistance doing so. They may also struggle to walk. Commonly, the person no longer recognizes familiar faces. Sleep disturbances become more common and worsen in this stage.

Changes in eating frequently occur. Cognitive awareness is needed for eating and swallowing and progressive cognitive decline in advanced dementia, can result in eating and swallowing difficulties. This can cause food to be refused, or choked on, and help with feeding will often be required. For ease of feeding, food may be liquidized into a thick purée. The use of a feeding tube is not recommended; there are many complications and unwanted consequences associated with tube feeding. Paradoxical lucidity, an unexpected transient recovery of mental clarity, can occur in some cases. Terminal lucidity may manifest shortly before death.

=== Limitations in more than one area ===
Adaptive behavior, or adaptive functioning, refers to the skills needed to live independently (or at the minimally acceptable level for age). To assess adaptive behavior, professionals compare the functional abilities of a child to those of other children of similar age. To measure adaptive behavior, professionals use structured interviews, with which they systematically elicit information about persons' functioning in the community from people who know them well. There are many adaptive behavior scales, and accurate assessment of the quality of someone's adaptive behavior requires clinical judgment as well. Certain skills are important to adaptive behavior, such as:

- Daily living skills, such as getting dressed, using the bathroom, and feeding oneself
- Communication skills, such as understanding what is said and being able to answer
- Social skills with peers, family members, spouses, adults, and others

Other specific skills can be critical to an individual's inclusion in the community and to develop appropriate social behaviors, as for example being aware of the different social expectations linked to the principal lifespan stages (i.e., childhood, adulthood, old age). The results of a Swiss study suggest that the performance of adults with ID in recognizing different lifespan stages is related to specific cognitive abilities and to the type of material used to test this performance.

== Demographics and management ==
=== Epidemiology ===
Intellectual disability affects about 2–3% of the general population. 75–90% of the affected people have mild intellectual disability. Non-syndromic or idiopathic ID accounts for 30–50% of cases. About a quarter of cases are caused by a genetic disorder. Cases of unknown cause affect about 95 million people as of 2013. It is more common in males and in low to middle income countries.

=== Clinical geropsychology ===
Clinical geropsychiatrists have specialized training to address problems such as depression, anxiety, neurocognitive disorders (e.g., dementia, mild cognitive impairment [MCI]) caused by problems such as Alzheimer's disease, caregiver stress, grief and bereavement, end-of-life care issues, and physical health problems (e.g., sleep disorders, diabetes, cardiovascular disease). Geropsychologists are also sensitive to multicultural issues of aging in clinical practice, research, and policy (gerodiversity). Geropsychologists provide psychological assessment and intervention to older adults and their families, as well as consultation services to other health care professionals. These psychological services are provided in a variety of settings and contexts, including private practice, community mental health, integrated medical settings (e.g., primary care), rehabilitation care, inpatient psychiatric settings, residential care, long-term care, adult day health programs, and many other settings. Geropsychologists are also trained to work in universities, academic hospitals and medical settings, research institutes, and public policy settings.

In 1946, Sydney Pressey, PhD., and a coalition of supporters helped establish the Adult Development and Aging Division of the American Psychological Association (APA) devoted to the study of older adults and adult development. The APA approved the Adult Development and Aging Division with a vote of 20 to 3, thus establishing it as the first aging-related expansion of the APA. In 1959, the National Institute of Mental Health (NIMH) established a section devoted to aging, and appointed James Emmett Birren, PhD, as chief of this division. Birren's research focused on neurological, sensory, perceptual and cognitive functions in aging, and he is often considered the first modern experimental aging researcher. As the chief of the section on aging at NIMH, he was instrumental as an organizer and promoter of the field. He developed and edited the Handbook of the Psychology of Aging, became editor-in-chief of the Journal Gerontology, and eventually went on to become the president of the Gerontological Society of America.

=== Clinical designations ===
By most definitions, intellectual disability when not related to a specific medical condition is more accurately considered a disability rather than a disease. Intellectual disability can be distinguished in many ways from mental illness, such as schizophrenia or depression. Currently, there is no "cure" for an established disability, though with appropriate support and teaching, most individuals can learn to do many things. Causes, such as congenital hypothyroidism, if detected early may be treated to prevent the development of an intellectual disability.

There are thousands of agencies around the world that provide assistance for people with developmental disabilities. They include state-run, for-profit, and non-profit, privately run agencies. Within one agency there could be departments that include fully staffed residential homes, day rehabilitation programs that approximate schools, workshops wherein people with disabilities can obtain jobs, programs that assist people with developmental disabilities in obtaining jobs in the community, programs that provide support for people with developmental disabilities who have their own apartments, programs that assist them with raising their children, and many more. There are also many agencies and programs for parents of children with developmental disabilities.

Beyond that, there are specific programs that people with developmental disabilities can take part in wherein they learn basic life skills. These "goals" may take a much longer amount of time for them to accomplish, but the ultimate goal is independence. This may be anything from independence in tooth brushing to an independent residence. People with developmental disabilities learn throughout their lives and can obtain many new skills even late in life with the help of their families, caregivers, clinicians and the people who coordinate the efforts of all of these people.

There are four broad areas of intervention that allow for active participation from caregivers, community members, clinicians, and of course, the individual(s) with an intellectual disability. These include psychosocial treatments, behavioral treatments, cognitive-behavioral treatments, and family-oriented strategies. Psychosocial treatments are intended primarily for children before and during the preschool years as this is the optimum time for intervention. This early intervention should include encouragement of exploration, mentoring in basic skills, celebration of developmental advances, guided rehearsal and extension of newly acquired skills, protection from harmful displays of disapproval, teasing, or punishment, and exposure to a rich and responsive language environment. A great example of a successful intervention is the Carolina Abecedarian Project that was conducted with over 100 children from low socioeconomic status families beginning in infancy through pre-school years. Results indicated that by age 2, the children provided the intervention had higher test scores than control group children, and they remained approximately 5 points higher 10 years after the end of the program. By young adulthood, children from the intervention group had better educational attainment, employment opportunities, and fewer behavioral problems than their control-group counterparts.

Core components of behavioral treatments include language and social skills acquisition. Typically, one-to-one training is offered in which a therapist uses a shaping procedure in combination with positive reinforcements to help the child pronounce syllables until words are completed. Sometimes involving pictures and visual aids, therapists aim at improving speech capacity so that short sentences about important daily tasks (e.g. bathroom use, eating, etc.) can be effectively communicated by the child. In a similar fashion, older children benefit from this type of training as they learn to sharpen their social skills such as sharing, taking turns, following instruction, and smiling. At the same time, a movement known as social inclusion attempts to increase valuable interactions between children with an intellectual disability and their non-disabled peers. Cognitive-behavioral treatments, a combination of the previous two treatment types, involves a strategical-metastrategical learning technique that teaches children math, language, and other basic skills pertaining to memory and learning. The first goal of the training is to teach the child to be a strategical thinker through making cognitive connections and plans. Then, the therapist teaches the child to be metastrategical by teaching them to discriminate among different tasks and determine which plan or strategy suits each task. Finally, family-oriented strategies delve into empowering the family with the skill set they need to support and encourage their child or children with an intellectual disability. In general, this includes teaching assertiveness skills or behavior management techniques as well as how to ask for help from neighbors, extended family, or day-care staff. As the child ages, parents are then taught how to approach topics such as housing/residential care, employment, and relationships. The ultimate goal for every intervention or technique is to give the child autonomy and a sense of independence using the acquired skills they have. In a 2019 Cochrane review on beginning reading interventions for children and adolescents with intellectual disability, small to moderate improvements in phonological awareness, word reading, decoding, expressive and receptive language skills, and reading fluency were noted when these elements were part of the teaching intervention. Overall, about a third of people with ID do not learn how to read, another third learn to recognize sight words and how to sound out words, and the other third learn to read fairly well.

Although there is no specific medication for intellectual disability, many people with developmental disabilities have further medical complications and may be prescribed several medications. Use of psychotropic medications such as benzodiazepines in people with intellectual disability requires monitoring and vigilance, as side effects occur commonly and are often misdiagnosed as behavioral and psychiatric problems. A 2025 scoping review of comparative studies found that mental health interventions for individuals with intellectual disability have been studied most often for challenging behaviors, with fewer studies addressing diagnosed mental health disorders and limited evidence involving people with severe or profound intellectual disability.

== History and sociology ==
Intellectual disability has been documented under a variety of names throughout history. Throughout much of human history, society was incredibly discriminatory towards those with any type of disability, and people with intellectual disability were commonly viewed as burdens on their families.

Greek and Roman philosophers, who valued reasoning abilities, disparaged people with intellectual disability as barely human. The oldest physiological view of intellectual disability is in the writings of Hippocrates in the late fifth century BCE, who believed that it was caused by an imbalance in the four humors in the brain. In ancient Rome people with intellectual disabilities had limited rights and were generally looked down upon. They were considered property and could be kept slaves by their father. These people could also not marry, hold office, or raise children. Many of them were killed early in the childhood, and then dumped into the Tiber in order to avoid them burdening society. However, they were exempt from their crimes under Roman law, and they were also used to perform menial labor.

Caliph Al-Walid (r. 705–715) built one of the first care homes for individuals with intellectual disabilities and built the first hospital which accommodated intellectually disabled individuals as part of its services. In addition, Al-Walid assigned each intellectually disabled individual a caregiver.

Until the Enlightenment in Europe, care and asylum was provided by families and the church (in monasteries and other religious communities), focusing on the provision of basic physical needs such as food, shelter, and clothing. Negative stereotypes were prominent in social attitudes of the time.

In the 13th century, England declared people with intellectual disabilities to be incapable of making decisions or managing their affairs. Guardianships were created to take over their financial affairs.

In the 17th century, Thomas Willis provided the first description of intellectual disability as a disease. He believed that it was caused by structural problems in the brain. According to Willis, the anatomical problems could be either an inborn condition or acquired later in life.

The first known person in the British colonies with an intellectual disability was Benoni Buck, son of Richard Buck, whose life and guardianship battles provide significant insight into the early legal and social treatment of people with disabilities in what is now the United States.

In the 18th and 19th centuries, housing and care moved away from families and towards an asylum model. People were placed by, or removed from, their families (usually in infancy) and housed in large professional institutions, many of which were self-sufficient through the labor of the residents. Some of these institutions provided a very basic level of education (such as differentiation between colors and basic word recognition and numeracy), but most continued to focus solely on the provision of basic needs of food, clothing, and shelter. Conditions in such institutions varied widely, but the support provided was generally non-individualized, with aberrant behavior and low levels of economic productivity regarded as a burden to society. Individuals of higher wealth were often able to afford higher degrees of care such as home care or private asylums. Heavy tranquilization and assembly-line methods of support were the norm, and the medical model of disability prevailed. Services were provided based on the relative ease to the provider, not based on the needs of the individual. A survey taken in 1891 in Cape Town, South Africa shows the distribution between different facilities. Out of 2,046 persons surveyed, 1,281 were in private dwellings, 120 in jails, and 645 in asylums, with men representing nearly two-thirds of the number surveyed. In situations of scarcity of accommodation, preference was given to white men and Black men.

In the late 19th century, in response to Charles Darwin's On the Origin of Species, Francis Galton proposed selective breeding of humans to reduce intellectual disability. Early in the 20th century, the eugenics movement became popular throughout the world. This led to forced sterilization and prohibition of marriage in most of the developed world and was later used by Adolf Hitler as a rationale for killing people with intellectual disability during Aktion T4. Eugenics was later abandoned as a violation of human rights, and the practice of forced sterilization and prohibition from marriage was discontinued by most of the developed world by the mid-20th century.

In 1905, Alfred Binet produced the first standardized test for measuring intelligence in children.

Although ancient Roman law had declared people with intellectual disability to be incapable of the deliberate intent to harm that was necessary for a person to commit a crime, during the 1920s, Western society believed they were morally degenerate.

Ignoring the prevailing attitude, U.S.-based Civitans adopted service to people with developmental disabilities as a major organizational emphasis in 1952. Their earliest efforts included workshops for special education teachers and day camps for children with disabilities, all at a time when such training and programs were almost nonexistent. The segregation of people with developmental disabilities was not widely questioned by academics or policy-makers until the 1969 publication of Wolf Wolfensberger's seminal work "The Origin and Nature of Our Institutional Models", drawing on some of the ideas proposed by S. G. Howe 100 years earlier. This study posited that society characterizes people with disabilities as deviant, sub-human and burdens of charity, resulting in the adoption of that "deviant" role. Wolfensberger argued that this dehumanization, and the segregated institutions that result from it, ignored the potential productive contributions that all people can make to society. He pushed for a shift in policy and practice that recognized the human needs of those with intellectual disability and provided the same basic human rights as for the rest of the population.

This publication may be regarded as the first move towards the widespread adoption of the social model of disability in regard to these types of disabilities, and was the impetus for the development of government strategies for desegregation. Successful lawsuits against governments and increasing awareness of human rights and self-advocacy also contributed to this process, resulting in the passing in the U.S. of the Civil Rights of Institutionalized Persons Act in 1980.

From the 1960s to the present, most states have moved towards the elimination of segregated institutions. Normalization and deinstitutionalization are common. Along with the work of Wolfensberger and others including Gunnar and Rosemary Dybwad, a number of scandalous revelations around the horrific conditions within state institutions created public outrage that led to change to a more community-based method of providing services.

By the mid-1970s, most governments had committed to de-institutionalization and had started preparing for the wholesale movement of people into the general community, in line with the principles of normalization. In most countries, this was essentially complete by the late 1990s, although the debate over whether or not to close institutions persists in some states, including Massachusetts.

In the past, lead poisoning and infectious diseases were significant causes of intellectual disability. Some causes of intellectual disability are decreasing, as medical advances, such as vaccination, increase. Other causes are increasing as a proportion of cases, perhaps due to rising maternal age, which is associated with several syndromic forms of intellectual disability.

Along with the changes in terminology, and the downward drift in acceptability of the old terms, institutions of all kinds have had to repeatedly change their names. This affects the names of schools, hospitals, societies, government departments, and academic journals. For example, the Midlands Institute of Mental Sub-normality became the British Institute of Mental Handicap and is now the British Institute of Learning Disability. This phenomenon is shared with mental health and motor disabilities, and seen to a lesser degree in sensory disabilities.

=== Terminology ===
Over the two decades since 2010, the term intellectual disability has become preferred by most advocates and researchers in most English-speaking countries. In a 2012 survey of 101 Canadian healthcare professionals, 78% said they would use the term developmental delay with parents over intellectual disability (8%). Expressions like developmentally disabled, special, special needs, or challenged are sometimes used, but have been criticized for "reinforc[ing] the idea that people cannot deal honestly with their disabilities".

The term mental retardation, which stemmed from the understanding that such conditions arose as a result of delays or retardation of a child's natural development, was used in the American Psychiatric Association's DSM-IV (1994) and in the World Health Organization's ICD-10 (codes F70–F79). In the next revision, ICD-11, it was replaced by the term "disorders of intellectual development" (codes 6A00–6A04; 6A00.Z for the "unspecified" diagnosis code). The term "intellectual disability (intellectual developmental disorder)" is used in the DSM-5 (2013). The term "mental retardation" is still used in some professional settings such as governmental aid programs or health insurance paperwork, where "mental retardation" is specifically covered but "intellectual disability" is not.

Historical terms for intellectual disability eventually become perceived as an insult, in a process commonly known as the euphemism treadmill. The terms mental retardation and mentally retarded became popular in the middle of the 20th century to replace the previous set of terms, which included "imbecile", "idiot", "feeble-minded", and "moron", among others, and are now considered offensive. By the end of the 20th century, retardation and retard had become widely seen as disparaging, ableist, politically incorrect, and in need of replacement.

Usage has changed over the years and differed from country to country. For example, mental retardation in some contexts covers the whole field, but it previously applied to people with milder impairments. Feeble-minded used to mean mild impairments in the UK, and once applied in the US to the whole field. "Borderline intellectual functioning" is not currently defined, but the term may be used to apply to people with IQs in the 70s. People with IQs of 70 to 85 used to be eligible for special consideration in the US public education system on grounds of intellectual disability.

==== United States ====
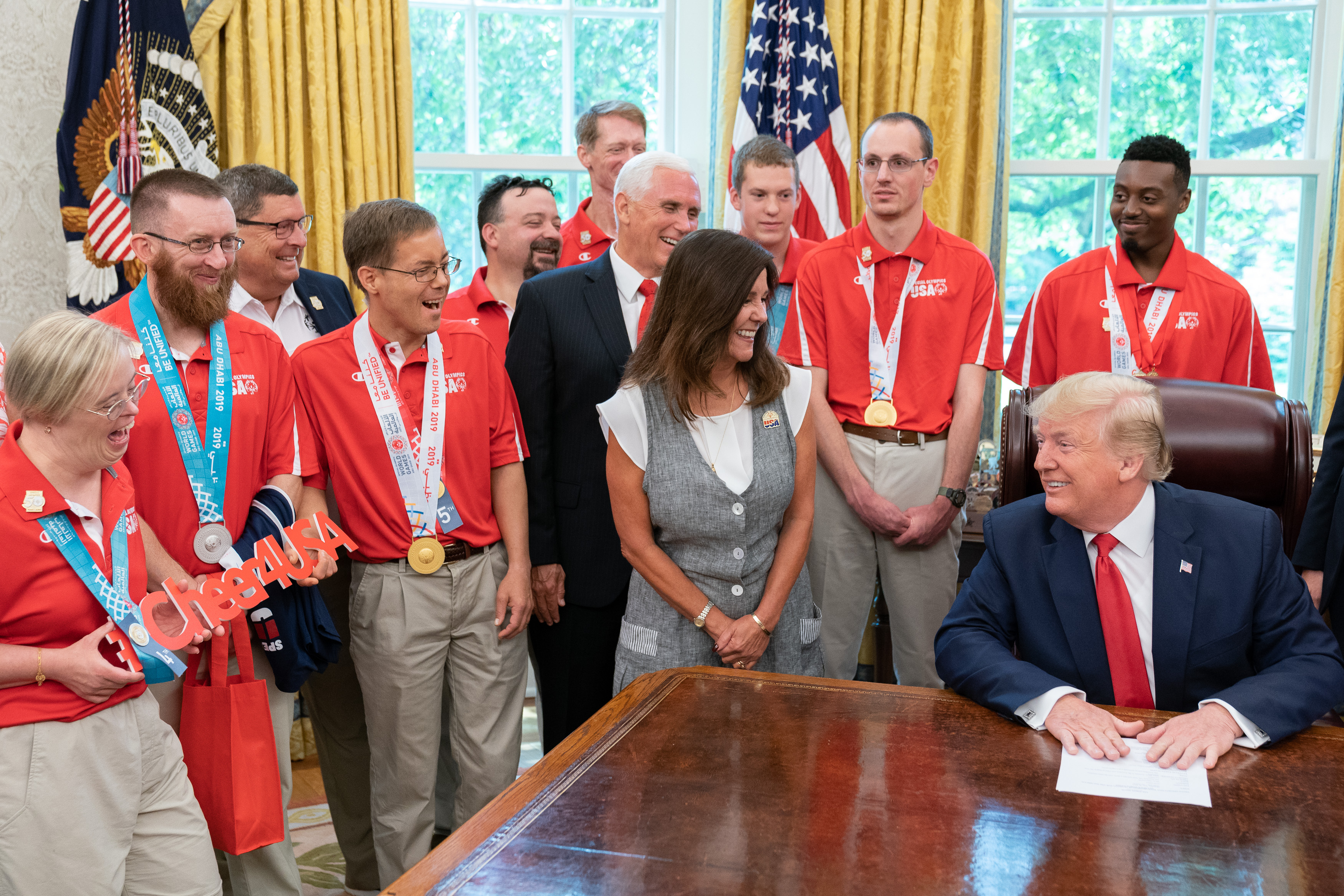
Special Olympics USA team in July 2019

- In North America, intellectual disability is subsumed into the broader term developmental disability, which also includes epilepsy, autism, cerebral palsy, and other disorders that develop during the developmental period (birth to age 18). Because service provision is tied to the designation "developmental disability", it is used by many parents, direct support professionals, and physicians. In the United States, however, in school-based settings, the more specific term mental retardation or, more recently (and preferably), intellectual disability, is still typically used, and is one of 13 categories of disability under which children may be identified for special education services under Public Law 108–446.
- The phrase intellectual disability is increasingly being used as a synonym for people with significantly below-average cognitive ability. These terms are sometimes used as a means of separating general intellectual limitations from specific, limited deficits as well as indicating that it is not an emotional or psychological disability. It is not specific to congenital disorders such as Down syndrome.

The American Association on Mental Retardation changed its name to the American Association on Intellectual and Developmental Disabilities (AAIDD) in 2007, and soon thereafter changed the names of its scholarly journals to reflect the term "intellectual disability". In 2010, the AAIDD released its 11th edition of its terminology and classification manual, which also used the term intellectual disability.

==== United Kingdom ====
In the UK, mental handicap had become the common medical term, replacing mental subnormality in Scotland and mental deficiency in England and Wales, until Stephen Dorrell, Secretary of State for Health for the United Kingdom from 1995 to 1997, changed the NHS's designation to learning disability. The new term is not yet widely understood, and is often taken to refer to problems affecting schoolwork (the American usage), which are known in the UK as "learning difficulties". British social workers may use "learning difficulty" to refer to both people with intellectual disability and those with conditions such as dyslexia. In education, "learning difficulties" is applied to a wide range of conditions: "specific learning difficulty" may refer to dyslexia, dyscalculia or developmental coordination disorder, while "moderate learning difficulties", "severe learning difficulties" and "profound learning difficulties" refer to more significant impairments. The term "Profound and Multiple Learning Disability/ies" (PMLD) is used: the NHS describes PMLD as "when a person has a severe learning disability and other disabilities that significantly affect their ability to communicate and be independent".

In England and Wales between 1983 and 2008, the Mental Health Act 1983 defined "mental impairment" and "severe mental impairment" as "a state of arrested or incomplete development of mind which includes significant/severe impairment of intelligence and social functioning and is associated with abnormally aggressive or seriously irresponsible conduct on the part of the person concerned." As behavior was involved, these were not necessarily permanent conditions: they were defined for the purpose of authorizing detention in hospital or guardianship. The term mental impairment was removed from the Act in November 2008, but the grounds for detention remained. However, English statute law uses mental impairment elsewhere in a less well-defined manner—e.g. to allow exemption from taxes—implying that intellectual disability without any behavioral problems is what is meant.

A 2008 BBC poll conducted in the United Kingdom came to the conclusion that 'retard' (in the slang senses) was the most offensive disability-related word. On the reverse side of that, when a contestant on Celebrity Big Brother live used the phrase "walking like a retard", despite complaints from the public and the charity Mencap, the communications regulator Ofcom did not uphold the complaint saying "it was not used in an offensive context [...] and had been used light-heartedly". It was, however, noted that two previous similar complaints from other shows were upheld. Using ableist slang terms like 'retard' and 'spastic' is a sign of strong disrespect and discrimination to people with disabilities.

==== Australia ====
In the past, Australia has used British and American terms interchangeably, including "mental retardation" and "mental handicap". Today, "intellectual disability" is the preferred and more commonly used descriptor.

=== Society and culture ===
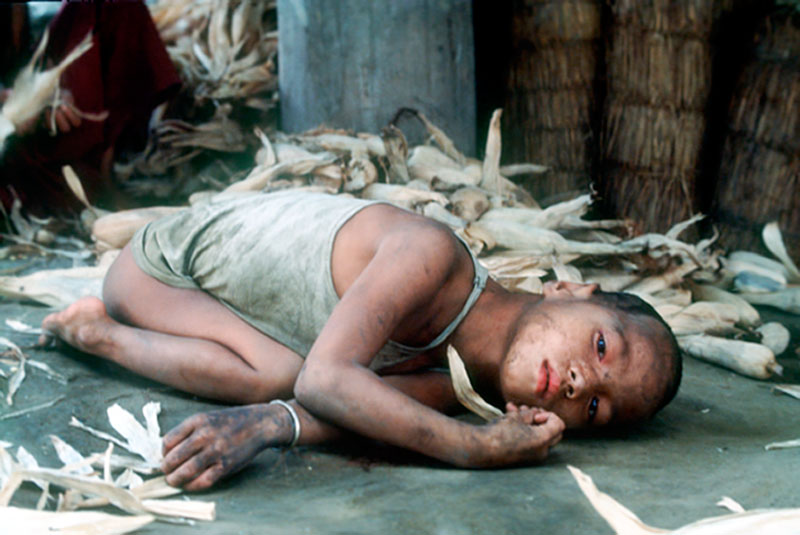
Severely disabled girl in Bhutan

People with intellectual disabilities are often not seen as full citizens of society. Person-centered planning and approaches are seen as methods of addressing the continued labeling and exclusion of socially devalued people, such as people with disabilities, encouraging a focus on the person as someone with capacities and gifts as well as support needs. The self-advocacy movement promotes the right of self-determination and self-direction by people with intellectual disabilities, which means allowing them to make decisions about their own lives.

Until the middle of the 20th century, people with intellectual disabilities were routinely excluded from public education, or educated away from other typically developing children. Compared to peers who were segregated in special schools, students who are mainstreamed or included in regular classrooms report similar levels of stigma and social self-conception, but more ambitious plans for employment. As adults, they may live independently, with family members, or in different types of institutions organized to support people with disabilities. About 8% currently live in an institution or a group home.

In the United States, the average lifetime cost of a person with an intellectual disability amounts to $223,000 per person, in 2003 US dollars, for direct costs such as medical and educational expenses. The indirect costs were estimated at $771,000, due to shorter lifespans and lower than average economic productivity. The total direct and indirect costs, which amount to a little more than a million dollars, are slightly more than the economic costs associated with cerebral palsy, and double that associated with serious vision or hearing impairments. Of the costs, about 14% is due to increased medical expenses (not including what is normally incurred by the typical person), and 10% is due to direct non-medical expenses, such as the excess cost of special education compared to standard schooling. The largest amount, 76%, is indirect costs accounting for reduced productivity and shortened lifespans. Some expenses, such as ongoing costs to family caregivers or the extra costs associated with living in a group home, were excluded from this calculation.

=== Human rights and legal status ===
The law treats person with intellectual disabilities differently than those without intellectual disabilities. Their human rights and freedoms, including the right to vote, the right to conduct business, enter into a contract, enter into marriage, right to education, are often limited. The courts have upheld some of these limitations and found discrimination in others. The UN Convention on the Rights of Persons with Disabilities, which sets minimum standards for the rights of persons with disabilities, has been ratified by more than 180 countries. In several European Union states, persons with intellectual disabilities are disenfranchised. The European Court of Human Rights ruled in Alajos Kiss v. Hungary (2010) that Hungary cannot restrict voting rights only on the basis of guardianship due to a psychosocial disability.

=== Health disparities ===
People with intellectual disabilities are usually at a higher risk of complex health conditions such as epilepsy and neurological disorders, gastrointestinal disorders, and behavioral and psychiatric problems compared to people without disabilities. Adults also have a higher prevalence of poor social determinants of health, behavioral risk factors, depression, diabetes, and poor or fair health status than adults without intellectual disability.

Studies from the United Kingdom show people there with intellectual disability live on average 16 years less than the general population. Some of the barriers that exist for people with ID accessing quality healthcare include: communication challenges, service eligibility, lack of training for healthcare providers, diagnostic overshadowing, and absence of targeted health promotion services. Key recommendations from the CDC for improving the health status for people with intellectual disabilities include: improve access to health care, improve data collection, strengthen the workforce, include people with ID in public health programs, and prepare for emergencies with people with disabilities in mind.

== See also ==
- Future planning
- History of psychiatric institutions
- IQ classification
- Intermediate Care Facilities for Individuals with Intellectual Disabilities
- Severe mental impairment
- Intellectual disability and higher education in the United States
