= List of institutions providing special education facilities =

This is a list of institutions providing special education facilities, educating students in a way that accommodates their individual differences, disabilities, and special needs.

== Canada ==
- Child and Parent Resource Institute, London, Ontario

== United States ==
=== California ===
- Agnews Insane Asylum (1885–c. 2014), Santa Clara, California
- Banksia Sanitarium (closed), Los Angeles, California
- Camarillo State Mental Hospital (1936–1997), Camarillo, California
- Gardner Sanitarium (1900–1922), Ralston Hall, Belmont, California
- Lanterman State Hospital and Developmental Center (1921–2015), Pomona, California
- Livermore Sanitarium (1895–1965), Livermore, California
- Mendocino State Asylum for the Insane (later Mendocino State Hospital; 1889–1972), Talmage, California
- Modesto State Hospital (1946–1972), Modesto, California
- Napa State Hospital (1875–present), Napa, California
- Park Sanitarium (closed), Masonic at Page Street, San Francisco, California
- San Francisco Marine Hospital (1853–1912), San Francisco, California
- Sonoma Developmental Center (1891–2018), Eldridge, California
- Stockton State Insane Asylum (1853–1996), Stockton, California
- Sunshine School (1937–1970s), San Francisco, California

=== Colorado ===
- Woodcroft Hospital and School for Feeble Minded Children (also known as Woodcroft Sanitorium; 1896–1917), Pueblo, Colorado

=== Connecticut ===
- Southbury Training School (1930s–present), Southbury, Connecticut

=== Iowa ===
- Iowa Institution for Feeble-Minded Children (now Glenwood Resource Center; 1866–2024), Loess Hills, Iowa

=== Maine ===
- Pineland Farms (or Pineland Hospital and Training Center; 1908–1996), New Gloucester, Maine

=== Maryland ===
- Crownsville Hospital Center (1911–2004), Crownsville, Maryland

=== Massachusetts ===
- Institution for Idiots, Barre, Massachusetts, 1848 founded 1848 by Dr. Hervey B. Wilbur
- Massachusetts School for the Feeble-Minded, 1848, founded by Samuel Gridley Howe
- The School for the Feeble-minded, Waltham, Massachusetts
- Walter E. Fernald State School, 1848, Massachusetts

=== Minnesota ===
- School for the Feeble-Minded and Colony for Epileptics, Faribault, Minnesota

=== New Hampshire ===
- The School for the Feeble-minded, Laconia, New Hampshire

=== New Jersey ===
- Brookfield Schools, southern New Jersey
- E. R. Johnstone Training and Research Center, Bordentown, New Jersey
- Vineland Training School, 1888, Vineland, New Jersey, founded by Reverend S. Olin Garrison

=== New York (state) ===
- East Aurora Colony House, New York
- The Idiot School, 1866, Randalls Island House of Refuge, East River, New York
- Newark State School, 1878, New York
- Private Institute for Imbeciles, 1856, Brooklyn, New York, founded by James B. Richards
- St. Josephs Protectory, West Seneca, New York
- Syracuse State School, 1853, New York
- Willowbrook State School, Staten Island, New York

=== North Dakota ===
- Grafton State School, Now Life Skills and Transition Center, North Dakota

=== Oregon ===
- Fairview Training Center, 1908, Oregon

=== Pennsylvania ===
- Elwyn Training School, Media, Pennsylvania, founded 1852 by Alfred L. Elwyn
- Pennhurst State School, Pennsylvania

== See also ==
- Individuals with Disabilities Education Act (IDEA)
- State schools, US (for people with disabilities)
- Training school (United States)
