= East River Houses =

Public housing development in Manhattan, New York

- NYCHA Property
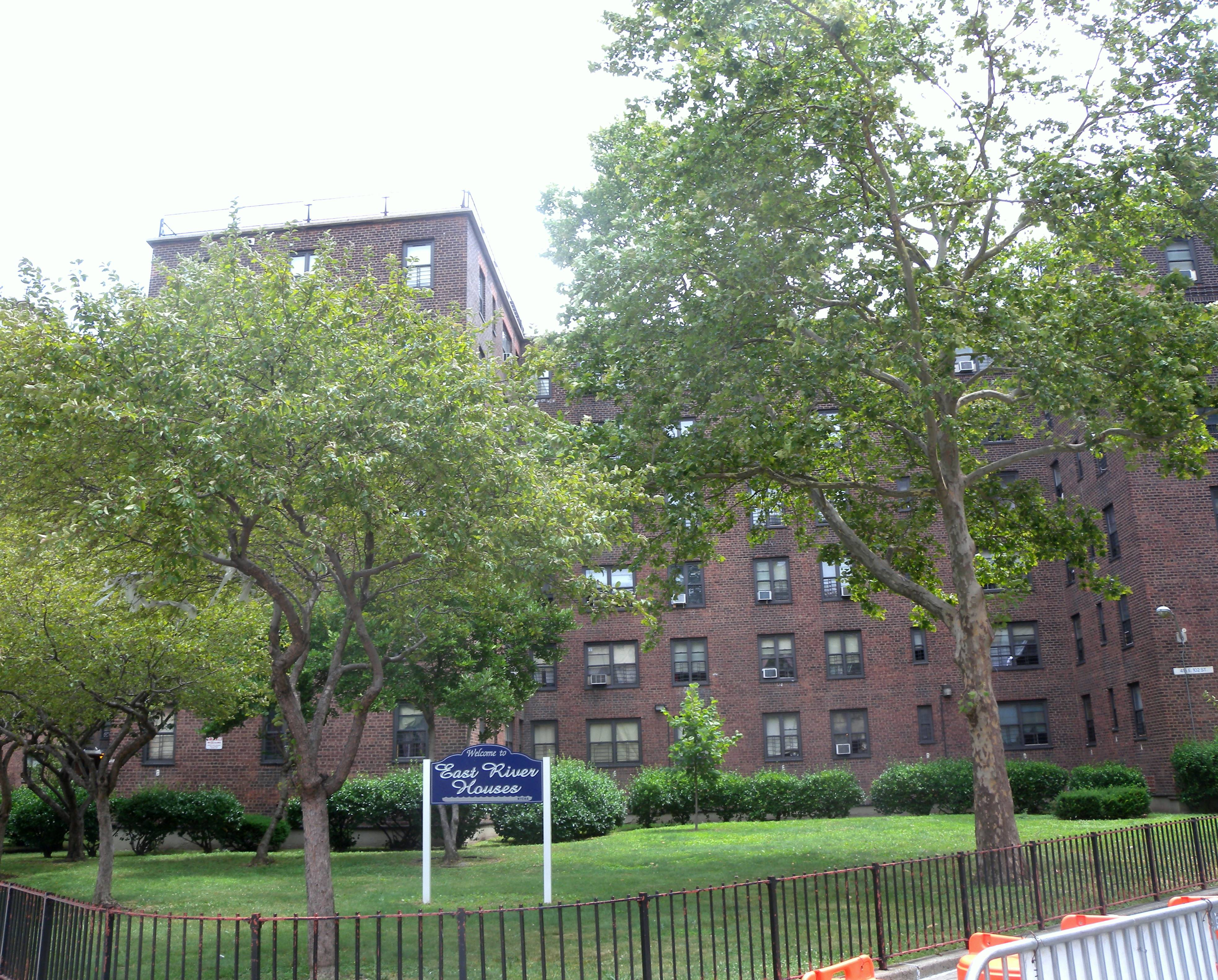
- Interactive map of East River Houses
- Country: United States
- State: New York
- City: New York City
- Borough: Manhattan

Area
  - Total: 10.69 acres (4.33 ha)

Population
  - Total: 2,020
- Zip Code: 10029

East River Houses are a public housing project that is part of the New York City Housing Authority (NYCHA). The housing complex is located between 102nd to 105th Street and between 1st Avenue and the FDR Drive in the Spanish Harlem portion of the East Harlem neighborhood of Manhattan in New York City. It contains 10 separate buildings. Building I has 11 floors, Buildings II, III, (Note: Taller Part of the Building Only) IV, and V have 10 floors, and Buildings III, (Note: Shorter Part of the Building Only) IV, VI, VII, VIII, IX, and X have 6 floors.

== History ==
The groundbreaking ceremony for the $6.8 million low-rent housing complex—the fourth public housing project in Manhattan—was held on March 2, 1940 and attended by Mayor Fiorello La Guardia, Borough President Stanley M. Isaacs, Congressman Vito Marcantonio, and Nathan Straus from the United States Housing Authority. The first tenants began moving into the housing complex in April 1941; the project was completed in May 1941. The firm of Voorhees, Walker, Foley & Smith served as the chief architect of the East River Houses, with C. W. Schlusing and Alfred Easton Poor serving as associates.

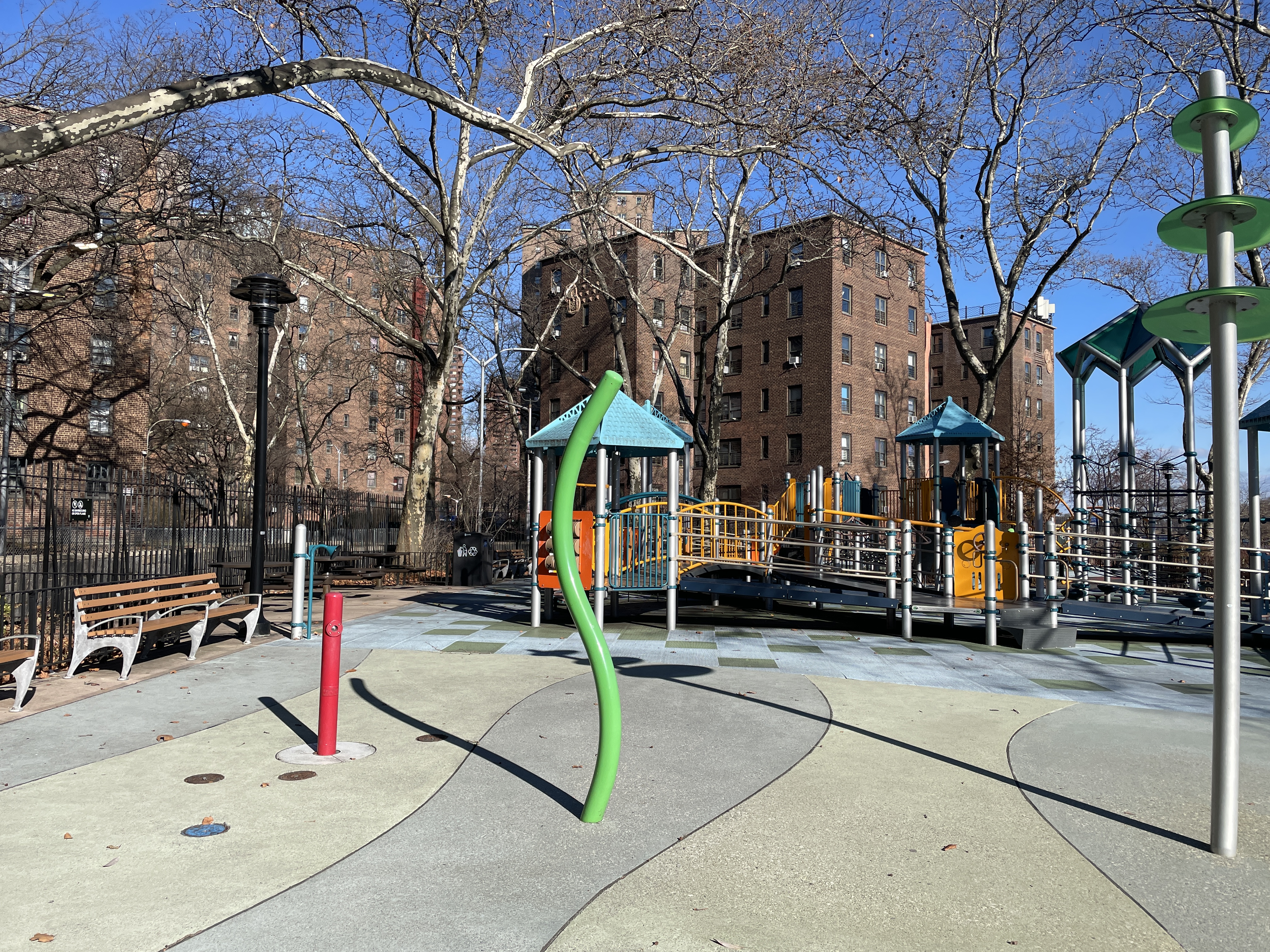
Playground 103 in December 2025

Located on a superblock formed by the elimination of two streets, it was the first housing project to be coordinated with the design of the East River Drive. The diagonal arrangement of the buildings on the site was selected as a result of a requirement to provide a 46,000-square-foot (4,300 m^{2}) park to be turned over to the city with room to include an approach to a proposed footbridge to Wards Island. The East River Houses was the first public housing project in New York City to include high-rise towers and set the precedent for the design of subsequent NYCHA housing complexes. It was also the first multiracial housing project in New York City, with the effort for desegregation led by Marcantonio.

Construction of the playground adjacent to the site began in December 1941 by the Works Progress Administration and was completed in November 1942; it was later renamed "Playground 103" in 1998. The Wards Island Bridge opened adjacent to the site in 1951, which provided pedestrian access to additional recreational facilities located on Wards Island. The access provided by the footbridge later became a concern to residents of the East River Houses as patients from the Manhattan Psychiatric Center walked across the bridge from Wards Island and passed through the housing complex.

=== 21st century ===
A $6.5 million renovation of Playground 103 was completed in 2019.

After flooding from Hurricane Sandy damaged the East River Houses, funding was provided by FEMA to repair and restore eight of the buildings; this work included the installation of rooftop back-up power generators, the replacement of sump pumps and the removal of hazardous materials and was completed in 2023. (Note: Buildings II and VII were excluded.)

In 2023, the intersection of 1st Avenue and 105th Street at the northwest corner of the complex was renamed after DJ Kay Slay, who was raised in the East River Houses.

== See also ==
- New York City Housing Authority
