= Wards Island Bridge =

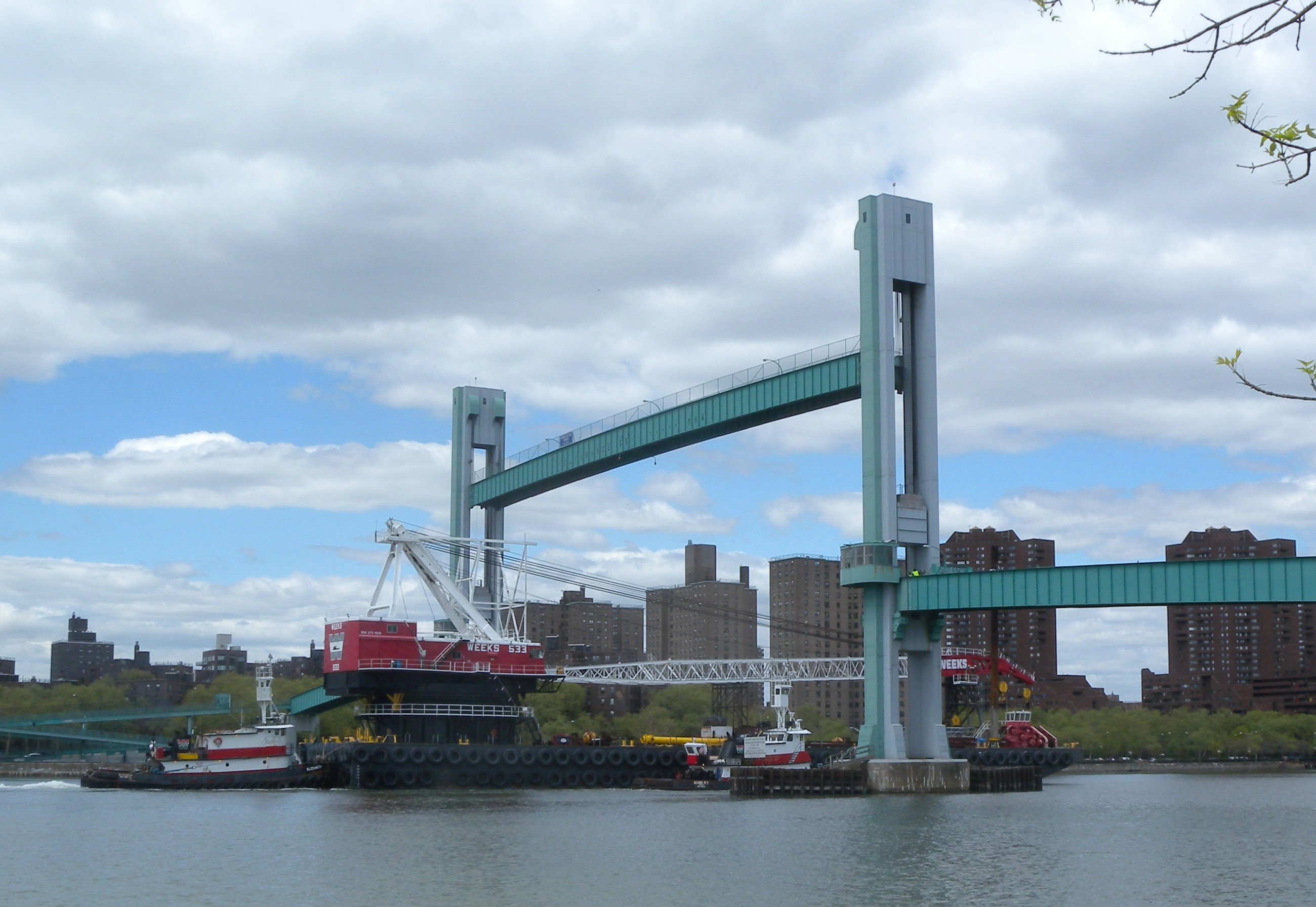
- Open to allow Weeks 533 to pass underneath, 2010
- Coordinates: 40.786293°N 73.937409°W
- Carries: Pedestrians
- Crosses: Harlem River
- Locale: Manhattan Island and Wards Island, New York
- Maintained by: New York City Department of Transportation

Characteristics
- Design: Vertical lift bridge
- Total length: 1,247 feet (380 m)
- Width: 12 feet (3.7 m)
- Longest span: 312 feet (95 m)

History
- Opened: May 18, 1951
- Rebuilt: 2010–2012

Location
- Interactive map of Wards Island Bridge

The Wards Island Bridge, also known as the 103rd Street Footbridge, is a bridge crossing the Harlem River between Manhattan Island and Wards Island in the Manhattan borough of New York City that does not allow vehicular traffic. The vertical lift bridge has a total of twelve spans consisting of steel towers and girders. It carries only pedestrian and bicycle traffic.

On the Manhattan side of the river, the bridge is located at East 103rd Street, between exits 14 and 15 of the FDR Drive. The bridge is accessible from the East River Greenway and a pedestrian overpass across the FDR Drive to the East River Houses apartment complex in East Harlem. The bridge connects to the southwestern corner of Wards Island and provides access to the many playing fields and scenic waterfront of Randall's Island and Wards Island Parks.

Wards Island Bridge is open to pedestrians and cyclists 24 hours a day, year-round. Prior to a 2010–2012 renovation, the bridge had only been available for use from April through October during the daytime.

== History ==
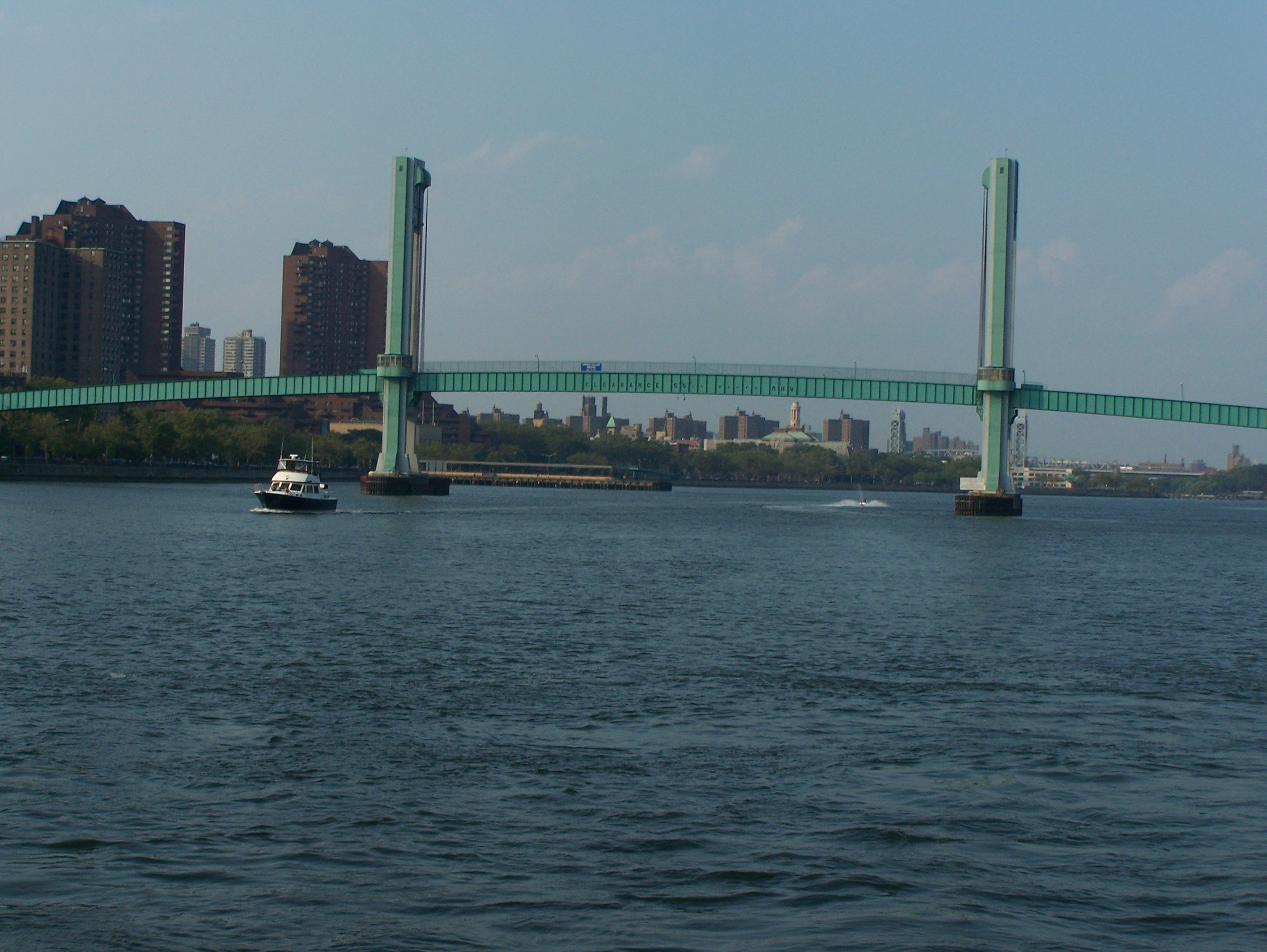
Wards Island Bridge with the lift lowered to allow pedestrian crossing, 2006

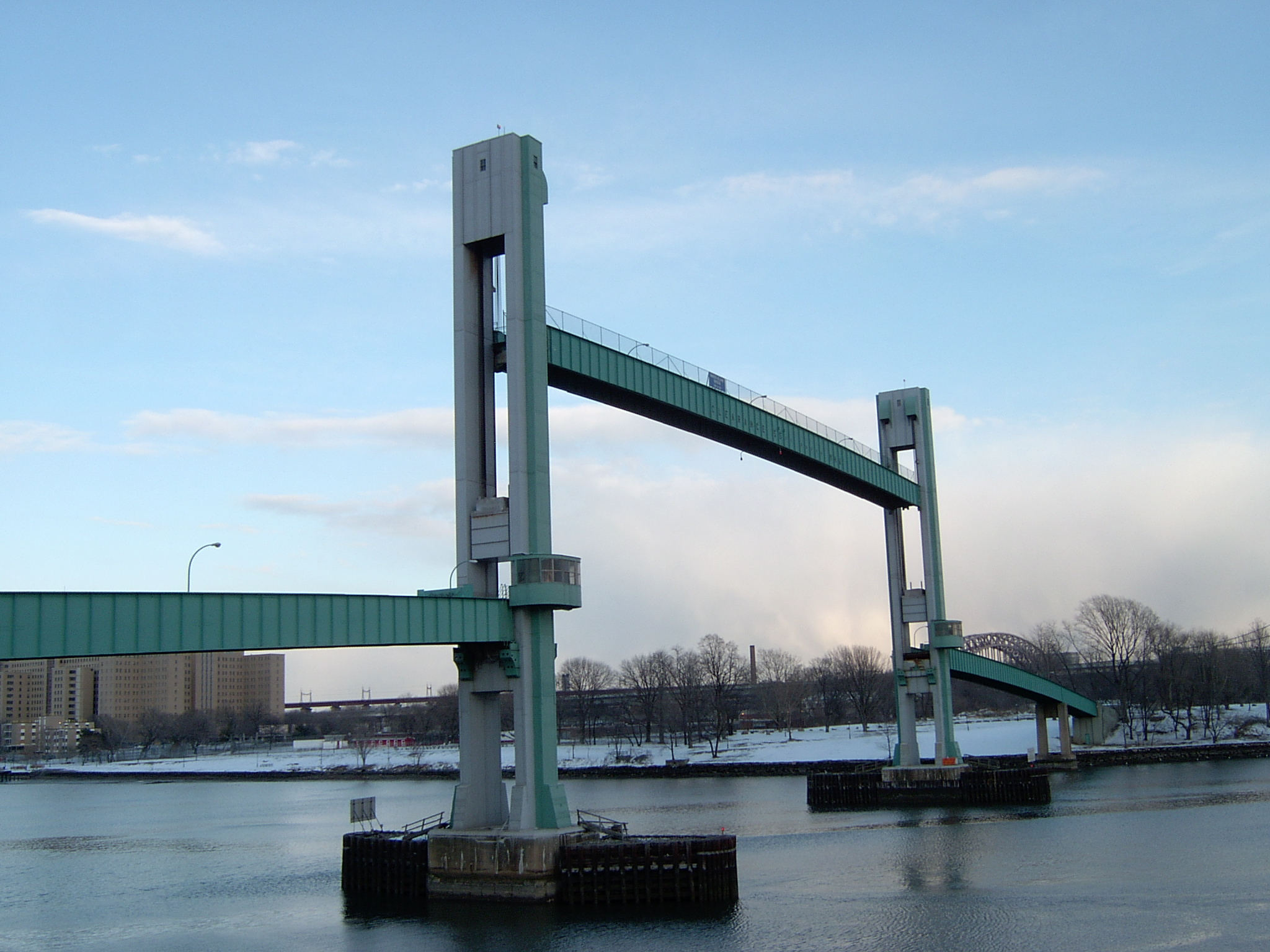
Wards Island Bridge, from Manhattan-side ramp, with the lift raised, 2007

Wards Island Bridge, Shared Use Sign, bicyclists to yield to pedestrians

The first known bridge to Wards Island was a wooden drawbridge between East 114th Street in Manhattan to the northwest corner of the island. The bridge was built in 1807 to serve a cotton business run by Philip Milledolar and Bartholomew Ward and lasted until 1821, when it was destroyed by a storm.

Pedestrian access to Randalls and Wards Islands was established with the opening of the Triborough Bridge by the Triborough Bridge and Tunnel Authority in 1936. Although plans to construct a separate pedestrian bridge to provide Manhattan residents better access to the new Wards Island Park were developed by Robert Moses in 1937, construction of the bridge did not begin until 1949. The design of the East River Houses in Manhattan, which were constructed from 1940 to 1941, included a requirement to provide room for an approach to the proposed footbridge. Designed by Othmar Hermann Ammann and built by the U.S. Army Corps of Engineers, the footbridge was originally known as the Harlem River Pedestrian Bridge.

The Wards Island Bridge opened to pedestrians on May 18, 1951 and was completed at a cost of $2.1 million. The bridge was later opened to bicycles in 1967. Although the bridge was originally painted in a red, yellow, and blue color scheme, it was repainted in sapphire blue and emerald green in 1986.

Restricting access to the bridge during the overnight hours and winter months traces back to concerns from residents of the East River Houses in the 1980s and 1990s over patients from the Manhattan State Psychiatric Center who frequently crossed the bridge into Manhattan. Tenants believed that the patients were responsible for increased levels of crime in their neighborhood, although others were unhappy with the limited park access.

In 1999, the New York City Department of Transportation proposed that the bridge be converted to a fixed bridge status. However, this proposal was delayed due to the clearance necessary to float construction equipment up the Harlem River for reconstruction projects associated with the Third Avenue, Willis Avenue, and 145th Street Bridges.

The Wards Island Bridge underwent a $15 million reconstruction between 2010 and 2012, which included replacement of the walkway deck, steel superstructure, and electrical and mechanical control systems. It reopened in June 2012, with the overhaul project costing $16.8 million.
