= Sunshine School (San Francisco) =

1937 school building in San Francisco, California, US

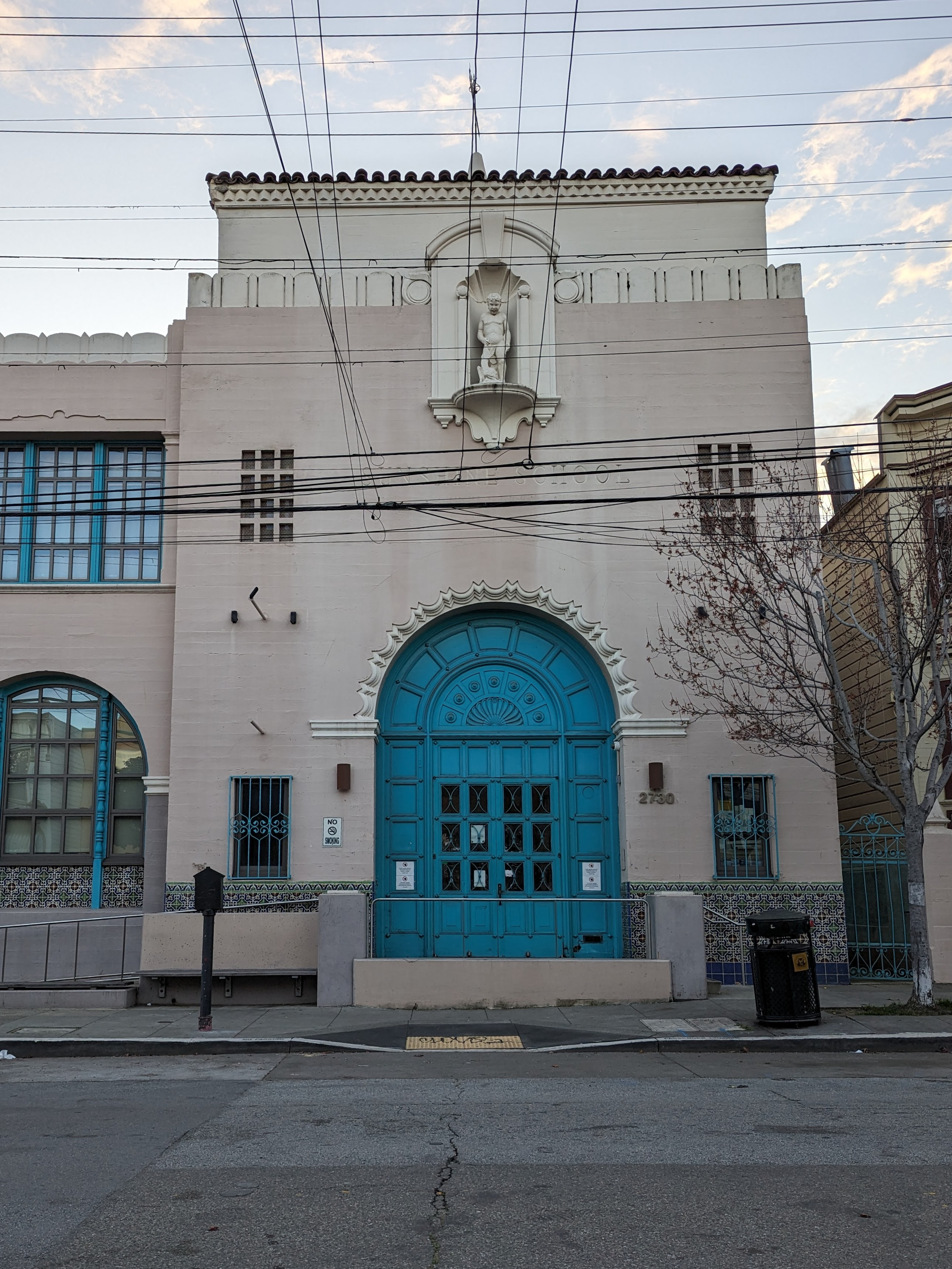

- Location within San Francisco County
- 37.750444°N 122.409222°W
- Location: 2728 Bryant Street, San Francisco, California, U.S.

History
- Built: 1937; 89 years ago

Site notes
- Architect(s): Albert Schroepfer, Charles F. Strothoff, Martin J. Rist, O'Brien-Smith
- Architectural styles: Spanish colonial revival, Art Deco, Moorish revival
- Governing body: City and County of San Francisco

San Francisco Designated Landmark
- Designated: March 15, 2019
- Reference no.: 286

Sunshine School is a historic 1937 school building and former school in the Mission District neighborhood in San Francisco, California, U.S.. It was first built as a private school for students with physical disabilities; and it later became a continuation high school. It also went by the names Sunshine Orthopedic School, Sunshine High School, and as Hilltop High School.

The building has been listed by the city as a San Francisco Designated Landmark since March 15, 2019. It now contains the San Francisco Unified School District's Cal-SAFE program, the Hilltop School, and various community agencies.

== History ==
The Sunshine School was founded by the Rotary Club of San Francisco, and was part of their International Society for Crippled Children (formerly the National Society for Crippled Children) program. During the 1926 Rotary Club District Conference in San Diego, California, the California Society for Crippled Children was formed and the San Francisco Rotary Club led the efforts to build a school (found prior to the 1937 building). Through the new society, the California Crippled Children Act was passed in the California state legislature on May 17, 1927, established to provide services to children with physical disabilities.

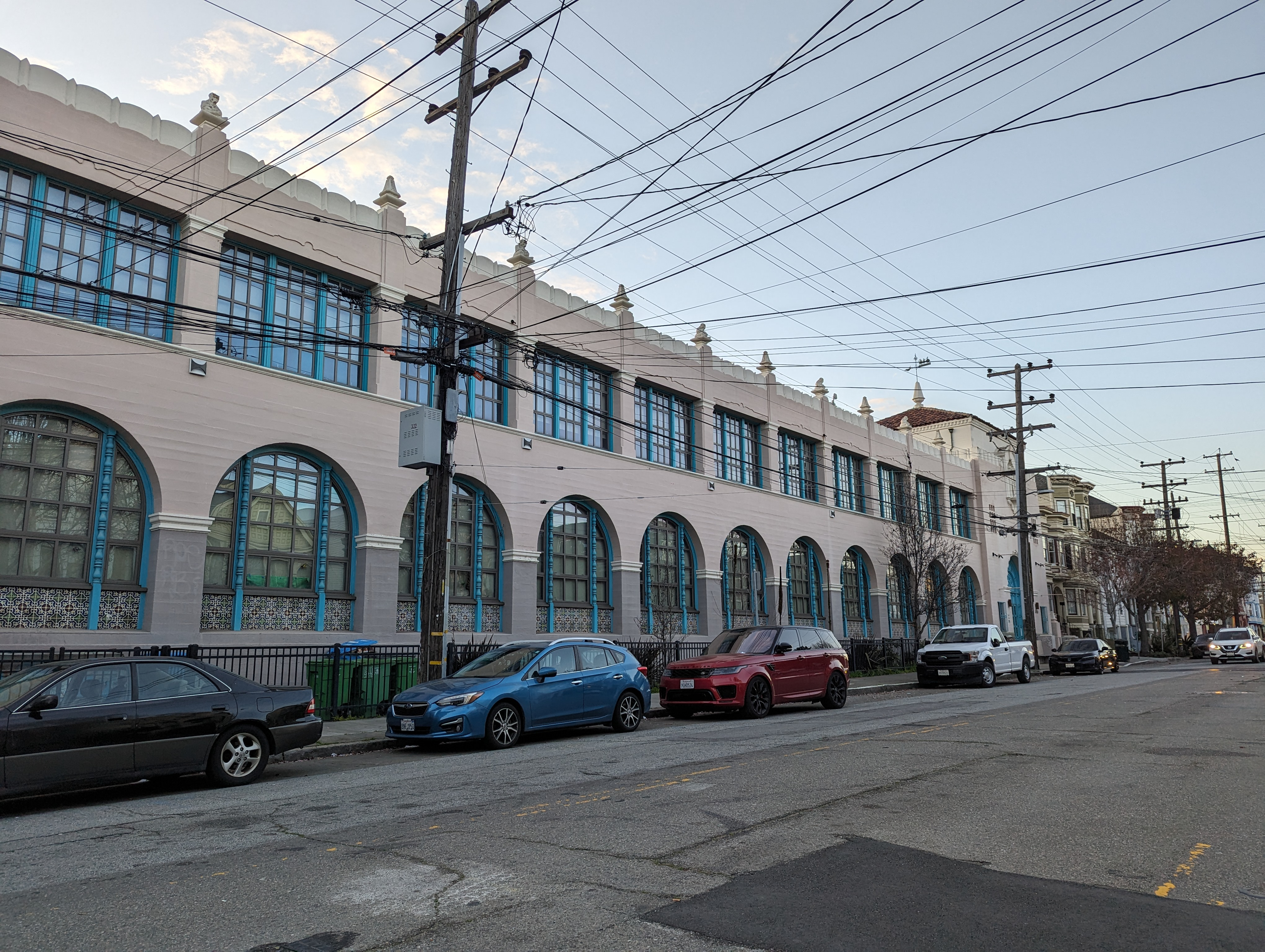
Exterior of the Sunshine School building (2024)

The San Francisco School Department took over the Sunshine School, some three years later. The Sunshine School building was built between 1935 and 1937, by the Public Works Administration (PWA), in a Spanish colonial revival architecture style with details from Moorish revival and Art Deco architecture. The building exterior features decorative tiles. The school was designed to serve two populations; students with physical disabilities occupied the first floor level with a therapeutic swimming pool and gymnasium, and students with illnesses (both chronic and acute) occupied the second floor with open‐air rooms.

The Sunshine School closed in the 1970s, during a time when disabled students were integrated in to public schools.

== See also ==
- California Children's Services (CCS)
- List of San Francisco Designated Landmarks
- List of institutions providing special education facilities
- Rehabilitation Act of 1973
