= Population: 2 =

Population: 2 is a 2012 American film directed by Gil Luna. The film was made entirely in Oregon with an all-Oregon cast and crew. It is recognized as having utilized several historic sites, one of which, the Fairview Training Center, no longer exists in its full form, having been demolished between 2011 and 2016.

== Premise ==
Set against the backdrop of a post-apocalyptic Earth, Population 2 is about Lilith who wanders the remains of civilization every day, scavenging what she can from the deserted refuse of what was once a bustling city.

== Cast ==
- Jon Ashley Hall as Simon Prime
- Shelly Lipkin as Vincent Velo
- Sibyl Lazzara as Kennedy
- Jacqueline Gault as Doctor Bannon
- Meredith Adelaide as Face of Pandora (as Meredith Williams)
