= Fairview Training Center =

- State of Oregon
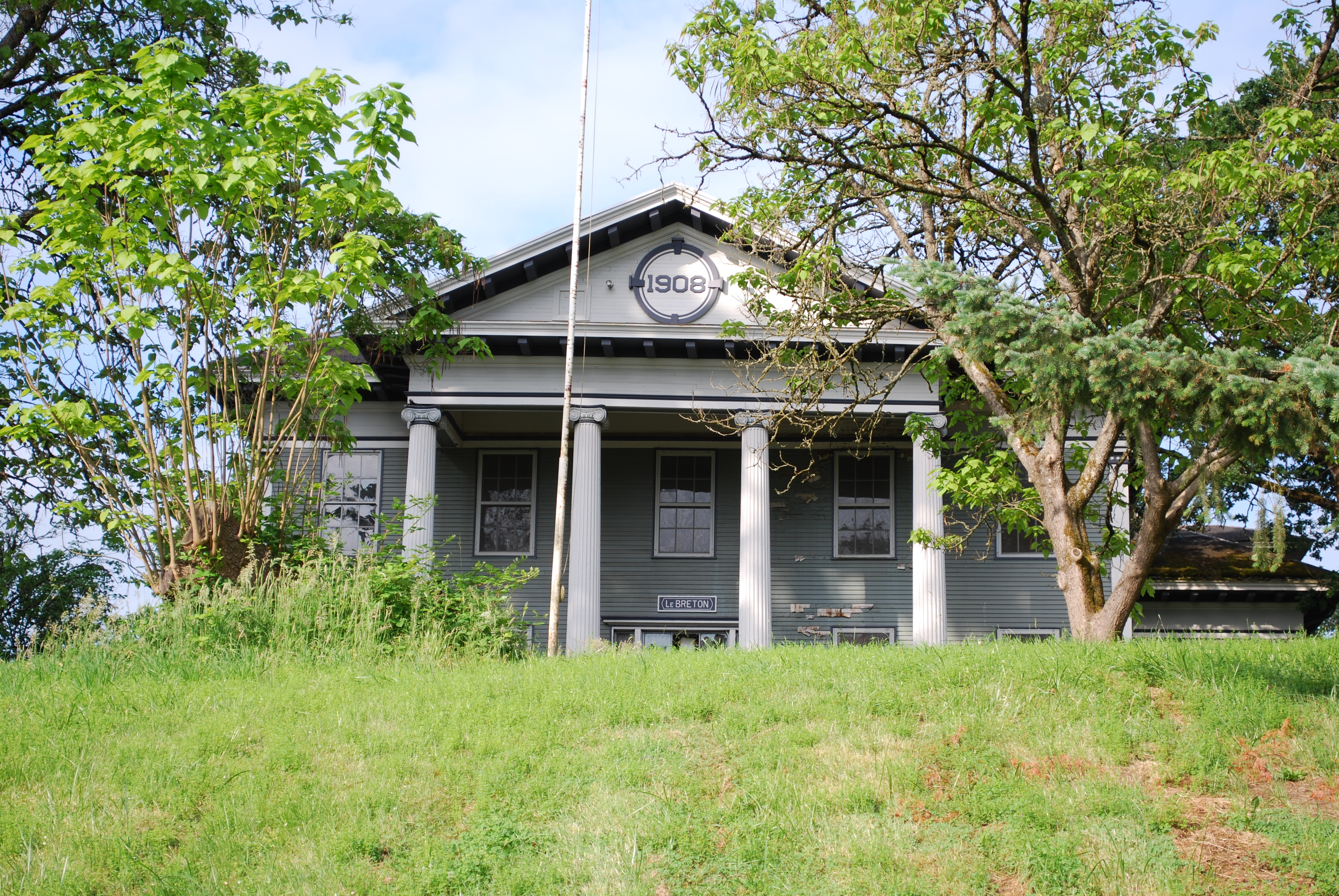
- LeBreton Cottage at Fairview, built in 1908. Photographed in 2009.

Geography
- Location: Salem, Oregon, United States
- Coordinates: 44.8978981°N 123.0137063°W

Organization
- Care system: Public
- Type: Psychiatric hospital

History
- Founded: 1907
- Closed: March 01, 2000

Links
- Lists: Hospitals in Oregon
- Other links: Oregon State Hospital

The Fairview Training Center was a state-run facility for people with developmental disabilities in Salem, Oregon, United States. Fairview was established in 1907 as the State Institution for the Feeble-Minded. The hospital opened on December 1, 1908, with 39 patients transferred from the Oregon State Hospital for the Insane. Before its closure in 2000, Fairview was administered by the Oregon Department of Human Services (DHS). DHS continued to operate the Eastern Oregon State Hospital in Pendleton until October 31, 2009.

== History ==
=== Early history ===
In 1907, the Oregon State Institution for the Feeble-Minded was created by the Oregon State Legislature. It was established as a quasi-educational institution charged with educating the "feeble-minded" (today known as people with intellectual disability and various other developmental and learning disabilities) and caring for the "idiotic and epileptic." The facility was overseen by a board of trustees consisting of the Governor, Secretary of State and State Treasurer. Construction had progressed enough by 1908 that the first patients were transferred from the Oregon State Insane Asylum (now the Oregon State Hospital). They resided on a 670-acre (270 ha) compound consisting of an administration building (LeBreton Cottage), a dormitory, a laundry and boiler house. By 1913, two more cottages were constructed and the board of trustees was replaced by the Oregon State Board of Control.

In 1917, a commitment law was passed that was to standardize admissions to the institution by insuring that valuable space was used for the "feeble-minded" and not for the "insane". It also imposed an age limit on admissions to people five years of age and older. The age limit was removed in 1921.

The institution had a working farm that provided both food and training for its residents. By 1920, most of the land to be used for farming had been cleared. 400 acres (160 ha) were planted in crops and 45 acres (18 ha) in orchards. The farm also raised hogs, chickens, and dairy and beef cattle.

In 1923, the legislature established the Oregon Board of Eugenics, and Fairview's superintendent served as an ex-officio board member. The eugenics legislation provided for the "sterilization of all feeble-minded, insane, epileptics, habitual criminals, moral degenerates, and sexual perverts who are a menace to society." Sterilizations required either the person's consent or a court order. By 1929, 300 residents had been sterilized.

Two types of parole for residents were established in 1931: home parole and industrial parole. Requirements for parole included a surety bond filed by the parolee's guardian or overseer, who had to have a net worth of at least $1000 and have lived in the state for at least six months, the parolee had to be sterilized, and the home or workplace had to be inspected. Two-thirds of residents who had been sterilized were paroled, which freed up beds for new patients.

In 1933 the facility was renamed Oregon Fairview Home.

Changes in care and additions to the facility continued through the 1940s-1960s, and improvements were made to the medical care and nutrition of the residents.

In 1965, Oregon Fairview Home was renamed Fairview Hospital and Training Center.

In the late 1960s, the orchard, raising of beef, and general farm activities were eliminated. The raising of hogs was eliminated in 1975 and poultry processing ended in 1977. These activities had formerly provided all the ham, bacon, sausage, eggs, broiler chickens, and pork chops used by Fairview.

In 1969, the Board of Control was dissolved and the Mental Health Division placed under the newly created Executive Department of the state government.

In 1979, the facility changed its name from Fairview Hospital and Training Center to Fairview Training Center.

=== Modern history ===
Fairview was closed on March 1, 2000.

A group known as Sustainable Fairview Associates purchased 275 acres (111 ha) of the former Fairview grounds in 2002. The land included several historic buildings.

In 2004, Sustainable Fairview Associates sold 32 acres (13 ha) of their holdings to Sustainable Development Inc. for building Pringle Creek Community, a sustainable housing development.

Pierce Cottage, one of several buildings remaining on the former Fairview site, was gutted by a fire of suspicious origin in January 2010. The building was one of 50 at the site previously slated for demolition and recycling. Two men were charged with arson in connection with the fire the next month. All remaining cottages were demolished in 2016.

== Superintendents ==
- H.E. Bickers 1908-1912
- Frank E. Smith, M.D. 1913-1914
- J.H. Thompson, M.D. 1914-1915
- J.N. Smith, M.D. 1915-1929
- R.D. Byrd 1930-1938
- Horace G. Miller M.D. 1939-1944
- Ray M. Waltz, M.D. 1944-1946
- Irvin B. Hill, M.D. 1946-1959
- Jim Pomeroy, M.D. 1960-1970
- Larry W. Talkington, Ph.D. 1970-1976
- Jerry E. McGee, Ed.D. 1977-1987
- Linda K. Gustafson, Ph.D. 1989-1991
- Rosemary C. Hennessy 1991-1995
- Charles Farnham 1995-1997
- Jon E. Cooper M.B.A. 1997-2000

== Cottages ==
The cottages on the grounds housed both staff and patients. Some of the structures were named after Oregon governors, including:

- Benson Cottage - Frank W. Benson
- Chamberlain Cottage - George Earle Chamberlain
- Lane Cottage - Joseph Lane
- Martin Cottage - Charles Martin
- Meier Cottage - Julius Meier
- Pierce Cottage - Walter M. Pierce (image) Destroyed by fire January 27, 2010
- Smith Cottage - Elmo Smith
- Snell Cottage - Earl Snell
- Withycombe Cottage - James Withycombe

== Fairview in the media ==
- Where's Molly? is a 2007 documentary about Molly Daly who was institutionalized at the Fairview Hospital and Training Center in the 1950s
- Population: 2 is a post-apocalyptic film that features Fairview heavily as a location and contains the last footage of the center taken before its dismantling began in 2011
- In the Shadow of Fairview - A documentary made by OPB.
- The case of Janie Landers, a young woman who disappeared from Fairview, was featured on the show Cold Case Files.

== See also ==
- List of institutions providing special education facilities
