= Randalls and Wards Islands =

Conjoined islands in New York City

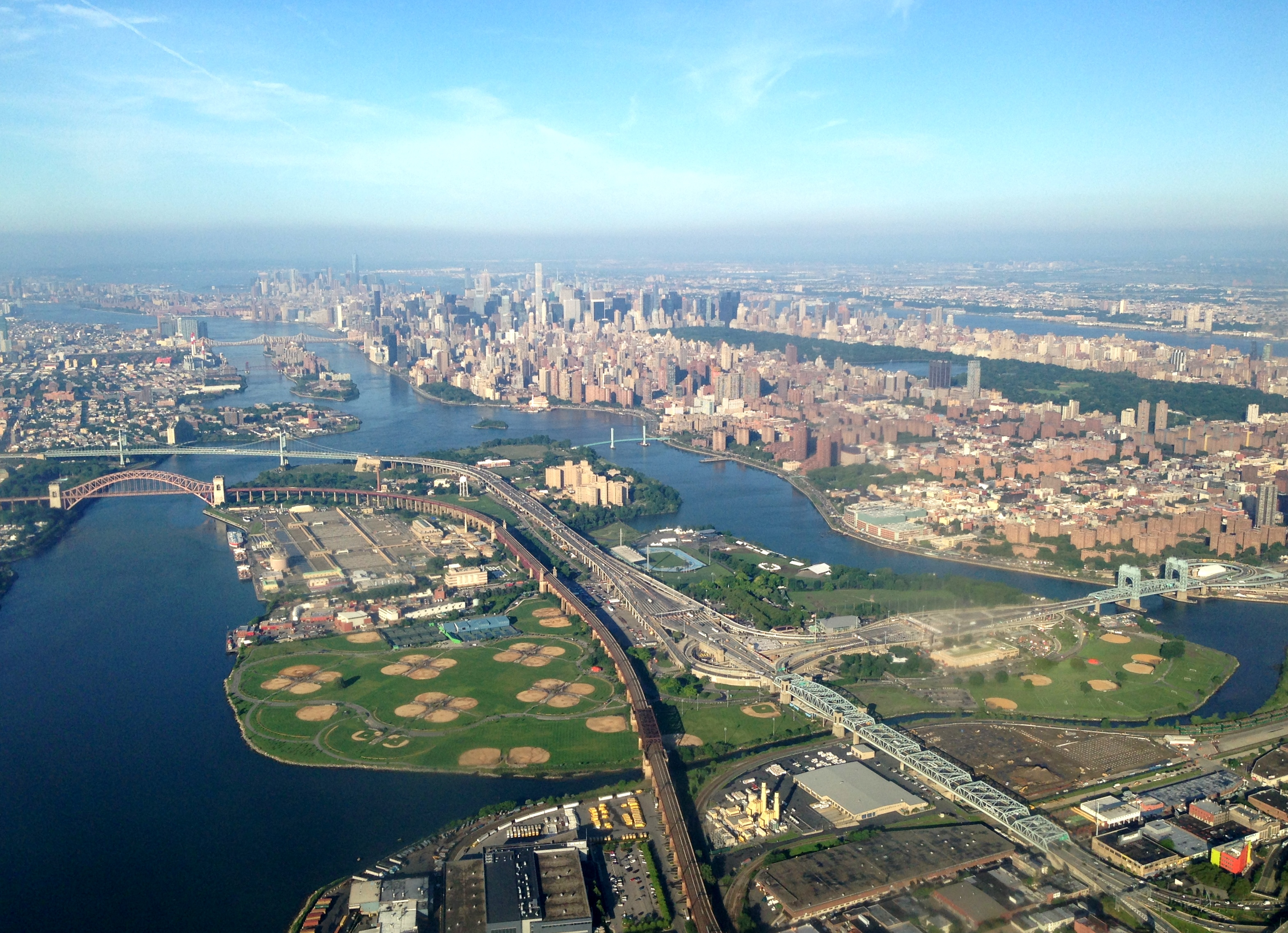
- Looking southwest; Randalls Island is in the foreground and Wards Island is behind it. Roosevelt Island, Manhattan (R), and Queens (L) can be seen in the background.

- Location within New York City Location within New York Location within the United States

Geography
- Location: East River, Manhattan, New York, U.S.
- Coordinates: 40°47′15″N 73°55′31″W
- Area: 2.09 km^{2} (0.81 sq mi)

Administration
- United States
- State: New York
- City: New York City
- Borough: Manhattan

Demographics
- Population: 1,648 (2010)
- Pop. density: 788.5/km^{2} (2042.2/sq mi)

Randalls Island (sometimes called Randall's Island) and Wards Island are conjoined islands, collectively called Randalls and Wards Island, in New York City. Part of the borough of Manhattan, it is separated from Manhattan Island by the Harlem River, from Queens by the East River and Hell Gate, and from the Bronx by the Bronx Kill. A channel named Little Hell Gate separated Randalls Island to the north from Wards Island to the south; the channel was filled by the early 1960s. A third, smaller island, Sunken Meadow Island, was located east of Randalls Island and was connected to it in 1955.

The Lenape Native Americans, who lived in the New York City area before European colonization, did not inhabit the islands. Between the 1630s and the 1770s, the islands had various European residents; the islands had the same owners in the 17th century, but ownership was split during the 18th century. Randalls and Wards Islands became known for their respective early-19th-century owners, Jonathan Randel and the Ward brothers. The city government took over both islands in the mid-19th century and developed numerous hospitals, asylums, and cemeteries there. Most of the existing buildings were demolished starting in the 1930s, when the Triborough (now Robert F. Kennedy) Bridge, two parks, and a wastewater treatment plant were developed there. The islands have since been connected with each other, and various recreational facilities and institutions have been developed on both islands in the late 20th and the 21st centuries.

Most of Randalls and Wards Island is parkland with athletic fields, a driving range, greenways, playgrounds, picnic grounds, and the Icahn Stadium track-and-field facility. The island is home to several public facilities, including a psychiatric hospital, an addiction treatment facility, shelters, a fire training academy, police station, and a wastewater treatment plant. The modern-day island is crossed by the Robert F. Kennedy and Hell Gate bridges.

== Geography ==
What is now Randalls and Wards Island was originally composed of Randalls Island to the north, Wards Island to the south, and Sunken Meadow just southeast of Randalls Island. A small creek, Little Hell Gate, ran between the islands. The current Randalls and Wards Island came about when Little Hell Gate was partially infilled. The combined island is part of the New York City borough of Manhattan; this dates to an 1829 statute that designated the islands as being within Manhattan's eastern boundary. Randalls and Wards Island has an area of about 530 acres (210 ha). The island is surrounded by Bronx Kill to the north, separating it from the Bronx; Harlem River to the west, separating it from Manhattan Island; and the Hell Gate channel of the East River to the south and east, separating it from Queens. The island had a population of 1,648 in 2010.

A small island called Mill Rock exists south of Wards Island, while further south is Roosevelt Island. Prior to the removal of Hell Gate rocks in the mid-19th century, there were other large rock outcroppings in the East River near Wards Island.

=== Islands ===
==== Randalls Island ====
Before the islands were combined, Randalls Island had an area of about 240 acres (97 ha). Randalls Island had some granite outcroppings and marshland. The southern part of the island was composed of low hills, while the northern two-thirds were higher and flatter. There were two isolated ponds on the northern part of the island. There was a ridge across the island's northern section, which hosted farms and fruit orchards in the 19th century. Surrounding Randalls Island was a narrow strip of marshland, and there were larger marshes to the north and southeast, which drained into the East River. The north and southeast shores also had shellfish beds. The southern part of the island was leveled, and the shoreline rebuilt, in the mid-19th century, though some meadows and swamps remained until the 1930s.

==== Sunken Meadow Island ====
To the east of Randalls Island was Sunken Meadow Island, which covered about 20 acres (8.1 ha). Ownership of Sunken Meadow Island had been disputed during the early 20th century, and city officials had considered that island to be part of Randalls Island. Infilling took place beginning in the mid-1950s. The Sunken Meadow section of Randalls Island Park comprises 85 acres (34 ha) and contains ball fields. Also east of Randalls Island was an even smaller island called the Hammock, which was subsumed through filling operations.

==== Wards Island ====
Originally, Wards Island had an area of about 145 acres (59 ha). Like Randalls Island to the north, Wards Island had marshlands on its western and northern shores and shellfish beds on the southeastern part of the island. A 1968 guidebook described grasses as being present across the island. The island is surrounded by piles of riprap or rocks.

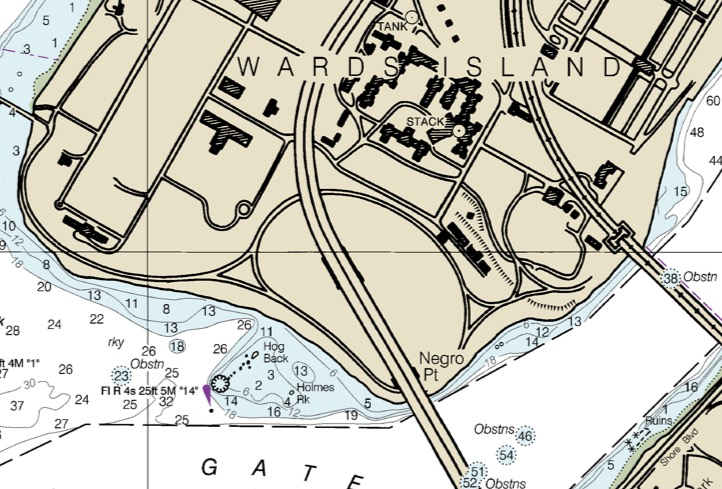
Detail from NOAA Chart 12339 showing Negro Point

By the 19th century, the southern end of Wards Island was known as Negro Point; the Negro Point name became official in 1984. A ledge extended about 200 feet (61 m) to its southeast. The United States Geological Survey and the National Oceanic and Atmospheric Administration used the Negro Point name. Parks commissioner Henry Stern renamed Negro Point in 2001 upon learning of the name, which he thought was offensive. He changed the name to "Scylla Point" because it faced Charybdis Playground in Astoria Park, on the opposite shore of Hell Gate; these were named after the mythological monsters of Scylla and Charybdis on the Strait of Messina.

There were other outcroppings around Wards Island. A 1918 guidebook listed two outcroppings known as Holmes Rock and Hogs Back, both of which were west of Scylla Point and above the waterline. The western outcropping extended 400 feet (120 m) to the southwest, while the eastern outcropping extended 300 feet (91 m) to the southwest. These outcroppings are made of Manhattan schist. Ships traveling from the Belgian city of Antwerp also dumped slag onto the shores of the island.

=== Little Hell Gate ===
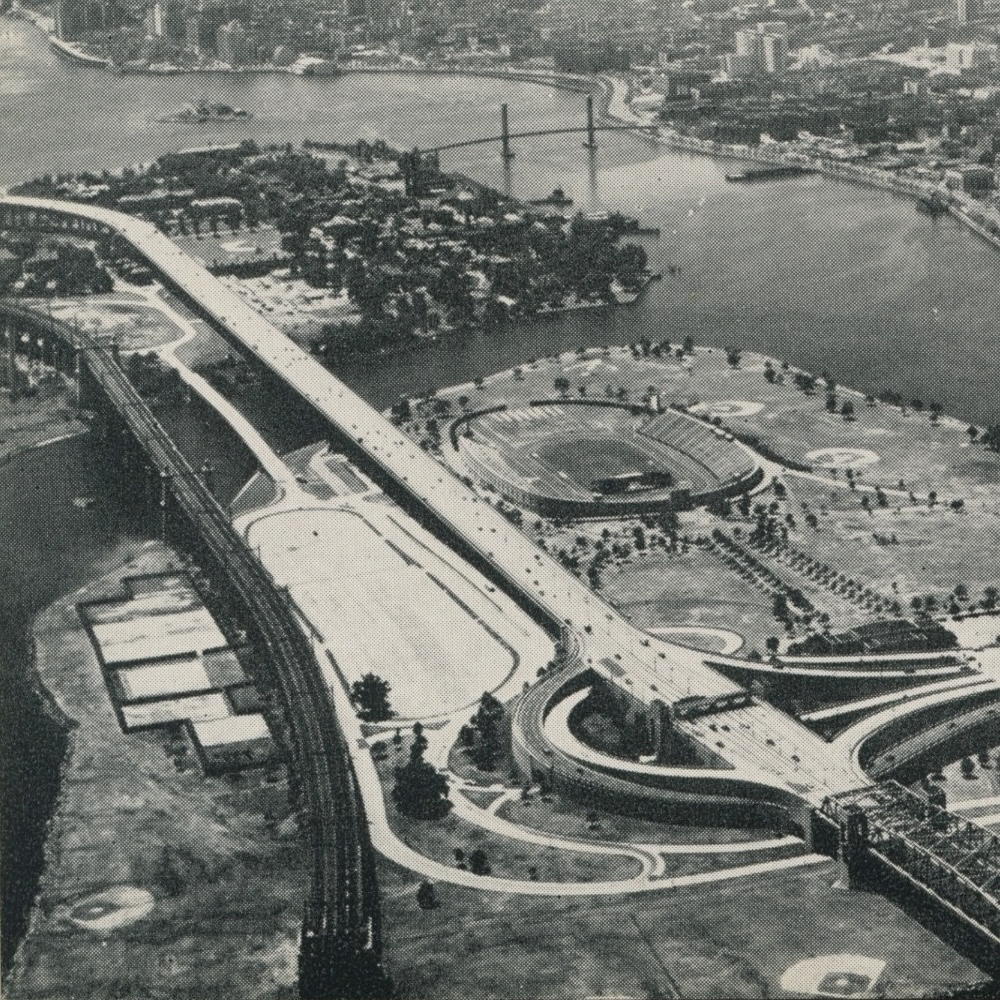
Little Hell Gate before being filled in

Little Hell Gate was originally a natural waterway separating Randalls Island and Wards Island. The east end of the waterway opened into the Hell Gate passage of the East River, opposite Astoria, Queens. The west end met the Harlem River across from East 116th Street, Manhattan. At the Hell Gate Bridge, the waterway was over 1000 feet (300 m) wide with swift currents.

The opening of the Triborough Bridge spurred the conversion of both islands to parkland. Soon thereafter, the city began filling in most of the passage between the two islands, in order to expand and connect the two parks. The inlet was filled in by the 1960s. What is now called "Little Hell Gate Inlet" is the western end of what used to be Little Hell Gate; however, few traces of the eastern end of Little Hell Gate still remain: an indentation in the shoreline on the East River side indicates the former east entrance to that waterway. Today, parkland and part of the New York City Fire Department Academy occupy that area.

== History ==
=== Lenape use ===
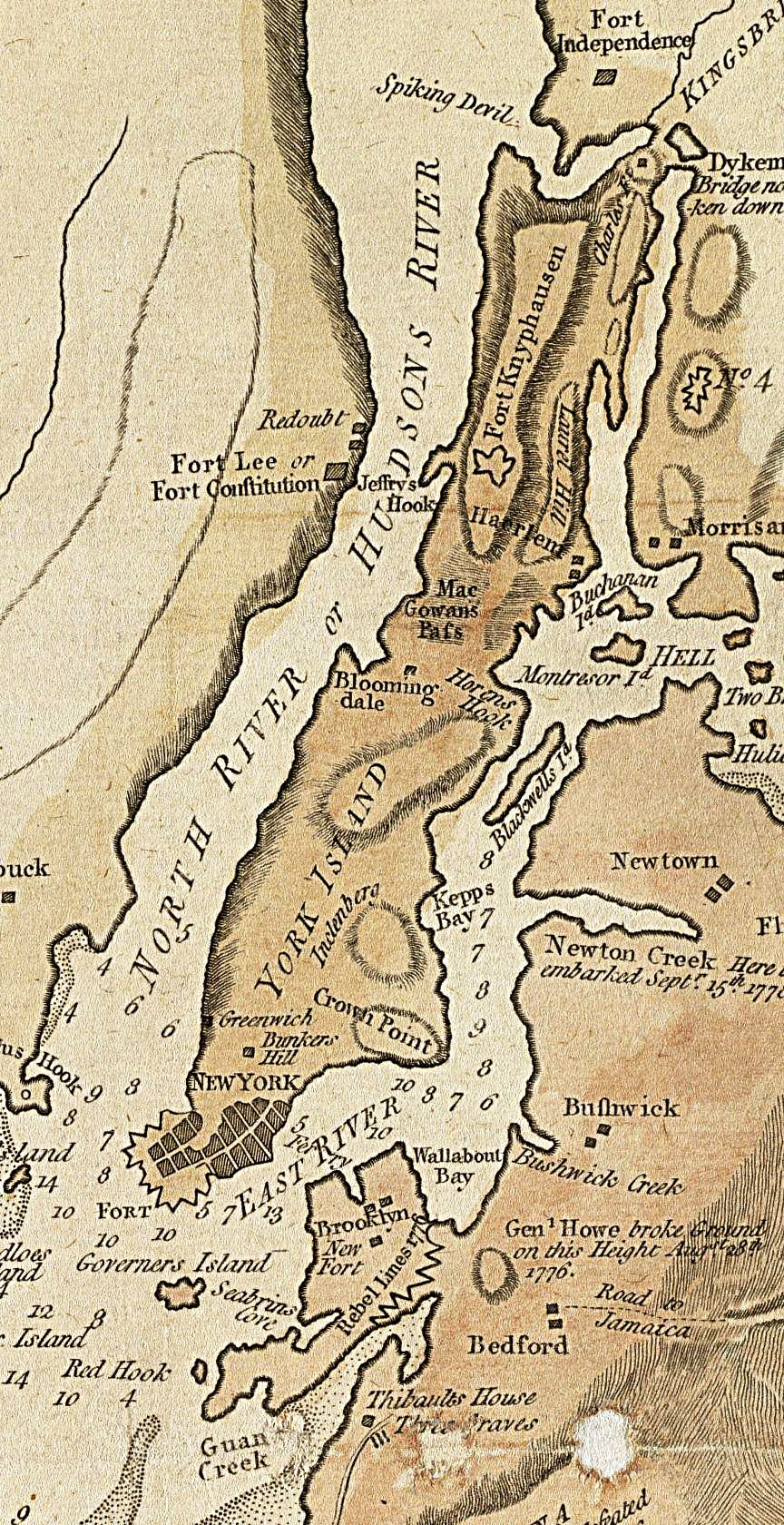
A 1781 British map of Manhattan. Montresor's (Randalls) and Buchanan's (Wards) Islands can be seen on the right, flanking Hell Gate, although their names have been reversed, Montresor's being the northern of the two.

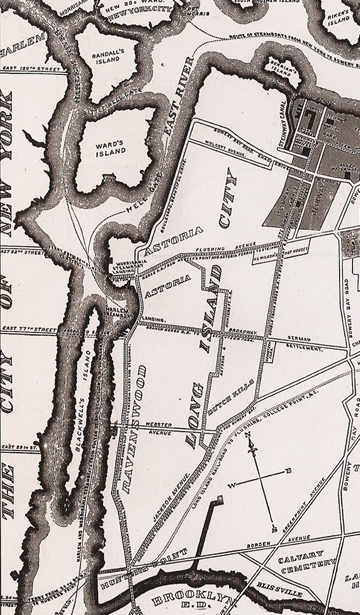
Detail of an 1896 map of Long Island City from the Greater Astoria Historical Society; Randalls and Wards Islands are at the top.

According to archaeological digs, the area around Randalls and Wards Islands was settled by Paleo-Indians up to 12,000 years ago. The Lenape, a Native American people indigenous to New York City, called Wards Island Tekenas or Tenkenas. The exact translation of the name is not known but has been interpreted as "forest", "wild land[s]", or "uninhabited place"; the name is derived from Tékene, the Munsee Delaware word for "the woods". Randalls Island was called Minnehanonck or Minnahanouth. Neither Randalls nor Wards Islands are known to have had any Lenape settlements. Just west of Randalls Island was a village called Conykeekst ("little narrow tract") on Manhattan Island, while to the north of Randalls Island was the village of Ranachqua in the Bronx. There was another settlement, Rechewanis, on Manhattan Island southwest of the two islands as late as 1669.

At the time of European contact in the early 17th century, there were 900 Wecquaesgeek Lenape living in what is now Upper Manhattan, the Bronx, and lower Westchester County. The islands became part of the Dutch colony of New Netherland, and Dutch colonists ultimately forced the Wecquaesgeek off Manhattan by the late 17th century.

=== 17th through early 19th centuries ===
Between the 1630s and the 1770s, the islands had various European residents. At the time, the islands were several miles from the boundaries of New York City, which then occupied modern-day Lower Manhattan. The islands had the same owners in the 17th century, but ownership was split during the 18th century.

==== Early colonial use ====
Wouter Van Twiller, the Director General of New Netherland, obtained the island from two Lenape chiefs named Numers and Seyseys on July 16, 1637. Van Twiller only used the islands for raising livestock. Wards Island's first European name was Great Barent Island, while Randalls Island's first European name was Little Barent Island; both were named after a Danish cowherd named Barent Jansen Blom. A map from 1639 indicates that Van Twiller farmed Great Barent Island but left Little Barent Island unused.

The islands were both seized in April 1667, three years after the British takeover of New Netherland. The names of Great and Little Barent Islands were changed to Great and Little Barn (Note: The name "Barn" has also been transcribed as "Barnes".) after the British took over. Thomas Delavall, a customs collector and an early mayor of New York City, claimed ownership of both islands in January 1667 and formally took ownership in 1668. Delavall offered the islands as a public park for the nearby town of Harlem, but nothing came of this proposal. After Delavall's death in 1682, the islands were bequeathed to his son-in-law William Dervall. The islands became part of New York County (now Manhattan) in 1683, and they became part of New York City in 1691. Toward the end of the 17th century, stones from Little Barn Island were quarried for the construction of Trinity Church in Manhattan's Financial District.

==== Early and mid-18th century use ====
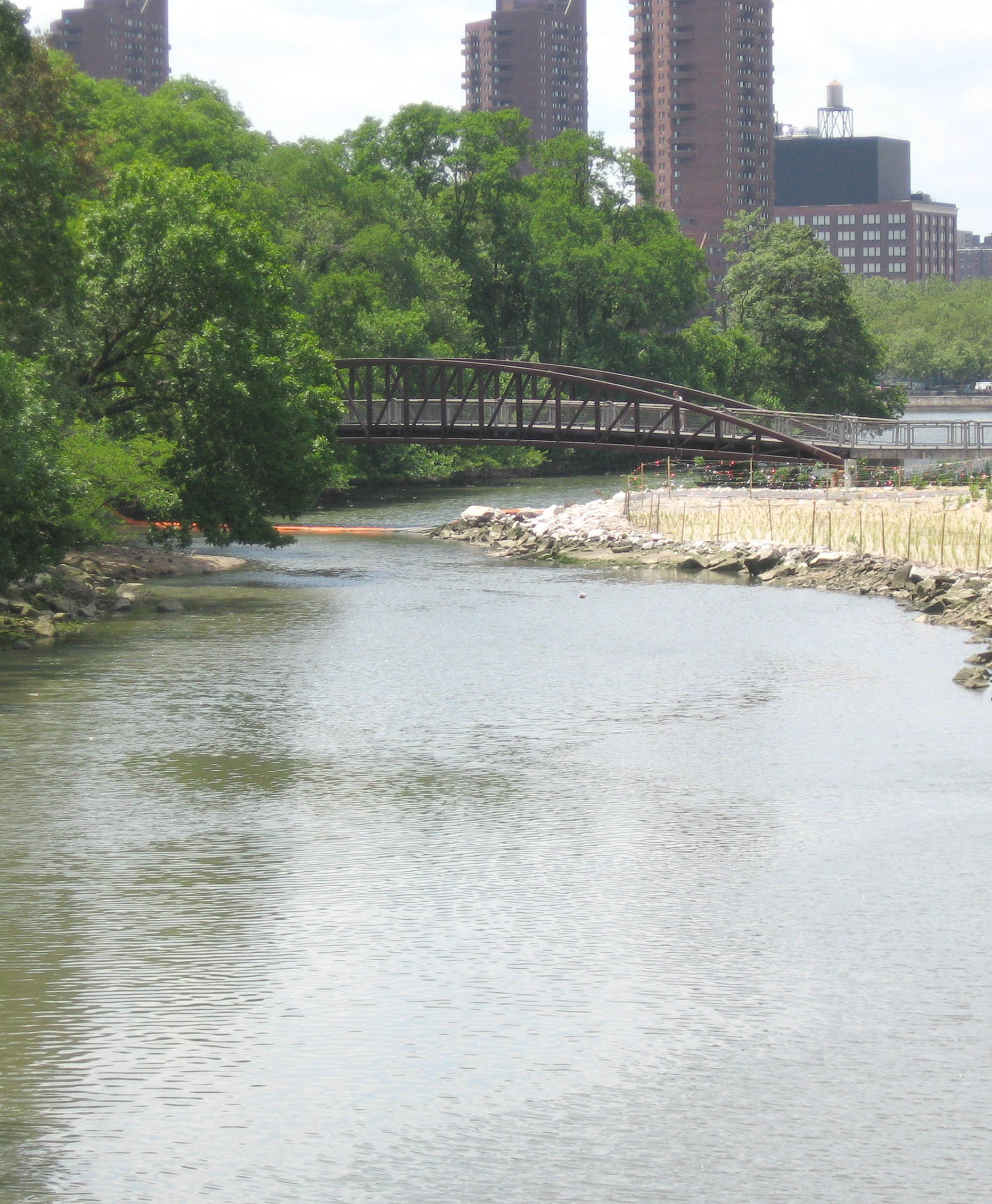
Looking west along Little Hell Gate Inlet, a remnant of the former Little Hell Gate strait between the two islands, in 2008

Great Barn (Wards) Island came under the ownership of Thomas Parcell in 1687; his family owned it until c. 1762, during which it was called Parcell's Island. At least four people, likely members of the Parcell family, were buried in a stone vault on the island. Wards Island was also known as Buchanan's Island. Thomas Bohanna bought 140 acres (57 ha) on the southern section Great Barn Island in 1767, and the island was briefly known for him. Bohanna's portion of Great Barn Island was then resold in 1772 to Benjamin Hildreth, while John William Pinfold obtained the remainder of the island at that time. By then, Great Barn Island included an orchard, farms, pastures, and several buildings.

Meanwhile, Little Barn (Randalls) Island had come under the ownership of Elias Pipon, Delavall's great grandson, by 1735. Pipon had emigrated from England in 1732 and was socially popular until he went bankrupt in 1739 and had to return to England. The island subsequently became known as Belle Isle (Note: Also spelled Bell) or Belle Island. The New York Times describes an "amiable English gentlemen of quiet tastes", George Talbot, as being the next occupant of Pipon's house. Talbot definitely occupied the island by 1747, and the isle gained the name Talbot's Island. He died on the island in 1765 and bequeathed it to the Society in Great Britain for Propagating the Gospel to Foreign Parts, which held onto the island for another seven years. Captain John Montresor, an engineer with the British army, purchased Randalls Island in 1772. He renamed it Montresor's Island and lived on it until the American Revolutionary War; he surveyed the New York Harbor area for the British prior to the war.

Starting in early 1776, the Continental Army used Montresor's Island to quarantine American soldiers who were infected with smallpox. Following the Continental Army's defeat in the Battle of Long Island, the British took over both islands and used them as an army base. The British launched amphibious attacks on Manhattan from Montresor's Island. John Montresor's wife Frances worked at a hospital on Montresor's Island, and troops on that island became friendly with American troops in the modern-day South Bronx. The Continental Army unsuccessfully tried to retake Montresor's Island on September 23, 1776, and 14 American troops were killed or injured. Montresor's house there was burned in 1777. Montresor wrote in his diary that American soldiers had burned down his house, while the Americans maintained that the British had set the house aflame while retreating from what they believed was an imminent attack. Maps from late 1777 indicate that there were no remaining structures on Montresor's Island's western shore. Montresor moved back to England afterward. (Note: Sources disagree over whether he moved to England in 1778 or 1783.)

==== Post-Revolutionary use ====
The New York City government confiscated the islands after the British occupation of New York ended in 1783. The city sold Montresor's Island to the merchant Samuel Ogden in 1784. In November 1784, Jonathan Randel (Note: His surname is variously spelled Randal or Randel. One source from 1962 spelled his name Jonathan Randall.) bought Montresor's Island for about $6,000. Randel reportedly sold enough produce to pay for the island within a decade. Maps from the early 19th century show that Randel developed at least three structures; an 1836 map depicts a tree-lined path leading from the Harlem River to Randell's main house.

William Lownds bought Great Barn Island's southern half from Benjamin Hildreth in 1785. He operated a quarry on that island and continued to maintain a farm there. Jasper Ward bought Lownds's land in 1806. His brother Bartholomew bought the remainder of Great Barn Island from John Molenaar, who in turn had acquired that land from Pinfold. The island was renamed for the Ward brothers, who unsuccessfully tried to create an agrarian community there, selling off parcels to various people. In addition, Bartholomew Ward and Philip Milledolar (Note: His surname is variously spelled Milledoer or Milledolar) built a drawbridge to what is now 114th Street on Manhattan Island, which was completed around 1807. A cotton factory was then built on the island by 1811, but it failed in part because of the economic effects of the War of 1812. The bridge lasted until 1821, when it was destroyed in a storm. The damaged bridge pilings remained in place for several decades, and Wards Island was mostly abandoned afterward.

=== Mid-19th century: development of institutions ===
Jonathan Randel's heirs sold Randalls Island to the city in 1835 for $50,000 (equivalent to $1.6 million in 2025) or $60,000 (equivalent to $1.9 million in 2025). Randel's name was misspelled in the ownership deed that was given to the city, and so the island became known as Randalls Island. The city government leased Wards Island in December 1847, initially erecting the State Emigrant Refuge and Hospital there before buying Wards Island outright. The city bought half of Wards Island during the early 1850s and acquired the remainder of the island through 1883.

In the mid-19th century, various social facilities were relocated from Manhattan Island to nearby smaller isles, including Randalls and Wards Islands. Randalls Island housed an almshouse (opened 1845), a children's hospital (opened 1848), the Idiot Asylum, and the New York House of Refuge reformatory. Maps from the 1850s show two hospital complexes on Randalls Island. Meanwhile, Wards Island was used by the State Emigrant Refuge and the New York City Asylum for the Insane. Both islands also had potter's fields, or cemeteries for destitute people.

==== Wards Island institutions ====
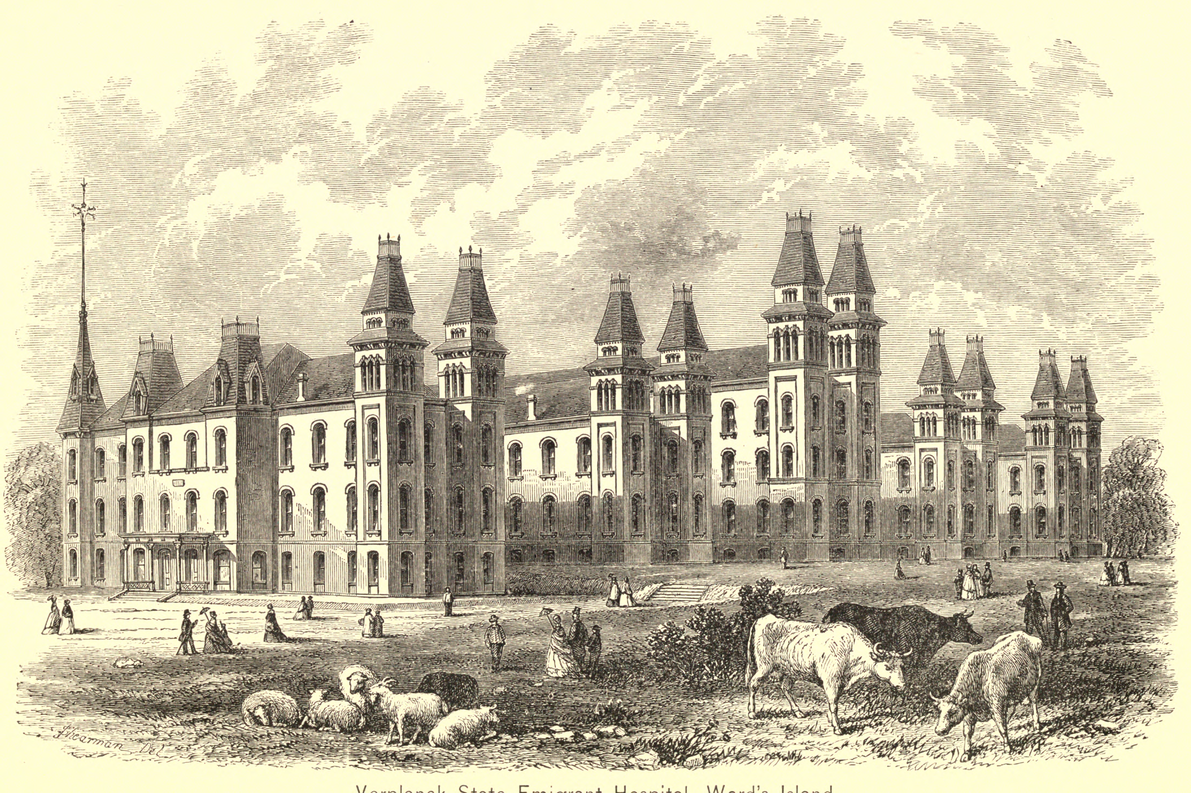
Sketch of the State Emigrant Hospital

The New York State Board of Commissioners of Emigration established Wards Island's first institution, the State Emigrant Hospital, in 1847. They leased some land in 1848, then bought additional land on the island's western shore. The two-story State Emigrant Hospital and the three-story Refuge for Destitute Immigrants on Wards Island both opened in July 1866; its design was based on a plan by the social reformer Florence Nightingale. The main Emigrant Hospital could accommodate 400 or 450 patients and supplemented the city's immigration center, which was then located at Castle Garden. After these structures opened, various other buildings were constructed, including a nursery, two chapels, doctors' residences, and barracks. A mental asylum within the Emigrant Hospital was developed on Wards Island's southwestern corner in the 1870s, following allegations that mentally ill emigrants were being mistreated. The western portion of Wards Island contained a smallpox hospital.

The Commissioners of Public Charities and Correction bought additional land on Wards Island in 1852, though disputes over the purchase continued through the 1860s. Following the development of the New York State Inebriate Asylum in Binghamton, New York, a similar asylum was proposed on Wards Island in 1865. The three-story New York Inebriate Asylum on Wards Island opened in 1868 and served recovering alcoholics. Veterans were housed in the Inebriate Asylum's eastern wing starting in 1869; they remained there until 1875. A contemporary newspaper wrote that the Inebriate Asylum could not accept any more boarders by 1872 because it was so crowded. The New York Inebriate Asylum became the Homeopathic Hospital in September 1875.

A third hospital on Wards Island, Manhattan State Hospital for the Insane, opened in 1871 or 1872 and was located near the middle of the island. The hospital's first building was a three-story Gothic stone structure west of the Inebriate Asylum. By the early 1870s, there were reports that asylum patients were being abused. The structure was known as the Insane Asylum or the Male Lunatic Asylum, a men's asylum, by the early 1880s.

==== Randalls Island institutions ====
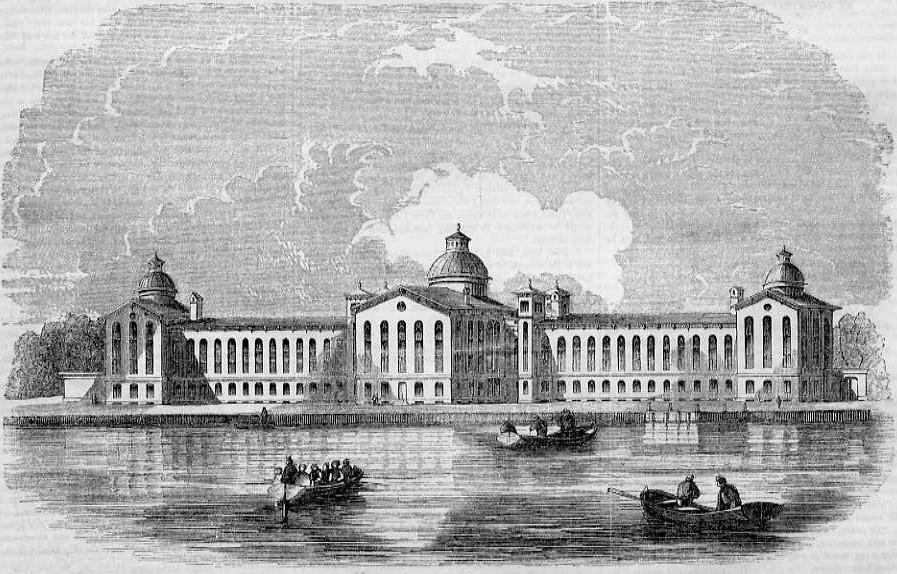
The New York House of Refuge youth detention center in 1855

Randalls Island's first institution was the Nurseries, operated by Commissioners of Public Charities and Correction. In 1847 or 1848, the commissioners completed the Nurseries' first buildings on the northeastern shore. The Nurseries were used by non-criminal youth below age 17. There was a farm on the island's northern shore, as well as a brick detention building. An 1867 article described the complex as including a wooden storage building, boathouse, and a wide road leading to the nursery. At the time, the nursery department comprised eight buildings, while the nursery hospital comprised another five structures.

The Children's Hospital was on the west side of the island. An 1880s map indicates that the Children's Hospital buildings included an infant hospital, insane asylum, and the Randalls Island Hospital from west to east. Due to the poor sanitary conditions, many of the island's infants died from frequent epidemics. Within the Children's Hospital was the Asylum for Juvenile Idiots. There was also the Idiot School, created in 1867 to serve mentally disabled children. One newspaper from the 1880s called Randalls Island "an island full of idiots".

The House of Refuge, for youth with criminal histories, occupied Randalls Island's southern end. It was operated by the Society for the Reformation of Juvenile Delinquents, which took over part of Randalls Island in 1851. Construction began in 1852, and the reformatory opened in 1854; an additional structure for women opened at the House of Refuge in 1860. The House of Refuge consisted of numerous three-and-four-story Italianate buildings, surrounded by a wall. The reformatory was supposed to provide religious classes, non-religious lessons, and manual employment. Though The New York Times said in 1870 that the institution was not intended for punishment, youths were often beaten and malnourished through the end of the century. It also faced overcrowding, with as many as a thousand youths in the 1860s and 1870s.

==== Potter's fields ====
Prior to the 1840s, the city's potter's fields were located on Manhattan Island; the potter's fields had to be relocated every few years as the city developed. A proposal to relocate the potter's fields to Randalls Island was first put forth in 1835, but this did not happen immediately because of concerns that the potter's fields would be too close to the Randalls Island almshouse. A potter's field opened on Randalls Island in 1843, two years before the almshouse was completed. The Randalls Island burial ground covered 75 acres (30 ha) and was likely south of the island's nurseries, though the exact location is unknown. It operated simultaneously with another potter's field on Fourth Avenue in Manhattan. The Randalls Island potter's field operated until 1850, when the almshouse's governors reported that the field had no more space for interments, and the shallow layer of soil made further burials infeasible. Historical studies indicate that around 21,000 people may have been buried on the island; with 120 interments in one pit, this would have required at least 130 pits.

By the mid-1850s, The New York Times regarded the Randalls Island potter's field as "a disgrace to the city". The Corporation of New York thus began acquiring land for the Wards Island potter's field in 1851; it covered 69 to 75 acres (28 to 30 ha). The location of the Wards Island potter's field is also not known, but between 1,000 and 4,000 bodies were interred there each year. Another 100,000 bodies were moved from the Fourth Avenue potter's field to Wards Island, which was completed by 1857. Other bodies were relocated from the Madison Square and Bryant Park graveyards, and immigrants who died at the State Emigrant Hospital were also interred there. About one-third of the bodies were immigrants, who were interred for an additional fee, under an agreement with the emigration commissioners.

When the Wards Island potter's field was in operation, coffins were delivered to a cove on the island's southern shore. They were stored at a receiving vault nearby for a short time, in case families wanted to claim the remains. Unclaimed coffins were placed in mass graves, consisting of trenches measuring 300 by 18 by 15 feet (91.4 by 5.5 by 4.6 m). After the trenches were filled, the trenches were covered with topsoil, and trees were planted above them. There were two separate clusters of mass graves, one each for Catholics and Protestants; burials in either cluster were overseen by a cleric from the respective denomination. No headstones were installed above the mass graves, as the bodies were not identifiable. The cemetery did contain individual graves, which were interred to the west of the mass graves. By 1868, there were calls to relocate the island's mass graves because people were increasingly relocating along the East River shoreline, across from Wards Island.

=== Late 19th and early 20th century changes ===
==== Wards Island changes ====
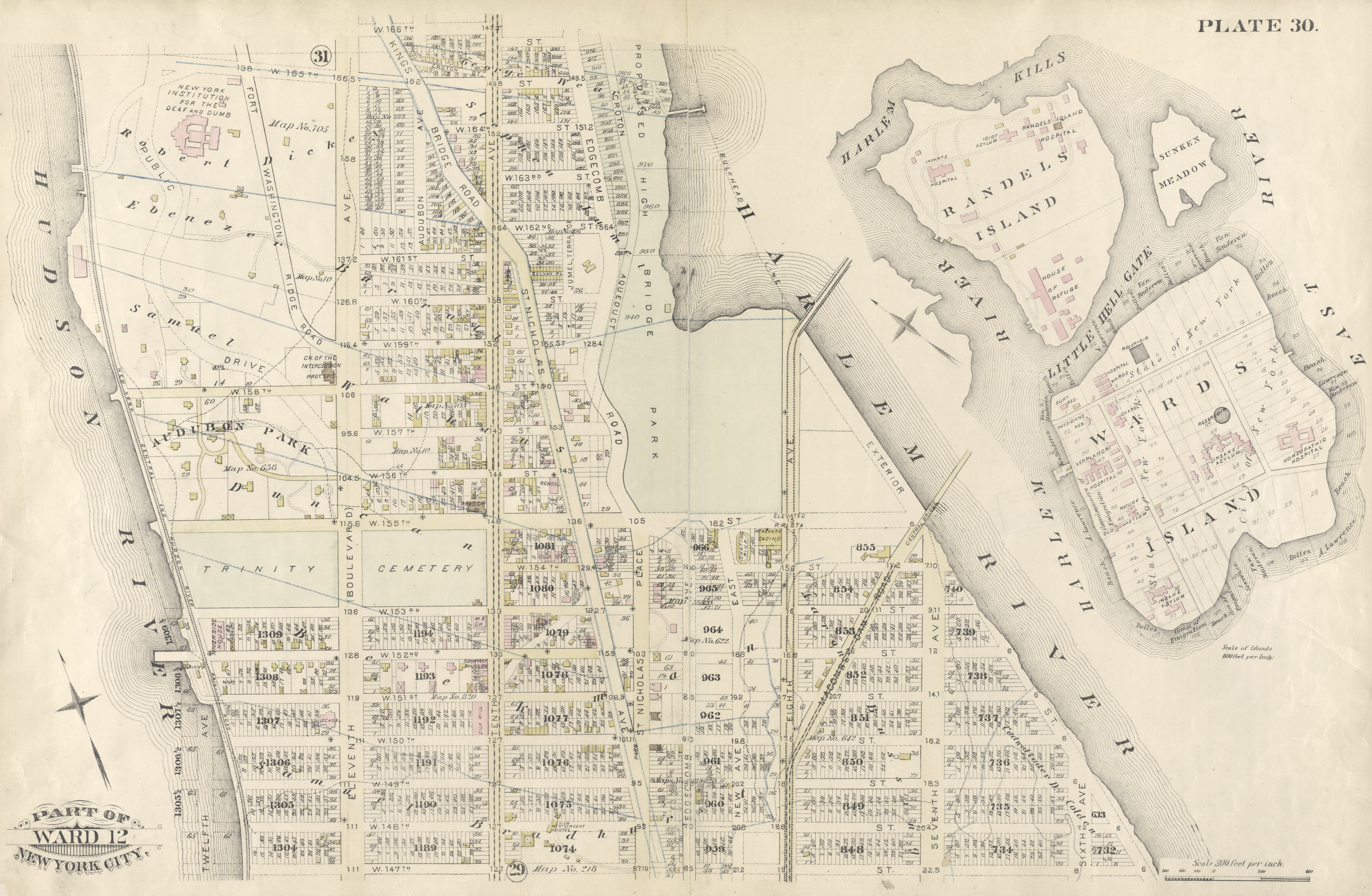
An 1885 map showing Randalls, Wards, and Sunken Meadow Islands as three separate landmasses

Wards Island began receiving freshwater from the New York City water supply system in the early 1870s. By 1874, the corpses in the Wards Island potter's field were relocated to Hart Island in the Bronx. Later the same year, the emigration commissioners established an immigrants' cemetery on Wards Island after several immigrants' families complained about the way their bodies were treated on Hart Island. Two reservoirs were added to Wards Island by the late 1870s; maps indicate that the island remained largely unchanged until the end of the century, aside from new roads. By the early 1880s, control of Wards Island was split between the Commissioners of Emigration (which operated the State Emigrant Hospital and an attached asylum, nursery, and "houses of refuge") and the Commissioners of Public Charities and Correction (which operated institutions such as the Homeopathic Hospital and the Insane Asylum).

During the 1880s, there were complaints over the mistreatment of people at Wards Island's Insane Asylum. In addition, there were concerns that the Wards Islands buildings were not fireproof, and the emigration commissioners demanded in 1885 that the charities and correction commissioners vacate one of the Wards Islands buildings. By 1887, overcrowding on Wards Island had compelled the charities and correction commissioners to develop another asylum on Long Island. There were proposals to turn over the state-owned Emigrant Hospital buildings on Wards Island to the city government. The Emigration Commission proposed selling the Emigrant Hospital property to the city for about $2 million in 1890. Despite objections to the abandonment of the Emigrant Hospital buildings, the hospital was replaced by Ellis Island's immigration station in 1892. That May, the city acquired the island, taking over 35 buildings on approximately 120 acres (49 ha). The Emigrant Hospital buildings became part of Wards Island's Insane Asylum, which was still beset by allegations of mismanagement. The Homeopathic Hospital relocated to Blackwell's (Roosevelt) Island in 1894, becoming the Metropolitan Hospital.

The Manhattan State Hospital took over Wards Island's immigration and asylum buildings in 1896. Part of the hospital was rebuilt following a fire the next year, and additional hospital buildings were proposed on Wards Island to relieve overcrowding. With 4,400 patients by 1899, the Manhattan State Hospital was the world's largest psychiatric hospital. A solarium was added to the State Hospital in the early 1900s, and there were proposals for a lighthouse on Wards Island (which was not built). Part of Wards Island was acquired for the construction of the Hell Gate Bridge, a railroad bridge between the Bronx and Queens; work on the bridge commenced in 1911. The Manhattan State Hospital unsuccessfully tried to prevent the construction of the span across Wards Island, and the bridge was completed in 1917. In addition, the state leased Wards Island from the city for 50 years beginning in 1914.

The Mabon Building was erected south of the Wards Island asylum by the early 1920s. After 27 people died in a fire at the Manhattan Psychiatric Center in 1923, investigators blamed the fire on overcrowding and said the island's fire apparatus could not sufficiently protect the island's buildings. The city was studying the possibility of erecting a sewage disposal plant on the island by that year. By 1926, the Manhattan State Hospital had an estimated population of 7,000. Additional buildings on the island's northern tip were completed by the 1920s. In addition, Mayor John Hylan proposed a sewage treatment plant on Wards Island in 1925.

==== Randalls Island changes ====
In the mid-1870s, a seawall was built around Randalls Island, along with some docks, and there were also proposals to lay a freshwater pipe to the island. By the following decade, Randalls Island had the House of Refuge, the Children's Hospital, and the Idiot Asylum, and there were complaints over the mistreatment of people at the House of Refuge. The city's Charities Department took over Randalls Island's schools from the Department of Education in 1888. The Randall's Island Hospital and Schools were created in 1892 through a merger of the Randalls Island Hospital, Idiot School, and Asylum for Juvenile Idiots. Randalls Island was still home to sick children, orphans, juvenile delinquents, and mentally disabled children. The House of Refuge stopped accepting prisoners in 1897 because of unsanitary conditions, and there were reports of high infant mortality on the island, including an inflammatory editorial protest in the new Yiddish socialist newspaper, Forverts. New facilities were planned on Randalls Island in the late 1890s, including a steam plant, a nurses' home, and a playroom building.

Randalls Island's industrial school burned down in 1900. The Infants' Hospital was combined with the Randalls Island Hospital and School in 1902, and the latter organization became Randalls Island Hospitals, Schools, and Asylum. During the first decade of the 20th century, there were calls to relocate the boys' reformatory from Randalls Island. Though the state passed legislation to allow the House of Refuge's relocation in 1904, the reformatory remained for three decades. In the mid-1900s, there was a proposal to convert Randalls Island into a public park, as well as a plan for a new tuberculosis hospital on that island. On Wards Island, Manhattan State Hospital was facing overcrowding by the 1900s, and there were continuing concerns about the flammability of the buildings on Wards Island. The state agreed to sell its land on Randalls Island to the city in 1907, while the city concurrently planned to lease Wards Island to the state for a new psychiatric hospital. City government architect Raymond F. Almirall filed plans for a four-story nurses' home on Randalls Island the next year; that building opened in 1912.

In the 1910s, Almirall drew up plans to redevelop Randalls Island into a park, but the Municipal Art Commission rejected his proposal. Part of the island was also used for the construction of the Hell Gate Bridge. The city took over the state-owned section of Randalls Island in 1914. The state government also began investigating conditions on the island in the mid-1910s, following allegations of mismanagement. The poor conditions prompted proposals to rebuild the 75 structures on Randalls Island, The city's public charities commissioner devised plans to rebuild the Children's Hospital and School in 1916, and work on the new buildings began the following year. During the late 1910s, a park on Randalls Island was again proposed, along with a home for mentally disabled women. In addition, the city's public charities department introduced reforms to the island's hospital, including hiring additional physicians and attendants.

=== Mid-20th century to present ===
==== 1930s ====
Construction of a second bridge across the two islands—the Triborough (now RFK) Bridge, connecting Manhattan, Queens, and the Bronx—began in 1929. The next year, the city's Sanitary Commission requested funding from the city's Board of Estimate for a new sewage treatment plant on Wards Island. The Board of Estimate approved $7.67 million for the sewage plant that October, and preliminary work began the next month; a groundbreaking ceremony for the 50-acre (20 ha) treatment plant occurred in 1931. Plans for an administration building and several other structures on the northeast part of Wards Island were filed in 1931, and plans for a fertilizer building and storage building were filed the next year. Part of Wards Island, which had never been deeded to the city, was sold to Metropolitan-Columbia Stockholders Inc. in 1933; this land was later seized for the bridge. The construction of the Triborough Bridge required the demolition of buildings on both islands, and patients were sometimes moved to more crowded facilities. The New York City Department of Hospitals planned to replace the hospitals with Seaview Hospital on Staten Island. The House of Refuge's youth were relocated upstate, and the patients in the Children's Hospital were moved to Flushing, Queens.

The first two phases of the sewage plant were finished in 1934. That April, in anticipation of the Triborough Bridge's completion, city parks commissioner Robert Moses announced that he would convert 140 acres (57 ha) on Randalls Island to parkland. The park plans were announced in February 1935, and work began soon thereafter. Most of Randalls Island's 87 buildings were to be razed and replaced with various athletic facilities such as a stadium. Moses wanted to expand the park onto Sunken Meadow and Wards Island, but Manhattan State Hospital on Wards Island was still leased by the state until 1943. The sewage plant's fourth phase was funded in 1935 after several years of delays. The following year, Moses canceled his plan to convert Wards Island into a park due to difficulties in relocating the hospital.

The Triborough Bridge formally opened in July 1936, along with the Randalls Island Stadium and Randalls Island Park. A police boat repair shop on Randalls Island was completed in March 1937, and the sewage plant was finished that October. A low-level bridge between the islands opened the same year, replacing a ferry line from Manhattan to Wards Island. Plans to convert Wards Island into a park were revived in early 1938, when the state government agreed to close Manhattan State Hospital. The Works Progress Administration began developing the southern end of Wards Island that year, demolishing what was left of the Homeopathic Hospital. The city took over Sunken Meadow Island in 1939 for an expansion of Wards Island's sewage treatment plant, and a set of clay tennis courts opened on Randalls Island the same year.

==== 1940s to 1960s ====
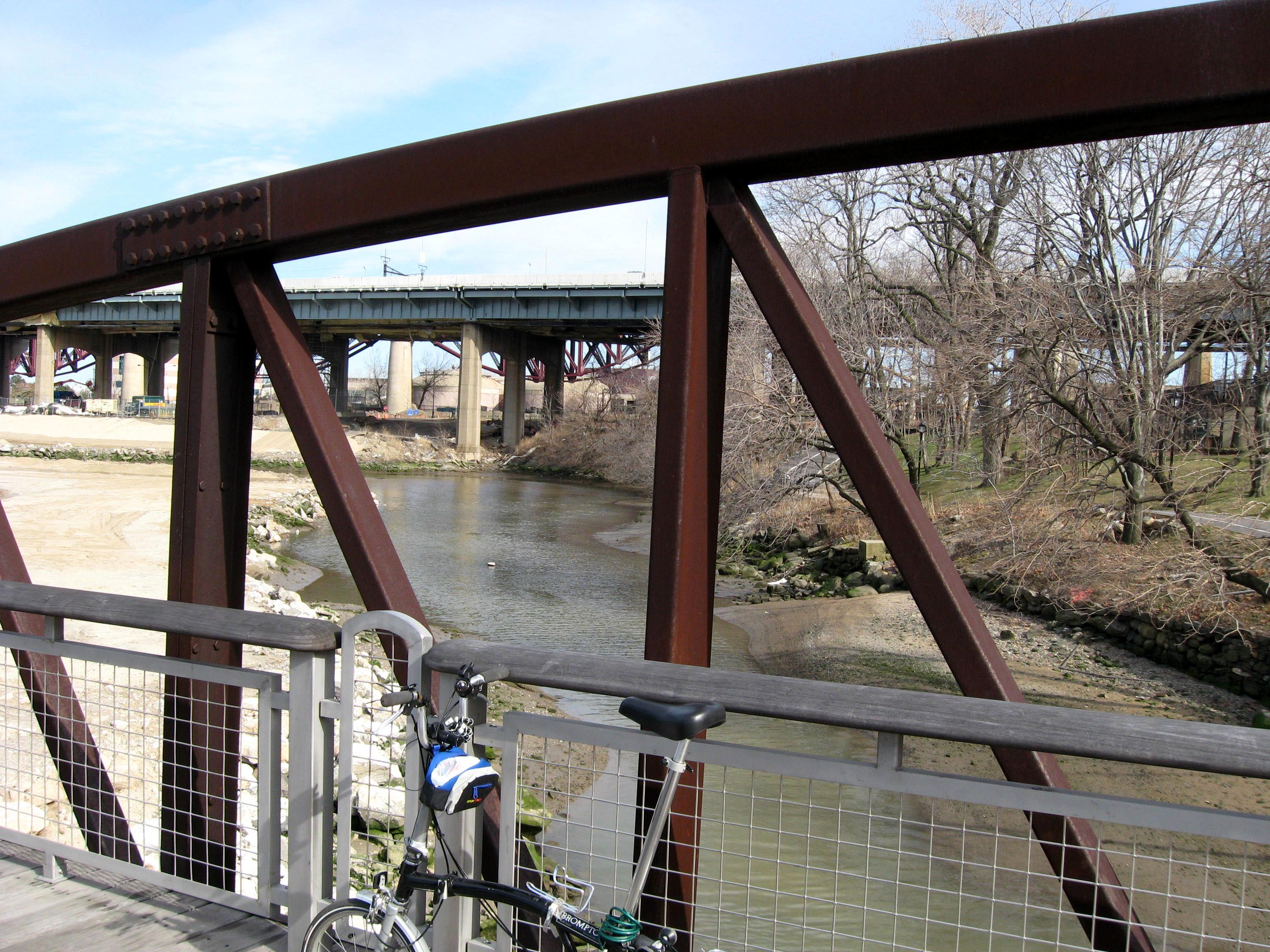
Looking east from the footbridge at the mouth of the Little Hell Gate waterway toward the Triborough Bridge viaduct, 2008

Work on a restroom, field house, and five softball fields on Randalls Island began in 1941. To allow public access to the new fields, city officials wanted to build a causeway from Randalls Island to the Bronx. Wards Island Park was delayed during the 1940s, and Manhattan State Hospital remained open past 1943, despite having been ordered to shut down. In early 1946, the city and state agreed to extend the state's lease of Wards Island to 1948, after which part of the island would become a city park; the state would retain control of the island's northwest corner. The same year, the state announced that it would rebuild Manhattan State Hospital. The rest of Wards Island was to be converted into a park, and a new bridge would be built from Manhattan to Wards Island. The New York City Department of Parks and Recreation (NYC Parks) also announced that it would build an overpass to the Bronx and infill Bronx Kill to make way for additional recreational fields on Randalls Island.

The Wards Island Bridge opened in 1951, along with the recreational facilities on Wards Island. Initially, there was a playground, picnic grove, three softball fields, and three baseball fields on Wards Island. Though NYC Parks originally planned to expand the park onto Manhattan State Hospital's site, the city government ultimately decided to allow the state to keep operating Manhattan State Hospital. Two chapels were developed on the island in the mid-1950s. By the mid-1950s, Wards Island Park had few visitors. Whereas Randalls Island Park was easily accessible via car, Wards Island Park's only public access was via the footbridge (the span over Little Hell Gate span was for hospital visitors only). Sunken Meadow, which had been reserved for an expansion of the Wards Island sewage plant, was freed up for recreational uses when the city decided in the mid-1950s to build a treatment plant elsewhere. Despite Moses's efforts to take over Wards Island, additional hospital buildings were approved in 1954. Three new buildings were erected for Manhattan State Hospital. The older hospital buildings were destroyed, and a homeless shelter, rehabilitation center, and other structures were built on that site.

The city government announced in 1955 that it planned to connect Randalls and Wards Islands by allowing private contractors to dump debris within Little Hell Gate for free. After the channel had been infilled, NYC Parks would expand the two islands' parks. Moses also proposed closing Little Hell Gate and erecting a yacht marina on the former stream's site. The Triborough Bridge and Tunnel Authority announced in 1962 that it would allow contractors to fill the eastern portion of Little Hell Gate and the northern corner of Randalls Island. Randalls and Wards Islands were conjoined by the late 1960s, allowing the construction of more recreational facilities on the filled land.

Randalls Island hosted opera performances by the Popular Price Grand Opera Company until 1961, when the city demanded that the singers pay a $250 license fee. A mental research laboratory on Wards Island was proposed in 1960. Wards Island Park remained underused, and The New York Times said in 1963 that the park was generally neglected and full of garbage. Work on a 200-bed hospital for mentally disabled children on Wards Island began in 1965, and New York governor Nelson Rockefeller announced a mental hospital complex on that island in 1967. A rehabilitation center at the base of the Manhattan State Hospital was built on the island in the late 1960s. A 45-acre (18 ha) recreation area with ballfields and a fieldhouse was built on the former Sunken Meadow Island after the filling operation was complete; the recreation area opened in 1968. The city's parks commissioner also sought to designate both Randalls and Wards Islands as an area for large gatherings.

==== 1970s to early 1990s ====
A new running track was installed in Randalls Island's Downing Stadium in 1970 and again in 1979. Residents of nearby areas frequented Randalls Island Park, and particularly the Sunken Meadow recreation area, during that decade. Meanwhile, Wards Island's hospitals had been split into three units by the early 1970s, and robberies, rapes, and break-ins on the island were common. There were allegations of mismanagement at Wards Island's hospitals, and the drug-treatment facility there closed in 1971. A facility for severely mentally disabled patients on Wards Island opened in 1974 and closed three years later. During the decade, a training academy for the New York City Fire Department (FDNY) was built on the two islands, opening in 1975. The Manhattan State Hospital became the Manhattan Psychiatric Center in the late 1970s, and its population decreased by nearly 90 percent from 1926 to the late 20th century.

A homeless shelter opened on Wards Island in 1980, following a court order. Known as the Charles H. Gay Homeless Shelter, the facility faced opposition from the outset and also became overcrowded; it was thus expanded in 1982. Downing Stadium was also renovated in the early 1980s, but the stadium continued to decay and had to be renovated again within half a decade. A maximum-security mental health facility was developed on the island in 1984. By the late 1980s, the Wards Island sewage treatment plant was operating over capacity, prompting city officials to announce an expansion of the plant. In addition, part of the Charles H. Gay Shelter was converted to a women's jail in 1989 to accommodate the increasing number of inmates in the city. A Newsday report from the late 1980s found the island's park to be relatively safe but also poorly maintained. The park was used by dozens of local schools at the time and had various baseball, rugby, tennis, softball, soccer, lacrosse, and cricket fields.

==== 1990s and early 2000s redevelopment plan ====
The city considered building an incinerator on Wards Island in the early 1990s, as well as a facility to convert waste into sludge. NYC Parks also agreed in 1990 to allow the American Golf Corporation to develop and operate a 36-hole miniature golf course on Randalls Island, in addition to a driving range and batting cages. Work began in 1992, and the golf center opened the next year. The New York Riding Academy also had a horse stable on the island in the 1990s. The Randall's Island Sports Foundation (RISF) was founded in 1992 to maintain Randalls Island Park. During the next two years, RISF took over much of the islands' maintenance. The city devised plans to restore Downing Stadium, and by 1994 there were plans to spend $227 million on recreational facilities. At the time, the islands' many sporting facilities were very hard to access. In addition, there were fears that the presence of the Charles H. Gay Center and the Wards Island Bridge were contributing to increased crime in neighboring East Harlem.

RISF presented proposals for a redevelopment of the two islands in 1995. Other developments took place on the islands in the mid- and late 1990s, including a renovation of a FDNY library a new homeless shelter, an expansion of the Randalls Island golf center, and additional sporting fields. In 1999, the New York City government proposed allowing a private development project on Randalls and Wards Island to raise money for a renovation of Randalls Island Park. By then, the island accommodated up to 50,000 people per day during the summer, accommodating various children's and adults' sports teams. The plan entailed demolishing Downing Stadium; adding an amphitheater and new athletic facilities, restoring wetlands; building trails, marinas, restaurants, and ferry stops; and constructing a water park. The proposal, known privately as Operation Grand Slam, was to be funded by RISF, city, state, and federal governments. RISF successor Randall's Island Park Alliance hired Zurita Architects in 2000 to devise a master plan for the park's redevelopment.

==== Mid-2000s to present ====
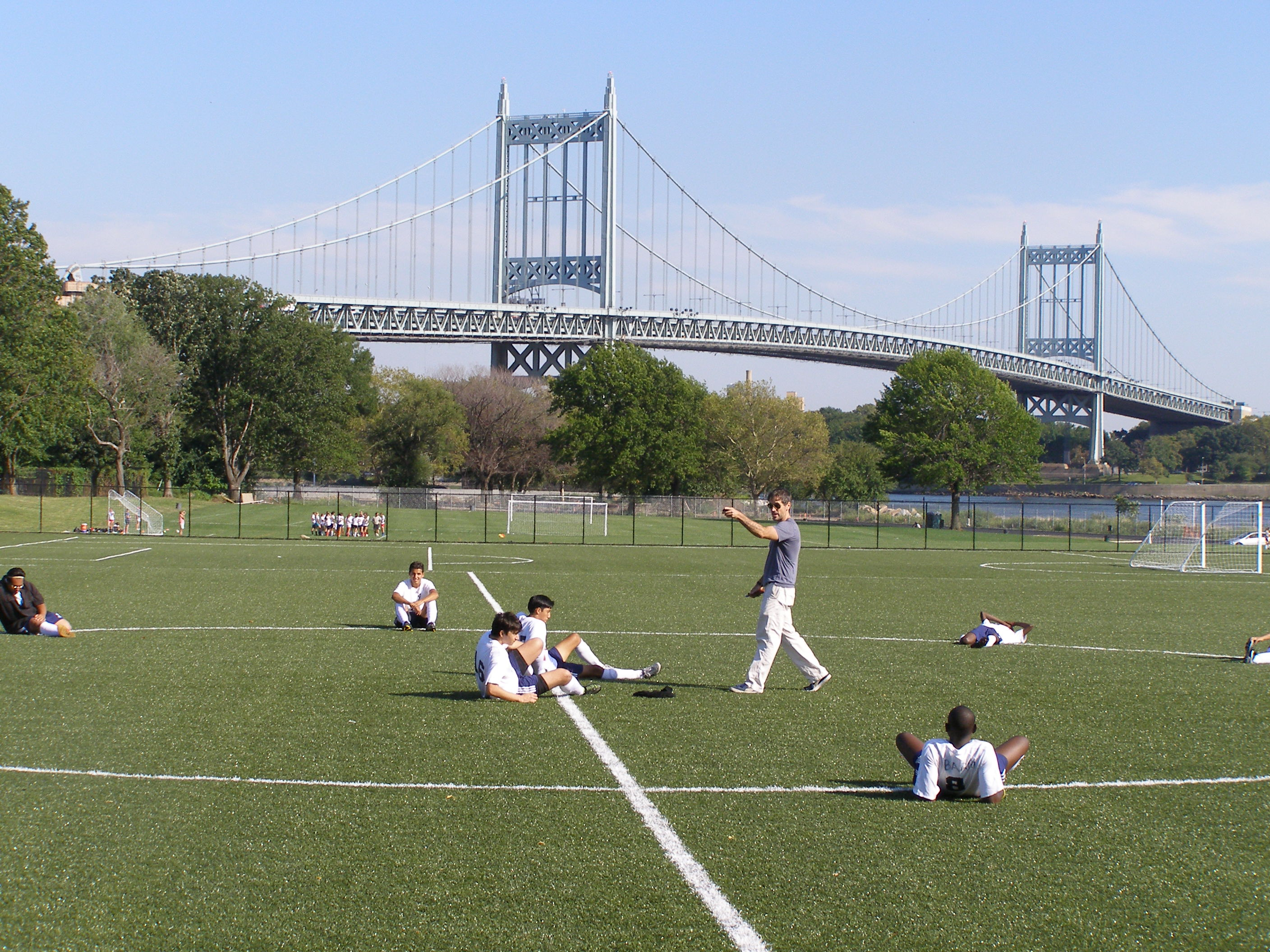
Fields on Wards Island, 2008

Icahn Stadium opened on Randalls Island in 2005, replacing the old Downing Stadium. A water park was approved on Randalls Island in 2006 but was canceled the next year over financing difficulties; the water park's investors later sued the city for mismanagement. In April 2006, the first section of a waterfront pathway opened on Randalls Island, and officials began restoring the Little Hell Gate wetlands. The salt marsh on Randalls and Wards Island was restored in the 2000s, and additional recreational fields were built on the island as well. The city government proposed allowing private schools to fund many of the new fields, which were expected to cost $70 million in total. In 2007, a group of 20 private schools agreed to pay the city government $52.4 million, in exchange for the exclusive use of two-thirds of the island's fields during weekday afternoons. This prompted a lawsuit from families of East Harlem public-school students, who were forced to share the remaining fields. Amid the lawsuit, the city began constructing 63 fields on the island in August 2007. State courts twice invalidated the private schools' agreement with the city, and the private schools ended up receiving exclusive control over the fields for free.

The Randalls Island Connector footbridge opened in 2015, connecting the island with the Bronx. The George Rosenfeld Center for Recovery opened in September 2017 on Wards Island. Randall's Island Park received $950,000 in 2021 and another $22 million in 2022 for upgrades to Randalls and Wards Island's pathways. A short-lived migrant shelter opened at Randalls Island in 2022 and was replaced by a larger shelter in 2023. There was public opposition to the migrant shelter, which took up several soccer fields. One of the island's homeless shelters, the Clarke Thomas Mental Health Shelter, closed in 2022. Migrants began sleeping outside the Randalls Island migrant shelter following a series of violent crimes there, but the outdoor encampment was dismantled in August 2024. That October, the city government announced that the larger migrant shelter would close in February 2025. In September 2025, the Randall's Island Park Alliance began constructing a nature center for $6 million.

== Parks and recreation ==
=== Randalls Island Park ===
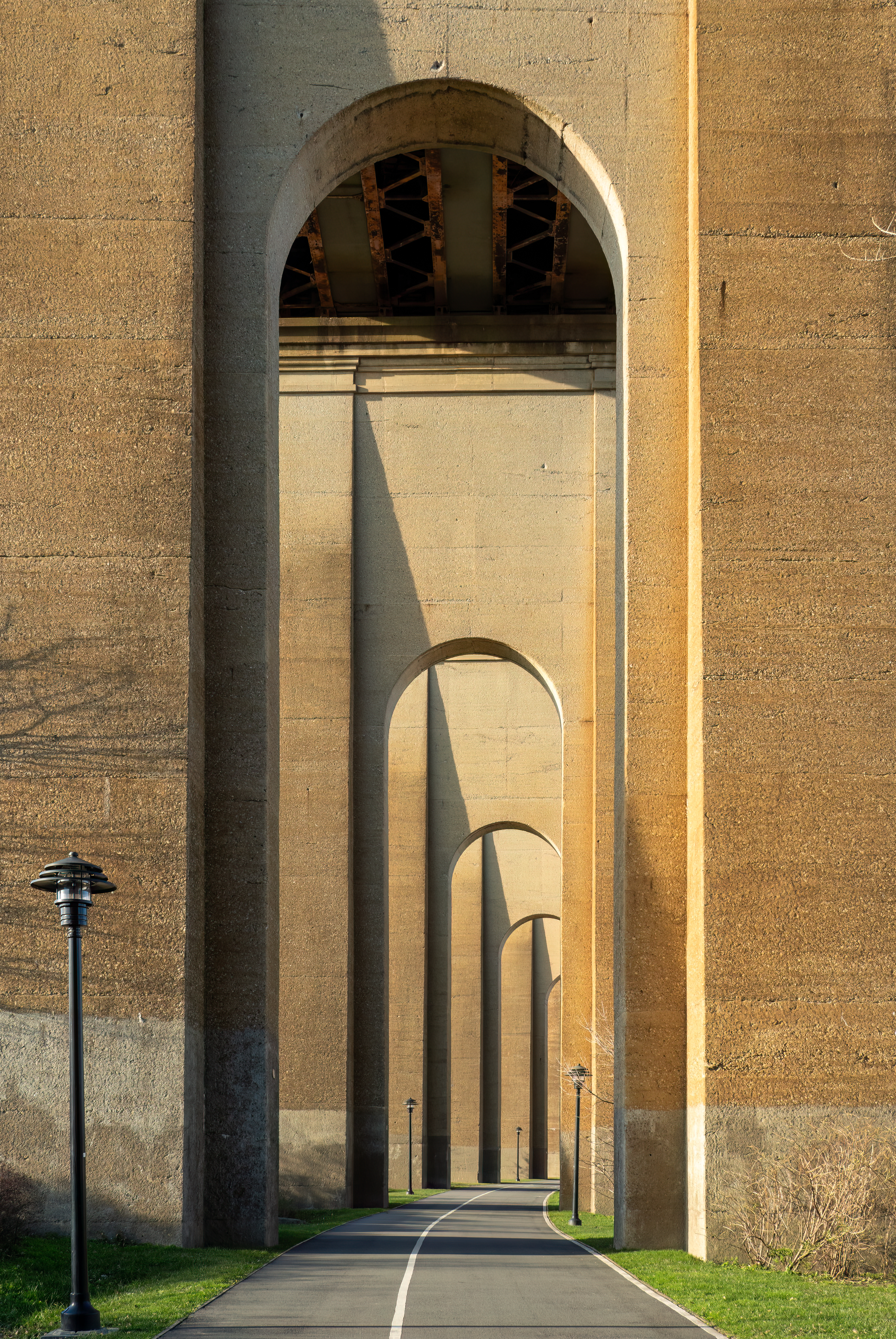
Hell Gate Bridge walking path

Randalls Island Park was created in 1936 and was originally centered around the Triborough Bridge's T-shaped viaduct. Wards Island Park, which is connected with Randalls Island Park, was acquired by the city in 1936 and 1939. The park is operated by the Randall's Island Park Alliance (RIPA), a 501(c)(3) organization. RIPA was founded in 1992 as the Randall Island Sports Foundation, and it operates free youth programs and workshops throughout the year. The park has also hosted music concerts and festivals, including the Governors Ball Music Festival, Panorama Music Festival, Rock the Bells, Farm Aid, Underground Garage Festival, and Electric Zoo Festival. The park also hosts One Bite Pizza Festival by Dave Portnoy, an annual pizza festival organized by the production company Medium Rare.

According to RIPA, in the 2010s, Randalls Island Park had 30 to 40 percent of Manhattan's baseball fields. The park includes the Randall's Island Park Golf Center, which covers 18 acres (7.3 ha). The golf center opened in 1990 with a driving range, miniature golf course, and pro shop; the driving range was renovated in 2008 with 82 stalls. The Sportime Randall's Island Tennis Center opened in 2009 and contains ten Har-Tru clay courts (all outdoors), five DecoTurf courts (five indoors and five outdoors), a fitness center, recreation room, and pro shop. The center houses the John McEnroe Tennis Academy. There are various recreational fields that are used by public and private schools. Randalls Island Park contains over 8 miles (13 km) of pedestrian and bike pathways and connects with Manhattan, the Bronx, and Queens. The proposed Harlem River Greenway, which started construction in 2025, would connect Randalls Island with the Bronx's Van Cortlandt Park to the north.

==== Stadiums ====
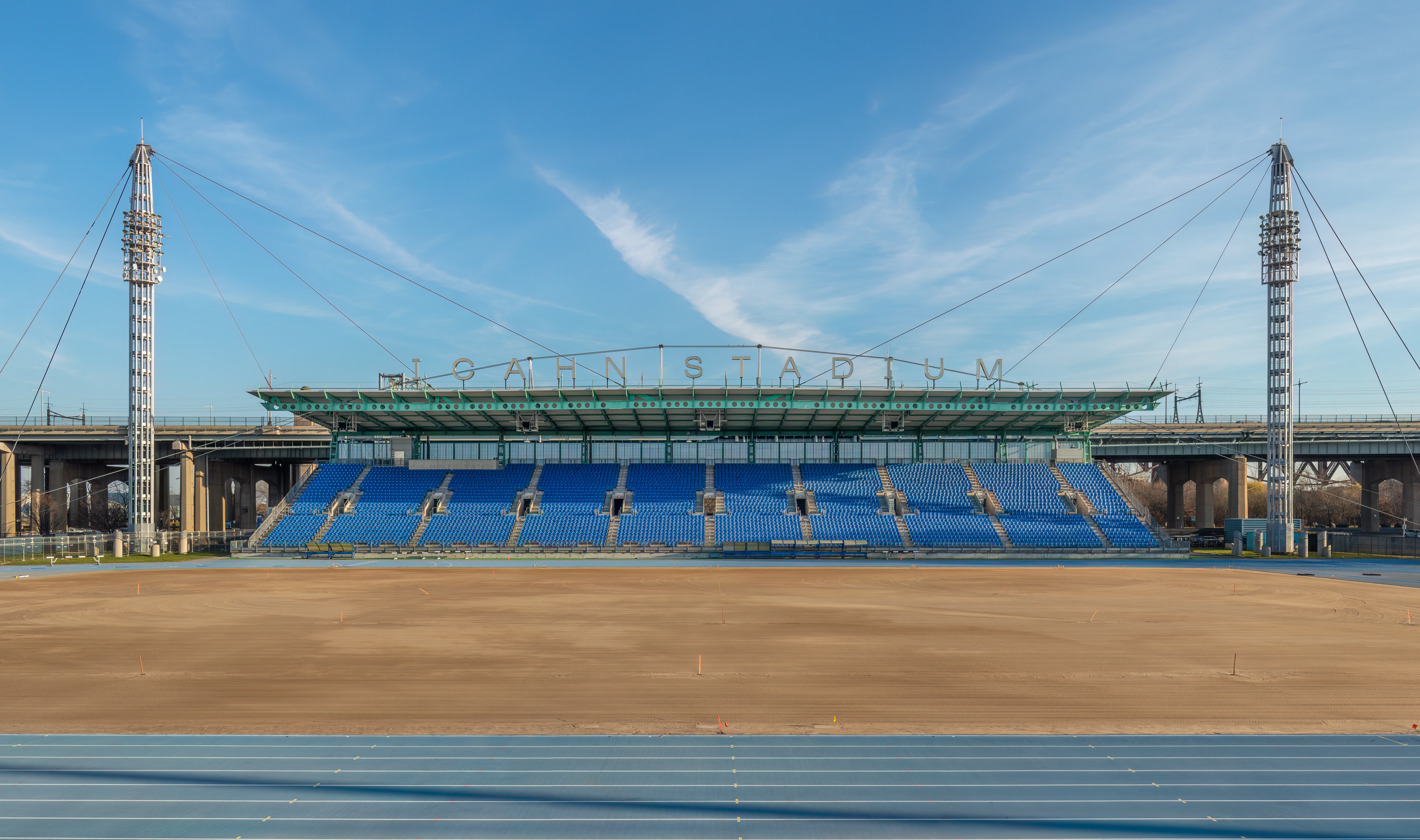
Icahn Stadium

The first stadium built on the island was Downing Stadium, a 25,000-seat venue with a 30-foot-wide (9.1 m) running track, which surrounded a grass field for other sports. It opened as the Randalls Island Stadium on July 12, 1936, and consisted of a 30-foot-wide (9.1 m) running track, which surrounded a grass field for other sports. The venue was renamed in 1955 for NYC Parks employee John J. Downing. Among Downing Stadium's notable events were the 1936 Olympic track-and-field trials, as well as the 1964 Olympic track-and-field trials for the American women's team. Over the years, the stadium also hosted track, football, and soccer games, though it hosted no major events from 1966 to 1991. Its other events had included the Lollapalooza music festival and the Gay Games.

Downing Stadium was demolished in 2002 and replaced by Icahn Stadium, which opened on April 23, 2005. Icahn Stadium is named for Carl Icahn, the venue's primary financier, and contains 4,754 seats. Its running track was designed by Hillier Group Architecture and was intended to host major track-and-field events.

=== Wetlands ===
There are two saltmarshes and a freshwater wetland on the island. Through the process of excavating over 20,000 cubic yards (15,000 m^{3}) of debris, installing clean sand, and planting native marsh grasses, 4 acres (1.6 ha) of saltmarsh has been created surrounding the Little Hell Gate Inlet on the western edge of Randalls and Wards Island. Just across from the Little Hell Gate saltmarsh, 4 acres (1.6 ha) of freshwater wetlands were also established. After the removal of almost 15,000 cubic yards (11,000 m^{3}) of debris and fill, the freshwater wetland site was planted with native herbaceous, shrub, and tree species, such as switchgrass, aster, dogwood, and oak. The wetlands are part of a stormwater filtration system across Randalls and Wards Island. A footbridge crosses the salt marsh as well.

In 2012, the New York City Department of Parks and Recreation approved a $1 million contract with Natural Currents Energy Services to generate renewable energy in the park. The project was expected to produce 200 kW of solar, wind, and tidal energy to power the island's facilities. The project was planned to include a solar-powered marine research and information kiosk that would have been open to visitors of the island.

== Facilities ==
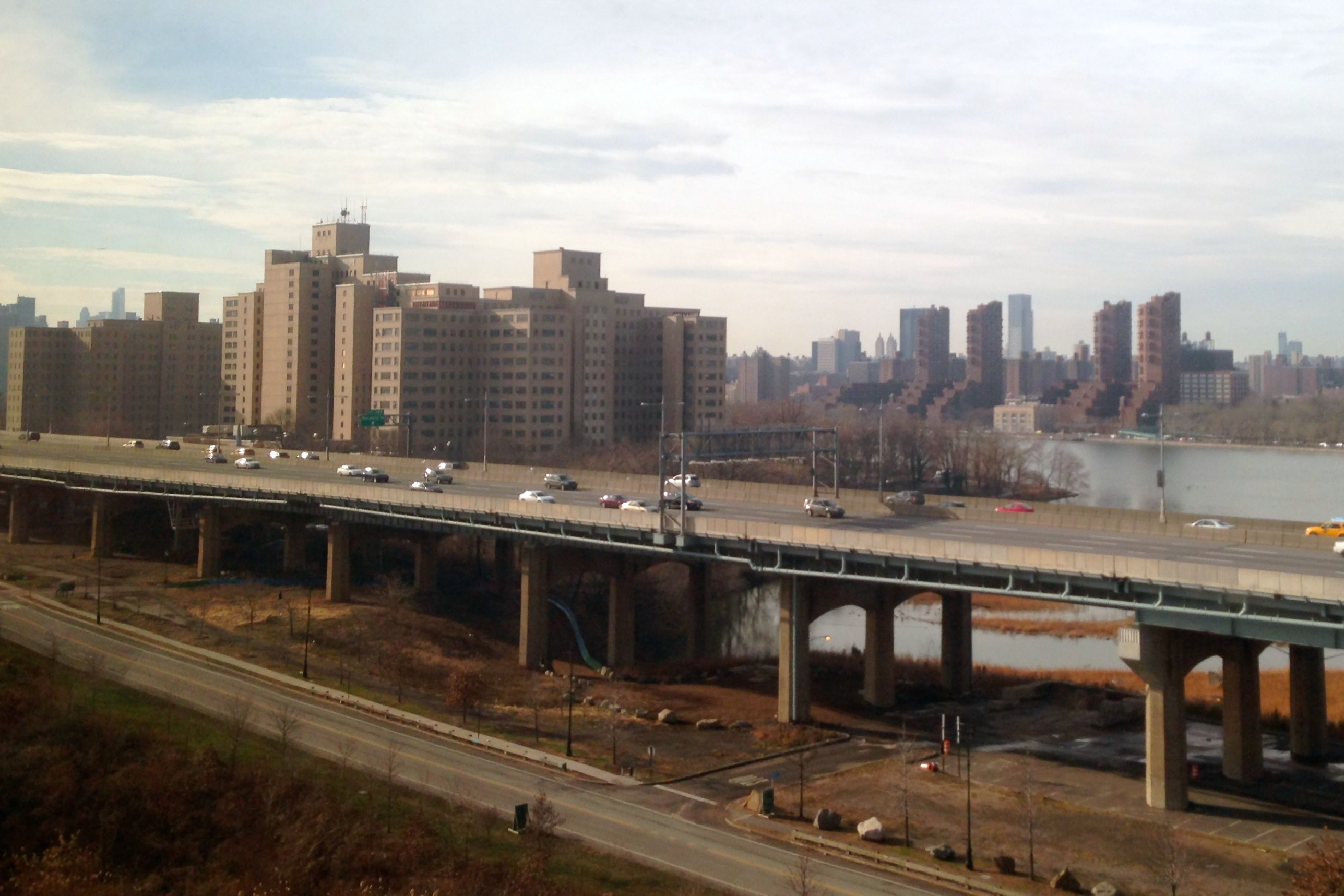
The Manhattan Psychiatric Center and Kirby Forensic Psychiatric Center (behind the spans of the Triborough Bridge), 2013

=== Hospitals and shelters ===
Wards Island is home to the Manhattan Psychiatric Center and the Kirby Forensic Psychiatric Center, both operated by the State Office of Mental Health. The Kirby Center houses some of New York state's violent mentally ill patients. The island also contains homeless shelters run by the New York City Department of Homeless Services. These include the Charles H. Gay Homeless Shelter, which accommodated 900 men by the 2000s, making it the largest homeless shelter in New York City.

The George Rosenfeld Center for Recovery, operated by Odyssey House, opened in September 2017 on Wards Island. It has about 230 beds for women and older adults. The treatment center includes a childcare center.

In October 2022, amid a citywide migrant housing crisis caused by a large influx of migrants seeking asylum in the United States, the administration of mayor Eric Adams announced that the city government would open an 84,000-square-foot (7,800 m^{2}) shelter on Randalls Island. The shelter consisted of 500 beds for male migrants, but fewer than half of the beds were filled within two weeks of the shelter's opening. The Adams administration closed the migrant shelter in November 2022 due to a decrease in the number of new migrants. In August 2023, a migrant shelter for 3,000 people opened at Randalls Island after the number of asylum seekers traveling to the city increased sharply.

=== Emergency services and utilities ===
==== Fire and police facilities ====
The New York State Police has a station on Wards Island, Troop NYC, which serves the New York City metropolitan area. The station also includes a barracks. The New York City Parks Enforcement Patrol operates a training academy on Randalls Island. NYC Parks' Five Borough Administrative Building is located on Randalls Island; that building complex contains a green roof. The New York City Police Department Street Crime Unit was headquartered on Randalls Island until it was disbanded in 1999.

The New York City Fire Department operates a training academy on Randalls Island. Designed by Hardy Holzman Pfeiffer Associates, the complex consists of nine buildings, which include classroom structures as well as mockups of real New York City buildings. The academy's facilities include classrooms, a water supply tank, a replica of a subway tunnel with tracks and two railcars, a training course for engine drivers, a helicopter pad, a replica ship, and multiple buildings. The streets in the academy are named in honor of several firefighters who died while on duty. The fire academy is also used by film and TV series directors who conduct shoots there.

==== Sewage plant ====
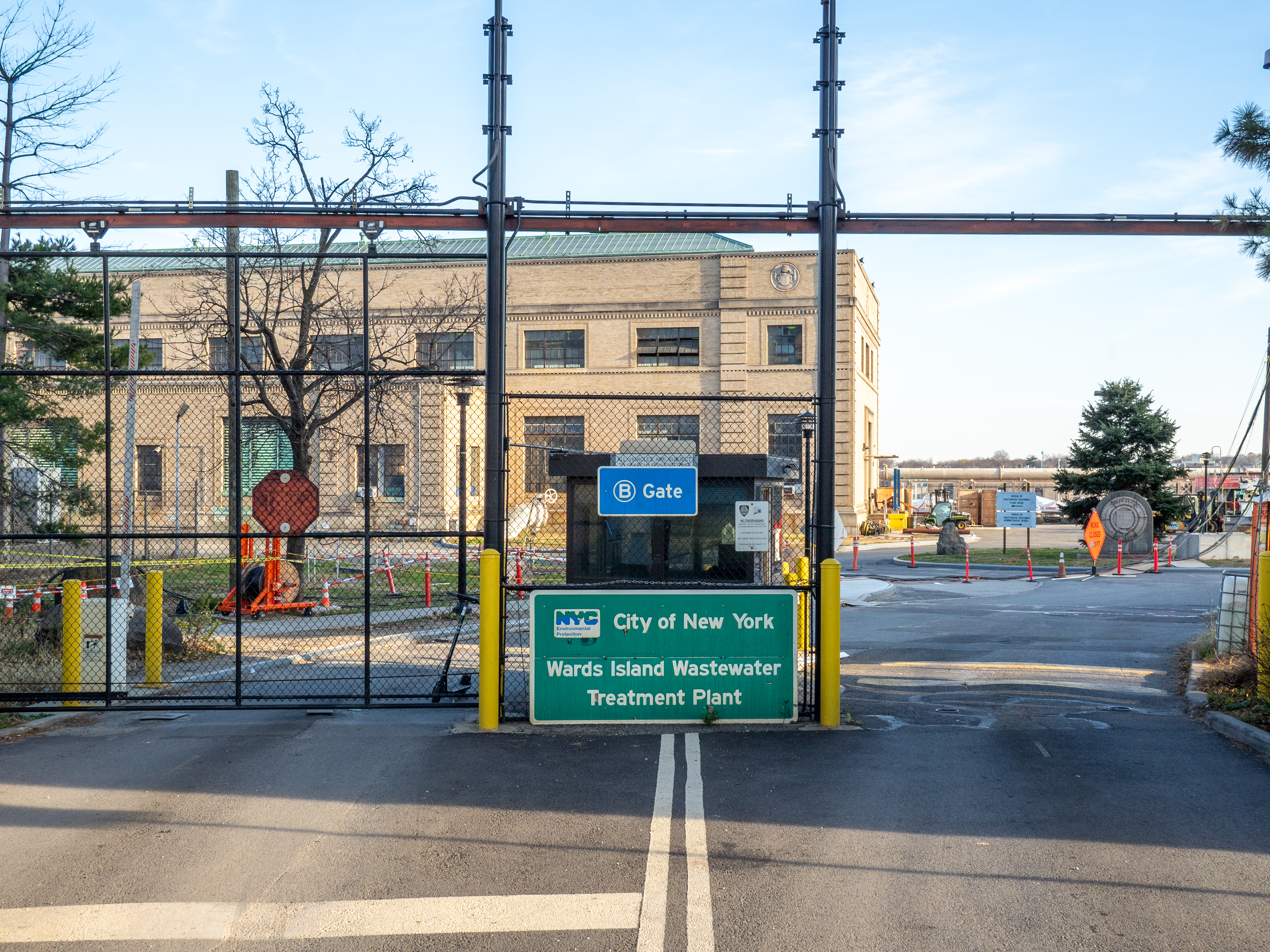
Wards Island Wastewater Treatment Plant

A wastewater treatment plant, the Wards Island Water Pollution Control Plant, is operated by the New York City Department of Environmental Protection. It is located northeast of the Hell Gate railroad bridge. Before the plant was developed, sewage from these areas was dumped directly into the city's rivers. The plant originally occupied 77 acres (31 ha) on Wards Island's northeast corner and could treat up to 180 million U.S. gallons (680×10^{6} L) (Note: Sometimes cited as 190 million U.S. gallons (720×10^{6} L)) of raw sewage daily when it opened in 1937. A series of tunnels transports sewage to the plant from Upper Manhattan and the Bronx. As of 2024, the modern plant has a capacity of 275 million U.S. gallons (1.04 gigaliters) per day. The city planned to install 7 megawatts of solar power at the plant as of 2021.

The treatment plant receives sewage from two "grit chambers", one each in Manhattan and the Bronx, which filter out debris before the sewage reaches the plant. The Bronx chamber is a New York City designated landmark.

== Transportation ==
=== Road and rail bridges ===
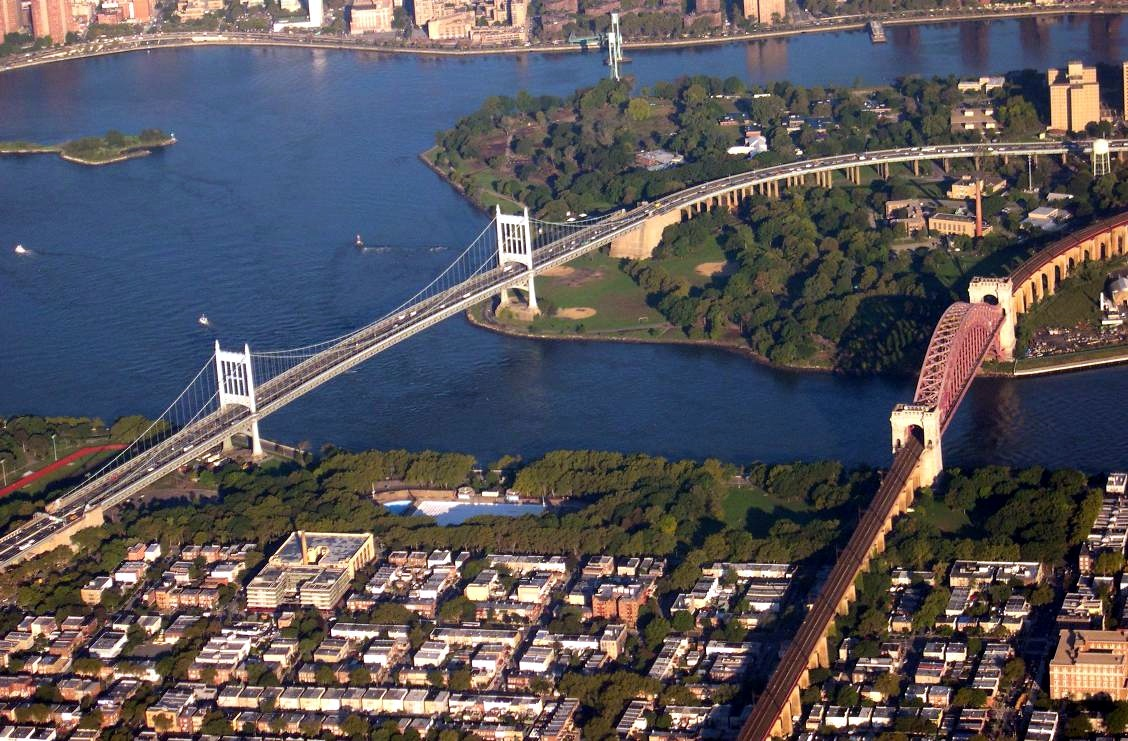
A 2004 aerial view from above Queens looking towards Wards Island, with one part of the Robert F. Kennedy Bridge (then known as the Triborough Bridge) at the left, and the Hell Gate Bridge (right). Also visible in the distance is the 103rd Street Footbridge to Manhattan.

A rail bridge between Queens and the Bronx, via Randalls Islands, was first planned in the late 19th century to link the tracks of the Pennsylvania Railroad and the New Haven Railroad. This became the Hell Gate Bridge, which was dedicated March 9, 1917. The Hell Gate Bridge includes plate girder spans across both islands, as well as a through arch bridge across Hell Gate to the southeast. The bridge also includes an inverted bowstring truss section, with four 300-foot (91 m) long spans, across Little Hell Gate.

The Triborough Bridge opened on July 11, 1936, providing a direct road connection from the then-separate islands to the rest of the city. The bridge consists of spans across the Harlem River, Hell Gate, and Bronx Kill, as well as a T-shaped viaduct that crosses the islands and connects the three spans. The bridge includes various pedestrian ramps connecting the islands with the Bronx, Manhattan, and Queens. In 2008, the Triborough Bridge was renamed after Robert F. Kennedy. The Triborough Bridge and Tunnel Authority erected an art deco administration building, which still stands on the island. The M35 bus connects the islands to Manhattan.

In May 1937, the islands were connected by a low-level bridge, carrying Central Drive over Little Hell Gate. The three-span steel arch road bridge, designed by the engineer Othmar Ammann, was northwest of the rail bridge; it measured 1,000 feet (300 m) long. The Little Hell Gate bridge was rendered obsolete when the Little Hell Gate was filled, and a service road was built alongside the deteriorating bridge. The New York City Department of Transportation proposed demolishing it in the 1990s. Despite efforts to save the bridge, it was demolished.

=== Footbridges ===
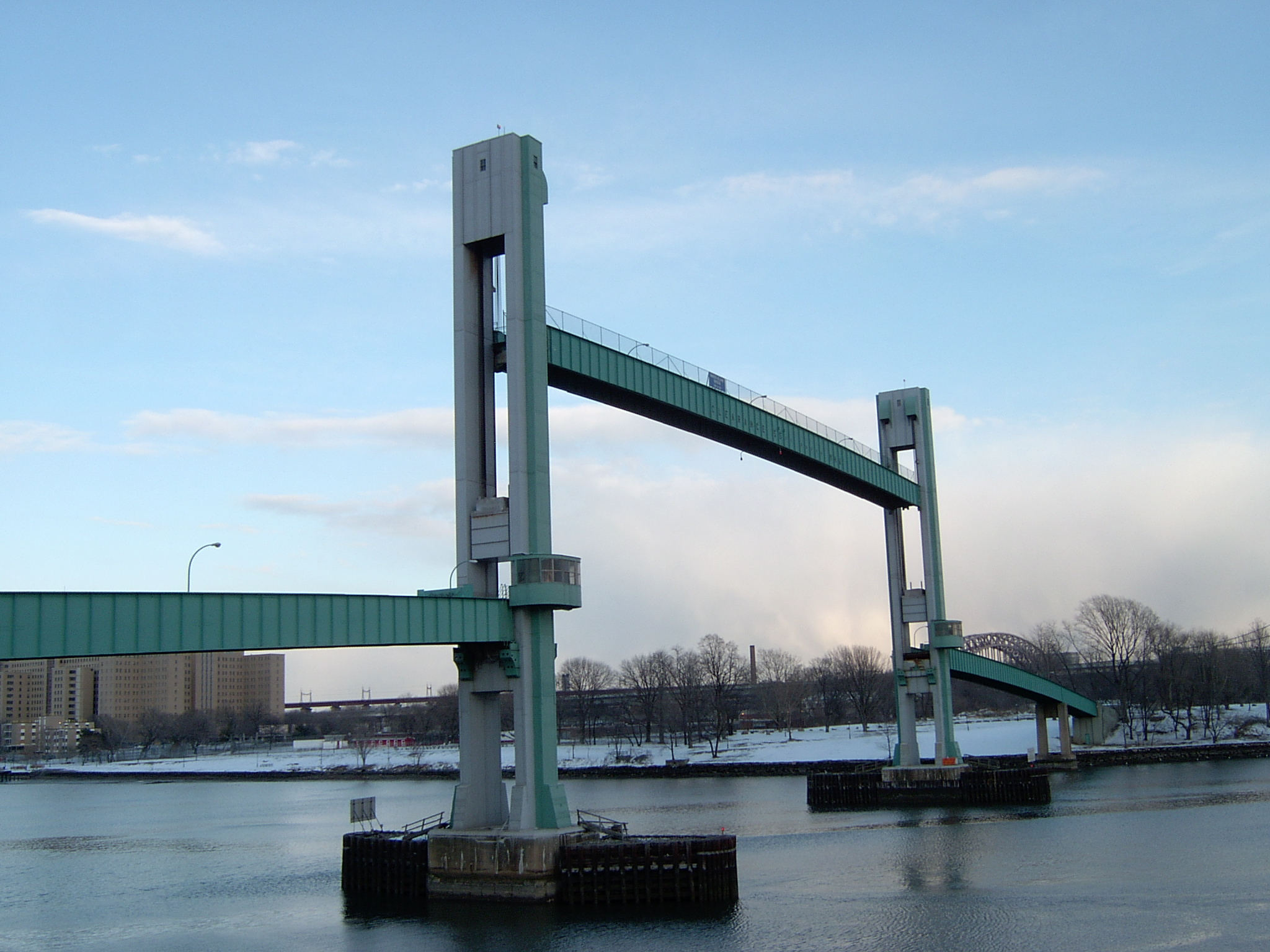
Wards Island Bridge central span in raised position, 2007

In 1937, Moses developed plans for a pedestrian bridge across the Harlem River from Manhattan to Wards Island Park, though construction of the Wards Island Bridge did not begin until October 1949. Designed by Othmar Hermann Ammann and built by the U.S. Army Corps of Engineers, the footbridge was originally known as the Harlem River Pedestrian Bridge. The bridge opened on May 18, 1951, and connects with FDR Drive and 103rd Street on Manhattan Island. It is a vertical-lift bridge with twelve spans. Since 1967, the bridge has also been open to cyclists.

A ground-level footbridge over the Bronx Kill was proposed in 2006; the footbridge, known as the Randalls Island Connector, ran under the Hell Gate Bridge. An agreement was reached in 2012, and the connector's construction commenced in 2013. The Randalls Island Connector opened in November 2015.

== See also ==
- List of New York City parks
- List of smaller islands in New York City
