= Natural Currents Energy Services =

American company

Natural Currents Energy Services, LLC is a developer and installer of hydro-electric systems. They produce scalable underwater turbines designed to capture energy from the tides of rivers and oceans. They hold Federal Energy Regulatory Commission (FERC) energy development permits at ten sites in the US, roughly 25% of the total tidal zone permits granted by FERC. The company has designed two models of turbine, the Red Hawk Tidal Power Generator and the Sea Dragon Tidal Turbine.

Natural Currents has partnered with the City College of New York to assess sites with potential for tidal power development. The 18-month study is funded by grants from the New Jersey Department of Transportation and the University Transportation Research Center.

On March 5, 2012, Natural Currents released results from a study of tidal currents off the coast of New Jersey for 2008 to 2009. The findings indicate a conservative estimate of 417 MW of potential tidal power in New Jersey, compared to the 357 MW measured by a Georgia Tech Report in 2011.

== Sources & External Links ==
- Company website
