= Self-advocacy =

Civil rights movement by and for people with developmental disabilities

Self-advocacy is the act of speaking up for oneself and one's interests. It is used as a name for civil rights movements and mutual aid networks for people with intellectual and developmental disabilities. More broadly, self-advocacy refers to having a role in directing decisions that affect one's life. Self-advocacy does not necessarily require verbal communication, complete independence, or taking on a leadership role.

The term arose in the broader civil rights movements of the 1960s and 1970s, and is part of the disability rights movement. Today, there are self-advocacy organizations across the world.

== History ==
=== Founding of the movement ===
The self-advocacy movement began in the late 1960s. Before this, most organizations were run by parents of children with developmental disabilities, such as the March of Dimes, which began in the 1950s. The first self-advocacy group originated in Sweden in the late 1960s where Dr. Bengt Nirje organized a club where people with disabilities and without could meet up, decide where they wanted to go, go on an outing and then meet to discuss their experiences. Nirje wanted to provide people with disabilities "normal" experiences in the community. Previously at this time, people with developmental disabilities were not considered able to make any decisions, including about where they wanted to go, and this program indicated a drastic departure. Nirje believed that people with developmental disabilities should be allowed to make decisions, and crucially also allowed to make mistakes, saying "To be allowed to be human means to be allowed to fail." This concept is called the dignity of risk and remains one of the central values of the self-advocacy movement. In 1968, a conference was held in Sweden as part of the normalization model where people with intellectual and developmental disabilities came together to discuss their lives, their opinions and their hopes. In 1969, the first ever training was held to teach adults with developmental disabilities how to advocate for themselves politically. One man at the training said, "...I would like to organize because I know how much our comrades at the institutional schools need help to be more respected."

In 1969, Nirje presented about these achievements to the 11th World Congress of the International Society for Rehabilitation of the Disabled, saying "This is akin to any decent revolt. Some of the retarded adults themselves definitely want to play a new role in society, to create a new image of themselves in their own eyes, in the eyes of their parents and in the eyes of the general public This struggle for respect and independence is always the normal way to obtain personal dignity and a sense of liberty and equality."

After this, other countries started to plan self-advocacy conferences. England held its first self-advocacy conference in 1972 and Canada in 1973. In the United States, self-advocates from Oregon and Washington planned their own conference held in 1974. At a meeting to plan the conference, one man, argued against the label of "mentally retarded" saying "I want to be known as a person first!" The self-advocates chose People First as a name for the conferences.

Self-advocates formed hundreds of groups around the United States and the world. Many of those groups are called People First, but have many other names. In 1990, Self Advocates Becoming Empowered (SABE), the first American national self-advocacy organization was created by self-advocates, including Roland Johnson. SABE maintains a list of self-advocacy groups in the United States.

In the UK, People First London Boroughs was founded following the attendance of a small number of people with learning disabilities (the British term for intellectual disability) at an international conference held in the US.

=== Self-advocacy and institutions ===
Many people with developmental disabilities were put in institutions as children prior to the 1970s. Doctors recommended this to parents, who often did not have the knowledge or resources to care for their children at home. Institutions were rife with abuse of all kinds. The increasing awareness of the conditions of institutions in the 1960s and 70s intensified efforts to get people with disabilities out of institutions and many of those people joined the burgeoning self-advocacy movement. Roland Johnson spent thirteen years at Pennhurst and went on to become a leader of the movement after his release.

In 1965, then-Senator Robert Kennedy visited Willowbrook, a state institution in New York with a television crew and spoke about the horrifying conditions he witnessed, calling them "snake pit[s]". In 1966, Burton Blatt and Fred Kaplan released Christmas in Purgatory, a photographic essay about the conditions inside five state institutions for developmental disabilities.

Many self-advocates, whether survivors of institutions themselves or not, see getting people with developmental disabilities out of institutions as a priority. In 1974, Terri Lee Halderman and her family sued Pennhurst State School and Hospital for multiple incidents of abuse and the violation of the residents' civil rights. This was the first federal lawsuit against a state institution. The District Court ruled that the patient's rights were violated and the institution must be closed. The institution would not close until 1987.

One of the earliest demonstrations held by self-advocates was a march on Belcherton State School in the 1980s. Many of the protesters were survivors of Belcherton. Belcherton became the first state school to be sued in 1972 when Benjamon Ricci, father of Robert Simpson Ricci, filed a class-action lawsuit claiming that the deplorable conditions violated the residents' human rights. The institution did not close until 1992.

=== Neurodiversity ===
Jim Sinclair is credited as the first person to communicate the anti-cure or autism rights perspective in the late 1980s. In 1992, Sinclair co-founded Autism Network International (ANI), which publishes newsletters "written by and for autistic people" with Donna Williams and Kathy Grant, who knew Sinclair through pen pal lists and autism conferences. The first issue of the ANI newsletter Our Voice was distributed online in November 1992 to an audience of mostly non-autistic professionals and parents of young autistic children. The number of autistic people in the organization slowly grew and ANI became a communication network for like-minded autistic people. In 1996, ANI established a yearly retreat and conference for autistic people, which was known as "Autreat" and was held in the United States. The theme of the first conference in 1996 was "Celebrating Autistic Culture" and had close to 60 participants. The success of Autreat later inspired similar autistic retreats, such as the Association for Autistic Community's conference, Autspace, in the US; Autscape in the UK; and Projekt Empowerment in Sweden.

In 1996, Martijn Dekker, an autistic computer programmer from the Netherlands, launched an email list called "Independent Living on the Autism Spectrum" (InLv). The list also welcomed those with "cousin" conditions, such as ADHD, dyslexia, and dyscalculia. American writer Harvey Blume was a member of the list; he described it as embracing "neurological pluralism" in a 1997 article in The New York Times. Blume discussed the concept of "neurological diversity" with Australian sociologist Judy Singer. The term "neurodiversity" was first published in Singer's 1998 Honours thesis and in Blume's 1998 article in The Atlantic. Blume was an early self-advocate who predicted the role the Internet would play in fostering the international neurodiversity movement.

In 2004, autistic researcher Michelle Dawson challenged applied behavior analysis (ABA) on ethical grounds. She testified in Auton v. British Columbia against the British Columbian government's mandatory funding of ABA. The same year, The New York Times covered the autism self-advocacy perspective by publishing Amy Harmon's article, "How about not 'curing' us, some autistics are pleading".

The rise of the Internet has provided more opportunities for disabled and so called "neurodivergent" people to connect and organize. Considering the geographical distance, communication and speech patterns of neurodivergent people and the domination of non-autistic and non-disabled professionals, and family members in established organizations, the Internet has provided a valuable space for self-advocates to organize and communicate. Recent research found evidence that autistic self-advocates and self-advocates with an intellectual disability are disadvantaged in many disability/autism rights organisations – tokenism is widespread. Research also shows that poverty, unpaid positions at disability organisations and lack of support are major barriers for many autistic people or people with an intellectual disability who wish to do self-advocacy.

== Values and goals ==
=== Components of self-advocacy ===
Alternative Communication in the Founders Park of the City of Rehovot, January 2025

The main page of an AAC device layout for English speakers

There is not a single unifying definition of self-advocacy, but Test and colleagues ("A Conceptual Framework of Self-Advocacy for Students with Disabilities", 2005) proposed a conceptual framework consisting of four components of self-advocacy: knowledge of self, knowledge of rights, communication, and leadership Knowledge of self refers to understanding oneself, such as one's strengths and abilities, support needs, limitations and challenges, goals and aspirations. Knowledge of rights is defined as knowing what an individual is entitled to, such as their rights and legal protections, available services and resources, choices and options. In this context communication refers to expressing one's wants and needs. Expressing one's preferences, being able to negotiate and problem-solve, and using different communication methods such as augmentative and alternative communication (AAC) devices are all examples of communication.Finally, leadership in this context means taking action and influencing change, such as setting and pursuing goals, taking responsibility and advocating for change beyond individual needs. Self-advocacy can be defined as having a role in directing the decisions that affect an individual's life.

=== Person first ===
Being a person first is a value articulated early on in the self-advocacy movement. Many people with I/DD have been dehumanized or treated as less than human throughout their lives. By saying that they are a person first, self-advocates said that they were more than just their disability and that they deserved the same rights and opportunities as people without a disability.

For this reason, many people with intellectual and developmental disabilities prefer person-first language. In person-first language, you would say "people with developmental disabilities" or "person with Down syndrome". A notable exception is autism. Even though autism is a developmental disability, the community tends to prefer identity-first language. In identity-first language, one would say "autistic people" or "autistic person".

The self-advocacy movement is also very against the use of mental retardation, retarded, or any variation of the term. In addition to it not being recognized as a medical diagnosis anymore, there is a great deal of stigma against the term. There is the "Say the Word to End the Word" campaign, which seeks to end the use of the term.

=== Self-determination ===
Self-determination is the right of all people to make their own choices. Choices were often denied to people with intellectual and developmental disabilities and still are today. People under guardianship do not get to make their own decisions about where they live and how they spend their money. Self-advocates work for the replacement of guardianship with supported decision making where people can make their own decisions, with support from friends, family or professionals.

Dignity of risk is the idea that everyone has the right to make mistakes and to take risks. It is related to self-determination, which is about the right to make choices. Many people with I/DD were stopped from making their own decisions, out of fear that they could make bad decisions, but dignity of risk says that the right to take risks and make mistakes is an essential human right. For example, a person with an intellectual disability could go to college, even if they might have trouble passing their classes.

=== Community living ===
Community living is the idea that people should live in the community and not in institutions. Institutions segregate people away from their homes, families and friends. They are also rife with abuse and neglect. People with I/DD should receive the supports that they need to live where they want to. This is also a core value of the independent living movement.

=== Equal employment and education ===
Self-advocates argue for equal opportunities in all areas of life, but especially education and employment.

==== K–12 education ====
Before the self-advocacy movement, many people with intellectual and developmental disabilities in the US were not allowed to attend school. Their families had to either keep them at home or send them to an institution. Some institutions were supposed to provide the people there with education. Institutions specifically for people with intellectual and developmental disabilities were called state schools. However, in practice, the education provide was insufficient or nonexistent. These "schools" turned into warehouses, full of abuse and neglect. In 1972, Pennsylvania Association for Retarded Citizens v. Commonwealth of Pennsylvania overturned the state law that forbid children with intellectual disabilities from attending school. It established that states had to provide a free public education for all children. Mills v. Board of Education of District of Columbia ruled that the schools must provide accommodations to students so that they can attend public school. In 1975, President Gerald Ford signed the Education for Handicapped Children Act (now known as the Individuals with Disabilities Education Act). This law entitles all children to receive a free and appropriate public education (FAPE). The law requires schools to provide students with accommodations and support to attend school. The least restrictive environment clause means that students must be, whenever possible, educated in mainstream classrooms with their non-disabled peers. Despite this, many people with intellectual and developmental disabilities are segregated in special education classrooms and not given the accommodations they need to succeed.

=== Relationship to other movements ===
The self-advocacy movement developed alongside other movements, including the civil rights movement seeing a common goal in fighting for equal treatment. John F. Kennedy, in addition to passing civil rights legislation, also assembled a President's Panel on Mental Retardation. self-advocates framed their demands using a rights-based framework. Notable cases against institutions were based on the infringement of their civil rights.

Self-advocacy developed concurrently but often separately to the independent living movement and the larger disability rights movement in the 1960s and 1970s. These movements were mostly made up of people with physical disabilities. Ed Roberts described a "hierarchy of disability" where certain disabilities were considered to rank higher than others. In these hierarchies, people with intellectual and developmental disabilities were seen as at the bottom. Bette McMuldren discussed the early independent living movement, saying "I remember even then – and I know independent living programs are still struggling with this now – we were trying to include people who had developmental disabilities, and we were trying to figure out how to do that. You know, certainly there were people who had cerebral palsy. There were a lot of people who had cerebral palsy. People with mental retardation never really got incorporated. But there was always talk about how to build coalitions and how were we going to make that happen."

== Organizations supporting self-advocacy ==
=== Autistic Self-Advocacy Network ===
Logo of the Autistic Self Advocacy Network

The Autistic Self Advocacy Network (ASAN) is a 501(c)(3) organization run by autistic adults in the United States, based in Washington, D.C.. ASAN seeks to advance the principles of the Disability rights movement within the Autistic community. The organization also works to ensure autistic people are included in policymaking. ASAN maintains a resource library and supports community organizing and Self-advocacy. It also offers webinars and trainings.

=== The International Association for Spelling as Communication (I-ASC) ===
The International Association for Spelling as Communication (I-ASC) is a global 501(c)(3) organization serving the needs of the nonspeaking and Neurodivergent community. The goal of I-ASC is to make spelling and relevant support accessible to everyone who is unable to use speech as a reliable means of communication. The organization aims to make these supports accessible regardless of geography, age, socioeconomic or educational status.

Some of the supports It offers include: Spelling to Communicate (S2C™) practitioner training, educational resources, and advocacy. I-ASC has a nonspeaking leadership counsel, which is a group of nonspeaking adults who provide guidance to the organization's board, staff, and practitioner leadership.
