= Joseph Cornelius Waddy =

American judge (1911–1978)

Judge of the United States District Court for the District of Columbia
- In office March 4, 1967 – August 1, 1978
- Appointed by: Lyndon B. Johnson
- Preceded by: Richmond Bowling Keech
- Succeeded by: John Garrett Penn

Personal details
- Born: Joseph Cornelius Waddy; May 26, 1911 Louisa County, Virginia
- Died: August 1, 1978 (aged 67) Washington, D.C.
- Education: Lincoln University (A.B.); Howard University School of Law (LL.B.)

Joseph Cornelius Waddy (May 26, 1911 – August 1, 1978) was a United States district judge of the United States District Court for the District of Columbia from 1967 to his death in 1978.

== Early and family life ==
Waddy was born on May 26, 1911, in Louisa County, Virginia. Waddy moved to Alexandria, Virginia in 1928 when he was seventeen years old. In 1938, he won an oratorical contest on the American Negro's constitutional rights, sponsored by the Improved Benevolent Protective Order of Elks of the World. After his family moved across the Potomac River to Washington, D.C., he graduated from Dunbar High School. In 1935 Waddy graduated with honors, receiving an Artium Baccalaureus degree from Lincoln University, Pennsylvania. After an additional three years of study, he received a Bachelor of Laws from Howard University School of Law, graduating at the top of his class. He married Elizabeth H. Hardy and they had a son, Joseph C. Waddy Jr.

== Career ==
After passing the District of Columbia bar exam and admission to that bar, Waddy began private practice with the law firm of Charles Hamilton Houston, known for his tireless civil rights practice. Waddy remained in private practice in Washington, D.C., from 1939 to 1962, except from 1944 to 1946, when he served in the United States Army, rising to the rank of staff sergeant. After returning from World War II, Waddy was a partner in the law firm of Houston, Waddy, Bryant and Gardner. Among the most important civil rights cases he helped litigate were Steele v. Louisville & Nashville Railroad Co., 323 U.S. 192 (1944) and Conley v. Gibson, 355 U.S. 41 (1957). Waddy served on the Citizens Advisory Council to the District of Columbia Commissioners from 1958 to 1962, and as an adjunct professor at the Howard University School of Law from 1966 to 1967. In 1962, Waddy was appointed to the municipal court for the District of Columbia in the domestic relations branch.

== Federal judicial service ==
Waddy was nominated by President Lyndon B. Johnson on January 16, 1967, to a seat on the United States District Court for the District of Columbia vacated by Judge Richmond Bowling Keech. He was confirmed by the United States Senate on March 2, 1967, and received his commission on March 4, 1967. His service terminated on August 1, 1978, due to his death.

=== Notable cases ===
Several cases which Waddy handled improved education in local schools (although he once was forced to hold the mayor in contempt of court), liberalizing abortion restrictions, and speeding the city's process for reissuing lost or stolen welfare checks. Waddy presided over Mills v. Board of Education of District of Columbia, an early case recognizing that disabled children could not constitutionally be excluded from public education. Together with the decision in Pennsylvania Association for Retarded Children (PARC) v. Commonwealth of Pennsylvania, Waddy's opinion in Mills prompted the United States Congress to pass legislation now known as the Individuals with Disabilities Education Act. In addition to his federal judicial duties, beginning in 1971, Waddy served as Commissioner for the National Conference of Commissioners on Uniform State Laws.

On July 24, 1973, U.S. District Judge Joseph C. Waddy ordered the Finance Committee to Re-elect the President to make public “a complete and accurate” account of its receipts and expenditures in the 15-month period before the new election campaign financing law took effect April 7, 1972. The order was the result of a lawsuit filed Sept. 6, 1972, by Common Cause, the “citizens' lobby.” The judge told the finance committee to release the information by Sept. 28. (Earlier action, May 4).

== Death ==
Waddy died at Washington Hospital Center on August 1, 1978, of emphysema and a heart disorder.

== See also ==
- List of African-American federal judges
- List of African-American jurists

== Sources ==
Legal offices
Preceded by Richmond Bowling Keech	Judge of the United States District Court for the District of Columbia; 1967–1978	Succeeded by John Garrett Penn
