= Matthew McGuire =

Matthew McGuire may refer to:

- Matthew Francis McGuire (1898–1986), a United States federal judge
- Matthew McGuire, member of the band The Exploited
- Matthew "Matt" McGuire (played by Jake Thomas), the fictional little brother of Lizzie McGuire
- Matthew “Matt” McGuire, known for being the drummer and the touring music director for American DJs The Chainsmokers, born 1993
