= Self Advocates Becoming Empowered =

American disability rights organization

- Formation: 1990
- Purpose: Self-advocacy by people with developmental disabilities
- Headquarters: Ohio
- Website: https://www.sabeusa.org/

Self Advocates Becoming Empowered (SABE) is an American 501(c)(3) non-profit organization made up of self-advocates from every US state. The organization works on issues that are important to people with developmental disabilities including closing institutions and voting, and provides support to local self-advocacy organizations.

== History ==
SABE was founded in 1990 as the first national self-advocacy organization. Founding members include Nancy Ward, Roland Johnson, Tia Nelis, and others. While the organization was founded in 1990, they did not achieve 501(c)(3) status until the mid-1990s.

In 1990, self-advocates discussed the possibility of forming a national organization. Regional representatives were chosen to form a steering committee that would create a plan for an organization. In 1992, self-advocates met at the Second People First Conference in Nashville, where the attendees voted for board members and the organization was formed. In 1994, SABE released their first position statement, which discussed community living and deinstitutionalization.

By 1996, SABE was assisting local self-advocacy groups to plan national conferences. In 1996, a conference held by People First of Oklahoma and SABE had over 850 attendees. Also in 1996, SABE launched the "Close the Doors Campaign for Freedom" which was devoted to closing institutions.

== Projects ==
Self Advocacy Resource and Technical Assistance Center (SARTAC) is a resource center for self-advocacy groups across the United States. SABE created this project, working in partnership with the Autistic Self Advocacy Network, Green Mountain Self Advocates, National Association of Councils on Developmental Disabilities (NACDD), Sibling Leadership Network (SLN), Southwest Institute for Families and Children (SWI), TASH, and University of Missouri Kansas City Institute for Human Development (UMKC). SARTAC began in September 2016 with a five-year grant from the Administration on Intellectual and Developmental Disabilities.

SABE also runs the GoVoter Project, which seeks to increase voter turnout among people with disabilities. They provide training and resources to self-advocacy groups about how to vote, and do a survey each election about barriers that people with disabilities face when voting. The training covers how to register to vote and how to get accommodations while voting. While the Americans with Disabilities Act bans discrimination against people with disabilities, including the denial of a citizen's right to vote, many people with developmental disabilities are denied the right to vote. The Go Voter Project works to educate people about their rights and what to do if they experience barriers while voting.
