= Chief Justice of the United States =

Chief judicial officer of the United States

- Seal of the Supreme Court

- Flag of the Supreme Court

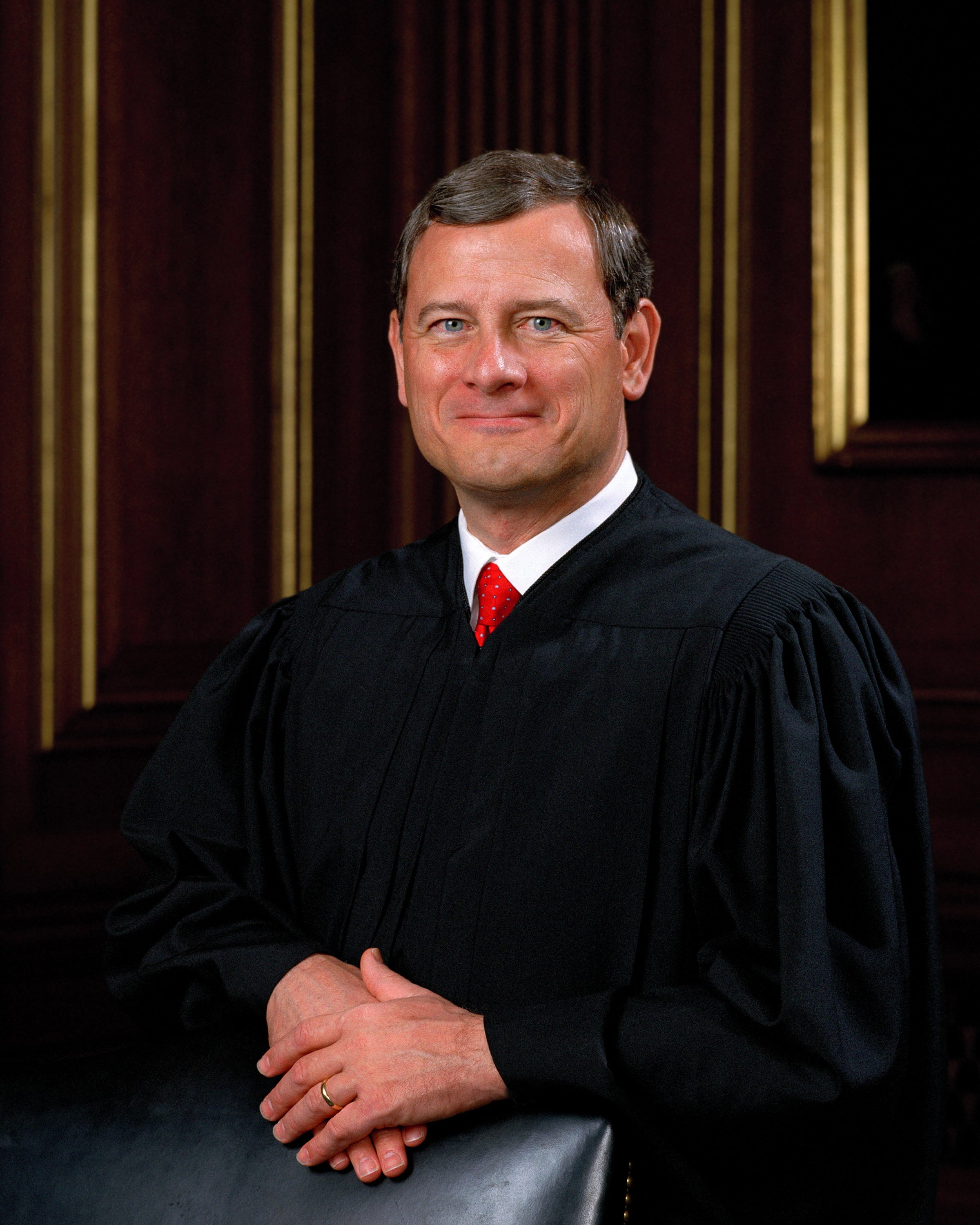
- Incumbent; John Roberts since September 29, 2005
- Supreme Court of the United States
- Style: Mr. Chief Justice (informal); Your Honor (within court); The Honorable (formal)
- Type: Chief justice
- Member of: Federal judiciary Judicial Conference; Administrative Office of the Courts
- Seat: Supreme Court Building, Washington, D.C.
- Appointer: The president; with Senate advice and consent
- Term length: Life tenure
- Constituting instrument: Constitution of the United States
- Formation: March 4, 1789 (237 years ago)
- First holder: John Jay
- Salary: $320,700 USD

The chief justice of the United States is the chief judge of the Supreme Court of the United States and is the highest-ranking officer of the federal judiciary. Article II, Section 2, Clause 2 of the Constitution grants plenary power to the president to nominate, and, with the advice and consent of the Senate, appoint "Judges of the Supreme Court", who serve until they die, resign, retire, or are impeached and convicted. The existence of a chief justice is only explicit in Article I, Section 3, Clause 6 which states that the chief justice shall preside over the impeachment trial of the president; this has occurred three times, for Andrew Johnson, Bill Clinton, and for Donald Trump's first impeachment.

The chief justice has significant influence in the selection of cases for review, presides when oral arguments are held, and leads the discussion of cases among the justices. Additionally, when the court renders an opinion, the chief justice, if in the majority, chooses who writes the court's opinion; however, when deciding a case, the chief justice's vote counts no more than that of any other justice.

While nowhere mandated, the presidential oath of office is traditionally administered by the chief justice. The chief justice serves as a spokesperson for the federal government's judicial branch and acts as a chief administrative officer for the federal courts. The chief justice presides over the Judicial Conference and, in that capacity, appoints the director and deputy director of the Administrative Office. The chief justice is an ex officio member of the Board of Regents of the Smithsonian Institution and, by custom, is elected chancellor of the board.

Since the Supreme Court was established in 1789, 17 people have served as Chief Justice, beginning with John Jay (1789–1795). The current chief justice is John Roberts (since 2005). Five of the 17 chief justices—John Rutledge, Edward Douglass White, Charles Evans Hughes, Harlan Fiske Stone, and William Rehnquist—served as associate justices before becoming chief justice. Additionally, Chief Justice William Howard Taft had previously served as president.

== Origin, title and appointment ==
The United States Constitution does not explicitly establish an office of the Chief Justice but presupposes its existence with a single reference in Article I, Section 3, Clause 6: "When the President of the United States is tried, the Chief Justice shall preside." Nothing more is said in the Constitution regarding the office. Article III, Section 1, which authorizes the establishment of the Supreme Court, refers to all members of the court simply as "judges". The Judiciary Act of 1789 created the distinctive titles of Chief Justice of the Supreme Court of the United States and Associate Justice of the Supreme Court of the United States.

In 1866, Salmon P. Chase assumed the title of Chief Justice of the United States, and Congress began using the new title in subsequent legislation. The first person whose Supreme Court commission contained the modified title was Melville Fuller in 1888. The associate justice title was not altered in 1866 and remains as originally created.

The chief justice, like all federal judges, is nominated by the president and confirmed to office by the U.S. Senate. Article III, Section 1 of the Constitution specifies that they "shall hold their Offices during good Behavior." This language has been interpreted to mean that judicial appointments are effectively for life and that once in office, a justice's tenure ends only when the justice dies, retires, resigns, or is removed from office through the impeachment process. Since 1789, 15 presidents have made a total of 22 official nominations to the position of chief justice.

The salary of the chief justice is set by Congress; as of 2026, the annual salary is $320,700, which is slightly higher than that of associate justices, which is $306,600. The practice of appointing an individual to serve as Chief Justice is grounded in tradition; while the Constitution mandates that there be a chief justice, it is silent on the subject of how one is chosen and by whom. There is no specific constitutional prohibition against using another method to select the chief justice from among those justices properly appointed and confirmed to the Supreme Court.

Three incumbent associate justices have been nominated by the president and confirmed by the Senate as Chief Justice: Edward Douglass White in 1910, Harlan Fiske Stone in 1941, and William Rehnquist in 1986. A fourth, Abe Fortas, was nominated to the position in 1968 but was not confirmed. As an associate justice does not have to resign their seat on the court in order to be nominated as Chief Justice, Fortas remained an associate justice. Similarly, when Associate Justice William Cushing was nominated and confirmed as Chief Justice in January 1796 but declined the office, he too remained on the court. Two former associate justices subsequently returned to service on the court as Chief Justice. John Rutledge was the first. President Washington gave him a recess appointment in 1795. However, his subsequent nomination to the office was not confirmed by the Senate, and he left office and the court. In 1930, former associate justice Charles Evans Hughes was confirmed as Chief Justice. Additionally, in December 1800, former chief justice John Jay was nominated and confirmed to the position a second time but ultimately declined it, opening the way for the appointment of John Marshall.

== Powers and duties ==
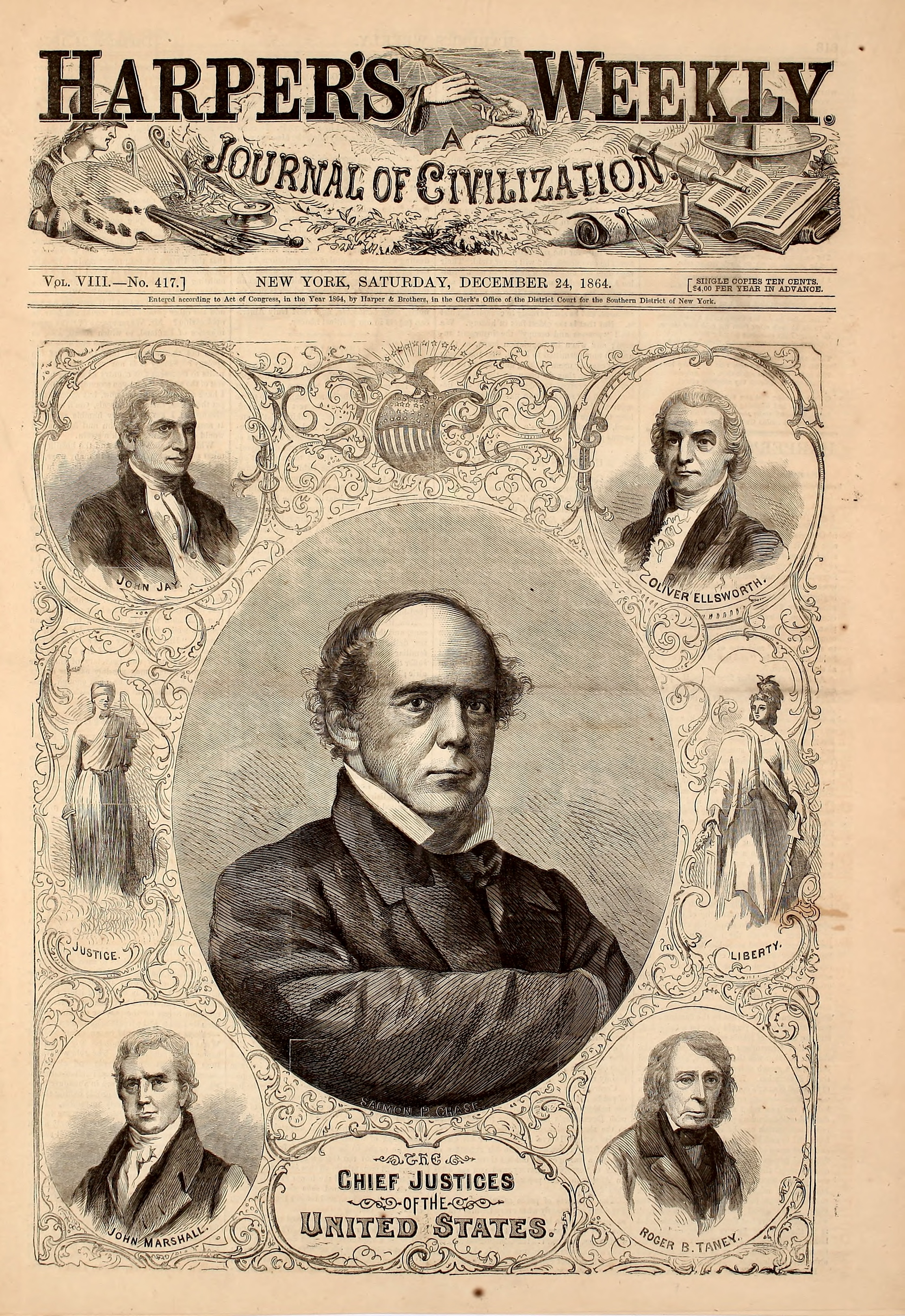
Chief Justices of the United States (Harper's Weekly, December 24, 1864)

Along with their general responsibilities as a member of the Supreme Court, the chief justice has several unique duties to fulfill.

=== Impeachment trials ===
Article I, Section 3 of the U.S. Constitution stipulates that the chief justice shall preside over the Senate trial of an impeached president of the United States. Three chief justices have presided over presidential impeachment trials: Salmon P. Chase (1868 trial of Andrew Johnson), William Rehnquist (1999 trial of Bill Clinton), and John Roberts (2020 trial of Donald Trump; Roberts declined to preside over Trump's second trial in 2021, which took place after the end of Trump's presidency. Senate president pro-tempore Patrick Leahy presided). All three presidents were acquitted in the Senate. Although the Constitution is silent on the matter, the chief justice would, under Senate rules adopted in 1999 before the Clinton trial, preside over the trial of an impeached vice president. This rule was established to preclude the possibility of a vice president presiding over their own trial.

=== Seniority ===
Many of the court's procedures and inner workings are governed by the rules of protocol based on the seniority of the justices. The chief justice always ranks first in the order of precedence—regardless of the length of the officeholder's service (even if shorter than that of one or more associate justices). This elevated status has enabled successive chief justices to define and refine both the court's culture and its judicial priorities.

The chief justice sets the agenda for the weekly meetings where the justices review the petitions for certiorari, to decide whether to hear or deny each case. The Supreme Court agrees to hear less than one percent of the cases petitioned to it. While associate justices may append items to the weekly agenda, in practice this initial agenda-setting power of the chief justice has significant influence over the direction of the court. Nonetheless, a chief justice's influence may be limited by circumstances and the associate justices' understanding of legal principles; it is definitely limited by the fact that they have only a single vote of nine on the decision whether to grant or deny certiorari.

Despite the chief justice's elevated stature, their vote carries the same legal weight as the vote of each associate justice. Additionally, they have no legal authority to overrule the verdicts or interpretations of the other eight judges or tamper with them. The task of assigning who shall write the opinion for the majority falls to the most senior justice in the majority. Thus, when the chief justice is in the majority, they always assign the opinion. Early in his tenure, Chief Justice John Marshall insisted upon holdings which the justices could unanimously back as a means to establish and build the court's national prestige. In doing so, Marshall would often write the opinions himself and actively discouraged dissenting opinions. Associate Justice William Johnson eventually persuaded Marshall and the rest of the court to adopt its present practice: one justice writes an opinion for the majority, and the rest are free to write their own separate opinions or not, whether concurring or dissenting.

The chief justice's formal prerogative—when in the majority—to assign which justice will write the court's opinion is perhaps their most influential power, as this enables them to influence the historical record. They may assign this task to the individual justice best able to hold together a fragile coalition, to an ideologically amenable colleague, or to themselves. Opinion authors can have a large influence on the content of an opinion; two justices in the same majority, given the opportunity, might write very different majority opinions. A chief justice who knows the associate justices well can therefore do much—by the simple act of selecting the justice who writes the opinion of the court—to affect the general character or tone of an opinion, which in turn can affect the interpretation of that opinion in cases before lower courts in the years to come.

The chief justice chairs the conferences where cases are discussed and tentatively voted on by the justices. They normally speak first and so have influence in framing the discussion. Although the chief justice votes first—the court votes in order of seniority—they may strategically pass in order to ensure membership in the majority if desired. It is reported that:

Chief Justice Warren Burger was renowned, and even vilified in some quarters, for voting strategically during conference discussions on the Supreme Court in order to control the Court's agenda through opinion assignment. Indeed, Burger is said to have often changed votes to join the majority coalition, cast "phony votes" by voting against his preferred position, and declined to express a position at conference.

=== Presidential oath ===
The chief justice has traditionally administered the presidential oath of office to new U.S. presidents. This is merely custom, and is not a constitutional responsibility of the chief justice. The Constitution does not require that the presidential oath be administered by anyone in particular, simply that it be taken by the president. Law empowers any federal or state judge, as well as notaries public, to administer oaths and affirmations. The chief justice ordinarily administers the oath of office to newly appointed and confirmed associate justices, whereas the seniormost associate justice will normally swear in a new chief justice.

If the chief justice is ill or incapacitated, the oath is usually administered by the seniormost member of the Supreme Court. Eight times, someone other than the chief justice of the United States administered the oath of office to the president.

- Robert Livingston, as chancellor of the state of New York (the state's highest ranking judicial office), administered the oath of office to George Washington at his first inauguration; there was no chief justice of the United States, nor any other federal judge before their appointments by President Washington in the months following his inauguration.
- William Cushing, an associate justice of the Supreme Court, administered Washington's second oath of office in 1793.
- John Calvin Coolidge Sr., Calvin Coolidge's father, a notary public, administered the oath to his son after the death of Warren Harding. This, however, was contested upon Coolidge's return to Washington, and his oath was re-administered by Judge Adolph A. Hoehling, Jr. of the United States District Court for the District of Columbia.
- John Tyler and Millard Fillmore were both sworn in on the death of their predecessors by Chief Judge William Cranch of the Circuit Court of the District of Columbia.
- Chester A. Arthur and Theodore Roosevelt's initial oaths reflected the unexpected nature of their taking office.
- On November 22, 1963, after the assassination of President John F. Kennedy, Judge Sarah T. Hughes, a federal district court judge of the United States District Court for the Northern District of Texas, administered the oath to Lyndon B. Johnson aboard Air Force One.

=== Other duties ===
Since the tenure of William Howard Taft, the office of chief justice has moved beyond just first among equals. The chief justice also:

- Serves as the head of the federal judiciary.
- Serves as the head of the Judicial Conference of the United States, the chief administrative body of the United States federal courts. The Judicial Conference is empowered by the Rules Enabling Act to propose rules, which are then promulgated by the Supreme Court (subject to disapproval by Congress under the Congressional Review Act), to ensure the smooth operation of the federal courts. Major portions of the Federal Rules of Civil Procedure and Federal Rules of Evidence have been adopted by most state legislatures and are considered canonical by American law schools.
- Appoints sitting federal judges to the membership of the United States Foreign Intelligence Surveillance Court and its appellate counterpart, the United States Foreign Intelligence Surveillance Court of Review. The United States Foreign Intelligence Surveillance Court is a "secret court" which oversees requests for surveillance warrants by federal police agencies (primarily the FBI) against suspected foreign intelligence agents inside the United States (see 50 U.S.C. § 1803), and also adopts security measures for maintaining records of section 702 proceedings (see 50 U.S.C. § 1881).
- Appoints sitting federal judges to the membership of the United States Alien Terrorist Removal Court, a special court constituted to determine whether aliens should be deported from the United States on the grounds that they are terrorists.
- Appoints the members of the Judicial Panel on Multidistrict Litigation, a special tribunal of seven sitting federal judges responsible for selecting the venue for coordinated pretrial proceedings in situations where multiple related federal actions have been filed in different judicial districts.
- Serves as an ex officio member of the Board of Regents and as the chancellor of the Smithsonian Institution.
- Supervises the acquisition of books for the Law Library of the Library of Congress.

Unlike Senators and Representatives, who are constitutionally prohibited from holding any other "office of trust or profit" of the United States or of any state while holding their congressional seats, the chief justice and the other members of the federal judiciary are not barred from serving in other positions. John Jay served as a diplomat to negotiate the Jay Treaty, and Earl Warren chaired the President's Commission on the Assassination of President Kennedy.

=== Disability or vacancy ===
Under 28 U.S.C. § 3, when the chief justice is unable to discharge their functions, or when that office is vacant, the chief justice's duties are carried out by the senior associate justice until the disability or vacancy ends. For example, when Chief Justice Earl Warren traveled abroad in 1968, senior Associate Justice Hugo Black served as acting Chief Justice in his absence.; and when William Rehnquist was ill in 2004, John Paul Stevens acted in his stead, presiding over oral arguments.

Currently, Clarence Thomas is the senior associate justice.

== List of chief justices ==
Since the Supreme Court was established in 1789, the following 17 men have served as chief justice:

#	Name	Confirmation Vote Date	Term (Note: The start date given here for each chief justice is the day that person took the oath of office, and the end date is the day of the justice's death, resignation, or retirement.)	Duration	Appointer	Prior Position (Note: Listed here (unless otherwise noted) is the position—either with a U.S. state or the federal government—held by the individual immediately before becoming Chief Justice of the United States.)
1	John Jay (1745–1829)	September 26, 1789 (Acclamation)	October 19, 1789 – June 29, 1795 (Resigned)	5 years, 253 days	George Washington	Acting United States Secretary of State (1789–1790)
2	John Rutledge (1739–1800)	December 15, 1795 (10–14) (Note: This was the first Supreme Court nomination to be rejected by the United States Senate. Rutledge remains the only "recess appointed" justice not to be subsequently confirmed by the Senate.)	August 12, 1795 (Note: Recess appointment. Note: The date on which the justice took the judicial oath is here used as the date of the beginning of their service, not the date of the recess appointment.) – December 28, 1795 (Resigned, nomination having been rejected)	138 days	George Washington	Chief Justice of the South Carolina Court of Common Pleas and Sessions (1791–1795); Associate Justice of the Supreme Court (1789–1791)
3	Oliver Ellsworth (1745–1807)	March 4, 1796 (21–1)	March 8, 1796 – December 15, 1800 (Resigned)	4 years, 282 days	George Washington	United States Senator from Connecticut (1789–1796)
4	John Marshall (1755–1835)	January 27, 1801 (Acclamation)	February 4, 1801 – July 6, 1835 (Died)	34 years, 152 days	John Adams	United States Secretary of State (1800–1801)
5	Roger B. Taney (1777–1864)	March 15, 1836 (29–15)	March 28, 1836 – October 12, 1864 (Died)	28 years, 198 days	Andrew Jackson	United States Secretary of the Treasury (1833–1834)
6	Salmon P. Chase (1808–1873)	December 6, 1864 (Acclamation)	December 15, 1864 – May 7, 1873 (Died)	8 years, 143 days	Abraham Lincoln	United States Secretary of the Treasury (1861–1864)
7	Morrison Waite (1816–1888)	January 21, 1874 (63–0)	March 4, 1874 – March 23, 1888 (Died)	14 years, 19 days	Ulysses S. Grant	Ohio State Senator (1849–1850); Presiding Officer of the Ohio constitutional convention (1873)
8	Melville Fuller (1833–1910)	July 20, 1888 (41–20)	October 8, 1888 – July 4, 1910 (Died)	21 years, 269 days	Grover Cleveland	President of the Illinois State Bar Association (1886); Illinois State Representative (1863–1865)
9	Edward Douglass White (1845–1921)	December 12, 1910 (Note: Elevated from associate justice to chief justice while serving on the Supreme Court. The nomination of a sitting associate justice to be chief justice is subject to a separate confirmation process.) (Acclamation)	December 19, 1910 – May 19, 1921 (Died)	10 years, 151 days	William Howard Taft	Associate Justice of the Supreme Court (1894–1910)
10	William Howard Taft (1857–1930)	June 30, 1921 (Acclamation)	July 11, 1921 – February 3, 1930 (Resigned)	8 years, 207 days	Warren G. Harding	President of the United States (1909–1913)
11	Charles Evans Hughes (1862–1948)	February 13, 1930 (52–26)	February 24, 1930 – June 30, 1941 (Retired)	11 years, 126 days	Herbert Hoover	United States Secretary of State (1921–1925); Associate Justice of the Supreme Court (1910–1916)
12	Harlan F. Stone (1872–1946)	June 27, 1941 (Acclamation)	July 3, 1941 – April 22, 1946 (Died)	4 years, 293 days	Franklin D. Roosevelt	Associate Justice of the Supreme Court (1925–1941)
13	Fred M. Vinson (1890–1953)	June 20, 1946 (Acclamation)	June 24, 1946 – September 8, 1953 (Died)	7 years, 76 days	Harry S. Truman	United States Secretary of the Treasury (1945–1946)
14	Earl Warren (1891–1974)	March 1, 1954 (Acclamation)	October 5, 1953 – June 23, 1969 (Retired)	15 years, 261 days	Dwight D. Eisenhower	Governor of California (1943–1953)
15	Warren E. Burger (1907–1995)	June 9, 1969 (74–3)	June 23, 1969 – September 26, 1986 (Retired)	17 years, 95 days	Richard Nixon	Judge of the United States Court of Appeals for the District of Columbia Circuit (1956–1969)
16	William Rehnquist (1924–2005)	September 17, 1986 (65–33)	September 26, 1986 – September 3, 2005 (Died)	18 years, 342 days	Ronald Reagan	Associate Justice of the Supreme Court (1972–1986)
17	John Roberts (born 1955)	September 29, 2005 (78–22)	September 29, 2005 – present	21 years, 33 days	George W. Bush	Judge of the United States Court of Appeals for the District of Columbia Circuit (2003–2005)
