= Roland Johnson =

American disabled rights activist (1945–1994)

- Born: 14 September 1945; Philadelphia, Pennsylvania
- Died: 28 August 1994 (aged 48); Philadelphia, Pennsylvania
- Occupation: Disability rights activist
- Known for: leader in the early Self-advocacy movement; former Pennhurst resident
- Notable work: Lost in a Desert World: An Autobiography (1999)

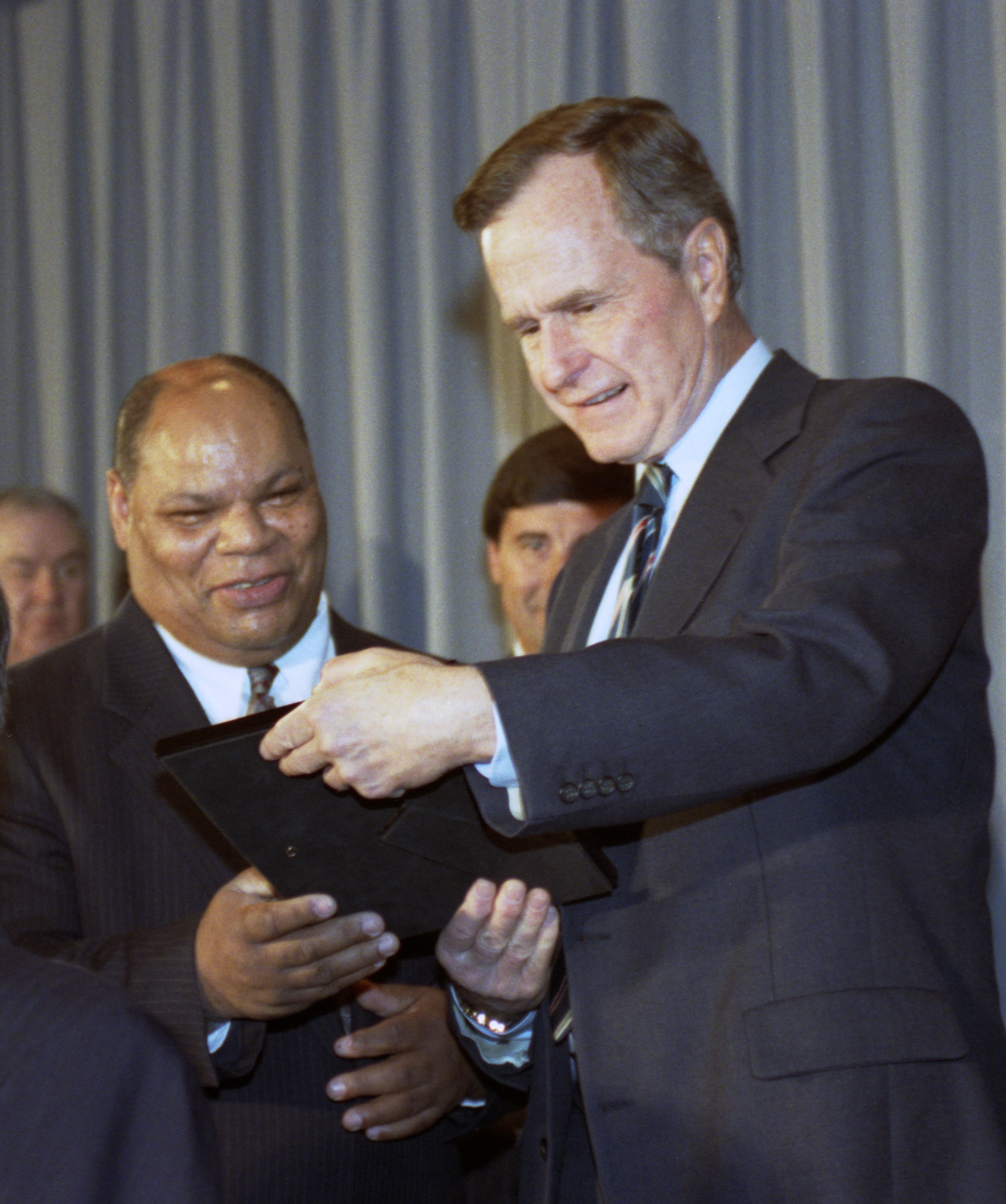
Johnson presenting President George Bush with an award in recognition of his enacting the Americans with Disabilities Act of 1990, January 12, 1993

Roland Johnson (1945 – 1994) was an advocate for the rights of people with disabilities. He was one of the founders of Self Advocates Becoming Empowered (S.A.B.E.), and one of the first chapter presidents of Speaking For Ourselves. He spent 13 years institutionalized at Pennhurst State School and Hospital, until he was released in 1971 following the civil rights case, Halderman v. Pennhurst State School and Hospital.

== Childhood ==
Johnson was born 14 September 1945. He was the youngest of nine children – six girls and three boys. He was born a twin but his twin sibling died in infancy. The Johnson family lived in a three-bedroom house, first on Ellsworth Street across from the Christian Union Church in South Philadelphia, then later on North Cleveland Street in North Philadelphia.

Johnson's mother worked as a housekeeper and his father as an auto mechanic. Vera, the oldest child, was often in charge of the house, watching the younger siblings, preparing meals and making sure the chores got done.

As a child, Johnson stayed at home because public schools were unable or unwilling to accommodate him. He often stole food from stores due to his insatiable appetite. To punish him, his mother would heat a knife on the stove and burn his hand with it. It became clear that the family was unable to care for a disabled child, so they decided to send him to Pennhurst.

== Pennhurst ==
In 1958, when Johnson was 13 years old, his mother consulted with other family members and decided that she was no longer capable of handling Johnson's growing discipline problems. They decided to commit him to Pennhurst State School and Hospital, where he would live for the next 13 years, until he was released in 1971 at the age of 26.

== Advocacy ==
After his release from Pennhurst, he went through a difficult transition back to the outside world. After a series of illnesses, he joined a psychiatric day program that helped improve his life. In the early 1980s, Johnson became involved with a self-advocacy organization called Speaking for Ourselves, and became one of the first board members and the first president of the Philadelphia chapter.

In 1990 Johnson became one of two representatives from the Northeast to the National Steering Committee on Self Advocacy, which in August 1991 became the board of directors of Self Advocates Becoming Empowered (S.A.B.E.)

== Death ==
Johnson died August 29, 1994, at the age of 48, in a house fire.

== Lost in a Desert World ==
Johnson told his autobiography as an oral history in a series of audio recordings made by Karl Williams. It was published posthumously in 1999 as Lost in a Desert World.

== Bibliography ==
- Downey, Dennis B.; Conroy, James W., eds. (2020). Pennhurst and the Struggle for Disability Rights. Pennsylvania: Keystone Books. ISBN 978-0271086033.
- Downey, Dennis B. (25 August 2024). "Remembering a Pennhurst Survivor Who Became 'the MLK of the Disability Rights Movement'". Philadelphia Inquirer. Philadelphia, Penn.
- Friedman, Mark; Beckwith, Ruthie-Marie (2014). "Self-Advocacy: The Emancipation Movement Led by People with Intellectual and Developmental Disabilities". In Ben-Moshe, Liat; Chapman, Chris; Carey, Allison C. (eds.). Disability Incarcerated. Palgrave Macmillan. pp. 237–254. doi:10.1057/9781137388476_13. ISBN 978-1-137-40405-3.
- Johnson, Roland (1994). Lost in a Desert World: The Autobiography of Roland Johnson. as told to Karl Williams. Philadelphia, Penn.: Speaking for Ourselves. ISBN 0-9672256-0-4.
- Obermayer, Liz; Perske, Robert; Probst, Melissa (December 2000). "Book Reviews: Lost in a Desert World: An Autobiography". Mental Retardation. 38 (6). American Association on Intellectual and Developmental Disabilities: 539–546. doi:10.1352/0047-6765(2000)038<0539:BR>2.0.CO;2.
- Rifkin, Glenn (31 July 2020). "Overlooked No More: Roland Johnson, Who Fought to Shut Down Institutions for the Disabled". The New York Times.
- Wallace, Andy (31 August 1994). "Obituary: Roland Johnson, 48; Advocate Fought For Rights Of The Disabled". Philadelphia Inquirer. Philadelphia, Penn. Archived from the original on September 21, 2015.
