= Truman A. Morrison III =

American judge

Senior Judge of the Superior Court of the District of Columbia
- In office 1999–2020

Judge of the Superior Court of the District of Columbia
- In office 1979–1999
- Appointed by: Jimmy Carter
- Preceded by: John Garrett Penn
- Succeeded by: John McAdam Mott

Personal details
- Born: Truman A. Morrison III; December 10, 1943 (age 82) Chicago, Illinois
- Education: Beloit College (BA); University of Wisconsin (JD)

Truman A. Morrison III (born December 10, 1943) is a former attorney and judge and served on the Superior Court of the District of Columbia from 1979 to 2020. He was known for his advocacy for criminal justice reform including bail reform. Morrison unexpectedly resigned in 2020, amid a Washington Post investigation that surfaced allegations of sexual assault and light sentencing of sexual predators.

Morrison received his Bachelor of Arts in government and sociology from Beloit College in 1967 and his Juris Doctor from the University of Wisconsin Law School in 1970.

Morrison attained senior status in 1999. President Jimmy Carter appointed Morrison to the Superior Court in 1979. to fill the seat vacated by Judge John Garrett Penn. Morrison was the subject of Canary: The Washington Post Investigates, a seven-part podcast produced by The Washington Post that reported on allegations he sexually assaulted a 16-year-old girl when he was in his early 30s. Morrison retired three days after being contacted by investigative reporter Amy Brittain regarding the charges.

== Personal life ==
Morrison is married to Susan Shaffer and their sons are country musicians with The Morrison Brothers Band.
