= David Andrew Pine =

American judge (1891–1970)

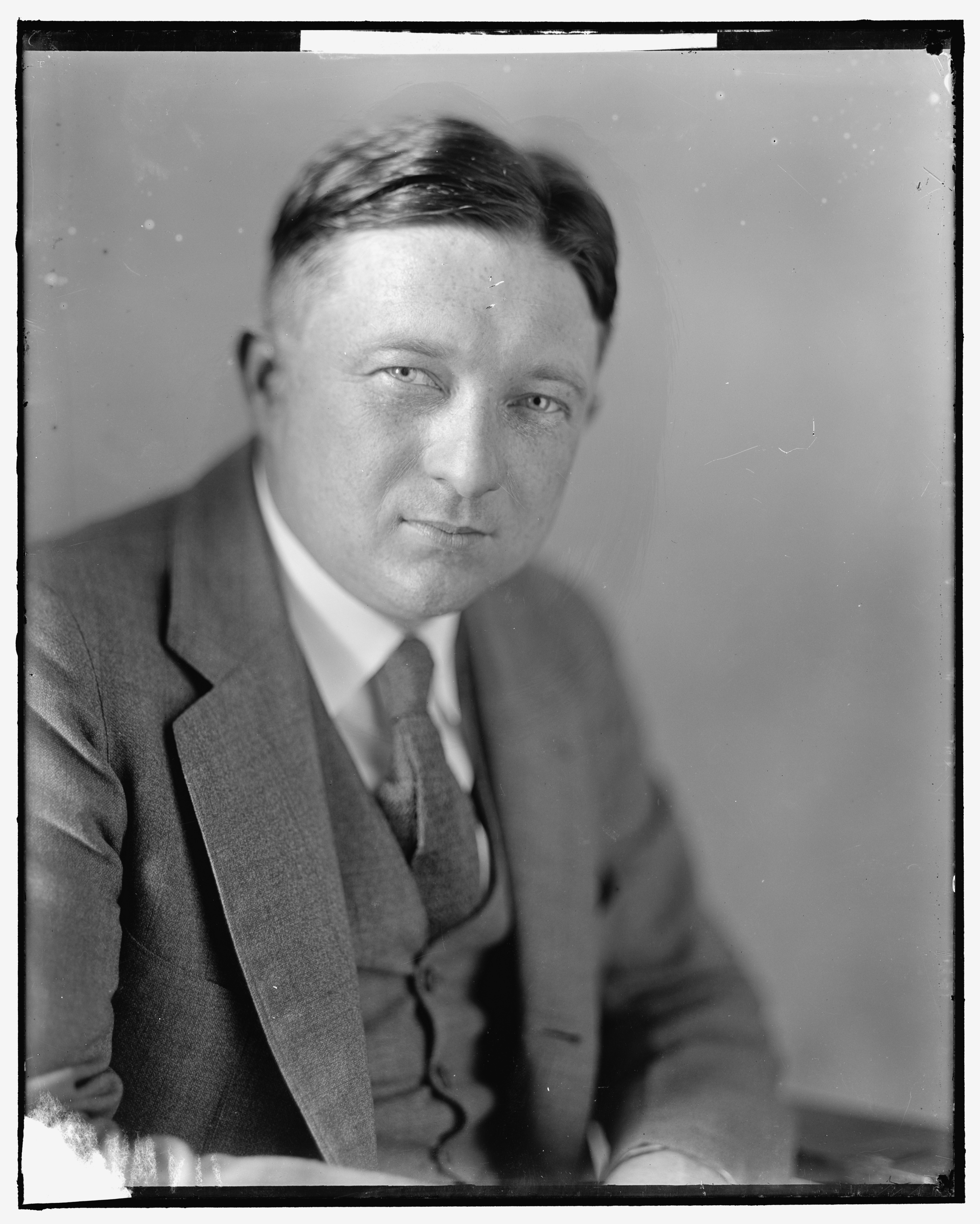

Senior Judge of the United States District Court for the District of Columbia
- In office April 2, 1965 – June 11, 1970

Chief Judge of the United States District Court for the District of Columbia
- In office 1959–1961
- Preceded by: F. Dickinson Letts
- Succeeded by: Matthew Francis McGuire

Judge of the United States District Court for the District of Columbia
- In office March 29, 1940 – April 2, 1965
- Appointed by: Franklin D. Roosevelt
- Preceded by: Joseph Winston Cox
- Succeeded by: William B. Bryant

United States Attorney for the District of Columbia
- In office 1938–1940
- President: Franklin D. Roosevelt
- Preceded by: Leslie C. Garnett
- Succeeded by: Edward Matthew Curran

Personal details
- Born: David Andrew Pine; September 22, 1891 Washington, D.C., U.S.
- Died: June 11, 1970 (aged 78)
- Education: Georgetown Law (LL.B.)

David Andrew Pine (September 22, 1891 – June 11, 1970) was a United States district judge of the United States District Court for the District of Columbia.

== Education and career ==
Born on September 22, 1891, in Washington, D.C., Pine received a Bachelor of Laws in 1913 from Georgetown Law. He served in the United States Department of Justice from 1914 to 1917, serving as a confidential clerk to Attorney General James Clark McReynolds from 1914 to 1916 and as a law clerk and assistant attorney from 1916 to 1917. He served in the United States Army from 1917 to 1919. He returned to the United States Department of Justice from 1919 to 1921, serving as an assistant attorney in 1919 and as special assistant to the Attorney General in western states from 1919 to 1921. He was in private practice in Washington, D.C. from 1921 to 1934. He was the Chief Assistant United States Attorney for the District of Columbia from 1934 to 1937. He was the United States Attorney for the District of Columbia from 1938 to 1940.

== Federal judicial service ==
Pine was nominated by President Franklin D. Roosevelt on March 15, 1940, to an Associate Justice seat on the District Court of the United States for the District of Columbia (Judge of the United States District Court for the District of Columbia from June 25, 1948) vacated by Associate Justice Joseph Winston Cox. He was confirmed by the United States Senate on March 20, 1940, and received his commission on March 29, 1940. He served as Chief Judge and as a member of the Judicial Conference of the United States from 1959 to 1961. He assumed senior status on April 2, 1965. His service terminated on June 11, 1970, due to his death.

=== Notable case ===
Among the cases which Pine presided over was a 1952 matter which eventually came before the United States Supreme Court as Youngstown Sheet & Tube Co. v. Sawyer. In that case, Pine issued an injunction barring the government from continuing to hold steel plants that it had seized on the order of Harry S. Truman. Truman sought to avert a strike by steel workers which Truman asserted would harm the efforts of the United States in the Korean War. Pine found this to exceed the power of the President, and the Supreme Court ultimately agreed with him, upholding the injunction.

== Sources ==
Legal offices
| Preceded by Joseph Winston Cox | Judge of the United States District Court for the District of Columbia; 1940–1965 | Succeeded by William B. Bryant |
| Preceded by F. Dickinson Letts | Chief Judge of the United States District Court for the District of Columbia; 1959–1961 | Succeeded by Matthew Francis McGuire |
