= Joseph Winston Cox =

American judge

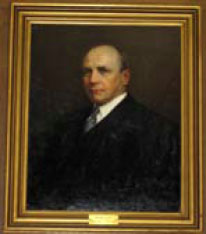

Associate Justice of the District Court of the United States for the District of Columbia
- In office July 7, 1930 – September 9, 1939
- Appointed by: Herbert Hoover
- Preceded by: Seat established by 46 Stat. 785
- Succeeded by: David Andrew Pine

Personal details
- Born: Joseph Winston Cox; October 19, 1875 Bridle Creek, Virginia
- Died: September 9, 1939 (aged 63)
- Education: George Washington University Law School (LL.B.)

Joseph Winston Cox (October 19, 1875 – September 9, 1939) was an associate justice of the District Court of the United States for the District of Columbia.

== Education and career ==
Born in Bridle Creek, an unincorporated community in Grayson County, Virginia, Cox received a Bachelor of Laws from George Washington University Law School in 1901. He was in private practice in Washington, D.C. from 1901 to 1930, and was also an instructor at Georgetown Law from 1913 to 1915, a special assistant to the United States Attorney General in enforcement of anti-trust laws and matters arising in special war activities of the United States from 1914 to 1919. He also served as a member of the District Selective Service Board from 1917 to 1918, and was a regional counsel to the United States Railroad Administration from 1919 to 1920. He was a professorial lecturer at George Washington University from 1928 to 1930.

== Federal judicial service ==
Cox was nominated by President Herbert Hoover on June 23, 1930, to the Supreme Court of the District of Columbia (District Court of the United States for the District of Columbia from June 25, 1936, now the United States District Court for the District of Columbia), to a new Associate Justice seat authorized by 46 Stat. 785. He was confirmed by the United States Senate on July 1, 1930, and received his commission on July 7, 1930. His service terminated on September 9, 1939, due to his death.

== See also ==
- Brookside Farm, Cox's childhood home

== Sources ==
Legal offices
Preceded by Seat established by 46 Stat. 785	Associate Justice of the District Court of the United States for the District of Columbia; 1930–1939	Succeeded by David Andrew Pine
