= Andrew Coyle Bradley =

American judge

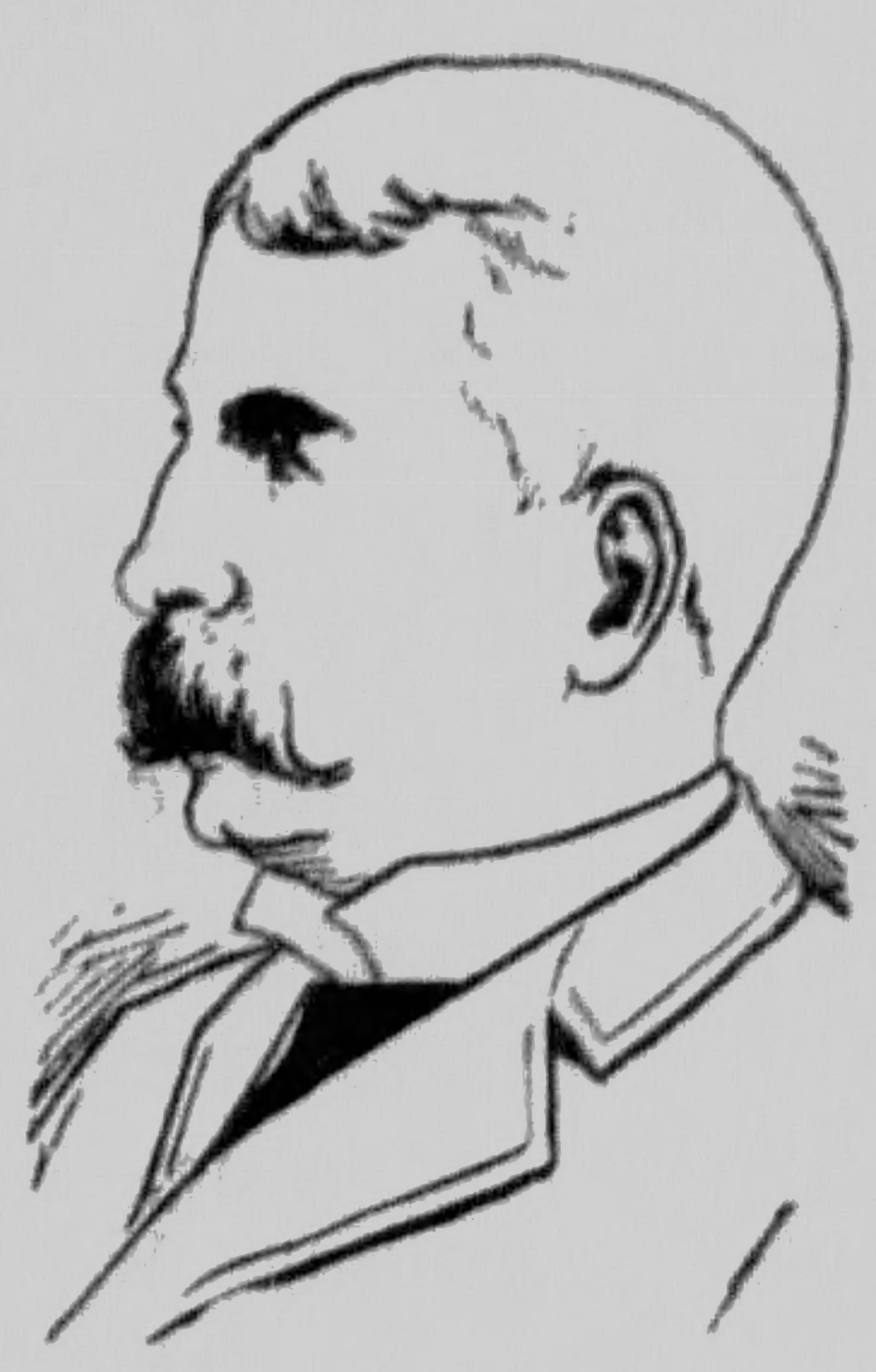

Associate Justice of the Supreme Court of the District of Columbia
- In office March 23, 1889 – May 15, 1902
- Appointed by: Benjamin Harrison
- Preceded by: William Matthews Merrick
- Succeeded by: Ashley Mulgrave Gould

Personal details
- Born: Andrew Coyle Bradley; February 12, 1844 Washington, D.C., U.S.
- Died: May 15, 1902 (aged 58) Washington, D.C., U.S.
- Resting place: Rock Creek Cemetery; Washington, D.C., U.S.
- Education: Harvard Law School (LL.B.); George Washington University

Andrew Coyle Bradley (February 12, 1844 – May 15, 1902) was an Associate Justice of the Supreme Court of the District of Columbia.

== Education and career ==
Born in Washington, D.C., a grandson of Abraham Bradley Jr., Bradley attended Columbian University (now George Washington University) until serving in the quartermaster general and commissary general offices of the Union Army in Washington, D.C. during the American Civil War. He resumed his studies after the war, received a Bachelor of Laws from Harvard Law School in 1867, was admitted to the bar in Massachusetts, and practiced law in Washington, D.C. He also served as a professor of law at Columbian University.

== Federal judicial service ==
Bradley was nominated by President Benjamin Harrison on March 19, 1889, to an Associate Justice seat on the Supreme Court of the District of Columbia (now the United States District Court for the District of Columbia) vacated by Associate Justice William Matthews Merrick. He was confirmed by the United States Senate on March 23, 1889, and received his commission the same day. His service terminated on May 15, 1902, due to his death in Washington, D.C. He was interred in Rock Creek Cemetery in Washington, D.C.

== Sources ==
Legal offices
Preceded by William Matthews Merrick	Associate Justice of the Supreme Court of the District of Columbia; 1889–1902	Succeeded by Ashley Mulgrave Gould
