= Ashley Mulgrave Gould =

American judge

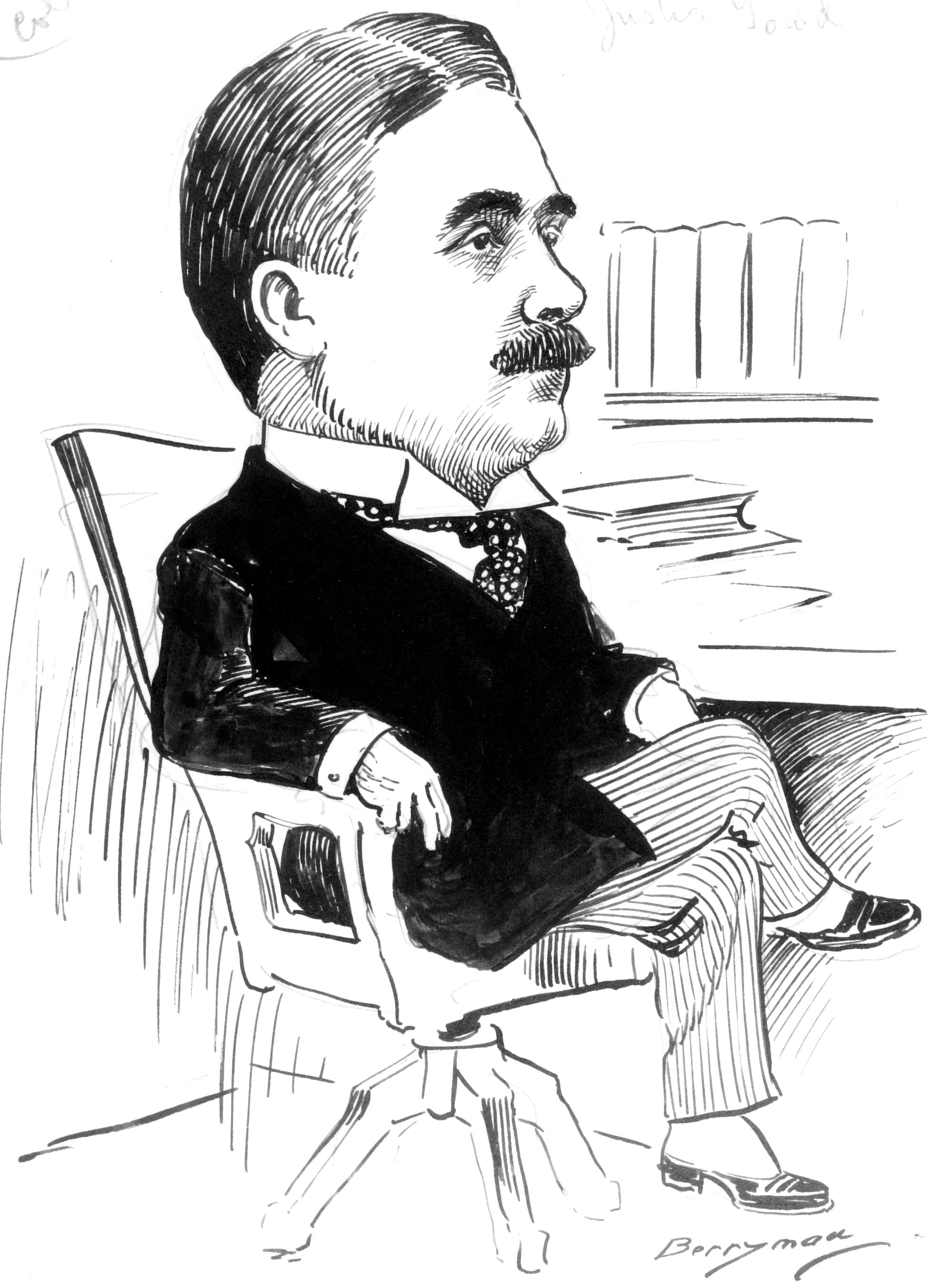
- 1905 caricature

Associate Justice of the Supreme Court of the District of Columbia
- In office December 8, 1902 – May 20, 1921
- Appointed by: Theodore Roosevelt
- Preceded by: Andrew Coyle Bradley
- Succeeded by: Adolph A. Hoehling Jr.

Member of the Maryland House of Delegates
- In office 1898

Personal details
- Born: Ashley Mulgrave Gould; October 8, 1859 Lower Horton, Nova Scotia, British America
- Died: May 20, 1921 (aged 61)
- Party: Republican
- Education: Amherst College (A.B.); Georgetown Law (LL.B.)

Ashley Mulgrave Gould (October 8, 1859 – May 20, 1921) was an Associate Justice of the Supreme Court of the District of Columbia.

== Education and career ==
Born in Lower Horton, (now Wolfville), Nova Scotia, British America (now Canada), Gould received an Artium Baccalaureus degree from Amherst College in 1881 and a Bachelor of Laws from Georgetown Law in 1884. He was a member of the Maryland House of Delegates in 1898, and was the United States Attorney for the District of Columbia from 1901 to 1902. He began teaching as a professor of law at Georgetown University in 1901.

== Federal judicial service ==
Gould was nominated by President Theodore Roosevelt on December 2, 1902, to an Associate Justice seat on the Supreme Court of the District of Columbia (now the United States District Court for the District of Columbia) vacated by Associate Justice Andrew Coyle Bradley. He was confirmed by the United States Senate on December 8, 1902, and received his commission the same day. His service terminated on May 20, 1921, due to his death.

== Sources ==
Legal offices
Preceded by Andrew Coyle Bradley	Associate Justice of the Supreme Court of the District of Columbia; 1902–1921	Succeeded by Adolph A. Hoehling Jr.
