= Ellen Segal Huvelle =

American judge (born 1948)

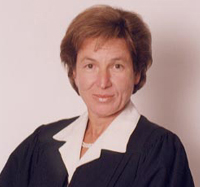

Senior Judge of the United States District Court for the District of Columbia
- Incumbent
- Assumed office June 3, 2014

Judge of the United States District Court for the District of Columbia
- In office October 26, 1999 – June 3, 2014
- Appointed by: Bill Clinton
- Preceded by: John Garrett Penn
- Succeeded by: Amit Mehta

Associate Judge of the Superior Court of the District of Columbia
- In office 1990–1999
- Appointed by: George H. W. Bush
- Succeeded by: John Ramsey Johnson

Personal details
- Born: Ellen Judith Segal; June 3, 1948 (age 77) Boston, Massachusetts, U.S.
- Spouse: Jeffrey G. Huvelle
- Children: 2
- Education: Wellesley College (BA); Yale University (MCP); Boston College (JD)

Ellen Judith Huvelle (née Segal; born June 3, 1948) is an inactive Senior United States district judge of the United States District Court for the District of Columbia. She has overseen several significant cases. In a case decided in May 2001, Huvelle "upheld federal regulations that restrict the sale of consumers' names, Social Security numbers, dates of birth, addresses and phone numbers." Later that year, Huvelle heard requests by family members of Vince Foster seeking access to pictures of his body taken after his death. In November 2005, she accepted the guilty plea in the high-profile prosecution of lobbyist Michael Scanlon. Huvelle assumed senior status on June 3, 2014.

== Early life and career ==
Born in Boston, Massachusetts, Huvelle grew up in Newton, Massachusetts and graduated from Newton High School in 1966.

=== Education ===
She received a Bachelor of Arts degree from Wellesley College in 1970 and a Master in City Planning from the Yale School of Architecture in 1972. With her father and brother both lawyers, Huvelle focused on the law and in 1975 earned a Juris Doctor from the Boston College Law School.

=== Early career ===
In 1973 she was a law clerk for the appellate division of the Suffolk County District Attorney's Office in Massachusetts. In 1974 she was a public defender for the Committee for Public Counsel Services in Boston.

=== Legal career ===
Following law school, she served as law clerk to Chief Justice Edward F. Hennessey of the Massachusetts Supreme Judicial Court from 1975 to 1976. From 1976 until 1984, Huvelle was an associate at the firm of Williams & Connolly in Washington, D.C. and in 1984, she became the first female partner at that firm, where she remained until 1990.

In 1983, Huvelle was one of three attorneys who drafted an amicus brief on behalf of the Motion Picture Association of America in the landmark case of Sony Corp. of America v. Universal City Studios, Inc.. As a partner at Williams & Connolly, Huvelle represented several notable clients including hotel magnate Leona Helmsley and fight promoter Don King.

== Judicial service ==
=== District of Columbia superior court service ===
Huvelle was appointed by President George H. W. Bush as an Associate Judge of the District of Columbia Superior Court in September 1990 and served in the Civil, Criminal and Family Divisions until her appointment to the federal bench. While serving on that court, she was a lecturer at the University of Virginia School of Law from 1997 to 1999.

=== Federal judicial service ===
On March 25, 1999, Huvelle was nominated by President Bill Clinton to a seat on the United States District Court for the District of Columbia, vacated by John Garrett Penn. She was confirmed by the United States Senate on October 15, 1999, receiving her commission on October 26, 1999. Senator Patrick Leahy cited the long delays in Huvelle's confirmation as United States District Judge as a troubling example of problems in the confirmation process. She took senior status on June 3, 2014.

Huvelle has been a Fellow of the American Bar Association, a member of the Edward Bennett Williams Inn of Court, and has taught trial practice at Harvard Law School's Trial Advocacy Workshop and at the University of Virginia School of Law.

== Notable opinions ==
=== Privacy and "opt out" ===
According to CNN Huvelle played a key role in ensuring that ordinary consumers can opt out of information collection on their personal information.

=== A.C.L.U. v. U.S. Dept. of Justice ===
Huvelle ruled on American Civil Liberties Union, et al v. U.S. Dept. of Justice, 265 F.Supp.2d 20.

=== Murat Kurnaz v. George W. Bush ===
Huvelle made a ruling on Guantanamo captive Murat Kurnaz's habeas corpus petition in Murat Kurnaz v. George W. Bush.

=== XM Radio ===
In the summer of 2006 Huvelle amalgamated related cases into a class action against In re XM Satellite Radio Holdings Securities Litigation, C.A. No. 06-0802.

=== Former Interior Deputy Secretary J. Steven Griles ===
Huvelle ruled on the sentencing of former Deputy Secretary of the Interior J. Steven Griles.

=== Drone strikes ===
In February 2016, Huvelle found that the next friend of Yemenis killed in a U.S. drone strike could not sue under the Torture Victims Protection Act nor the Alien Tort Statute because the attack raised a political question.

== Personal life ==
Huvelle is married to labor lawyer Jeffrey Huvelle.

Legal offices
Preceded by John Garrett Penn	Judge of the United States District Court for the District of Columbia; 1999–2014	Succeeded by Amit Mehta
