= John Ramsey Johnson =

American judge (born 1945)

Associate Judge on the Superior Court of the District of Columbia
- In office November 17, 2000 – May 17, 2019
- President: Bill Clinton
- Preceded by: Ellen Segal Huvelle
- Succeeded by: Veronica M. Sanchez

Personal details
- Born: May 23, 1945 (age 80); Canton, Ohio, U.S.
- Children: 2
- Education: Georgetown University (BA); Antioch School of Law (JD)

John Ramsey Johnson (born May 23, 1945) is a retired Associate Judge on the Superior Court of the District of Columbia.

== Education and career ==
Johnson earned his Bachelor of Arts from Georgetown University. After graduating, he joined the Air Force, where he rose to the rank of captain. Upon leaving the Air Force, he attended Antioch School of Law, receiving his Juris Doctor in 1976.

=== D.C. Superior Court ===
President Bill Clinton nominated Johnson on May 5, 2000, to a 15-year term as an associate judge on the Superior Court of the District of Columbia to the seat vacated by Ellen Segal Huvelle. On September 13, 2000, the Senate Committee on Homeland Security and Governmental Affairs held a hearing on his nomination. On September 27, 2000, the Committee reported his nomination favorably to the senate floor. On October 26, 2000, the full Senate confirmed his nomination by voice vote. He was sworn in on November 17, 2000.

On September 15, 2015, the Commission on Judicial Disabilities and Tenure recommended that President Obama reappoint him to second 15-year term as a judge on the D.C. Superior Court. He retired from active service on May 17, 2019.

== Personal life ==
Johnson was raised in Washington D.C. and been living there since. He is married and has two children.
