= Veronica M. Sanchez =

American judge (born 1974)

Veronica Sanchez
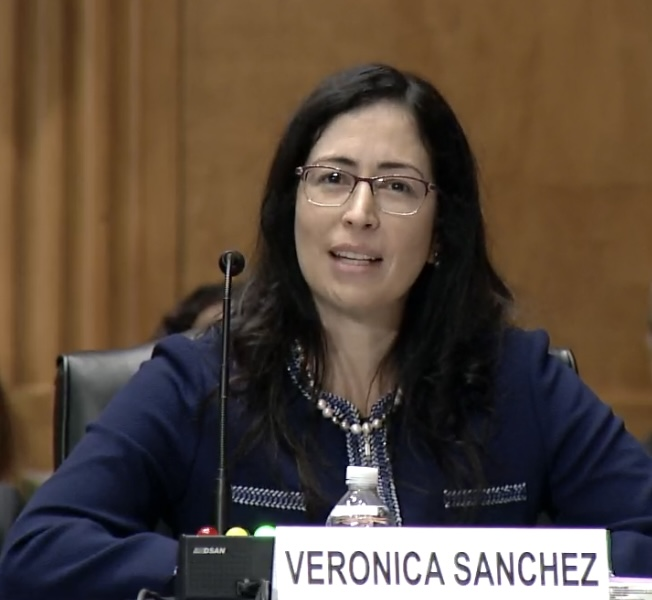

Associate Judge of the Superior Court of the District of Columbia
- Incumbent
- Assumed office January 17, 2023
- Appointed by: Joe Biden
- Preceded by: John Ramsey Johnson

Personal details
- Born: January 26, 1974 (age 52) Managua, Nicaragua
- Education: Duke University (BA); University of California, Los Angeles (JD)

Veronica M. Sanchez (born January 26, 1974) is an American lawyer who has served as an associate judge of the Superior Court of the District of Columbia since 2023.

== Education ==
Sanchez earned a Bachelor of Arts degree from Duke University in 1996 and a Juris Doctor from the UCLA School of Law in 1999.

== Career ==
Sanchez served as a law clerk for Judge Edward Cornelius Reed Jr. of the United States District Court for the District of Nevada from 1999 to 2001 and Judge Melvin T. Brunetti of the United States Court of Appeals for the Ninth Circuit from 2001 and 2002. From 2002 and 2009, she served as a trial attorney in the United States Department of Justice Antitrust Division. She joined the United States Attorney's Office for the District of Columbia and from 2009 to 2023, she was an assistant United States attorney serving as deputy chief of the Major Crimes Section in 2022, and assistant attorney in the Homicide Section.

=== D.C. superior court ===
On July 14, 2022, President Joe Biden nominated Sanchez to serve as a judge of the Superior Court of the District of Columbia. President Biden nominated Sanchez to the seat vacated by Judge John Ramsey Johnson, whose term expired on May 17, 2019. On September 21, 2022, a hearing on her nomination was held before the Senate Homeland Security and Governmental Affairs Committee. On September 28, 2022, her nomination was favorably reported out of committee by voice vote en bloc, with Senators Rick Scott and Josh Hawley voting "no" on record. On December 15, 2022, the Senate confirmed her nomination by voice vote. She was sworn in on January 17, 2023.

Legal offices
Preceded by John Ramsey Johnson	Judge of the Superior Court of the District of Columbia; 2023–present	Incumbent
