= Aubrey Eugene Robinson Jr. =

American judge

Senior Judge of the United States District Court for the District of Columbia
- In office March 1, 1992 – February 27, 2000

Chief Judge of the United States District Court for the District of Columbia
- In office 1982–1992
- Preceded by: John Lewis Smith Jr.
- Succeeded by: John Garrett Penn

Judge of the United States District Court for the District of Columbia
- In office November 3, 1966 – March 1, 1992
- Appointed by: Lyndon B. Johnson
- Preceded by: Matthew Francis McGuire
- Succeeded by: Ricardo M. Urbina

Personal details
- Born: Aubrey Eugene Robinson Jr. March 30, 1922 Madison, New Jersey, U.S.
- Died: February 27, 2000 (aged 77) Washington, D.C., U.S.
- Party: Democratic
- Education: Cornell University (BA, LLB)

Aubrey Eugene Robinson Jr. (March 30, 1922 – February 27, 2000) was a United States district judge of the United States District Court for the District of Columbia.

== Education and career ==
Born in Madison, New Jersey, Robinson received a Bachelor of Arts degree from Cornell University in 1943, where he became a member of Alpha Phi Alpha fraternity. Robinson then served in the United States Army until 1946, receiving a Bachelor of Laws from Cornell Law School in 1947. He was in private practice in Washington, D.C. from 1948 to 1965, and was then an associate judge of the Juvenile Court of the District of Columbia from 1965 to 1966. He was an adjunct professor at American University from 1975 to 1983.

=== Federal judicial service ===
On October 6, 1966, Robinson was nominated by President Lyndon B. Johnson to a seat on the United States District Court for the District of Columbia vacated by Judge Matthew Francis McGuire. Robinson was confirmed by the United States Senate on October 20, 1966, and received his commission on November 3, 1966. He served as Chief Judge from 1982 to 1992, and assumed senior status on March 1, 1992. He served in that capacity until his death.

=== Notable cases ===
Robinson awarded punitive damages to the families of victims of Korean Air Lines Flight 007, though the decision was overturned by a higher court. He sentenced Jonathan Pollard to life in prison in 1987, citing information provided from Secretary of Defense Caspar Weinberger that Pollard's spying on behalf of Israel had caused significant damage to American security interests. Pollard had pleaded guilty to one count of conspiracy to deliver national defense information to a foreign government and had agreed to cooperate with federal authorities in exchange for a lesser sentence than the maximum provided under law.

== Personal life and death ==
Robinson died at the age of 77 on February 27, 2000, due to a heart attack suffered at his home in Washington, D.C.

== See also ==
- List of African-American federal judges
- List of African-American jurists

== Sources ==
Legal offices
Preceded by Matthew Francis McGuire	Judge of the United States District Court for the District of Columbia; 1966–1992	Succeeded by Ricardo M. Urbina
Preceded by John Lewis Smith Jr.	Chief Judge of the United States District Court for the District of Columbia; 1982–1992	Succeeded by John Garrett Penn
