= Pennsylvania Association for Retarded Citizens v. Commonwealth of Pennsylvania =

U.S. court case

Pennsylvania Association for Retarded Children v. Commonwealth of Pennsylvania
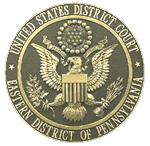
- Court: United States District Court for the Eastern District of Pennsylvania
- Full case name: Pennsylvania Association for Retarded Children, Nancy Beth Bowman, et al. v. Commonwealth of Pennsylvania, David H. Kurtzman, et al.
- Docket nos.: Civ. A. No. 71-42
- Citation: 334 F. Supp. 1257

Case history
- Subsequent action: 343 F. Supp. 279 (E.D. Pa. 1972)

Court membership
- Judges sitting: Arlin Adams, Thomas Ambrose Masterson, Raymond J. Broderick

Pennsylvania Association for Retarded Citizens (PARC) v. Commonwealth of Pennsylvania, 334 F. Supp. 1257 (E.D. Pa. 1971), was a case where the Commonwealth of Pennsylvania was sued by the Pennsylvania Association for Retarded Citizens (PARC), now The Arc of Pennsylvania, over a law that gave public schools the authority to deny a free education to children who had reached the age of 8, yet had not reached the mental age of 5. The law had also been used by the state in multiple occasions to deny free public education to children who had a hard time integrating into classroom environments and schools. This was the first major legal case to provide equality to students with disabilities. The case was filed and settled by the United States District Court for the Eastern District of Pennsylvania and lasted between 1971 and 1972. The case was over seen by three judges, Circuit Judge Adams, and two District Judges, Masterson and Broderick. The language used during this case is outdated to modern times; therefore, the use of the word "mentally retarded" refers to any intellectual disability.

== Argument ==
The argument of the case was that all children, whether having an intellectual disability or not, could benefit from any type of free training or education. It was also argued that not having free educational resources will negatively affect the way a child develops. Although children with intellectual disability would benefit differently than other children, they would be able to develop levels of self-care. Furthermore, the more education they received, the more they could continue to benefit. Pennsylvania's education laws at that time allowed the students' rights of due process to be denied along with a free public education. This was argued by the plaintiffs to be both unlawful and unjust.

== Plaintiffs ==
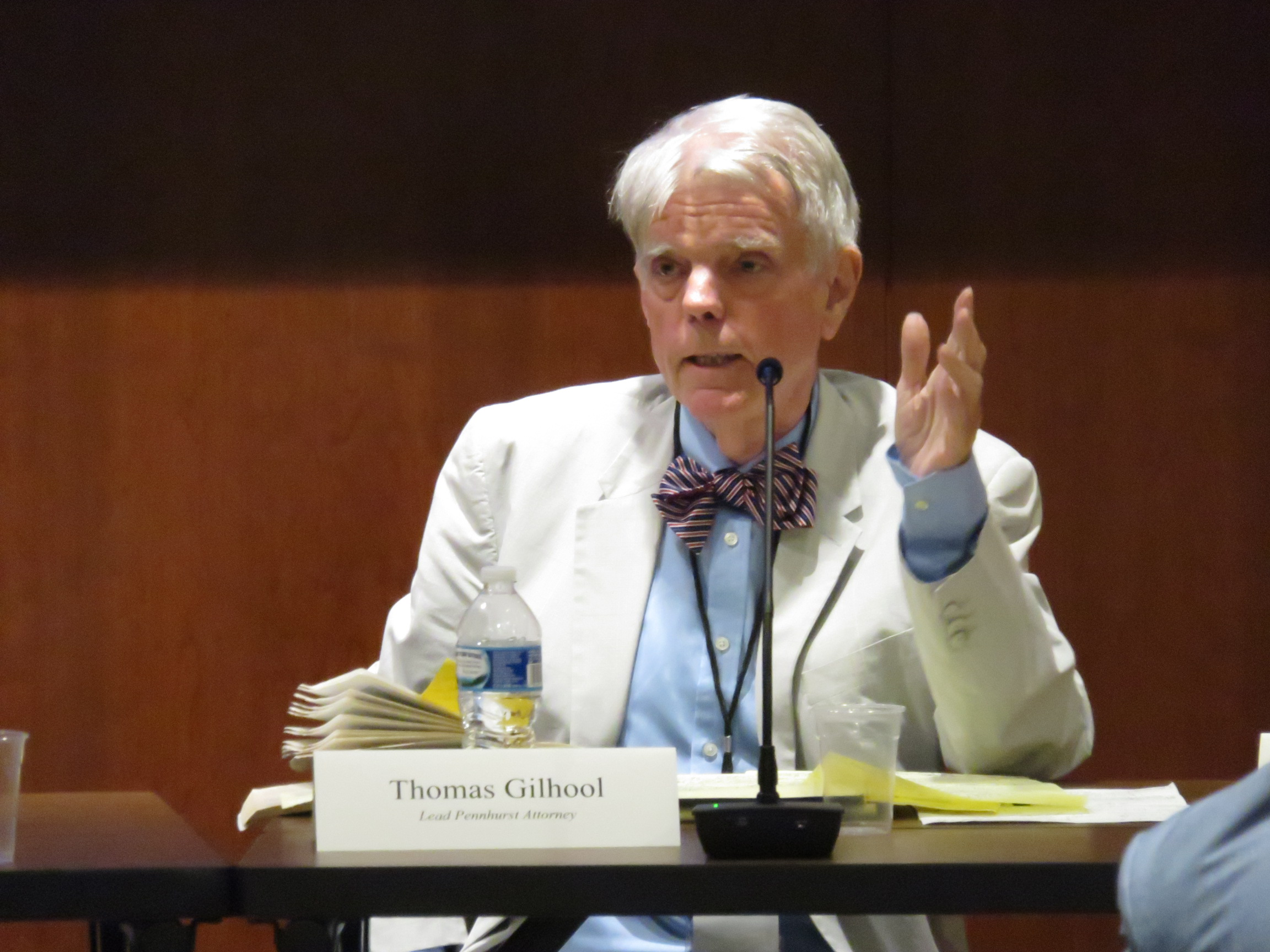
Thomas Gilhool, the lead plaintiff's attorney in PARC v. Commonwealth of Pennsylvania, discusses the strategy of the Public Interest Law Center of Philadelphia in its decision to pursue PARC v. Commonwealth of Pennsylvania prior to Pennhurst State School and Hospital v. Halderman (1984); part of a panel discussion, "The Disability Rights Movement: From Pennhurst Until Today", U.S. Capitol Visitor Center, Washington, D.C., 27 June 2016.

The plaintiffs in the case are the Pennsylvania Association for Retarded Citizens and the families of children with intellectual disabilities who were denied an education.

The Pennsylvania Association for Retarded Citizens (PARC) is a non-profit organization created in 1949 with goals of advancing the interests of citizens with intellectual and developmental disabilities (I/DD) in Pennsylvania, along with ensuring that people with I/DD get their share and equal resources that is given to all citizens of the state. During the time of the case, PARC had member chapters in 53 out of the 67 counties in Pennsylvania. The PARC chapters ran education programs for children with intellectual disabilities and had been doing so for up to 20 years before the case.

The families that sued along with the PARC all had children that were of school age (6-21), were identified as having an intellectual disability, and were denied free public education from the state of Pennsylvania due to an intellectual disability. All of the families claimed that their child would benefit from the free education they had so wrongfully been denied. Each family had also elected their child to be entered into public schools. Thirteen families sued all together.

== Ruling ==
Early in 1972 the two sides settled after the evidence that was provided had been evaluated. A consent decree was given by the U.S. District Court Judge Thomas Ambrose Masterson that ruled the existing law restricting kids ages six to twenty-one years of age was unconstitutional. It was also stated that Pennsylvania was responsible for providing free public education to all children; that meant that no child, regardless of their disability, could be turned down by the Commonwealth to the access of free public trainings and educational programs. The quality of the education and training given to the children with disabilities had to match that of the education and training given to general students.

== Aftermath ==
Pennsylvania was not the only state at the time with legislation that restricted education for students with disabilities. Other states enforced similar laws. However, Pennsylvania Association for Retarded Citizens (PARC) v. Commonwealth of Pennsylvania, was the first case in which education restricting legislation was contested and defeated. Following PARC vs PA, other cases involving children with disabilities and their fight for educational equality were won. One such case, Mills v. Board of Education of District of Columbia was settled in 1972 and expanded the PARC vs. PA decision to include children with physical disabilities. These cases ultimately led to the passage of the Education for All Handicapped Children Act in 1975.
