= Peyton Gordon =

American judge (1870–1946)

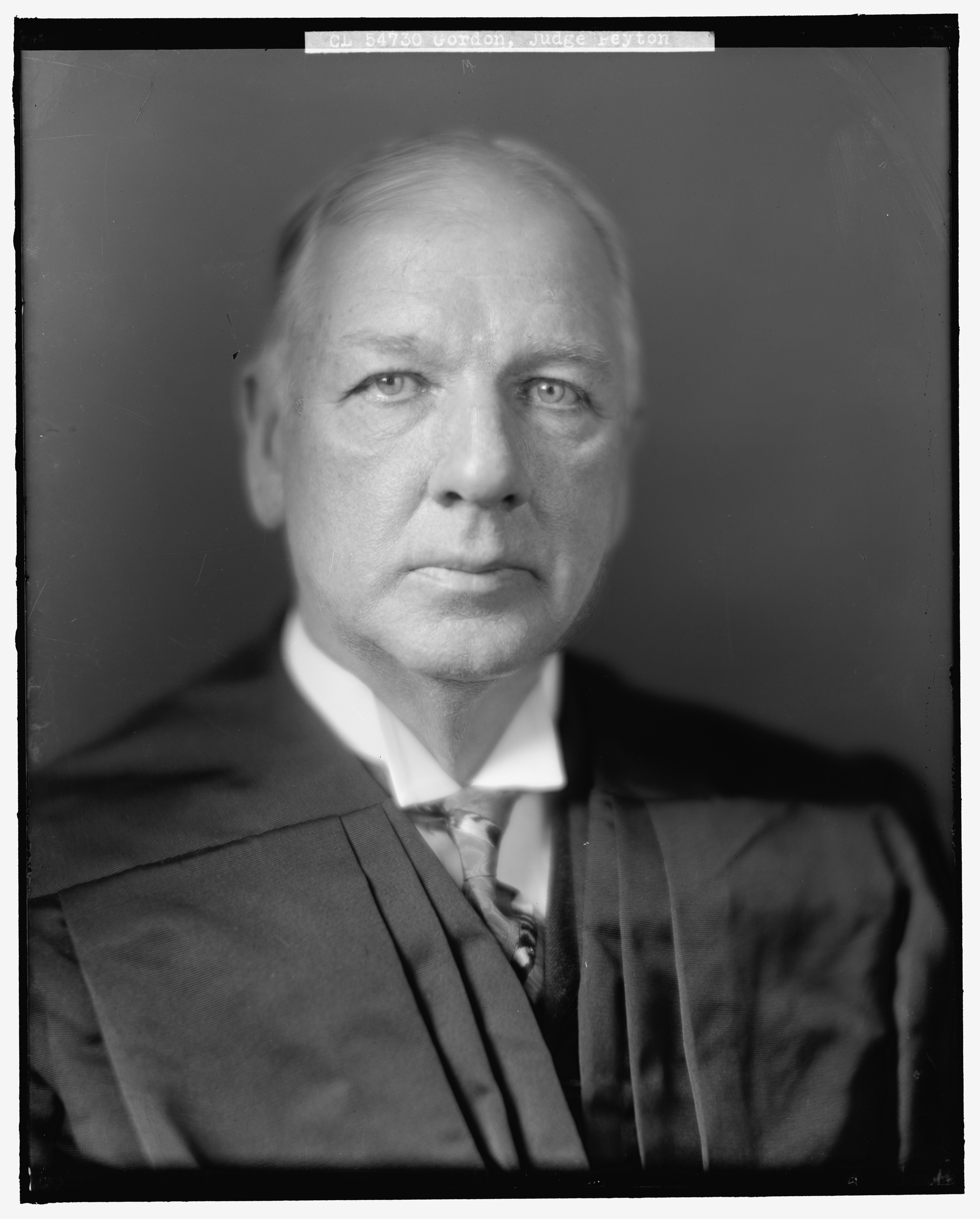

Senior Judge of the District Court of the United States for the District of Columbia
- In office February 4, 1941 – September 17, 1946

Associate Justice of the District Court of the United States for the District of Columbia
- In office March 29, 1928 – February 4, 1941
- Appointed by: Calvin Coolidge
- Preceded by: Adolph A. Hoehling Jr.
- Succeeded by: Matthew Francis McGuire

26th United States Attorney for the District of Columbia
- In office 1921–1928
- President: Warren G. Harding; Calvin Coolidge
- Preceded by: John E. Laskey
- Succeeded by: Leo A. Rover

Personal details
- Born: Peyton Gordon; April 30, 1870 Washington, D.C., U.S.
- Died: September 17, 1946 (aged 76) Washington, D.C., U.S.
- Education: George Washington University Law School (LL.B., LL.M.)

Peyton Gordon (April 30, 1870 – September 17, 1946) was an Associate Justice of the District Court of the United States for the District of Columbia.

== Education and career ==
Born in Washington, D.C., Gordon received a Bachelor of Laws from Columbian University School of Law (now George Washington University Law School) in 1890 and a Master of Laws from the same institution in 1891. He was an Assistant United States Attorney for the District of Columbia from 1891 to 1904. He was the Pardon Attorney from 1904 to 1907. He was a special assistant to the United States Attorney General from 1907 to 1913. He was in private practice in Washington, D.C. from 1914 to 1917. He was in the United States Army JAG Corps from 1917 to 1918, and then returned to private practice in Washington, D.C. until 1921. He served as the United States Attorney for the District of Columbia from 1921 to 1928.

== Federal judicial service ==
Gordon was nominated by President Calvin Coolidge on February 27, 1928, to an Associate Justice seat on the Supreme Court of the District of Columbia (District Court of the United States for the District of Columbia from June 25, 1936, now the United States District Court for the District of Columbia) vacated by Associate Justice Adolph A. Hoehling Jr. He was confirmed by the United States Senate on March 29, 1928, and received his commission the same day. He assumed senior status on February 4, 1941. His service terminated on September 17, 1946, due to his death in Washington, D.C.

== Sources ==
Legal offices
Preceded by Adolph A. Hoehling Jr.	Associate Justice of the District Court of the United States for the District of Columbia; 1928–1941	Succeeded by Matthew Francis McGuire
