= John Garrett Penn =

American judge

Senior Judge of the United States District Court for the District of Columbia
- In office March 31, 1998 – September 9, 2007

Chief Judge of the United States District Court for the District of Columbia
- In office 1992–1997
- Preceded by: Aubrey Eugene Robinson Jr.
- Succeeded by: Norma Holloway Johnson

Judge of the United States District Court for the District of Columbia
- In office March 23, 1979 – March 31, 1998
- Appointed by: Jimmy Carter
- Preceded by: Joseph Cornelius Waddy
- Succeeded by: Ellen Segal Huvelle

Personal details
- Born: John Garrett Penn; March 19, 1932 Pittsfield, Massachusetts
- Died: September 9, 2007 (aged 75) Washington, D.C.
- Education: Princeton University; University of Massachusetts Amherst (AB); Boston University School of Law (LLB)

John Garrett Penn (March 19, 1932 – September 9, 2007) was a United States district judge of the United States District Court for the District of Columbia.

== Education and career ==
Born in Pittsfield, Massachusetts, Penn's father was a machinist. Penn attended the Woodrow Wilson School of Public and International Affairs at Princeton University and received an Artium Baccalaureus degree from the University of Massachusetts Amherst in 1954. Initially, Penn was a chemistry major but chose to concentrate on law due to the civil rights movement. He then earned a Bachelor of Laws from Boston University School of Law in 1957. He served on the United States Army Judge Advocate General's Corps from 1958 to 1961 and achieved the rank of first lieutenant. In 1961, Penn joined the tax division of the United States Department of Justice, becoming assistant chief of the division's general litigation section. He also served as a trial attorney from 1961 to 1965 and a reviewer from 1965 to 1968. Penn served as a judge of the District of Columbia Court of General Sessions from 1970 to 1971. He served as an associate judge of the Superior Court of the District of Columbia from 1971 to 1979.

== Federal judicial service ==
Penn was nominated by President Jimmy Carter on January 19, 1979, to a seat on the United States District Court for the District of Columbia which had been vacated by Judge Joseph Cornelius Waddy. He was confirmed by the United States Senate on March 21, 1979, and received his commission on March 23, 1979. He served as Chief Judge from 1992 to 1997. He assumed senior status on March 31, 1998. Penn served in that capacity until his death on September 9, 2007, in Washington, D.C.

== See also ==
- List of African-American federal judges
- List of African-American jurists

== Sources ==
Legal offices
Preceded by Joseph Cornelius Waddy	Judge of the United States District Court for the District of Columbia; 1979–1998	Succeeded by Ellen Segal Huvelle
Preceded by Aubrey Eugene Robinson Jr.	Chief Judge of the United States District Court for the District of Columbia; 1992–1997	Succeeded by Norma Holloway Johnson
