= Adolph A. Hoehling Jr. =

American judge

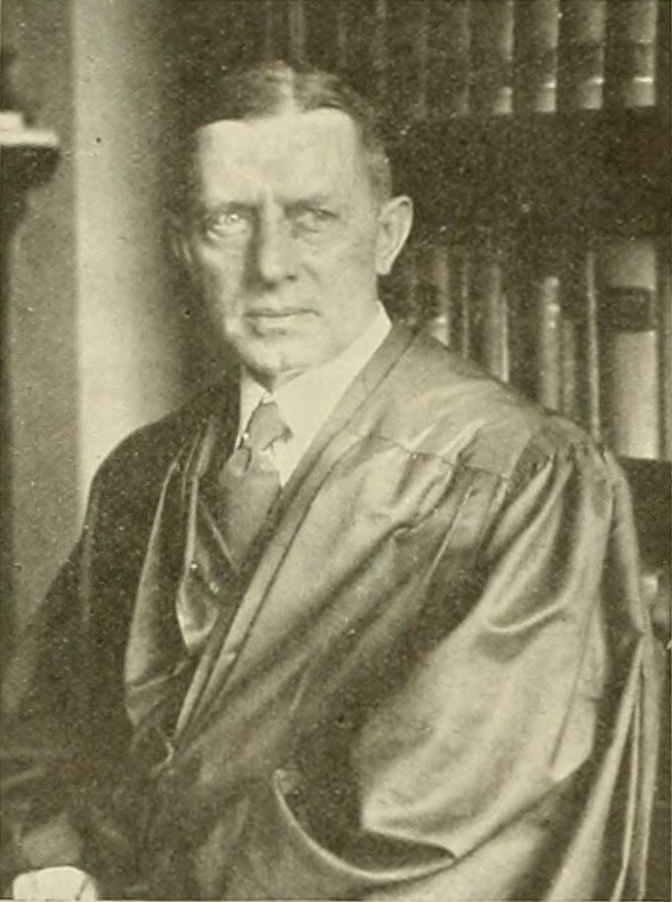
- "Lehigh Alumni Bulletin", November 1, 1921

Associate Justice of the Supreme Court of the District of Columbia
- In office June 13, 1921 – December 31, 1927
- Appointed by: Warren G. Harding
- Preceded by: Ashley Mulgrave Gould
- Succeeded by: Peyton Gordon

Personal details
- Born: Adolph August Hoehling Jr. November 3, 1868 Philadelphia, Pennsylvania, US
- Died: February 17, 1941 (aged 72) Washington, D.C., US
- Resting place: Arlington National Cemetery
- Education: Columbian University (LLB, LLM)

Adolph August Hoehling Jr. (November 3, 1868 – February 17, 1941) was an Associate Justice of the Supreme Court of the District of Columbia.

== Education and career ==
Born in Philadelphia, Pennsylvania, Hoehling was the son of Annie Tilghman Hoehling (1841–1923) and Adolph A. Hoehling (1839–1920), a rear admiral and doctor in the United States Navy's medical corps. The younger Hoehling attended Rensselaer Polytechnic Institute and Lehigh University. He received a Bachelor of Laws from Columbian University School of Law (now George Washington University Law School) in 1889, and a Master of Laws from the same institution in 1890. He was in private practice in Washington, D.C., from 1891 to 1921. He was President of the District of Columbia Bar Association from 1916 to 1917. During World War I he served as a major in the Judge Advocate General's Corps, and was counsel to the District of Columbia draft board.

== Federal judicial service ==
Hoehling was nominated by President Warren G. Harding on June 6, 1921, to an Associate Justice seat on the Supreme Court of the District of Columbia (now the United States District Court for the District of Columbia) vacated by Associate Justice Ashley Mulgrave Gould. He was confirmed by the United States Senate on June 13, 1921, and received his commission the same day. His service terminated on December 31, 1927, due to his resignation.

=== First inauguration of Calvin Coolidge ===
On August 21, 1923, Hoehling re-administered the Presidential oath of office to Calvin Coolidge. Hoehling kept the second swearing in a secret until confirming Harry M. Daugherty's revelation of it in 1932. When Hoehling confirmed Daugherty's story, he indicated that Daugherty, then serving as United States Attorney General, asked him to administer the oath at the Willard Hotel. According to Hoehling, he did not question Daugherty's reason for requesting a second oath taking, but assumed it was to resolve any doubt about whether the first swearing in was valid, since an oath for a federal office had been administered by Coolidge's father, a Vermont notary public and justice of the peace.

== Later career and death ==
After his resignation from the federal bench, Hoehling returned to private practice in Washington, D.C. He died in Washington, D.C., on February 17, 1941, and was buried at Arlington National Cemetery, Section West, Site 155B.

== Family ==
On June 9, 1906, Hoehling married Louise Gilbert Carrington (1882–1968) of New Jersey. They were the parents of three children.

== Sources ==
Legal offices
Preceded by Ashley Mulgrave Gould	Associate Justice of the Supreme Court of the District of Columbia; 1921–1927	Succeeded by Peyton Gordon
