= Matthew Francis McGuire =

American judge

Senior Judge of the United States District Court for the District of Columbia
- In office October 7, 1966 – January 24, 1986

Chief Judge of the United States District Court for the District of Columbia
- In office 1961–1966
- Preceded by: David Andrew Pine
- Succeeded by: Richmond Bowling Keech

Judge of the United States District Court for the District of Columbia
- In office August 1, 1941 – October 7, 1966
- Appointed by: Franklin D. Roosevelt
- Preceded by: Peyton Gordon
- Succeeded by: Aubrey Eugene Robinson Jr.

Personal details
- Born: Matthew Francis McGuire; May 30, 1898 St. John's, Newfoundland, Canada
- Died: January 24, 1986 (aged 87) Washington, D.C., U.S.
- Education: College of the Holy Cross (BA); Boston University (LLB)

Matthew Francis McGuire (May 30, 1898 – January 24, 1986) was a United States district judge of the United States District Court for the District of Columbia.

== Education and career ==
Born in St. John's, Newfoundland, (Note: Newfoundland would not become part of Canada until 1933.) McGuire earned his Bachelor of Arts degree from the College of the Holy Cross in 1921 and a Bachelor of Laws from the Boston University School of Law in 1926. He was in the United States Navy in 1918. He entered private practice in Boston, Massachusetts in 1926. He served in the United States Department of Justice from 1934 to 1941, as a special assistant to the Attorney General of the United States from 1934 to 1939, and as an Assistant to the Attorney General of the United States from 1940 to 1941.

== Federal judicial service ==
McGuire was nominated by President Franklin D. Roosevelt on July 14, 1941, to an Associate Justice seat on the District Court of the United States for the District of Columbia (Judge of the United States District Court for the District of Columbia from June 25, 1948) vacated by Associate Justice Peyton Gordon. He was confirmed by the United States Senate on July 29, 1941, and received his commission on August 1, 1941. He served as Chief Judge from 1961 to 1966 and as a member of the Judicial Conference of the United States from 1961 to 1967. He assumed senior status on October 7, 1966. His service terminated on January 24, 1986, due to his death in Washington, D.C.

== See also ==
- List of United States federal judges by longevity of service

== Sources ==
Legal offices
Preceded by Peyton Gordon	Judge of the United States District Court for the District of Columbia; 1941–1966	Succeeded by Aubrey Eugene Robinson Jr.
Preceded by David Andrew Pine	Chief Judge of the United States District Court for the District of Columbia; 1961–1966	Succeeded by Richmond Bowling Keech
