= Pennhurst State School and Hospital =

- Pennhurst Memorial & Preservation Alliance
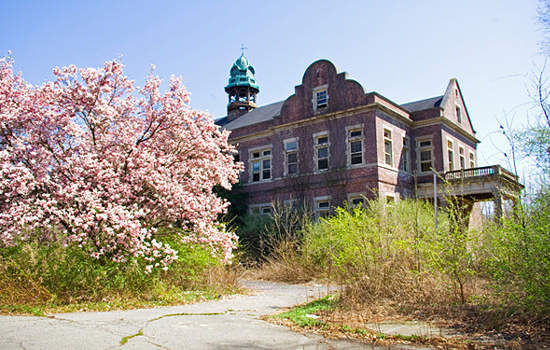

- Location within Pennsylvania

Geography
- Location: Spring City, Pennsylvania, United States
- Coordinates: 40.193717°N 75.560162°W

Organization
- Care system: Private
- Type: Specialist

Services
- Standards: Psychiatric hospital
- Beds: 3,350 (1950)
- Speciality: Care of the physically and mentally disabled

Helipads
- Helipad: No

History
- Founded: November 23, 1908
- Closed: December 9, 1987

Links
- Website: www.preservepennhurst.org
- Lists: Hospitals in Pennsylvania
- Building details
- Former names: Eastern State Institution for the Feeble-Minded and Epileptic
- Alternative names: Pennhurst School

General information
- Status: Partially operational – private property
- Type: Previous: Hospital Current: Museum & tourist attraction
- Architectural style: Jacobean Revival
- Elevation: 233 feet (71 m)
- Current tenants: Pennhurst Memorial & Preservation Alliance
- Owner: Commonwealth of Pennsylvania

Technical details
- Material: Brick, steel, and concrete (all buildings)
- Floor count: List of building count: Administration Building – 4; Assembly Building – 4; Devon Hall – 5; Kitchens/Dining Halls – 4; Hershey Hall – 5; Hospital – 4; Industry Halls – 4; Laundry Facilities – 4; Limerick Hall – 5; Mayflower Hall – 5; Penn Hall – 4; Philadelphia Hall – 4; Quaker Hall – 4; Rockwell Hall – 4; Tinicum Hall – 4; Union Hall – 5; Vincennes Hall – 5; Superintendent's Residence – 3
- Floor area: Total area: 636,454 sq ft (59,128.5 m^{2}) List of buildings area: Administration Building – 29,128 sq ft (2,706.1 m^{2}); Assembly Building – 27,102 sq ft (2,517.9 m^{2}); Devon Hall – 103,840 sq ft (9,647 m^{2}); Kitchens/Dining Halls – unknown; Hershey Hall – 29,128 sq ft (2,706.1 m^{2}); Hospital – 86,632 sq ft (8,048.4 m^{2}); Industry Halls – 23,182 sq ft (2,153.7 m^{2}); Laundry Facilities – 42,872 sq ft (3,982.9 m^{2}); Limerick Hall – 43,270 sq ft (4,020 m^{2}); Mayflower Hall – 45,740 sq ft (4,249 m^{2}); Penn Hall – 34,208 sq ft (3,178.0 m^{2}); Philadelphia Hall – 14,448 sq ft (1,342.3 m^{2}); Quaker Hall – 27,440 sq ft (2,549 m^{2}); Rockwell Hall – 25,200 sq ft (2,340 m^{2}); Tinicum Hall – 32,628 sq ft (3,031.2 m^{2}); Union Hall – 31,708 sq ft (2,945.8 m^{2}); Vincennes Hall – 36,600 sq ft (3,400 m^{2}); Superintendent's Residence – 3,460 sq ft (321 m^{2}); Haunted House - 4,640 sq ft (431 m^{2})
- Lifts/elevators: 1 (Hospital)
- Grounds: At open: 112 acres (45 ha) At close: 1,400 acres (570 ha)

Pennhurst State School and Hospital, originally known as the Eastern Pennsylvania State Institution for the Feeble-Minded and Epileptic, was a state-run institution for mentally and physically disabled individuals of Southeastern Pennsylvania located in Spring City. After 79 years of controversy, it closed on December 9, 1987.

== History ==
=== Overview ===
In 1903, the Pennsylvania Legislature authorized the creation of the Eastern State Institution for the Feeble-Minded and Epileptic and a commission was organized to take into consideration the number and status of the feeble-minded and epileptic persons in the state and determine a placement for construction to care for these residents. This commission discovered 1,146 feeble-minded persons in insane hospitals and 2,627 in almshouses, county-care hospitals, reformatories, and prisons, who were in immediate need of specialized institutional care.

The legislation stated that the buildings would be in two groups, one for the educational and industrial department, and one for the custodial or asylum department. The institution was required to accommodate no fewer than five hundred inmates or patients, with room for additions. Wesley White, previous president of the American Association on Intellectual and Developmental Disabilities, formerly known as the American Association on Mental Deficiency, was appointed superintendent of the facility.

== Construction and design ==
=== Building designation ===
From 1903 to 1908, the first buildings were constructed on 633.913 acres (256.535 ha) of Crab Hill in Spring City, Pennsylvania, Chester County on what was referred to as the lower campus. Of the first few buildings constructed, 'F' was the girl's dining room, 'G' was the kitchen and storeroom, 'H', 'I' and 'K' were cottages for girls, 'N' was the boys' dining room, 'P' was the teacher's home, 'Q', T', 'U' and 'V' were cottages for boys, 'R' was a school, 'W' was laundry and sewing, and 'X' was the power house.

'P' was used as a temporary administration building until the institution's opening in 1918 along with the opening of 'L' and 'M' in 1919. In 1921, Whitman and Wilson I and II were constructed along with Penn Hall for employee housing; in 1929, the assembly building was complete and functioned as the gymnasium and auditorium.

The buildings on lower campus are currently labeled with letters such as 'F', 'I', 'K', 'P', 'Q', 'R', 'N', 'U', 'V', 'T', 'W' and 'X' with names later assigned in the 1960s (see below).

In 1930, the first buildings on the upper campus, otherwise known as the female colony, were completed and named Pershing, Buchanan, Audubon and Keystone. Capitol Hall was erected after World War II along with Devon constructed on lower campus. Horizon Hall opened later in 1971.

==== Lower campus buildings ====
Administration, Philadelphia, Quaker, Rockwell, Franklin, Nobel, Union, Vincennes, Tinicum, Industry, Penn, Devon, Mayflower, Limerick, Assembly, Storeroom, Laundry, Whitman, Wilson I, Wilson II, Hershey

(Rockwell, Nobel, Franklin and Hershey were all demolished in 2020)

==== Upper campus buildings ====
Pershing, Buchanan, Audubon, Keystone, Capitol, Horizon

(Buchanan, Audubon, Keystone, Capital were demolished in 2018)

=== Appearance ===
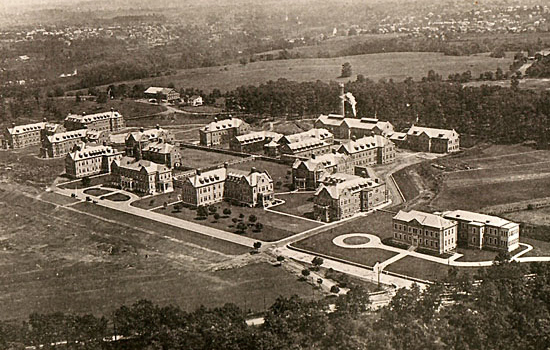
Birds Eye View of Campus, 1934

The older buildings, designed by Phillip H. Johnson, were two-storied, and made of red brick, terra cotta, and granite trimmings. They were connected by fire-proof tunnels with walkways on top of the tunnels for the use of transporting residents, with a parallel steam piping system, and were distributed on the 1,400-acre (570 ha) campus in the cottage plan formation. The buildings were designed to provide a large number of small rooms occupied by two to three beds, a few small dormitories with eight to ten beds, and a large day room for exercise. George Lovatt was the architect for several of the buildings constructed post-1937.

The central administration building had two side porte-cocheres, a front portico and a copper cupola in the center of the roof. The hospital building, Whitman, and Wilson I and II were not tunnel-connected, nor was Penn Hall and the power house. The remaining cottage buildings are L- and I-shaped with the exception of dietary, which was Y-shaped, and Devon Hall, which was H-shaped.

=== Railroad ===
The Pennsylvania Railroad created a Pennhurst Station on its Schuylkill Division. Coal and other supplies were delivered by rail. Tracks are still visible under the pavement behind dietary and Devon Hall, which allowed boxcars to be brought directly onto the main campus. The railroad tracks have been removed and are now part of the Schuylkill River Trail.

== General operation ==
=== Opening ===
On November 23, 1908, "Patient number 1" was admitted to the hospital. Within four years of operation, Pennhurst was overcrowded and under pressure to admit immigrants, orphans, and criminals.

=== Classification ===
Residents were classified into mental categories of imbecile or insane, into physical categories of epileptic or healthy, and into dental categories of good, poor, or treated when admitted.

=== Industries ===
Residents were assigned to mattress-making, shoemaking and repair, grading, farming, laundry, domestic duties, sewing, baking, butchering, painting, and working in the store.

== Segregation and eugenics ==
In 1913, the legislature appointed a Commission for the Care of the Feeble-Minded which stated that disabled people were unfit for citizenship and posed a menace to the peace, and thus recommended a program of custodial care. To a further extent, the Commission desired to prevent the intermixing of the genes of those imprisoned with the general population. In the Biennial Report to the Legislature submitted by the Board of Trustees, Pennhurst's Chief Physician quoted Henry H. Goddard, a leading eugenicist, as follows:

Every feeble-minded person is a potential criminal. The general public, although more convinced today than ever before that it is a good thing to segregate the idiot or the distinct imbecile, they have not as yet been convinced as to the proper treatment of the defective delinquent, which is the brighter and more dangerous individual.

=== Treatment of women ===
In 1916, the Board of Trustees initiated a plan to construct cottages specifically for women to segregate them from the men, in part to prevent pregnancies.

== Conditions exposed ==
In 1968, conditions at Pennhurst were exposed in a five-part television news report anchored by local WCAU-TV correspondent Bill Baldini.

In 1981, a Time magazine article described the place as having "a history of being understaffed, dirty and violent." In 1983, nine employees were indicted on charges ranging from slapping and beating patients (including some in wheelchairs) to arranging for patients to assault each other.

The Halderman Case, which resulted in the closure of the institution, also detailed widespread patient abuse.

== Closure ==
In 1977, U.S. District Judge Raymond J. Broderick ruled that the conditions at Pennhurst State School violated patients' constitutional rights. The lawsuit that led to his ruling was filed May 30, 1974, by Philadelphia attorney David Ferleger representing the patients. The suit was later joined by the United States and by the Pennsylvania Association for Retarded Citizens. The facility was ultimately closed in 1987. The 1,156 people who lived there on the date of the Court's order (March 17, 1978) moved into small community homes called Community Living Arrangements. These settings supported three or fewer people, with 24 hour staffing if needed. This process of deinstitutionalization required nine years, and included discussion of treatment plans with each person and family.

=== Halderman v. Pennhurst State School and Hospital ===
The allegations of abuse led to the first lawsuit of its kind in the United States, a federal class action, Pennhurst State School and Hospital v. Halderman, which asserted that those with developmental disabilities in the care of the state have a constitutional right to appropriate care and education. Terri Lee Halderman had been a resident of Pennhurst, and following multiple episodes of abuse, she and her family filed suit in the federal district court. The suit started after Halderman had visited her parents at home and was found to have unexplained bruises. Although the case was not expected to reach the level it did, the courts later found that conditions at Pennhurst were unsanitary, inhumane and dangerous, violating the Fourteenth Amendment, and that Pennhurst used cruel and unusual punishment in violation of the Eighth and Fourteenth Amendments, as well as the Pennsylvania Mental Health and Retardation Act of 1966 (MH/MR). The District Court ruled that certain of the patients' rights had been violated. The District Court decision was the first time that any federal court ruled that an institution must be closed based on a constitutional right to community services.

The rulings collectively lent credence to the nascent "deinstitutionalization" movement, which sought to move mental patients from hospitals to halfway houses or reintegrate them into their families. The rulings also aligned with the increasing tendency of federal courts to take control of school districts, prisons and other state institutions in order to enforce citizens' rights. Ultimately, however, the U.S. Supreme Court vacated the judgment based on the Eleventh Amendment principle that federal courts cannot order state officials to comply with state laws. As noted below, the institution was eventually closed pursuant to a settlement agreement that required that community-based services be offered to all of its residents.

The case became an important rule of law known as the Pennhurst Doctrine, which has been cited by state attorneys general as binding precedent under United States constitutional law.

== Modern day ==
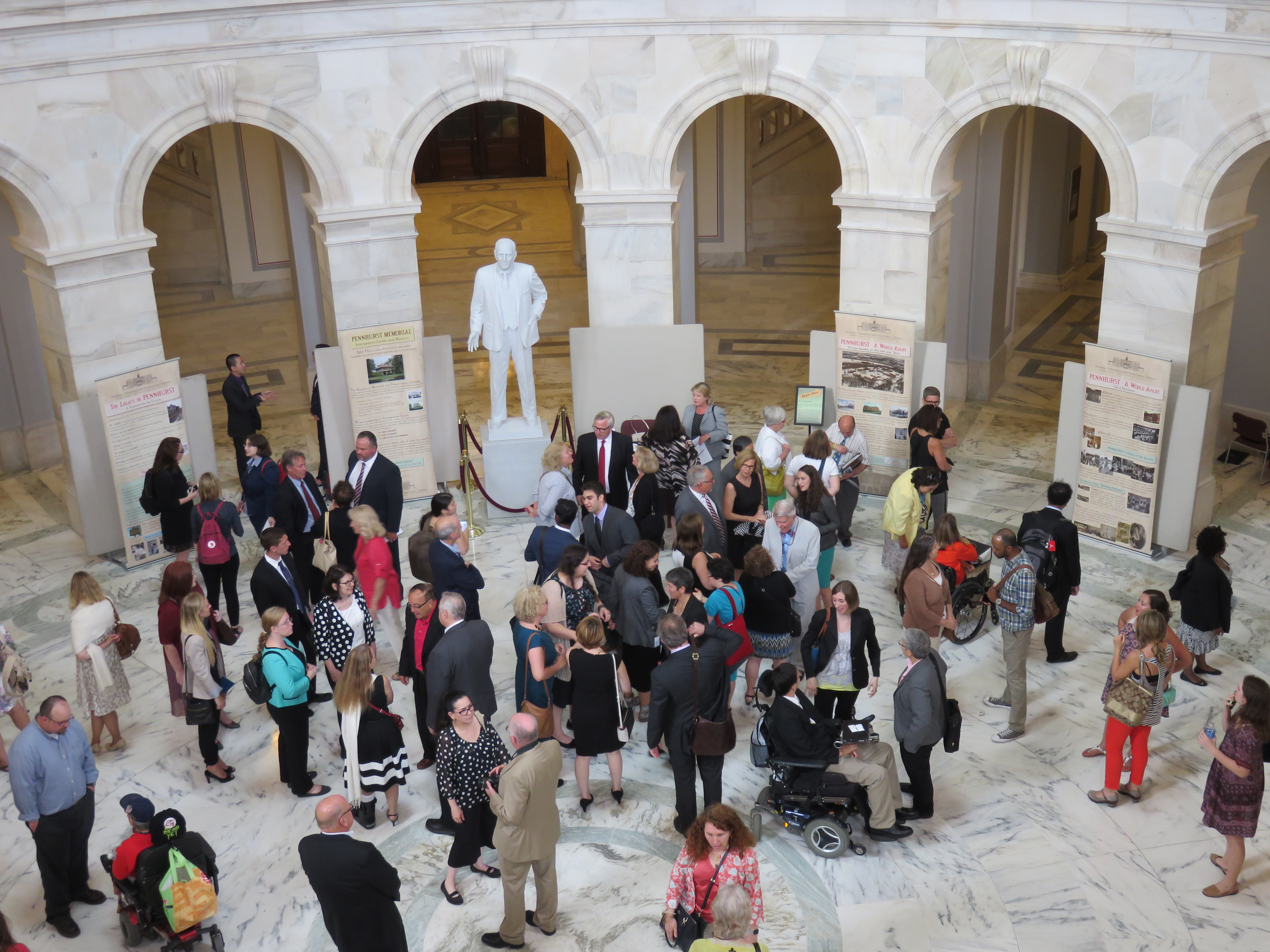
The Pennhurst Memorial and Preservation Alliance traveling exhibit on display in the Russell Senate Office Building rotunda, Washington, D.C., June 27, 2016

The United States Department of Veterans Affairs acquired the upper campus and began work to renovate it as a veterans' home. In 1986, the upper campus cottage units reopened as the Southeastern Veterans' Center. In 1990, renovations began on Horizon Hall, one of the newest buildings at Pennhurst, as part of a project to establish a nursing facility at the veterans' center. It reopened in 1993 as Coates Hall. After many years of determining what to do with Pennhurst, Congressman Jim Gerlach sought to establish a Federal veteran's cemetery at Pennhurst in 2003 but the VA rejected the proposal.

In 2001, the state adopted the Keystone Principles concerning the state's duties to maintain historic property and to consult with the Pennsylvania Historical and Museum Commission before transferring the property into private hands. Chester County officials approved a private development and Pennhurst was sold to a developer, Pennhurst Associates, for two million dollars. The Pennhurst Memorial and Preservation Alliance (PMPA) was formed to advocate for certain uses of the site.

Pennhurst was added to Pennsylvania's list of the most at-risk Pennsylvania properties as well as the International Coalition of Sites of Conscience, a worldwide network of historic sites specifically dedicated to remembering struggles for justice.

In partnership with the Preservation Alliance for Greater Philadelphia, PMPA obtained a grant to complete a re-use design and feasibility study of the Pennhurst campus. By 2010, the administration building had been partially renovated and reopened as the Pennhurst Asylum seasonal haunted attraction. The attraction has been successful, though controversial among locals and those previously affiliated with Pennhurst.

Penn Organic Recycling LLC operated on 4.5-acre (1.8 ha) of Pennhurst, offering topping, composting and food waste services. The Department of Environmental Protection permitted the composting operation at Pennhurst to maintain no more than 25 tons. It is no longer in operation.

In 2015, the Pennhurst Memorial and Preservation Alliance began working with the Southeastern Veterans' Center to obtain the superintendent's residence for a future museum and interpretive center.

By the end of 2016, demolition had begun on some of the buildings on the upper campus.

In 2017, bookings for daytime history tours, photography tours, and overnight paranormal investigations became available through the haunted attraction's website. Proceeds from the tours go towards the upkeep of the grounds and restoration of the remaining buildings.

By 2020, Hershey, Rockwell, and Dietary halls were all deemed unsafe for reuse. That March, demolition began and by November, all three buildings had been demolished.

== In popular culture ==
A fictional version of Pennhurst appears in the 2019 film Scary Stories to Tell in the Dark, which was filmed at the abandoned St. Thomas Psychiatric Hospital in Ontario, Canada.

Pennhurst also appears in James McBride’s novel, ‘’The Heaven & Earth Grocery Store’’, published in 2023.

The Travel Channel's television show Destination Fear filmed at the location for the fifth episode of their first season in 2019 .

Pennhurst was the basis for a fictional asylum (also named Pennhurst) that appears in the fourth season of the Netflix series Stranger Things.

The documentary 2023 Pennhurst directed by Jodie Alexandra Taylor features interviews with former residents and staff; along with archival footage.

World’s Biggest Ghost Hunt: Pennhurst Asylum (2019) is an A&E made-for-television movie that follows an investigative team on a 2-week mission covering paranormal happenings on the 110-acre grounds.

Sophomore album The Unnatural World by American rock band Have a Nice Life features the song "Cropsey", which begins with clips of Bill Baldini's 1968 exposé.

Inside Pennhurst Institution: Understanding Disabilities Through The Decades is a 2024 documentary featured on the Only Human series.
