= Pennhurst State School and Hospital v. Halderman =

- Supreme Court of the United States

Argued February 22, 1983 Reargued October 3, 1983 Decided January 23, 1984
- Full case name: Pennhurst State School and Hospital v. Halderman
- Docket no.: 81-2101
- Citations: 465 U.S. 89 (more) 104 S. Ct. 900; 79 L. Ed. 2d 67
- Argument: Oral argument
- Reargument: Reargument

Court membership
- Chief Justice Warren E. Burger Associate Justices William J. Brennan Jr. · Byron White; Thurgood Marshall · Harry Blackmun; Lewis F. Powell Jr. · William Rehnquist; John P. Stevens · Sandra Day O'Connor

Case opinions
- Majority: Powell, joined by Burger, White, Rehnquist, O'Connor
- Dissent: Stevens, joined by Brennan, Marshall, Blackmun
- Dissent: Brennan

Laws applied
- U.S. Const. amend. XI; Developmentally Disabled Assistance and Bill of Rights Act of 1975

Pennhurst State School and Hospital v. Halderman, 465 U.S. 89 (1984), was a United States Supreme Court decision holding that the Eleventh Amendment prohibits a federal court from ordering state officials to obey state law.

== Background ==
The lawsuit was a federal class action, asserting that those with developmental disabilities in the care of the state have a constitutional right to appropriate care and education. Terri Lee Halderman had been a resident of Pennhurst State School and Hospital, and following multiple episodes of abuse, she and her family filed suit in the federal district court. The suit started after Halderman had visited her parents at home and was found to have unexplained bruises. Although the case was not expected to reach the level it did, the courts later found that conditions at Pennhurst were unsanitary, inhumane and dangerous, violating the Fourteenth Amendment, and that Pennhurst used cruel and unusual punishment in violation of the Eighth and Fourteenth Amendments, as well as the Pennsylvania Mental Health and Retardation Act of 1966 (MH/MR). The District Court ruled that certain of the patients' rights had been violated. The District Court decision was the first time that any federal court ruled that an institution must be closed based on a constitutional right to community services.

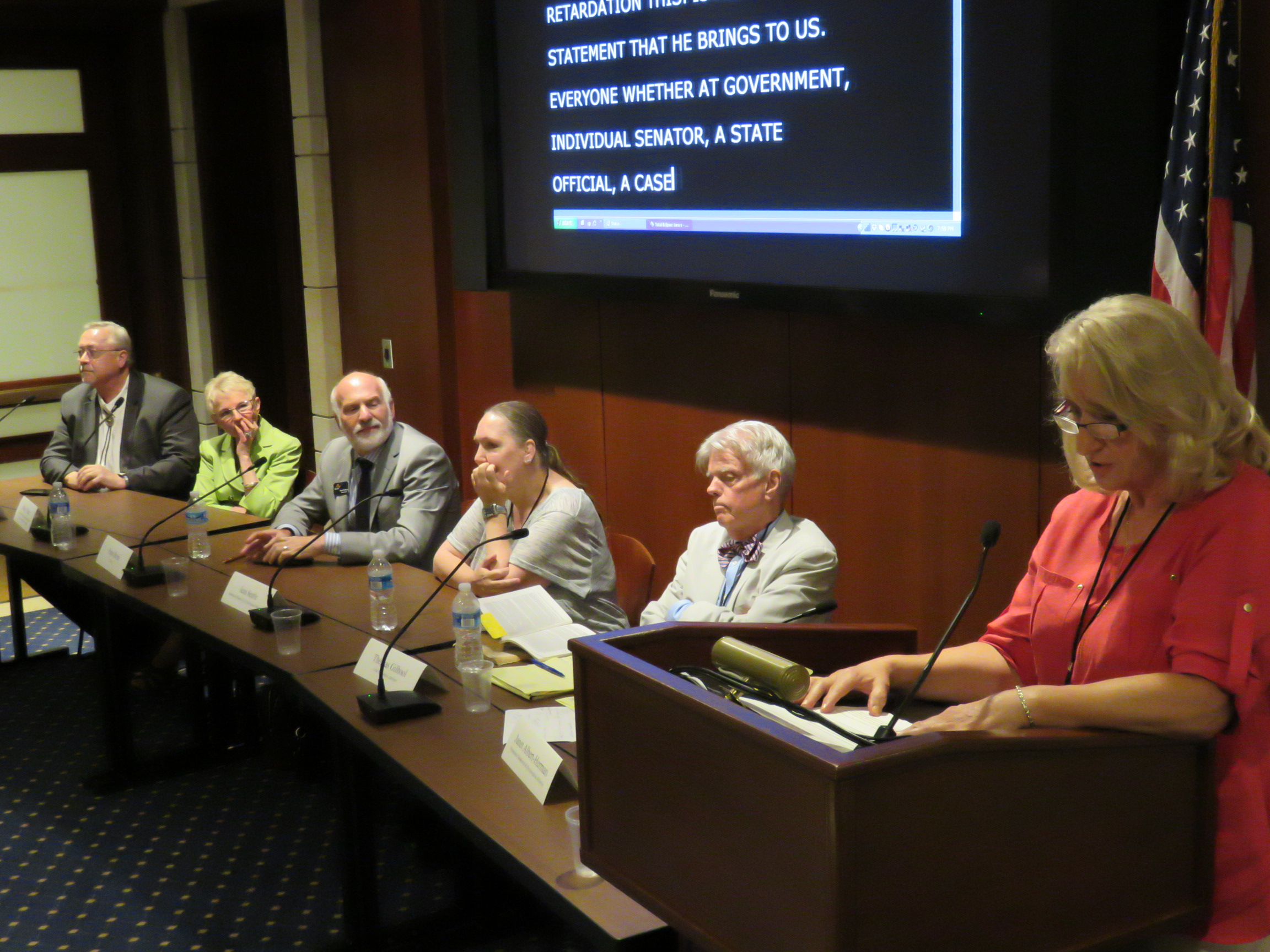
Panel discussion, "The Disability Rights Movement: From Pennhurst Until Today", U.S. Capitol Visitor Center, Washington, D.C., 27 June 2016. Left to right: James W. Conroy, principal investigator on the Pennhurst Longitudinal Study and co-president of the Pennhurst Memorial and Preservation Alliance; Nancy Thaler, Deputy Secretary, Pennsylvania Department of Human Services; Peter Berns, chief executive officer, the Arc of the United States; Jean Searle, member of the Pennhurst class and co-president of the Pennhurst Memorial and Preservation Alliance; Thomas Gilhool, Public Interest Law Center of Philadelphia and lead plaintiff's attorney in Pennhurst v. Halderman; Janet Albert-Herman, a board member of the Arc of Pennsylvania and Treasurer of the Pennhurst Memorial and Preservation Alliance.

== Bibliography ==
Court documents

Law journal analyses

- Boyd, Penelope A. (1981). "The Aftermath of the DD Act: Is there Life after Pennhurst?". University of Arkansas at Little Rock Law Journal. 4 (3). University of Arkansas at Little Rock, Bowen School of Law: 448–466.
- Brant, Jonathan (1983). "Pennhurst, Romeo, and Rogers: The Burger Court and Mental Health Law Reform Litigation". The Journal of Legal Medicine. 4 (3): 323–348. doi:10.1080/01947648309513387. PMID 6605401.
- Brant, Jonathan (1983). "The Hostility of the Burger Court to Mental Health Law Reform Litigation". Bulletin of the American Academy of Psychiatry and the Law. 11 (1): 77–90. PMID 6850110.
- Chemerinsky, Erwin (Summer 1985). "State Sovereignty and Federal Court Power: The Eleventh Amendment after Pennhurst v. Halderman" (PDF). Hastings Constitutional Law Quarterly. 12 (4). University of California, Hastings College of the Law: 643–668. Archived from the original (PDF) on October 16, 2015.
- Ferleger, David; Boyd, Penelope A. (April 1979). "Anti-Institutionalization: The Promise of the Pennhurst Case". Stanford Law Review. 31 (4). Stanford Law School: 717–752. doi:10.2307/1228423. JSTOR 1228423. PMID 10242374.
- Ferleger, David; Scott, Patrice Maguire (1983). "Rights and Dignity: Congress, the Supreme Court, and People with Disabilities after Pennhurst". Western New England Law Review. 5 (3). Western New England University School of Law: 327–361. PMID 11658602.
- Smith, Peter J. (May 2001). "Penshurst, Chevron, and the Spending Power". Yale Law Journal. 110 (7). The Yale Law Journal Company, Inc.: 1, 187–1, 245. doi:10.2307/797527. JSTOR 797527. S2CID 53607082.

Journalism

- "Pennsylvania Settles Key Suit on Facilities for the Retarded". New York Times. July 15, 1984.
- Levey, Noam N. (February 25, 2015). "The Conservative Ruling that Might Save Obamacare". Los Angeles Times. Los Angeles, Cal.
- McIntyre, Adrianna (March 3, 2015). "Understanding 'Pennhurst': The Legal Doctrine that Could Save Obamacare". VOX.

Other sources

- Conroy, James W.; Bradley, Valerie (March 1, 1985). The Pennhurst Longitudinal Study: A Report of Five Years Research and Analysis (Report). Philadelphia, Penn.: Temple University Developmental Disabilities Center.
