= Mills v. Board of Education of District of Columbia =

- Court: United States District Court for the District of Columbia
- Full case name: Peter Mills et al. v. Board of Education of District of Columbia et al.
- Decided: August 1, 1972
- Docket nos.: Civ. A. No. 1939-71
- Citation: 348 F. Supp. 866

Court membership
- Judge sitting: Joseph Cornelius Waddy

Mills v. Board of Education of District of Columbia, 348 F. Supp. 866 (D.D.C. 1972), was a lawsuit filed against the District of Columbia in the United States District Court for the District of Columbia. The court ruled that students with disabilities must be given a public education even if the students are unable to pay for the cost of the education. The case established that "all children are entitled to free public education and training appropriate to their learning capacities". Peter D. Roos, a former staff attorney at Harvard University's Center for Law and Education, described Mills as a "leading case" in a series of lawsuits that attempted to provide access to education for children with disabilities. Mills v. Board was a certified class action lawsuit under Rule 23(b)(1) and (2). These subsections identify a violation of the right to equal treatment under law in a way that would obstruct the ability to protect one's interest as an individual member of a common class. Additionally, subsection b(2) describes a case with refusal of the opposing party to rectify the transgression to a degree that merits corrective adjudication. This was a broad interpretation of the 14th Amendment due process clause of law and was used to make changes to local school district policy.

Children were denied educational opportunities because they were considered to be "exceptional" which included "mentally retarded, emotionally disturbed, physically handicapped, hyperactive and other children with behavioral problems". The seven plaintiffs were all children that couldn't obtain privately funded education and their representatives called for students to be given proper accommodations for public education. The Board of Education did not provide adequate schooling for these children, which violated their own board regulations. 18,000 similar cases were discovered in the Washington D.C. area at the time. It had failed to provide due process hearings and periodic reviews of each exceptional student case. D.C.'s board of education claimed it would take "millions of dollars" to create conditions in the school district to adequately provide education for all exceptional students. The court disagreed, and they ordered the district to serve all students, regardless of disability, in a lengthy and thorough decree. The judge ruled that public education as well as suitable alternatives, be paid for by the Board of Education regardless of the price. They were to distribute all available resources equally in order to make accommodations for disabled students in the district in order to ensure that the burden of the lack of funds was not "permitted to bear more heavily" on children with mental or physical handicaps.

In December 1971, the settlement agreed to make changes. Since the school board was not able to fulfill the requirements, Judge Joseph Cornelius Waddy said in his order that the board must do the three of the following: name 4 of class representative with publicly funded education, name everyone in the Mills class and provide them publicly funded education, and provide more funding for special education programs and mentors.
