= Josie Jackson =

20th-century American politician

Josie J. Jackson was an American state legislator in Colorado. She served as a Republican in the Colorado House of Representatives from 1921–1922 and 1925–1926 terms representing Denver County. She was sworn in by Colorado Supreme Court justice George W. Allen in January 1921. In 1925, she chaired the Committee on Enrollment.

Jackson belonged to the Ku Klux Klan and in 1926 joined the Minute Women.
