= Mall 205 =

Shopping mall in Portland, Oregon, United States

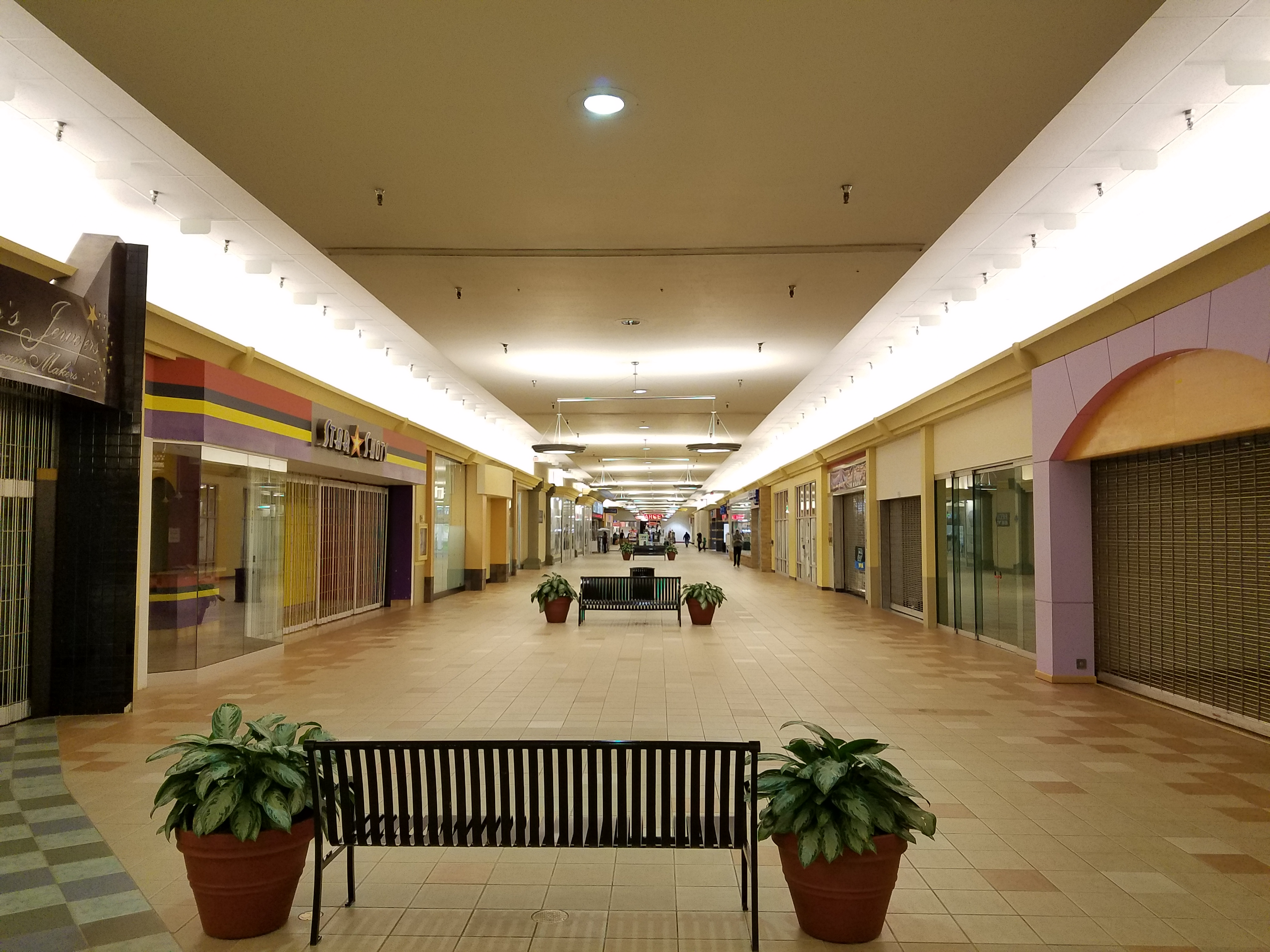
- Mall 205 in 2018
- Location: Portland, Oregon, United States
- Coordinates: 45.517°N 122.561°W
- Opened: 1970
- Closed: 2022
- Owner: Rhino Investments
- Architect: Victor Gruen
- Num. of stores: 40+
- Num. of anchor tenants: 4
- Floor area: 477,000 sq ft (44,300 m^{2})
- Floors: 1 (2 in Target)

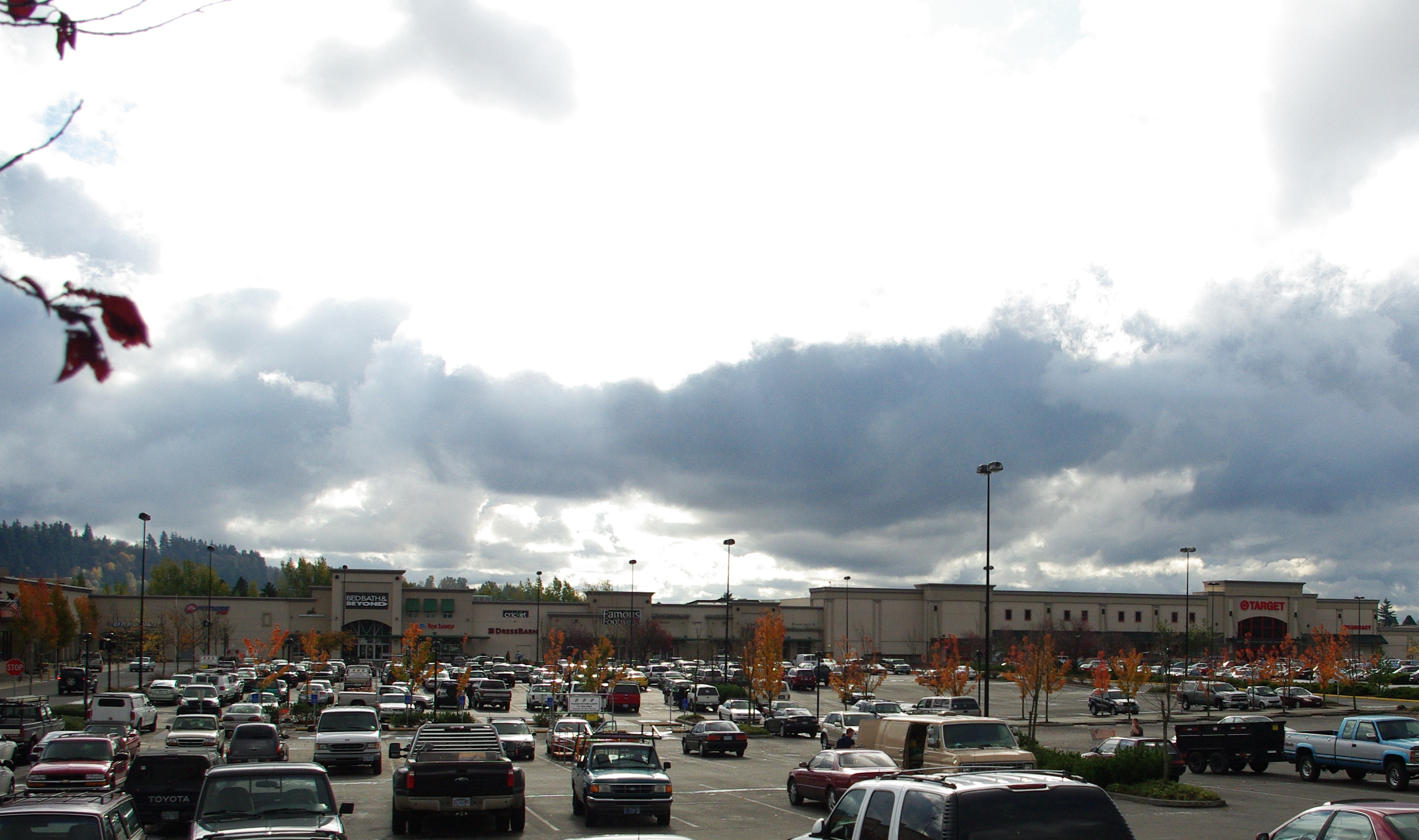
Exterior of the mall

Mall 205 was an enclosed shopping mall located at the junction of Interstate 205 and S.E. Washington Street in Portland, Oregon's Hazelwood neighborhood, in the United States. The mall featured over 20 stores and a food court; anchor stores include The Home Depot, Oregon DMV, Target, Arch Fitters and 24 Hour Fitness. The mall's two-story Target store was the largest Target in the state of Oregon. Mall 205 was acquired and renovated in 2001 by CenterCal properties.

== History ==
The site was formerly the location of Morningside Hospital, which closed in 1968. New York-based developer Lenrich Associates announced plans for "Mall 205", an enclosed shopping center with 50 stores that would cost $10 million, in March 1969 and construction began on June 12, 1969. It opened in September 1970 with Montgomery Ward and White Front as its anchor stores. White Front closed in June 1974 and was replaced with mall space, but in 1978 Emporium and Pay Less Drug Stores opened new stores in the former White Front space. Otherwise, the mall remained mostly unchanged throughout the 1990s, despite competition from Clackamas Town Center, a larger mall which opened just a few miles away in 1981.

A 75,000-square-foot (7,000 m^{2}) multi-screen movie theater and food court were originally planned for inclusion in a 1996 expansion of Mall 205.

In early 2001, Montgomery Ward and Emporium both closed the last of their stores, leaving both of the anchor spaces vacant at Mall 205. As a result, many inline tenants began to leave the mall. Center Oak Properties of Gresham, Oregon (now known as CenterCal Properties) acquired the mall the same year and began a $20 million renovation, adding a two-level Target store on the site of the former Montgomery Ward, and the Home Depot opened on the site of the former Emporium. Center Oak also added many other tenants to the mall, including Arch Fitters, Bed Bath & Beyond, 24 Hour Fitness, Circuit City, and Famous Footwear. The center was sold again in July 2014 to Gerrity in a $76.5 million deal that included the neighboring Plaza 205.

In January 2022, the mall was sold to Rhino Investments Group at a price of $43.2 million. This includes the adjacent Plaza 205. Target owns their store and parking lot and was not part of the sale. By March 31, 2022, both Target and Home Depot had walled off their interior mall entrances, and the last two interior mall tenants had closed their stores inside the mall to make way for redevelopment. Two proposed new stores are Hobby Lobby and Burlington.

== See also ==
- List of shopping malls in Oregon
