= Morningside Hospital (Oregon) =

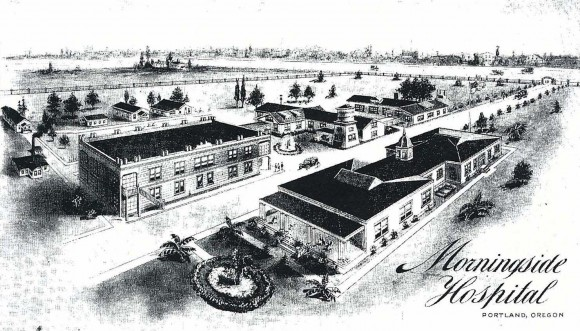
- Promotional postcard from 1925

Geography
- Location: Portland, Multnomah County, Oregon, United States
- Coordinates: 45.518962°N 122.562131°W

Organization
- Type: Specialist

Services
- Specialty: Psychiatric hospital

History
- Founded: 1883; 143 years ago
- Closed: 1968; 58 years ago

Links
- Website: www.morningsidehospital.com
- Lists: Hospitals in Oregon

Morningside Hospital was a psychiatric hospital in Portland, Oregon, United States. The hospital was contracted to provide care for people committed to psychiatric hospitals from Alaska from 1904 to 1960.

For nearly sixty years the hospital sat on a 47-acre parcel at the junction of SE Stark Street and 96th Avenue. Formerly agricultural land, the site was developed as a psychiatric hospital complex and working farm in 1910. In 1970 the site was redeveloped as a shopping mall and Adventist Medical Center.

== History ==
=== Origins and establishment ===
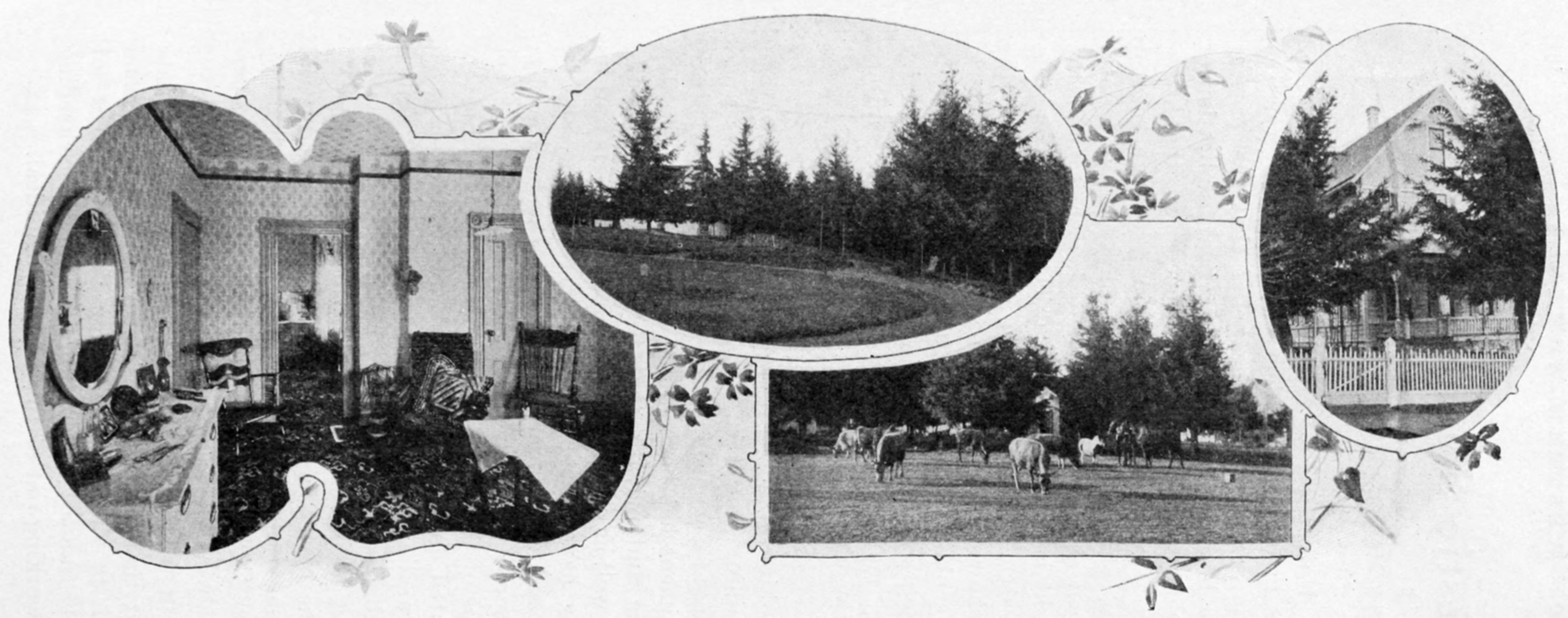
The Crystal Springs Sanitarium at the top of Mt. Tabor in 1905.

The hospital was founded in 1883 by Dr. Henry Waldo Coe. In 1905, Coe purchased a building from the Lewis and Clark Exposition and moved it from the exposition site in Northwest Portland to Mt. Tabor, where it was converted into a psychiatric hospital. Five years later, Dr. Coe moved operations to its final location. During its early years, the hospital went by several names including Dr. Coe's Nervous Sanitarium, Mindease, Mt. Tabor Sanitarium and Crystal Springs Sanitarium.

In 1904, Morningside was awarded a contract from the U.S. Department of the Interior to care for people who were mentally ill and/or had developmental disabilities from the territory of Alaska, who would constitute the bulk of the hospital's patients throughout its tenure. Patients had previously been sent to the Oregon Insane Asylum. Between 1905 and 1968, nearly 5,000 patients were admitted to Morningside, not including the roughly 40 admitted monthly on behalf of Multnomah County, which used the hospital for emergency care.

A report chronicled hospital admittances from 1904-1916: "A total of 576 patients were admitted during that time, with 33.3% or 192 still in the hospital, 21% died while there, 37.7% were discharged, 7.2% eloped, and 0.3% or two persons were deported from the US." From other patient data, the Lost Alaskans Project found that initially miners and other white adults were sent to Morningside, but later on, it was more likely to be Alaska Natives and children who were sent.

After Dr. Henry Waldo Coe's death in 1927, Morningside was taken over by his son, Wayne Coe. Although not a medical doctor, Wayne Coe acted as hospital administrator and eventually as Chairman of the Henry Waldo Coe Foundation.

=== Criticism and decline ===
In 1955, Morningside came under attack after a bill was introduced by U.S. Rep. Edith Green (D) of Oregon, to transfer care of Alaskan patients to Alaska. Questions of financial impropriety raised during hearings led to an investigation of the hospital by the U.S. General Accounting Office in 1956. By this time, Wayne Coe's son Henry Coe, had entered the family business. The Coes were accused of using hospital funds for personal expenses, including trips to South Africa and Mexico, a beach property in Gearhart and a ranch in Stanfield, Oregon. The Coes were also accused of "outrageous abuse of privilege" including the use of patient labor for home and hospital building and maintenance, under the guise of occupational therapy. The Coes denied the charges, defended the hospital practices and called the investigation "rude, uncivil and insulting." Ultimately, no criminal charges were filed and Morningside was fully reaccredited in 1957. By 1964, Morningside's reputation had recovered to the degree that it was featured in an Oregonian article about its success as an "open hospital." Under the open hospital model, patients were controlled through sedatives rather than lock and key.

The Alaska Mental Health Enabling Act was passed in 1956 and Alaskan patients began being moved from Morningside to new facilities in their home state. The Coes attempted to reorient the hospital. In 1960 they announced that the "transfer of 210 patients from Morningside will enable the Portland psychiatric hospital to begin taking patients locally." The Oregonian reported "Hospital officials feel that Morningside's present facilities and rehabilitation programs geared to both mentally ill and mentally retarded can be adapted to private patients with a few changes." Morningside was never able to recover from the loss of Alaskan patients, however, and attempts by Henry Coe to find a buyer who would continue to use the facilities for medical purposes were unsuccessful.

In the summer of 1968, the last three patients were discharged and Morningside officially closed. The property was sold to Lenrich Associations, a private contractor, and the hospital grounds were used for the construction of Mall 205.

== See also ==
- List of hospitals in Oregon
- Oregon Hospital for the Insane
- Dammasch State Hospital
- Fairview Training Center
