= Alaska Mental Health Enabling Act =

Public Law Act aimed to improve Mental health care

- Long title: An Act to confer upon Alaska autonomy in the field of mental health, transfer from the Federal Government to the Territory the fiscal and functional responsibility for the hospitalization of committed mental patients, and for other purposes.
- Enacted by: the 84th United States Congress

Citations
- Public law: Pub. L. 84–830

Legislative history
- Introduced in the House as H.R. 6376 by Edith Green (D–OR) on 1956

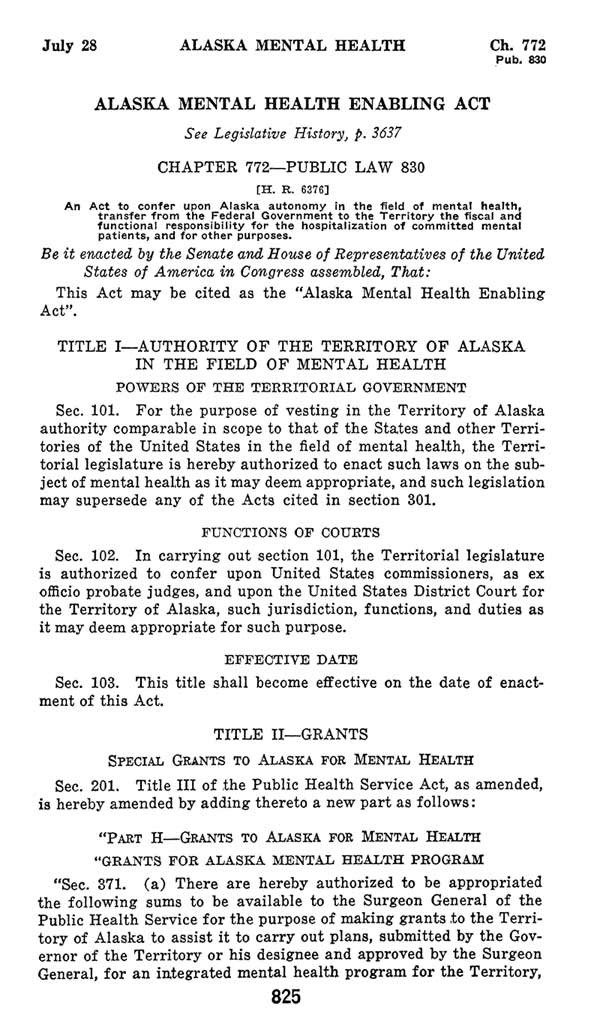
First page of Alaska Mental Health Enabling Act.

The Alaska Mental Health Enabling Act of 1956 (Public Law 84-830) was an Act of Congress passed to improve mental health care in the United States territory of Alaska. Initially bipartisan and uncontroversial, it became the focus of a major political dispute after radical anti-communist activists nicknamed it the "Siberia Bill" and denounced it as being part of a communist plot to hospitalize and brainwash Americans. Campaigners asserted that it was part of an international Jewish, Roman Catholic or psychiatric conspiracy intended to establish United Nations-run concentration camps in the United States.

The legislation in its original form was sponsored by the Democratic Party, but after it ran into opposition, it was rescued by the conservative Republican Senator Barry Goldwater. Under Goldwater's sponsorship, a version of the legislation without the commitment provisions that were the target of intense opposition from a variety of far-right, anti-Communist and fringe religious groups was passed by the United States Senate. The controversy still plays a prominent role in the Church of Scientology's account of its campaign against psychiatry.

The Act succeeded in its initial aim of establishing a mental health care system for Alaska, funded by income from lands allocated to a mental health trust. However, during the 1970s and early 1980s, Alaskan politicians systematically stripped the trust of its lands, transferring the most valuable land to private individuals and state agencies. The asset stripping was eventually ruled to be illegal following several years of litigation, and a reconstituted mental health trust was established in the mid-1980s.

== Background to the act ==
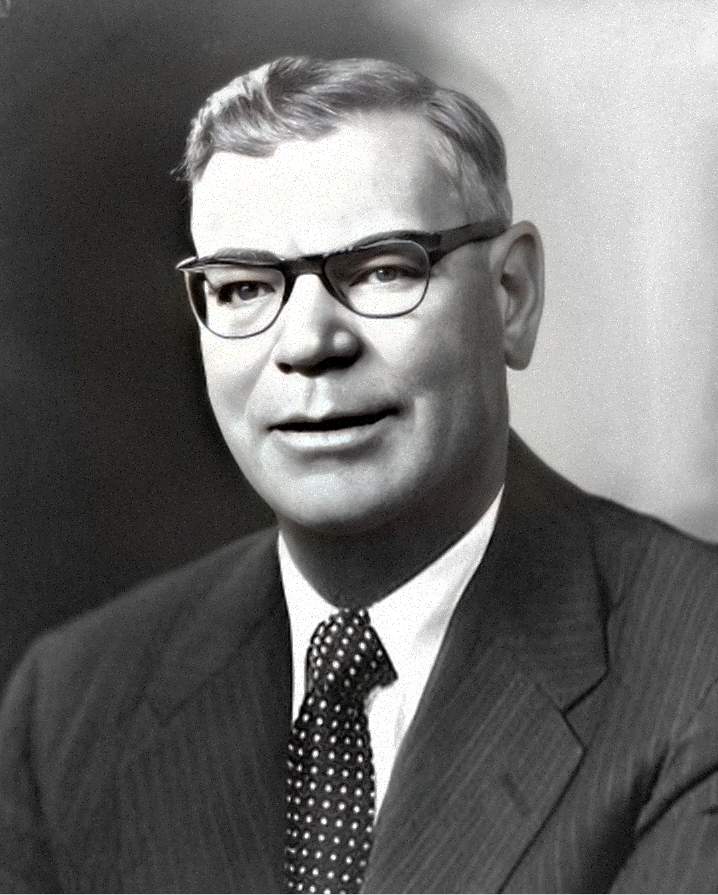
Alaska Delegate (and later Senator) Bob Bartlett, the author of the original Alaska Mental Health Bill

Alaska possessed no mental health treatment facilities prior to the passage of the 1956 Act. At the time of the Act's passage, Alaska was not a U.S. state, being constituted instead as a territory of the United States. The treatment of the mentally ill was governed by an agreement with the state of Oregon dating back to the turn of the 20th century. On June 6, 1900, the United States Congress enacted a law permitting the government of the then District of Alaska to provide mental health care for Alaskans. In 1904, a contract was signed with Morningside Hospital, privately owned and operated by Henry Waldo Coe in Portland, Oregon, under which Alaskan mental patients would be sent to the hospital for treatment. A commitment regime was established under which a person said to be mentally ill was to be brought before a jury of six people for a ruling on insanity. The patient was routinely sent to prison until his release or transfer to Portland; at no point in this ruling was a medical or psychiatric examination required.

By the 1940s, it was recognized that this arrangement was unsatisfactory. The American Medical Association conducted a series of studies in 1948, followed by a Department of the Interior study in 1950. They highlighted the deficiencies of the program: commitment procedures in Alaska were archaic, and the long trip to Portland had a negative effect on patients and their families. In addition, an audit of the hospital contract found that the Sanatorium Company, which owned the hospital, had been padding its expenses. This had enabled it to make an excess profit of $69,000 per year (equivalent to over $588,000 per year at 2007 prices).

The studies recommended a comprehensive overhaul of the system, with the development of an in-territory mental health program for Alaska. This proposal was widely supported by the public and politicians. At the start of 1956, in the second session of the 84th Congress, Representative Edith Green (D-Oregon) introduced the Alaska Mental Health Bill (H.R. 6376) in the House of Representatives. The bill had been written by Bob Bartlett, the Congressional Delegate from the Alaska Territory who later became a U.S. Senator. Senator Richard L. Neuberger (D-Oregon) sponsored an equivalent bill, S. 2518, in the Senate.

== Details of the bill ==
The Alaska Mental Health Bill's stated purpose was to "transfer from the Federal Government to the Territory of Alaska basic responsibility for the hospitalization, care and treatment of the mentally ill of Alaska." In connection with this goal, it aimed:

- to modernize procedures for such hospitalization (including commitment), care, and treatment and to authorize the Territory to modify or supersede such procedures;
- to assist in providing for the Territory necessary facilities for a comprehensive mental-health program in Alaska, including inpatient and outpatient facilities;
- to provide for a land grant to the Territory to assist in placing the program on a firm long-term basis; and
- to provide for a ten-year program, of grants-in-aid to the Territory to enable the Territory gradually to assume the full operating costs of the program.

The bill provided for a cash grant of $12.5 million (about $94 million at 2007 prices) to be disbursed to the Alaskan government in a number of phases, to fund the construction of mental health facilities in the territory. To meet the ongoing costs of the program, the bill transferred one million acres (4,000 km^{2}) of federally owned land in Alaska to the ownership of the proposed new Alaska Mental Health Trust as a grant-in-aid—the federal government owned about 99% of the land of Alaska at the time. The trust would then be able to use the assets of the transferred land (principally mineral and forestry rights) to obtain an ongoing revenue stream to fund the Alaskan mental health program. Similar provisions had applied in other US territories to support the provision of public facilities prior to the achievement of statehood.

In addition, the bill granted the Governor of Alaska authority to enter into reciprocal mental health treatment agreements with the governors of other states. Alaskans who became mentally ill in the lower 48 states would be properly treated locally until they could be returned to Alaska; likewise, citizens of the lower 48 who fell mentally ill in Alaska would receive care there, before being returned to their home states.

The bill was seen as entirely innocuous when it was introduced on January 16, 1956. It enjoyed bipartisan support, and on January 18 it was passed unanimously by the House of Representatives. It then fell to the Senate to consider the equivalent bill in the upper chamber, S. 2518, which was expected to have an equally untroubled passage following hearings scheduled to begin on February 20.

== Controversy ==
=== Initial opposition ===
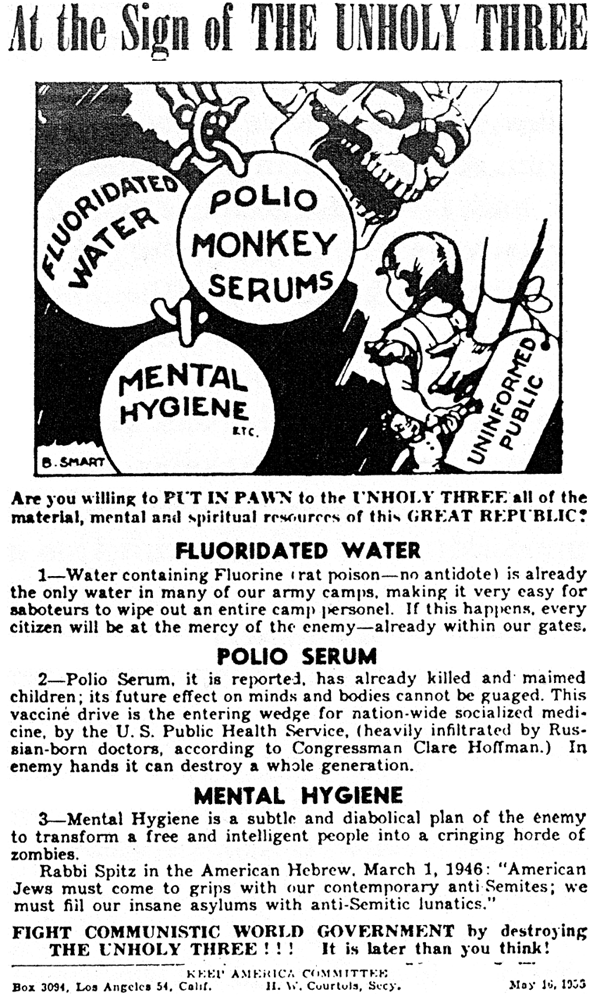
Anti-mental hygiene flier issued in May 1955 by the Keep America Committee

In December 1955, a small anti-communist women's group in Southern California, the American Public Relations Forum (APRF), issued an urgent call to arms in its monthly bulletin. It highlighted the proposed text of the Alaska Mental Health Bill, calling it "one that tops all of them". The bulletin writers commented: "We could not help remembering that Siberia is very near Alaska and since it is obvious no one needs such a large land grant, we were wondering if it could be an American Siberia." They said that the bill "takes away all of the rights of the American citizen to ask for a jury trial and protect him[self] from being railroaded to an asylum by a greedy relative or 'friend' or, as the Alaska bill states, 'an interested party'."

The APRF had a history of opposing mental health legislation; earlier in 1955, it had played a key role in stalling the passage of three mental health bills in the California Assembly. It was part of a wider network of far-right organizations which opposed psychiatry and psychology as being pro-communist, anti-American, anti-Christian and pro-Jewish. The Keep America Committee, another Californian "superpatriot" group, summed up the anti-mental-health mood on the far right in a pamphlet issued in May 1955. Calling "mental hygiene" part of the "unholy three" of the "Communistic World Government", it declared: "Mental Hygiene is a subtle and diabolical plan of the enemy to transform a free and intelligent people into a cringing horde of zombies".

The APRF's membership overlapped with that of the much larger Minute Women of the U.S.A., a nationwide organization of militant anti-communist housewives which claimed up to 50,000 members across the United States. In mid-January 1956, Minute Woman Leigh F. Burkeland of Van Nuys, California issued a bulletin protesting against the bill. It was mimeographed by the California State Chapter of the Minute Women and mailed across the nation. On January 24, 1956, the strongly anti-statist Santa Ana Register newspaper reprinted Burkeland's statement under the headline, "Now — Siberia, U.S.A." Burkeland issued a lurid warning of what the future might hold if the Alaska Mental Health Bill was passed by the Senate:

Is it the purpose of H.R. 6376 to establish a concentration camp for political prisoners under the guise of treatment of mental cases? The answer, based on a study of the bill, indicates that it is entirely within the realm of possibility that we may be establishing in Alaska our own version of the Siberia slave camps run by the Russian government. ... This legislation, say its opponents, will place every resident of the United States at the mercy of the whims and fancies of any person with whom they might have a disagreement, causing a charge of 'mental illness' to be placed against them, with immediate deportation to SIBERIA, U.S.A!

=== Further opposition ===
After the Santa Ana Register published its article, a nationwide network of activists began a vociferous campaign to torpedo the Alaska Mental Health Bill. The campaigners included, among other groups and individuals, the white supremacist Rev. Gerald L. K. Smith; Women for God and Country; the For America League; the Minute Women of the U.S.A.; the right-wing agitator Dan Smoot; the anti-Catholic former US Army Brigadier General Herbert C. Holdridge; and L. Ron Hubbard's Church of Scientology, which had been founded only two years earlier.

Increasingly strong statements were made by the bill's opponents through the course of the spring and summer of 1956. In his February 17 bulletin, Dan Smoot told his subscribers: "I do not doubt that the Alaska Mental Health Act was written by sincere, well-intentioned men. Nonetheless, it fits into a sinister pattern which has been forming ever since the United Nations was organized." Dr. George A. Snyder of Hollywood sent a letter to all members of Congress in which he demanded an investigation of the Alaska Mental Health Bill's proponents for "elements of treason against the American people behind the front of the mental health program". The Keep America Committee of Los Angeles similarly called the proponents of the bill a "conspiratorial gang" that ought to be "investigated, impeached, or at least removed from office" for treason. Retired brigadier general Herbert C. Holdridge sent a public letter to President Dwight Eisenhower on March 12, in which he called the bill "a dastardly attempt to establish a concentration camp in the Alaskan wastes". He went on:

This bill establishes a weapon of violence against our citizenry far more wicked than anything ever known in recorded history — far worse than the Siberian prison camps of the Czars or the Communists, or the violence of the Spanish Inquisition ... The plot of wickedness revealed in this bill fairly reeks of the evil odor of the black forces of the Jesuits who dominate the Vatican, and, through officiates in our Government, dominate our politics.

For their part, America's professional health associations (notably the American Medical Association and American Psychiatric Association) came out in favor of the bill. There was some initial opposition from the Association of American Physicians and Surgeons, a small and extremely conservative body which opposed socialized medicine; Dr. L. S. Sprague of Tucson, Arizona said in its March 1956 newsletter that the bill widened the definition of mental health to cover "everything from falling hair to ingrown toenails". However, the association modified its position after it became clear that the AMA took the opposite view.

By March 1956, it was being said in Washington, D.C. that the amount of correspondence on the bill exceeded anything seen since the previous high-water mark of public controversy, the Lend-Lease Act of 1941. Numerous letter-writers protested to their Congressional representatives that the bill was "anti-religious" or that the land to be transferred to the Alaska Mental Health Trust would be fenced off and used as a concentration camp for the political enemies of various state governors. The well-known broadcaster Fulton Lewis described how he had "received, literally, hundreds of letters protesting bitterly against the bill. I have had telephone calls to the same effect from California, Texas and other parts of the country. Members of Congress report identical reactions." A letter printed in the Daily Oklahoman newspaper in May 1956 summed up many of the arguments made by opponents of the bill:

The advocates of world government, who regard patriotism as the symptom of a diseased mind, took a step closer to their goal of compulsory asylum 'cure' for opponents of UNESCO, when, on January 18, the U.S. House of Representatives passed the Alaska Mental Health Act.

The Act was prepared by the U.S. Department of Justice, Department of the Interior and the socialist-oriented Department of Health, Education and Welfare. It closely follows the Model Code, drafted by the American Psychiatric association, which has been working with the World Health Organization, a specialized agency of the United Nations ...

All of you who don't want members of your family railroaded to an asylum had better start writing your senator, now.

During February and March 1956, hearings were held before the Senate Subcommittee on Territories and Insular Affairs. Proponents and opponents of the bill faced off in a series of tense exchanges, with strong accusations being made against the people and groups involved in the bill's introduction. Stephanie Williams of the American Public Relations Forum said that the bill would enable Russia to reclaim its former Alaskan territory: "[It] contains nothing to prevent Russia from buying the entire million acres — they already say Alaska belongs to them."

Mrs. Ernest W. Howard of the Women's Patriotic Committee on National Defense castigated the slackness of Congress for not picking up on the bill's perceived dangers: "Those of us who have been in the study and research work of the United Nations, we feel that we are experts in this ... you as Senators with all the many commitments and the many requirements, are not able to go into all these things." John Kaspar, a White Citizens' Council organizer who had achieved notoriety for starting a race riot in Clinton, Tennessee, declared that "almost one hundred percent of all psychiatric therapy is Jewish and about eighty percent of psychiatrists are Jewish ... one particular race is administering this particular thing." He argued that Jews were nationalists of another country who were attempting to "usurp American nationality".

=== Passing the bill ===
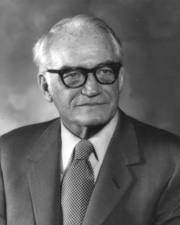
Senator Barry Goldwater, the sponsor of the final version of the Alaska Mental Health Bill

The arguments of the bill's opponents attracted little support in the Senate. The Eisenhower administration, the Alaska territorial government and mainstream religious groups were all in favor of the bill. The Alaska Presbyterian Church gave the bill its unanimous support, issuing a statement declaring: "As Christian citizens of Alaska we believe this is a progressive measure for the care and treatment of the mentally ill of Alaska. We deplore the present antiquated methods of handling our mentally ill." It also urged the National Council of Churches to mobilize support for the bill. An overwhelming majority of senators of both parties were also supportive. The bill's original author, Alaska Delegate Bob Bartlett, spoke for many of the bill's proponents when he expressed his bafflement at the response that it had received:

I am completely at a loss in attempting to fathom the reasons why certain individuals and certain groups have now started a letter-writing campaign ... to defeat the act. I am sure that if the letter writers would consult the facts, they would join with all others not only in hoping this act would become law but in working for its speedy passage and approval.

Other senators expressed similar mystification at the agitation against the bill. Senator Henry M. Jackson of Washington stated that he was "at a loss" to see how the bill affected religion, as its opponents said. Senator Alan Bible of Nevada, the acting chairman of the Subcommittee on Territories and Insular Affairs, told the bill's opponents that nothing in the proposed legislation would permit the removal of any non-Alaskan to the territory for confinement.

Republican Senator Barry Goldwater of Arizona proposed an amended bill that removed the commitment procedures in Title I of the House bill and stated that "Nothing in this title shall be construed to authorize the transfer to Alaska, pursuant to any agreement or otherwise, of any mentally ill person who is not a resident of Alaska." In effect, this eliminated the bill's most controversial element—the provision for the transfer of mental patients from the lower 48 states to Alaska. The final recommendation of the Senate Committee on Interior and Insular Affairs followed Goldwater's lead that the bill be amended to strike all the controversial "detailed provisions for commitment, hospitalization, and care of the mentally ill of Alaska" included in Title I of the original House bill. This amended proposal left only the transfer of responsibility for mental health care to the territory of Alaska and the establishment of land grants to support this care. The committee stressed that they were not invalidating the Title I provisions of the original bill but that they had been misunderstood, a recurrent theme in supporters of the bill:

However, the proposed provisions were misunderstood by many persons in parts of the country other than Alaska. Partly as a result of this misunderstanding, but more because the members of the committee are convinced that the people of Alaska are fully capable of drafting their own laws for a mental health program for Alaska, the committee concluded that authority should be vested in them in this field comparable to that of the States and other Territories.

Thus amended, the Senate bill (S. 2973) was passed unanimously by the Senate on July 20, after only ten minutes of debate.

== Aftermath ==
Following the passage of the act, an Alaska Mental Health Trust was set up to administer the land and grants appropriated to fund the Alaskan mental health program. During the 1970s, the issue of the trust's land became increasingly controversial, with the state coming under increasing pressure to develop the land for private and recreational use. In 1978, the Alaska Legislature passed a law to abolish the trust and transfer the most valuable parcels of lands to private individuals and the government. By 1982, 40,000 acres (160 km^{2}) had been conveyed to municipalities, 50,000 acres (200 km^{2}) transferred to individuals, and slightly over 350,000 acres (1,400 km^{2}) designated as forests, parks or wildlife areas. Around 35 percent of the land trust remained unencumbered and in state ownership.

In 1982, Alaska resident Vern Weiss filed a lawsuit on behalf of his son, who required mental health services that were not available in Alaska. The case of Weiss v State of Alaska eventually became a class action lawsuit involving a range of mental health care groups. The Alaska Supreme Court ruled in 1985 that the abolition of the trust had been illegal and ordered it to be reconstituted. However, as much of the original land had been transferred away, the parties had to undergo a long and complex series of negotiations to resolve the situation. A final settlement was reached in 1994 in which the trust was reconstituted with 500,000 acres (2,000 km^{2}) of original trust land, 500,000 acres (2,000 km^{2}) of replacement land, and $200 million to replace lost income and assets.

== Scientology and the Alaska Mental Health Bill ==
The Alaska Mental Health Bill plays a major part in the Church of Scientology's account of its campaign against psychiatry. The Church participated in the campaign against the bill and still refers to it as the "Siberia Bill". Scientology may also have provided an important piece of the "evidence" which the anti-bill campaigners used — a booklet titled Brain-Washing: A Synthesis of the Russian Textbook on Psychopolitics.

=== Miscavige on Nightline ===
Similarly, David Miscavige, the church's leader, in 1992 told Ted Koppel in an interview on the Nightline program:

I don't know if you're aware that there was a plan in 1955 in this country, Ted, to repeat what was done in Russia. There was going to be a Siberia, USA, set up on a million acres in Alaska to send mental patients. They were going to lessen the commitment laws, you could basically get into an argument with somebody and be sent up there. This sounds very odd. Nobody's ever heard about it. That's in no small part thanks to the Church of Scientology. I must say, though, that when that bill was killed in Congress, the war was on with psychiatry where they declared war on us ... It was a major, major, major flap for the psychiatrists when it got voted down, because then the slogan around the country began, 'Siberia, USA,' and it was really the first time that psychiatry had been denigrated publicly, that they weren't the science that they had been promoting themselves to be. And they took it upon themselves then to start dealing with anybody who would oppose them.

=== Conspiracy theories ===
In Ron's Journal 67, Hubbard identified "the people behind the Siberia Bill", who he asserted were

less than twelve men. They are members of the Bank of England and other higher financial circles. They own and control newspaper chains, and they are, oddly enough, directors in all the mental health groups in the world which have sprung up. Now these chaps are very interesting fellows: They have fantastically corrupt backgrounds; illegitimate children; government graft; a very unsavory lot. And they apparently, sometime in the rather distant past, had determined on a course of action. Being in control of most of the gold supplies of the planet, they entered upon a program of bringing every government to bankruptcy and under their thumb, so that no government would be able to act politically without their permission.

According to David Miscavige, the bill was the product of a conspiracy by the American Psychiatric Association. In a public address in 1995, he told Scientologists that it was "in 1955 that the agents for the American Psychiatric Association met on Capitol Hill to ram home the infamous Siberia Bill, calling for a secret concentration camp in the wastes of Alaska." It was "here that Mr. Hubbard, as the leader of a new and dynamic religious movement, knocked that Siberia Bill right out of the ring — inflicting a blow they would never forget." The assertion that Scientologists defeated the bill is made frequently in Scientology literature. In fact, the original version of the bill with the offending Title I commitment provisions only passed the House of Representatives; it was subsequently amended in conference to strike the commitment portion and retain the transfer of responsibility for mental health care. The revised bill passed easily without further changes.

=== Contemporary publications ===
Contemporary Church publications suggest that although Hubbard was tracking progress of the bill at least as early as February 1956, Scientology did not become involved in the controversy until the start of March 1956, over two months after the American Public Relations Forum had first publicized the bill. A March "Professional Auditor's Bulletin" issued by Hubbard, who was staying in Dublin at the time, includes a telegram from his Washington-based son L. Ron Hubbard, Jr. and two other Scientologists alerting him to the upcoming February Senate hearings:

HOUSE BILL 6376 PASSED JANUARY 18TH STOP GOES SENATE NEXT WEEK STOP BILL PERMITS ADMISSION OF PERSON TO MENTAL INSTITUTION BY WRITTEN APPLICATION OF INTERESTED PERSON BEFORE JUDICIAL PROCEEDINGS ARE HELD STOP DISPENSES WITH REQUIREMENT THAT PATIENT BE PRESENT AT HEARING STOP ANYONE CAN BE EXCLUDED FROM HEARING STOP BILL PERTAINS TO ALASKA AT MOMENT STOP BILL SETS UP ONE MILLION ACRES SIBERIAL [sic] IN ALASKA FOR INSTITUTIONS STOP LETTER AND BILL FOLLOW STOP WHAT ACTION YOU WANT TAKEN.

Although the church says that Scientologists led the opposition to the bill, the Congressional Record's account of the Senate hearings into the bill does not mention the church. A contemporary review of the opposition to the bill likewise attributes the lead role elsewhere and to right-wing groups, rather than the "civil liberties" organizations cited by the church:

Only a few organized groups got behind the hue and cry. Most influential was the libertarian Association of Physicians and Surgeons, and Dan Smoot's newsletter. Right-wing groups bombarded Congress with protests and demands for hearings.

== See also ==
- Citizens Commission on Human Rights
- Scientology and psychiatry
- Scientology controversies
- Water fluoridation controversy
