= Minute Women of the U.S.A. =

1950s American anti-Communist women's group

The Minute Women of the U.S.A. was one of the largest of a number of anti-Communist women's groups that were active during the 1950s and early 1960s. Such groups, which organized American suburban housewives into anti-Communist study groups, political activism and letter-writing campaigns, were a bedrock of support for McCarthyism.

The primary concerns of the Minute Women and other similar groups were the exposure of Communist subversion, the defense of constitutional limits, opposition to Atheism, Socialism and social welfare provisions such as the New Deal; and rejection of Internationalism, particularly in the form of the United Nations. They campaigned to expose supposedly Communist individuals, focusing particularly on school and university administrators.

== Structure and activities ==
The Minute Women were a national group founded by Suzanne Stevenson of Connecticut in September 1949. They grew rapidly, especially in Texas, California, West Virginia, Maryland, and Connecticut. By 1952 they had over 50,000 members. They were predominantly white middle and upper-class women aged between thirty and sixty, with school-aged or grown children. Chapters were relatively small, numbering only a few dozen to a few hundred people. The Houston chapter, which later became famous, was one of the largest in the nation with around 500 members. Over sixty of the Houstonian Minute Women were doctors' wives, reflecting medical opposition to socialized medicine.

Unlike many other anti-Communist groups, the Minute Women operated in a semi-covert fashion. Stevenson instructed members to never reveal that they were Minute Women and always present themselves as individual concerned citizens. In her view, political activism was more effective when it appeared to be spontaneous.

The organization was structured in a unique fashion, ostensibly to defend against Communist infiltration. It had no constitution or bylaws, no parliamentary procedure to guide the meetings, and no option for motions from the floor; its officers were appointed rather than elected. Its members communicated via a chain-telephoning system in which one member called five others, who in turn made five more calls, enabling hundreds to be contacted within a short space of time. Membership of the Minute Women was restricted to American citizens, though the group's founder had been born in Belgium and was the sister of the Belgian Ambassador, Baron Robert Silvercruys. The Minute Women sought to apply political pressure through letter-writing campaigns, heckling speakers and swamping their opponents with telephone calls. In Houston, Texas, where they were particularly strong, they took over the local school board and claimed to have planted observers in University of Houston classrooms to watch out for controversial material and teachers.

== Impact ==
Their tactics were highly effective; as the Houston Post noted, "Many public officials… who might… defy a lone organization… would be loath to go against the wishes of 500 individuals." The Houston Minute Women harassed and instigated the firing of teachers and school administrators, including the deputy superintendent of the Houston public schools, for alleged Communism. They also forced the university to eliminate history programs from its educational television broadcasts. An annual essay-writing contest sponsored by the United Nations Educational, Scientific, and Cultural Organization (UNESCO) was banned on the grounds that UNESCO was unacceptably "internationalist". At one point, the Minute Women circulated a report that "troops flying the United Nations flag once took over several American cities in a surprise move, throwing the mayors in jail and locking up the police chiefs." A member who pointed out the falsity of the report found herself ruled out of order by her fellow Minute Women.

Even well-respected groups and individuals found themselves targeted by the Minute Women. The Quakers' American Friends Service Committee was refused permission to use a Houston meeting hall after the Minute Women protested that Alger Hiss had once attended a Quaker meeting. Rufus Clement, the president of Atlanta University and the first-ever African-American to serve on the Atlanta Board of Education, faced protests from Minute Women when he lectured at a Houston Methodist church, on the grounds that he was "too controversial". The Houston Post commented that "a new meaning has been given to the word controversial… It now often becomes a derogatory epithet, frequently synonymous with the word Communist." There was an overt element of racism in the Minute Women's activities, which included distributing anti-semitic literature and opposing proponents of integrated schools, which they regarded as Communist-inspired advocates of "race mongrelization."

== Exposure and decline ==
The Minute Women's campaign in Houston was eventually blunted by an exposé by the Houston Post in 1953, which published an eleven-part series of articles by reporter Ralph O'Leary which highlighted the group's activities. The newspaper was deluged by an avalanche of mail which was largely complimentary of the newspaper's courage in taking on the Minute Women. O'Leary's reports were widely praised, with Time magazine describing the Post's coverage as "a model of how a newspaper can effectively expose irresponsible vigilantism."

Despite this setback the Minute Women remained active throughout the remainder of the 1950s and into the 1960s. They played a major role in stoking the 1956 controversy over the Alaska Mental Health Bill (HR 6376), claiming that the bill was an attempt by Congress to give the government authority to abduct citizens at will and imprison them in concentration camps in Alaska. The group finally faded away as the nation turned against McCarthyism and the anti-Communist hysteria diminished.

== See also ==
- American Public Relations Forum
- Women in conservatism in the United States
- Minutemen
