= American Public Relations Forum =

Political organization in Southern California

The American Public Relations Forum (APRF) was a conservative anti-communist organization for Catholic women, established in southern California in 1952 with its headquarters in Burbank. It was founded by Stephanie Williams, a San Fernando Valley housewife, who told the opening meeting of the group that "we are wives and mothers who are vitally interested in what is happening in our country." It campaigned against anything it saw as socialist or anti-nationalist, organizing meetings and letter-writing campaigns to apply political pressure as well as issuing monthly newsletters and "emergency bulletins" on issues of urgent concern.

The APRF was not large, numbering only about a hundred people by 1955. However, its influence was magnified by its connections with other conservative women's activist groups that had been established across the United States in the early 1950s to research and report on what they saw as communist activities in the community. It was particularly closely linked with the Minute Women of the U.S.A., which claimed 50,000 members nationwide and overlapped with the APRF's membership. Indeed, the Minute Women considered their southern California chapter to be among their strongest. Such groups were strong supporters of the anti-communist drive spearheaded by FBI head J. Edgar Hoover, Senator Joseph McCarthy, and the House Un-American Activities Committee.

== History ==
One of its earliest campaigns was mounted in 1952 against the United Nations Educational, Scientific, and Cultural Organization (UNESCO) which the APRF regarded as a foreign promoter of internationalist ideas and principles of one-worldism goals that were in line with communist ideology. Joining with other groups of housewife activists such as the Los Angeles Women's Breakfast Club, the Keep America Committee, the Women's Republican Study Club and others, it applied intense pressure to the Los Angeles Unified School District to force the school board to ban a UNESCO-sponsored essay-writing competition from area schools. In early 1953, the school board capitulated and withdrew UNESCO materials from all of the city's classrooms.

During 1955 and 1956 the APRF played a significant role in a concerted campaign mounted by the far right against mental health legislation in California and at the federal level. Three mental health laws proposed in the California Assembly in 1955 (Assembly Bills 1158, 1159 and 3300) attracted the attention of the APRF, which regarded them as an attack on fundamental civil liberties. It issued a bulletin in May 1955 claiming that:

This [bulletin] could very well be our last . . . Before another one is due freedom of speech may be a thing of the past. Whether it is the last one or not, it will certainly be the most important. See that you read every word of it and do not let the sun go down without taking action on the information.

The APRF's head Stephanie Williams testified against the bills before an Assembly committee and, in conjunction with other far-right groups, convinced the committee to pass Bill 3300 back to the Rules Committee, where it languished for another two years. The American Journal of Psychiatry later acknowledged that the APRF had played a lead role in defeating the bill.

At the end of 1955 the APRF launched a campaign against the Alaska Mental Health Bill (HR 6376), a proposed Act of Congress put forward to remedy the long-standing deficiencies in mental health care in the then Alaska Territory. The legislation provided for the transfer of a million acres (4,000 km^{2}) of Federal land in Alaska to the local authorities to fund the cost of providing a modern mental health service in the territory. The APRF claimed that the law was intended to give the government authority to abduct citizens at will and imprison them in concentration camps in Alaska. It published a bulletin setting out its concerns:

We could not help remembering that Siberia is very near Alaska and since it is obvious no one needs such a large land grant, we were wondering if it could be an American Siberia.

The APRF's campaign rapidly gathered a wide and unlikely selection of allies nationwide, including anti-communist groups, anti-socialized medicine groups, religious conservatives and even the recently established Church of Scientology. In support of its claims, the APRF republished Brain-Washing: A Synthesis of the Russian Textbook on Psychopolitics, a pamphlet claimed to have been originated by Stalin's secret police chief Lavrenty Beria but now widely regarded as a forgery written by L. Ron Hubbard. The campaign resulted in a major public controversy but attracted relatively little support in Congress, which passed the bill after only two hours of debate.

The fall of Joseph McCarthy and the gradual abatement of anti-communist hysteria caused the APRF's influence to diminish along with that of other far-right groups, although it remained active into the 1960s.

== See also ==
- Women in conservatism in the United States
