= Daniel Thew Wright Sr. =

American judge (1825–1912)

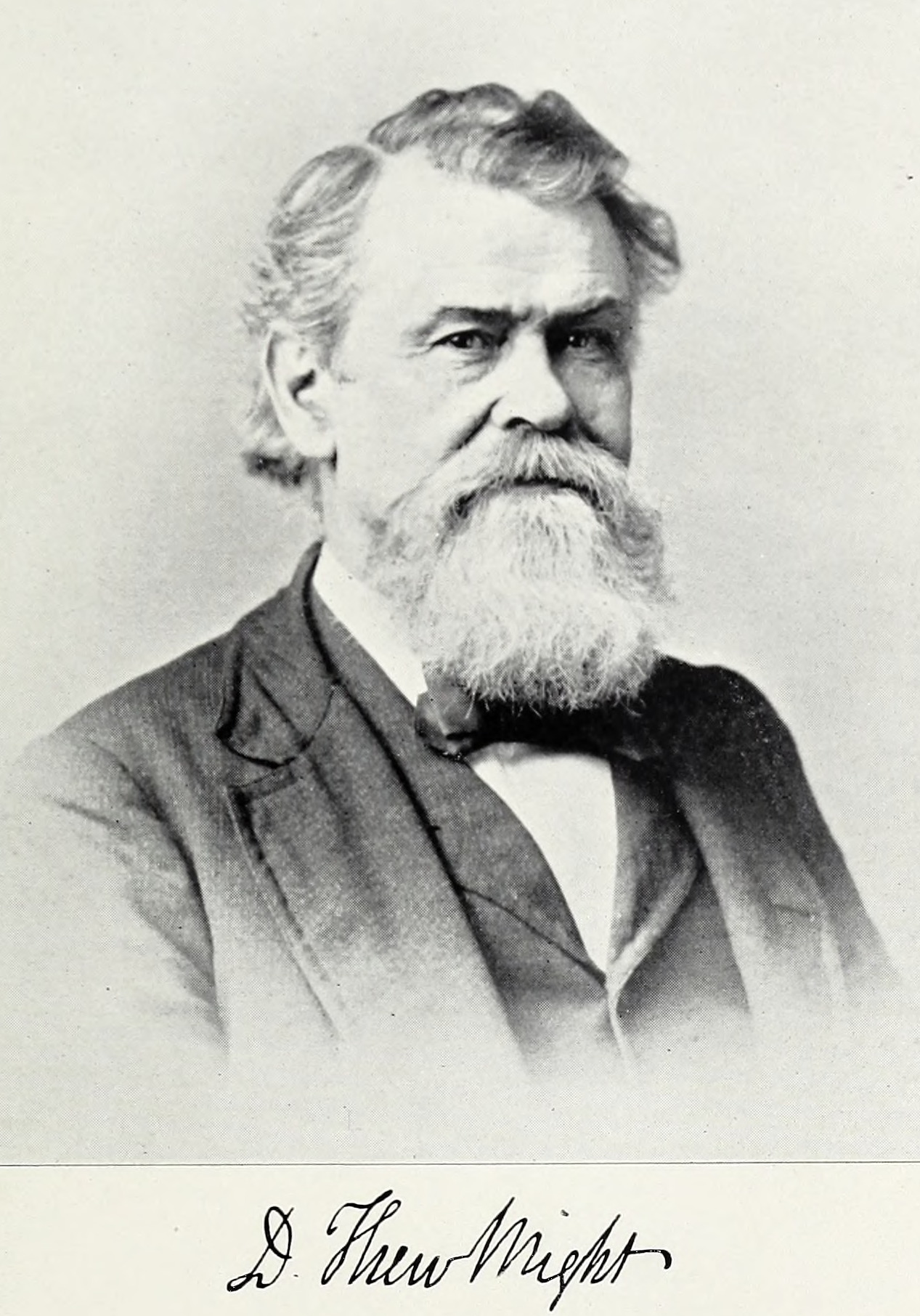
Daniel Thew Wright Sr., in 1894.

Daniel Thew Wright Sr. (25 March 1825 – 11 September 1912) was a member of the Ohio Supreme Court Commission of 1876, appointed from Hamilton County, Ohio to address an overage of Ohio Supreme Court cases. Ohio Governor Rutherford B. Hayes appointed Thew to the Commission on February 2, 1876, along with five other members. Thew served until the Commission was disbanded, in 1879.

Wright died in Cincinnati on September 11, 1912, and is buried at Spring Grove Cemetery.

His son, Daniel Thew Wright, was also a judge, serving on the United States District Court for the District of Columbia.
