= Edward C. Eicher =

American judge and politician (1878–1944)

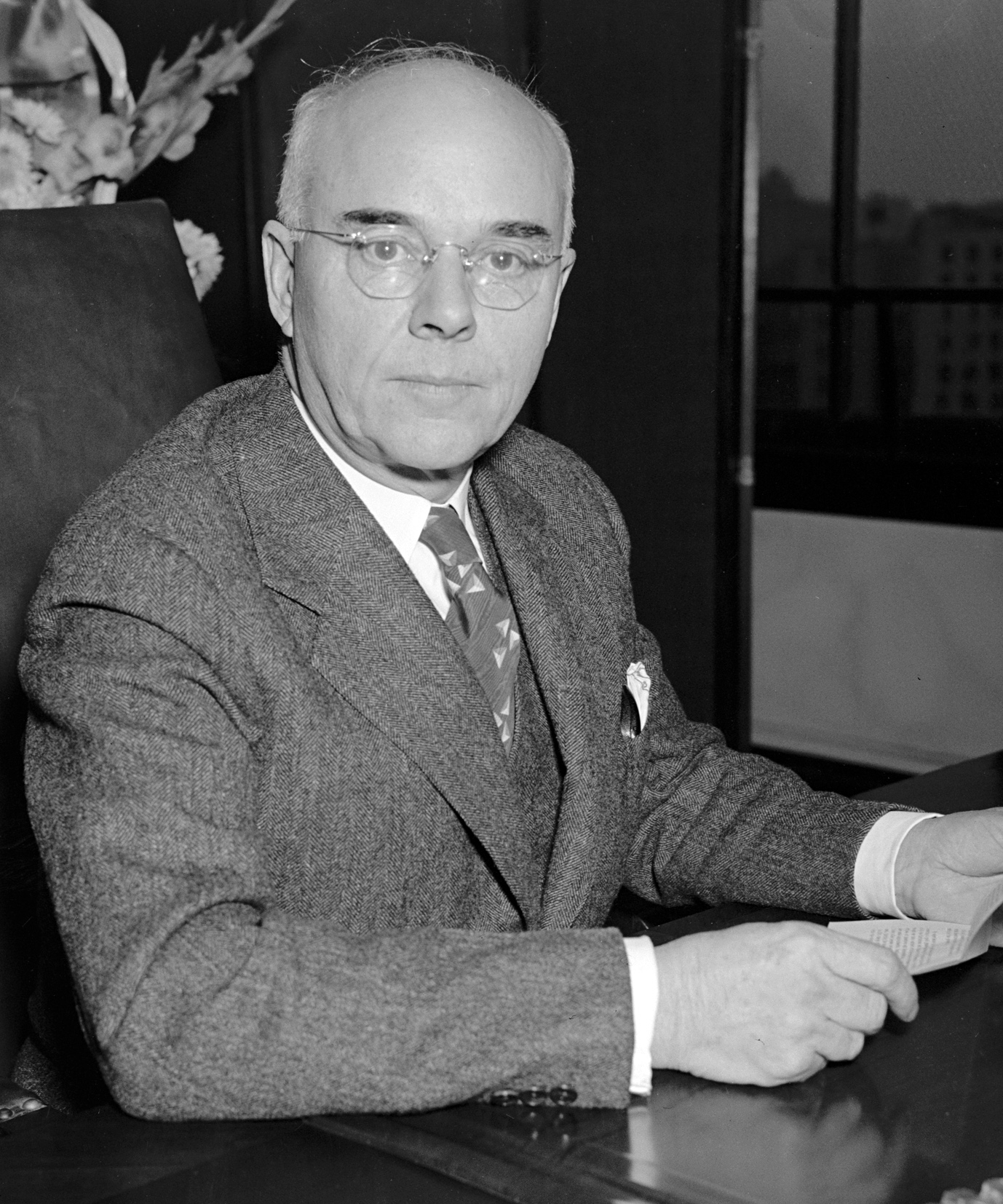
- Eicher in 1938

Chief Justice of the District Court of the United States for the District of Columbia
- In office January 23, 1942 – November 30, 1944
- Appointed by: Franklin D. Roosevelt
- Preceded by: Alfred Adams Wheat
- Succeeded by: Bolitha James Laws

Member of the Securities and Exchange Commission
- In office 1938–1942

Member of the U.S. House of Representatives from Iowa's 1st district
- In office March 4, 1933 – December 2, 1938
- Preceded by: William F. Kopp
- Succeeded by: Thomas E. Martin

Personal details
- Born: Edward Clayton Eicher; December 16, 1878 Noble, Iowa, U.S.
- Died: November 30, 1944 (aged 65) Alexandria, Virginia, U.S.
- Resting place: Woodlawn Cemetery; Washington, Iowa, U.S.
- Party: Democratic
- Education: University of Chicago (BA)

Edward Clayton Eicher (December 16, 1878 – November 30, 1944) was a United States of America lawyer and federal judge. He represented Iowa's 1st congressional district in the United States House of Representatives from 1933 to 1938, was a member of the Securities and Exchange Commission from 1938 to 1942, and served as Chief Justice of the District Court of the United States for the District of Columbia from 1942 until his death in 1944.

Eicher was a staunch liberal in the Democratic Party and a supporter of the New Deal. In Congress, he backed the Roosevelt administration's key initiatives, including legislation on public utilities and the reorganization of the judicial system. In his judicial career, he is best known for presiding over the 1944 mass trial mass sedition prosecution United States v. McWilliams, which ended in a mistrial after his death.

== Biography ==
=== Early life and education ===
Eicher was born on a farm near the unincorporated town of Noble, Iowa. His family's lineage dates back to the 17th century: Eicher Anabaptists were among families of Canton of Bern who fled to Palatinate between 1671 and 1711. His father Benjamin Eicher arrived in America between 1848 and 1849, eventually settling down in Marion Township, Washington County, Iowa, where he purchased 40 acres of land. Twenty years later, he had become a successful farmer owning 150 acres of land, a schoolteacher at several schools, as well as a minister and elder of his church. Time characterized Benjamin as "the kind of liberal who got kicked out of his Amish church for preaching that Amishmen should be allowed to wear buttons on their clothes instead of hooks and eyes."His older brother, Henry Martin Eicher, was a Washington, Iowa attorney.

Edward Eicher attended public schools, Washington Academy in Washington, Iowa, and Morgan Park Academy in Morgan Park, Chicago. He studied law at the University of Chicago Law School. In 1904, he graduated from the University of Chicago with a Bachelor of Philosophy degree. He married Hazel Mount on 19 August, 1908.

=== Legal career ===
Eicher was admitted to the bar in 1906 and briefly practiced in Washington, Iowa. He returned to the University of Chicago, where he served as assistant registrar from 1907 to 1909. In 1909, he moved to Burlington, Iowa, and served as an assistant attorney for the Chicago, Burlington and Quincy Railroad until 1918. In 1918, he returned to Washington where Eicher joined as a partner in his brother's law firm. Henry Eicher died next year, leaving Edward Eicher to manage the company Livingston and Eicher until 1933.

=== U.S. House of Representatives ===
Eicher was a delegate to the Democratic National Convention in 1932. In 1932, Eicher was elected as a Democrat to the United States House of Representatives from Iowa's 1st congressional district. He was re-elected in 1934 and 1936 and served in the 73rd, 74th, and 75th United States Congresses from March 4, 1933, until December 2, 1938.

Eicher was a friend and a strong supporter of Franklin D. Roosevelt. He had worked on the Public Utility Holding Company Act of 1935, backed the Roosevelt administration's Court Plan, and was one of the strongest New Deal supporters among congressional members involved in the federal antimonopoly investigation. In Congress, he introduced several bills: one on funding for scientific research, one to allow the construction of a bridge across the Des Moines River at Keosauqua, and one to allow the federal government to promote interstate transportation by underwriting truck insurance.

Eicher withdrew from the 1938 race for the Democratic nomination for his own seat. When his congressional career ended, Time magazine described him as "a wheelhorse in a pasture of mavericks". In the same election cycle, Eicher supported Representative Otha Wearin in the Democratic primary against incumbent Iowa Senator Guy M. Gillette, who had been targeted by Roosevelt-aligned Democrats. Gillette defeated Wearin in the primary, a result that later affected Eicher's prospects for an appellate judgeship.

=== Securities and Exchange Commission ===
As his final congressional term ended, Roosevelt appointed Eicher to the United States Securities and Exchange Commission. He was a member of the SEC from 1938 to 1942, serving as chair between 1941 and 1942.

=== Federal judicial service ===
New Dealers inside the Roosevelt Administration supported Eicher's wish to be chosen to fill one of two new seats on the United States Court of Appeals for the Eighth Circuit, but Iowa Senator Guy M. Gillette, who resented Eicher and Roosevelt for their unsuccessful efforts to purge him from Congress in 1938, stood in the way. Instead, no Iowan received either judgeship.

Eicher was nominated by President Franklin D. Roosevelt on December 30, 1941, to the Chief Justice seat on the District Court of the United States for the District of Columbia (now the United States District Court for the District of Columbia) vacated by Judge Alfred Adams Wheat. He was confirmed by the United States Senate on January 20, 1942, and received his commission on January 23, 1942. His service terminated on November 30, 1944, due to his death.

== Death ==
Eicher died of a heart attack in Alexandria, Virginia, at age 65. At the time of his death, Eicher had presided for over seven months at the trial of 30 suspected Axis conspirators and sympathizers. Time magazine characterized the trial as "biggest and noisiest sedition trial in United States history", and reported that "no one in Washington doubted that a ludicrously undignified trial had hastened the death of a scrupulously dignified judge." Eicher's death caused a mistrial. After the war ended, the government chose not to prosecute again, and Judge Bolitha James Laws dismissed the charges against the defendants. He was interred in Woodlawn Cemetery in Washington, Iowa.

== Literature ==
- Records and Briefs of the United States Supreme Court. San Francisco: Peenau-Walsh Printing Co. 1944. p. 7-30.
- Gingerich, Melvin (1980). "Edward C. Eicher and the Sedition Trial of 1944". The Palimpsest archive. 61 (1): 18–25.

U.S. House of Representatives
Preceded by William F. Kopp	Member of the U.S. House of Representatives from Iowa's 1st congressional district 1933–1938	Succeeded by Thomas E. Martin
Government offices
Preceded by Jerome Frank	Securities and Exchange Commission Chairman; 1941–1942	Succeeded by Ganson Purcell
Legal offices
Preceded by Alfred Adams Wheat	Chief Justice of the District Court of the United States for the District of Columbia; 1942–1944	Succeeded by Bolitha James Laws
