= Daniel O'Donoghue =

Daniel O'Donoghue may refer to:

- Daniel John O'Donoghue (1844–1907), Irish-born labour leader and political figure in Ontario
- Daniel O'Donoghue (Irish politician) (died 1889), Member of Parliament, 1857–1885
- Daniel William O'Donoghue (1876-1948), U.S. federal judge
- Danny O'Donoghue (born 1980), Irish singer-songwriter
