= George M. Fay =

American lawyer

United States Attorney for the District of Columbia
- In office 1946–1946
- President: Harry S. Truman
- Preceded by: Edward Matthew Curran
- Succeeded by: George E. McNeil
- In office 1946–1951
- Preceded by: George E. McNeil
- Succeeded by: Charles M. Irelan

Personal details
- Born: George Morris Fay; 22 May 1909
- Died: 17 November 1957 (aged 48)
- Party: Democratic
- Spouse: Dorothy M. Donovan
- Children: 5

George M. Fay (1909–1957) was a 20th-century American lawyer who twice served as United States Attorney for the District of Columbia, first in 1946, then 1947–1951.

== Background ==
George Morris Fay was born on May 22, 1909, in Pittston, Pennsylvania. His parents were William Michael Fay and Caroline Runner. In 1931, he received a BA from Georgetown University and in 1935 a Bachelors of Law.

== Career ==
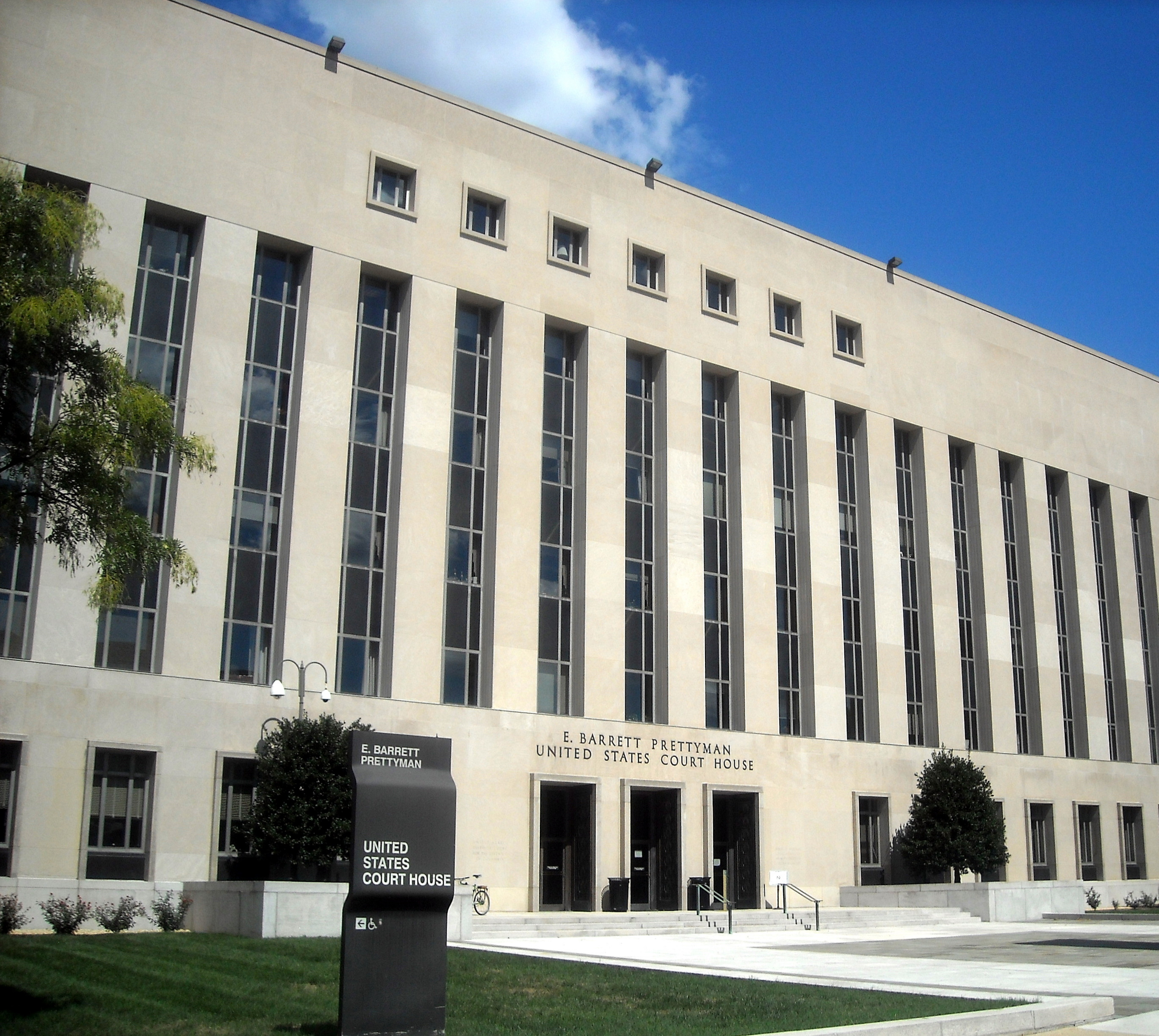
E. Barrett Prettyman Federal Courthouse, where Fay presided during his time as United States Attorney for the United States District Court for the District of Columbia.

=== Early years ===
Fay started his career in the law firm of Fay & Anderson.

In 1935, Fay joined the Bureau of War Risk Litigation at the U.S. Department of Justice. In 1940, he joined its criminal division.

In 1944, he joined the United States Naval Reserves as a lieutenant through 1946.

=== U.S. Attorney General ===
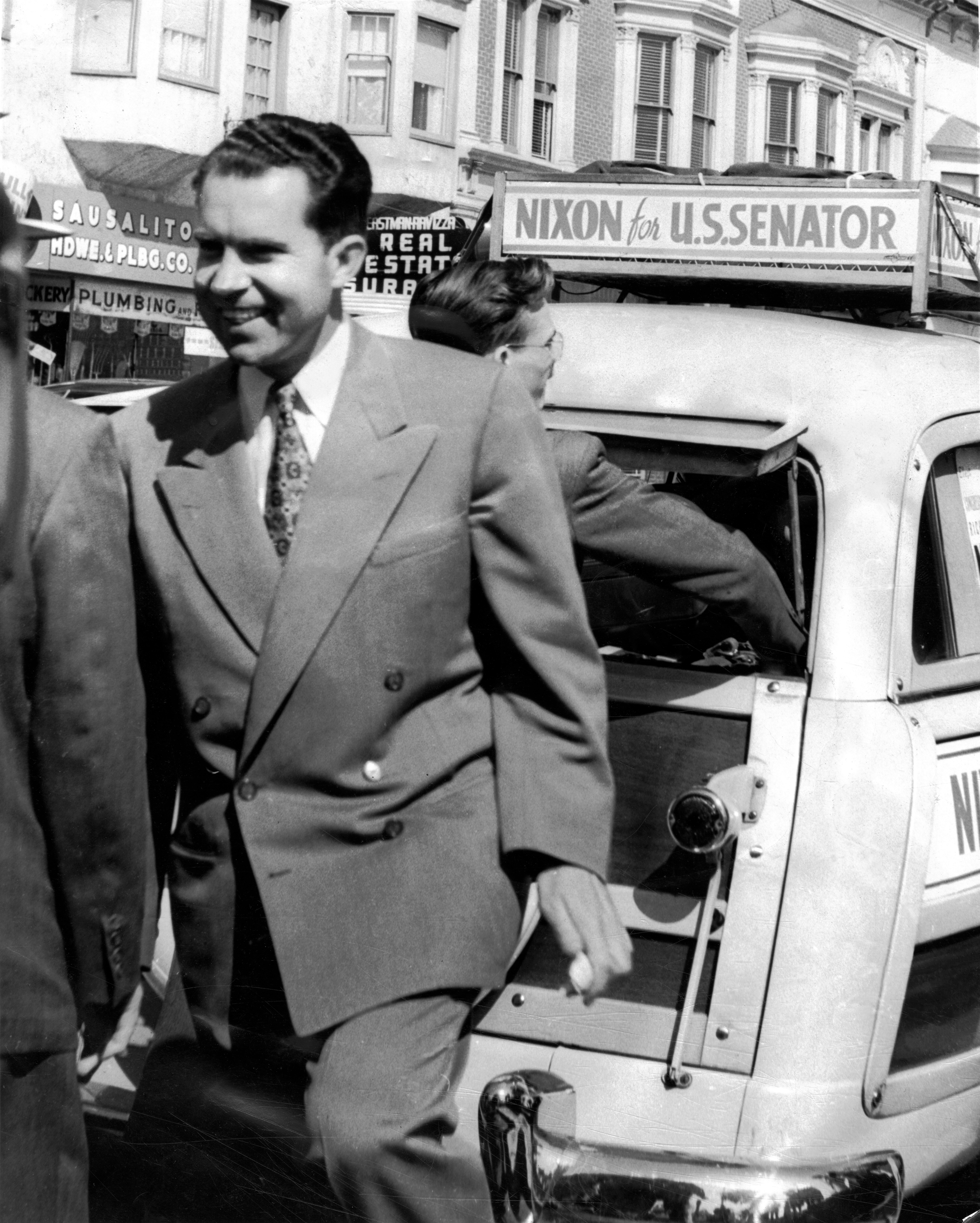
Richard Nixon started his political rise off of the Hiss case, which Fay considered for perjury charges at the end of August 1948

In 1946, he became special assistant to the U.S. Attorney General. Later that year, he received an interim appointment as United States Attorney for the District of Columbia In 1947, he was reappointed and confirmed by the United States Senate and served until 1951.

Starting in 1946, Fay cracked down on sex crimes in the area. "We saw a parade of sex offenses coming in–and nothing could be done. There was no law." Instead, sex crimes–molestation, solicitation, homosexuality–all resulted in disorderly conduct.

On August 26, 1948, shortly after "Confrontation Day" when Alger Hiss and Whittaker Chambers met publicly for the first time during testimony before the House Un-American Activities Committee, Fay expressed interest in pursuing a perjury charge against one of the two men.

In 1949, Fay had eight restaurants in Washington, DC, raided for illegal gambling.

== Personal and death ==
In 1936, Fay married Dorothy M. Donovan. They had five children, Dorothy, Lynn, Joan, William and Gerard.

Fay was a Democrat and member of the American Federal and District of Columbia Bar associations, the Bar of the Supreme Court of the United States, and the Metropolitan Club.

Fay died age 48 on November 17, 1957.

== See also ==
- United States Attorney
- United States District Court for the District of Columbia
- Alger Hiss-Whittaker Chambers Case
