= Edward Curran =

Edward Curran may refer to:

- Edward Matthew Curran (1903-1988), United States district judge
- Terry Curran (Edward Curran, born 1955), English footballer
