= Daniel Thew Wright =

American judge

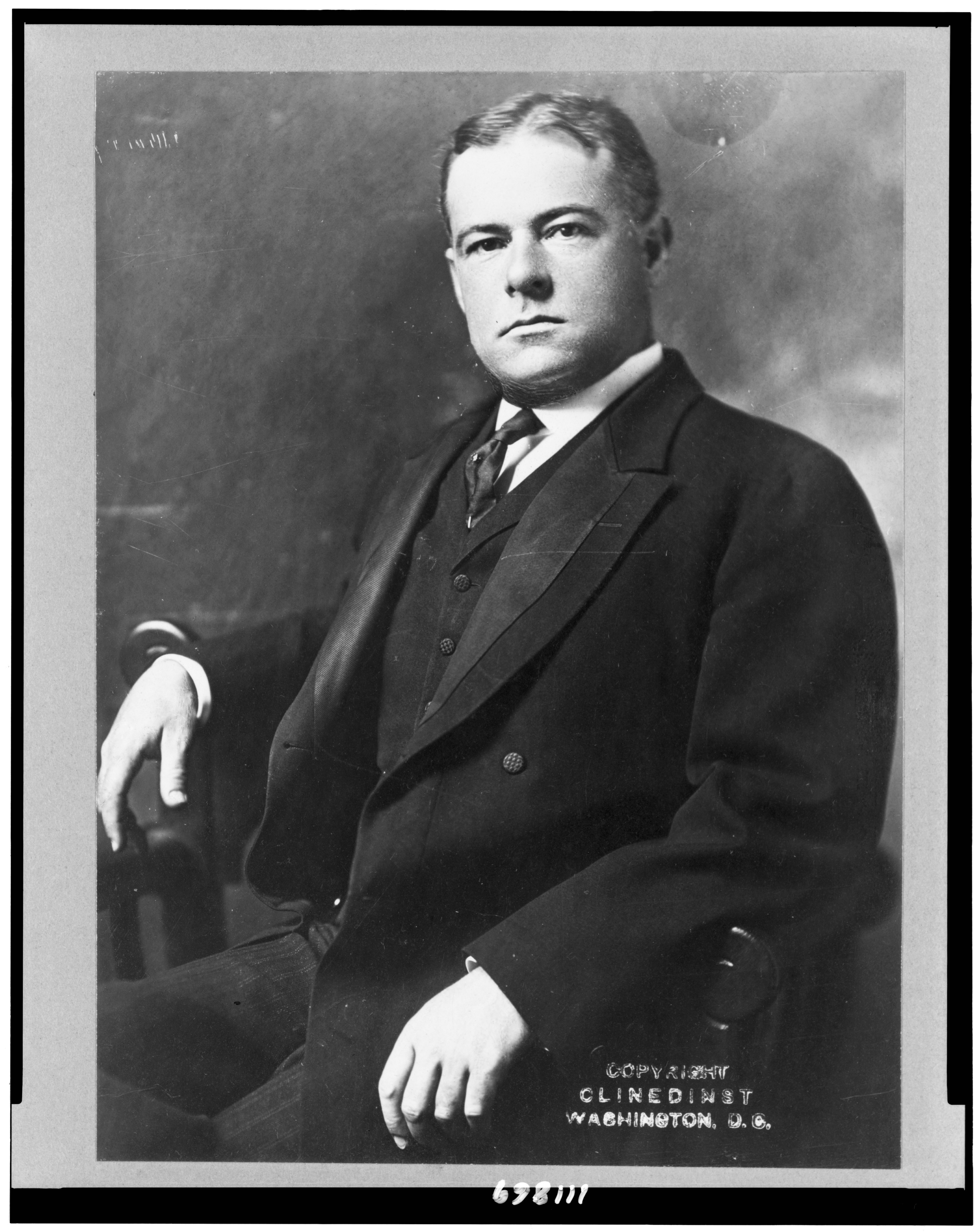

Associate Justice of the Supreme Court of the District of Columbia
- In office November 17, 1903 – November 15, 1914
- Appointed by: Theodore Roosevelt
- Preceded by: Alexander Burton Hagner
- Succeeded by: Frederick Lincoln Siddons

Personal details
- Born: Daniel Thew Wright; September 24, 1864 Riverside, Ohio
- Died: November 18, 1943 (aged 79) Fenwick, Maryland
- Parent: Daniel Thew Wright Sr. (father)
- Education: University of Cincinnati College of Law (LL.B.)

Daniel Thew Wright (September 24, 1864 – November 18, 1943) was an Associate Justice of the Supreme Court of the District of Columbia.

== Education and career ==
Wright was born in Riverside, a neighborhood in Cincinnati, Ohio, son of attorney and Judge Daniel Thew Wright Sr. He received a Bachelor of Laws from University of Cincinnati College of Law in 1887. He was in private practice of law in Cincinnati after 1887. He was a village solicitor of Riverside from 1888 to 1890, and Mayor of Riverside from 1890 to 1893. He was a second assistant prosecuting attorney of Hamilton County, Ohio from 1888 to 1890 and first assistant prosecuting attorney of Hamilton County from 1890 to 1893. Wright was a Judge of the Hamilton County Court of Common Pleas from 1893 to 1898.

== Federal judicial service ==
Wright was nominated by President Theodore Roosevelt on November 10, 1903, to an Associate Justice seat on the Supreme Court of the District of Columbia (now the United States District Court for the District of Columbia) vacated by Associate Justice Alexander Burton Hagner. He was confirmed by the United States Senate on November 17, 1903, and received his commission the same day. His service terminated on November 15, 1914, due to his resignation under threat of impeachment for corruption, on a motion brought by Congressman Frank Park of Georgia.

== Later career and death ==
Wright returned to private practice of law in Washington, D.C. from 1914 to 1937. He served as an adjunct professor at Georgetown Law. Wright died on November 18, 1943, in Fenwick, a community now located in Ocean City, Maryland.

== Sources ==
Legal offices
Preceded by Alexander Burton Hagner	Associate Justice of the Supreme Court of the District of Columbia; 1903–1914	Succeeded by Frederick Lincoln Siddons
