= Richmond Bowling Keech =

American judge

Senior Judge of the United States District Court for the District of Columbia
- In office November 1, 1966 – April 13, 1986

Chief Judge of the United States District Court for the District of Columbia
- In office 1966
- Preceded by: Matthew Francis McGuire
- Succeeded by: Edward Matthew Curran

Judge of the United States District Court for the District of Columbia
- In office October 14, 1946 – November 1, 1966
- Appointed by: Harry S. Truman
- Preceded by: Jesse C. Adkins
- Succeeded by: Joseph Cornelius Waddy

Personal details
- Born: Richmond Bowling Keech; November 28, 1896 Washington, D.C., U.S.
- Died: April 13, 1986 (aged 89)
- Education: Georgetown Law (LL.B., LL.M.)

Richmond Bowling Keech (November 28, 1896 – April 13, 1986) was a United States district judge of the United States District Court for the District of Columbia.

== Education and career ==
Born in Washington, D.C., Keech received a Bachelor of Laws from Georgetown Law in 1922 and a Master of Laws from the same institution in 1923. He served in the United States Navy Transport Service during World War I. He was in private practice in Washington, D.C. from 1922 to 1925. He was an assistant corporation counsel for Washington, D.C. from 1925 to 1930. He was a Professor of Law for National University (now part of George Washington University) in 1930. He was people's counsel of the District of Columbia from 1930 to 1934. He was a law member and Vice Chairman of the Public Utilities Commission in Washington, D.C. from 1934 to 1940. He was corporation counsel for Washington, D.C. from 1940 to 1945. He was an administrative assistant to President Harry S. Truman from 1945 to 1946.

== Federal judicial service ==
Keech received a recess appointment from President Harry S. Truman on October 14, 1946, to an Associate Justice seat on the District Court of the United States for the District of Columbia (Judge of the United States District Court for the District of Columbia from June 25, 1948) vacated by Judge Jesse C. Adkins. He was nominated to the same position by President Truman on January 8, 1947. He was confirmed by the United States Senate on January 22, 1947, and received his commission on January 24, 1947. He served as Chief Judge in 1966. He assumed senior status on November 1, 1966. His service terminated on April 13, 1986, due to his death.

== Sources ==
Legal offices
Preceded by Jesse C. Adkins	Judge of the United States District Court for the District of Columbia; 1947–1966	Succeeded by Joseph Cornelius Waddy
Preceded by Matthew Francis McGuire	Chief Judge of the United States District Court for the District of Columbia; 1966	Succeeded by Edward Matthew Curran
