= Charles Robert Richey =

American judge

Senior Judge of the United States District Court for the District of Columbia
- In office January 23, 1997 – March 19, 1997

Judge of the United States District Court for the District of Columbia
- In office May 5, 1971 – January 23, 1997
- Appointed by: Richard Nixon
- Preceded by: Edward Matthew Curran
- Succeeded by: Richard W. Roberts

Personal details
- Born: Charles Robert Richey; October 16, 1923 Middleburg, Ohio
- Died: March 19, 1997 (aged 73) Washington, D.C.
- Education: Ohio Wesleyan University (A.B.); Case Western Reserve University; School of Law (LL.B.)

Charles Robert Richey (October 16, 1923 – March 19, 1997) was a United States district judge of the United States District Court for the District of Columbia.

== Education and career ==
Richey was born in Middleburg, Ohio, Richey. He received an Artium Baccalaureus degree from Ohio Wesleyan University in 1945 and a Bachelor of Laws from Case Western Reserve University School of Law in 1948. While at Ohio Wesleyan University, he left in early 1944 to serve one year in the United States Army Corps of Engineers at Fort Hayes, Ohio, where he was a procurement specialist and a contract personnel specialist.

He was a legislative counsel to United States Representative Frances P. Bolton from 1948 to 1949. In 1949, he was the executive secretary of the Young Republican National Federation. He was in private practice in Washington, D.C. and Chevy Chase, Maryland from 1949 to 1971, also working as a speech and debate coach for American University from 1954 to 1955. He was special counsel to Montgomery County, Maryland, on Council Redistricting from 1965 to 1966, and was a member of the Montgomery County Board of Appeals from 1965 to 1967, serving as chairman from 1966 to 1967. He was general counsel to the Maryland Public Service Commission from 1967 to 1971.

== Federal judicial service ==
Richey was nominated by President Richard Nixon on April 14, 1971, to the United States District Court for the District of Columbia, to a seat vacated by Judge Edward Matthew Curran. He was confirmed by the United States Senate on April 29, 1971, and received his commission on May 5, 1971. He assumed senior status on January 23, 1997. His service was terminated on March 19, 1997, due to his death in Washington D.C.

Concurrent to his judicial service, Richey was an adjunct professor at the Georgetown University Law Center from 1975 to 1997.

== Controversial role in Watergate litigation ==
Between the Watergate break-in and the run-up to the presidential election of 1972, Richey presided over the civil case brought by the Democratic National Committee seeking monetary damages from the Committee for the Re-Election of the President, given the derisive shorthand of "CREEP". His rulings seemed designed to delay the case until after the election and drove many interested parties, not the least of which was The Washington Post, to a state of near apoplexy. Many suspected and it was later confirmed that Richey was in communication with the Nixon White House. In his book about Watergate and his personal role, John Dean related that "the case looked under control" and that Judge Richey had been "sending encouraging signals through our contacts". In fact, the Judge "had been so accommodating as to urge Stans to file a counter-suit against O’Brien for libel".

During this time, Joseph Califano was representing both the DNC and the Washington Post and, as he related in his own memoirs, was increasingly astonished at Richey's unorthodox behavior behind the bench. When Richey asked all parties to join in a press release announcing that all legal activity would be postponed until after the election, Califano refused, and claimed that "Richey was furious". This episode was witnessed by criminal attorney Harold Ungar, who told Califano, "Joe, in my thirty years of practice, I've never seen anything like this. Never! Pacing in circles, he mumbled over again, 'Never, never, never'".

== Sources ==
Legal offices
Preceded by Edward Matthew Curran	Judge of the United States District Court for the District of Columbia; 1971–1997	Succeeded by Richard W. Roberts
