= Alfred Adams Wheat =

American judge

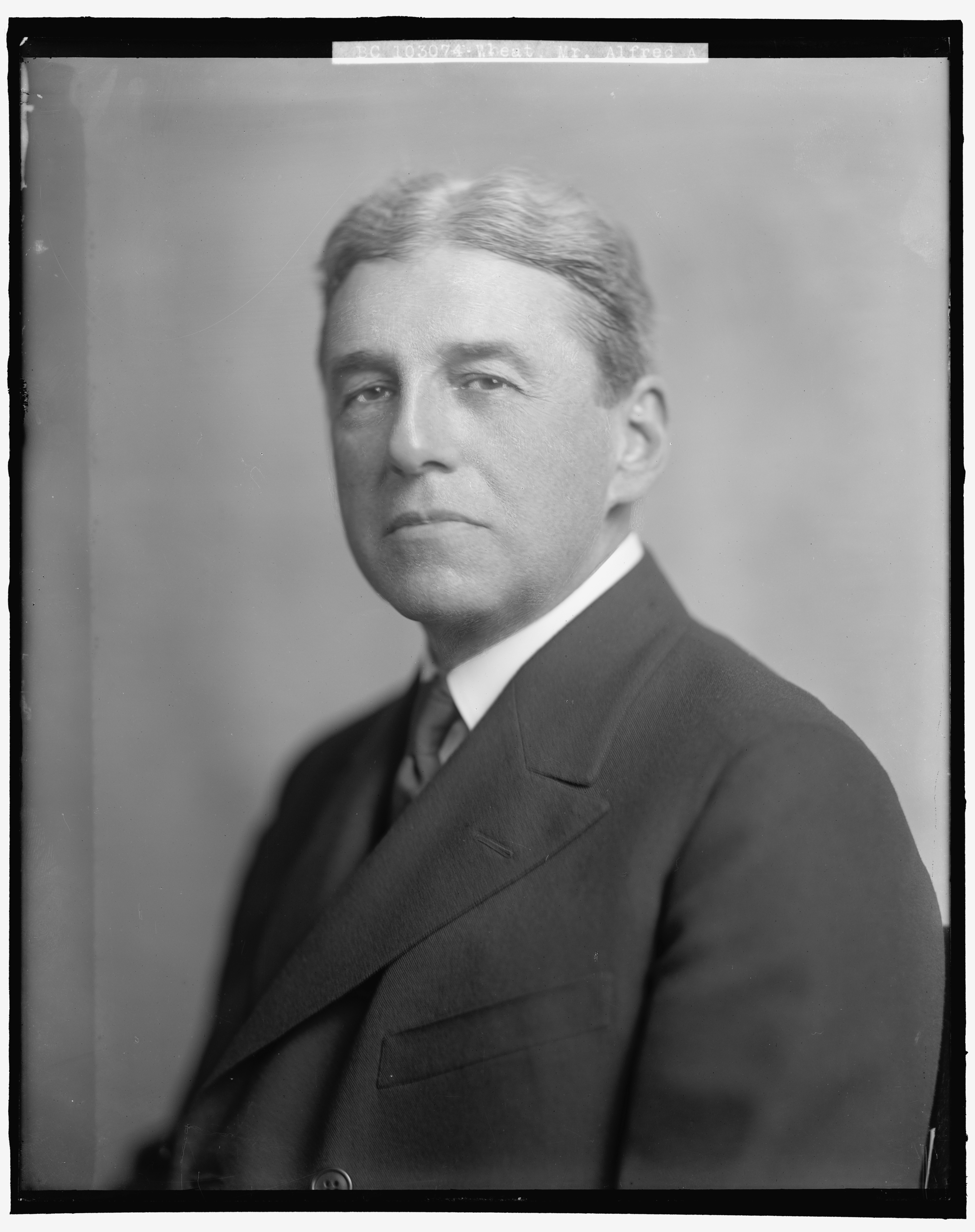
- Harris & Ewing photo

Senior Judge of the District Court of the United States for the District of Columbia
- In office December 31, 1941 – May 11, 1943

Chief Justice of the District Court of the United States for the District of Columbia
- In office June 4, 1930 – December 31, 1941
- Appointed by: Herbert Hoover
- Preceded by: Walter I. McCoy
- Succeeded by: Edward C. Eicher

Associate Justice of the Supreme Court of the District of Columbia
- In office May 3, 1929 – June 4, 1930
- Appointed by: Herbert Hoover
- Preceded by: Seat established by 45 Stat. 1056
- Succeeded by: Jesse C. Adkins

Personal details
- Born: Alfred Adams Wheat; June 13, 1867 Nashua, New Hampshire, U.S.
- Died: March 11, 1943 (aged 75) Washington, D.C., U.S.
- Education: Dartmouth College (A.B.); George Washington University Law School (LL.B.)

Alfred Adams Wheat (June 13, 1867 – March 11, 1943) was an Associate Justice and Chief Justice of the District Court of the United States for the District of Columbia.

== Education and career ==
Born in Nashua, New Hampshire, Wheat received an Artium Baccalaureus degree from Dartmouth College in 1889 and a Bachelor of Laws from the Columbian University School of Law (now the George Washington University Law School) in 1891. He was in private practice in New York City, New York from 1893 to 1922. He was a special assistant to the United States Attorney General in the United States Department of Justice from 1922 to 1929, and was Acting Solicitor General of the United States in 1929.

== Federal judicial service ==
Wheat was nominated by President Herbert Hoover on April 18, 1929, to the Supreme Court of the District of Columbia (now the United States District Court for the District of Columbia, to a new Associate Justice seat authorized by 45 Stat. 1056. He was confirmed by the United States Senate on May 3, 1929, and received his commission the same day. His service terminated on June 4, 1930, due to his elevation to Chief Justice of the same court.

Wheat was nominated by President Hoover on May 14, 1930, to the Chief Justice seat on the Supreme Court of the District of Columbia (District Court of the United States for the District of Columbia from June 25, 1936, now the United States District Court for the District of Columbia) vacated by Chief Justice Walter I. McCoy. He was confirmed by the United States Senate on June 4, 1930, and received his commission the same day. He assumed senior status on December 31, 1941. His service terminated on May 11, 1943, due to his death in Washington, D.C.

== Sources ==
Legal offices
Preceded by Seat established by 45 Stat. 1056	Associate Justice of the Supreme Court of the District of Columbia; 1929–1930	Succeeded by Jesse C. Adkins
Preceded by Walter I. McCoy	Chief Justice of the District Court of the United States for the District of Columbia; 1930–1941	Succeeded by Edward C. Eicher
