= Carl J. Nichols =

American judge (born 1970)

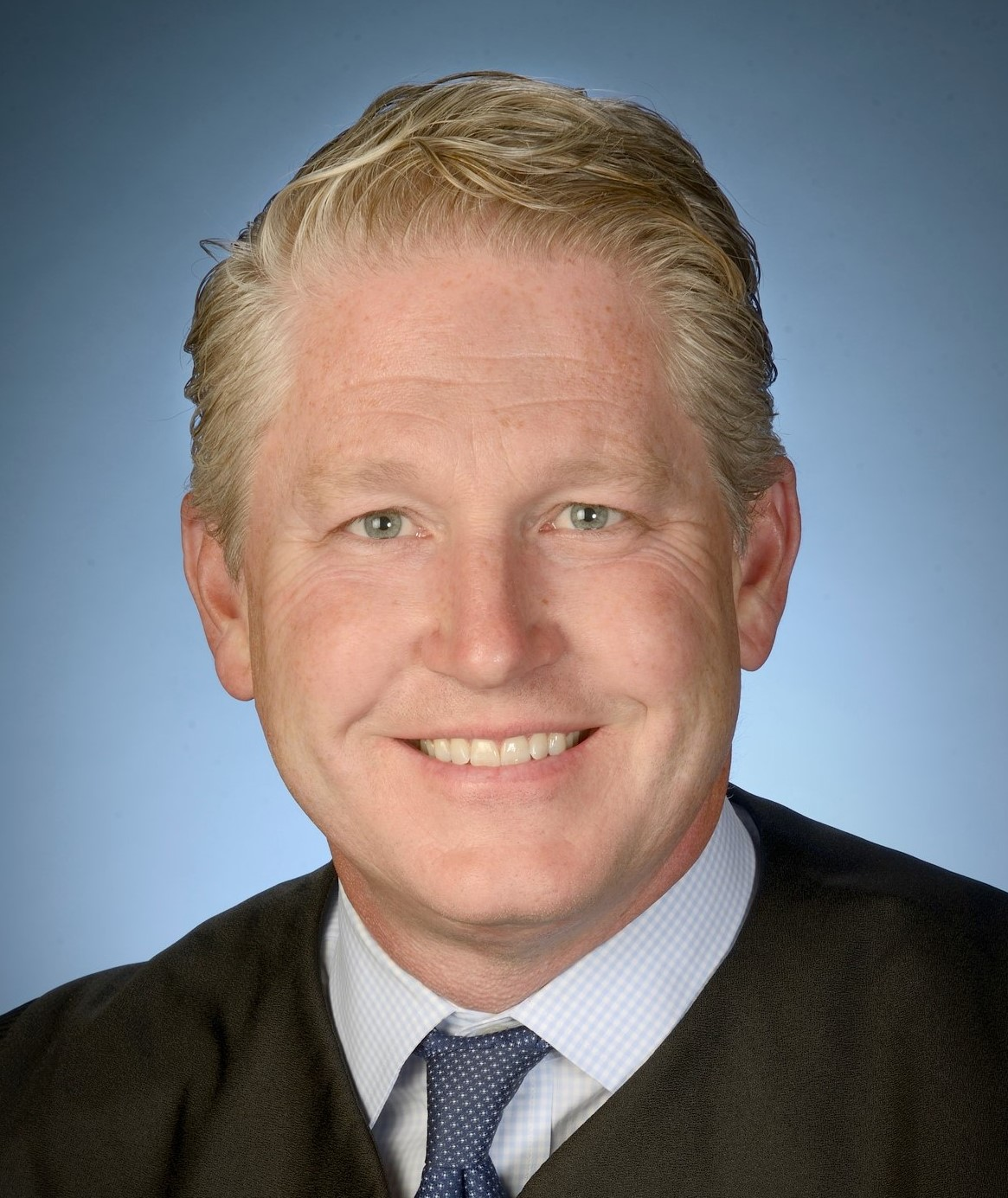

Presiding Judge of the United States Foreign Intelligence Surveillance Court
- Incumbent
- Assumed office May 19, 2026
- Preceded by: Anthony Trenga

Judge of the United States Foreign Intelligence Surveillance Court
- Incumbent
- Assumed office March 11, 2024
- Appointed by: John Roberts
- Preceded by: Liam O'Grady

Judge of the United States District Court for the District of Columbia
- Incumbent
- Assumed office June 25, 2019
- Appointed by: Donald Trump
- Preceded by: Richard W. Roberts

Personal details
- Born: 1970 (age 55–56) Rhinebeck, New York, U.S.
- Education: Dartmouth College (BA); University of Chicago (JD)

Carl John Nichols (born 1970) is an American lawyer and jurist who has served as a United States district judge of the United States District Court for the District of Columbia since 2019. He has concurrently served as a judge of the United States Foreign Intelligence Surveillance Court since 2024 and is the Presiding Judge of that court.

== Early life ==
Nichols was born in 1970 in Rhinebeck, New York. He spent most of his childhood in Simsbury, Connecticut. He left for college and received a Bachelor of Arts in 1992 from Dartmouth College, where he majored in philosophy and graduated with high honors. He spent some time at the University of Edinburgh in Scotland as an exchange student from Dartmouth.

After graduating, he spent one year as a paralegal at a law firm before attending the University of Chicago Law School, where he was a member of the University of Chicago Law Review. He graduated in 1996 with a Juris Doctor, graduating Order of the Coif.

== Career ==
While in law school, Nichols was a summer associate at Gibson, Dunn & Crutcher in 1995. After law school, Nichols was a law clerk to Judge Laurence Silberman of the United States Court of Appeals for the District of Columbia Circuit from 1996 to 1997. He then clerked for Justice Clarence Thomas of the U.S. Supreme Court from 1997 to 1998.

From 1998 to 2005, Nichols was in private practice at the law firm Boies Schiller Flexner LLP, becoming a partner in 2002. He later joined the United States Department of Justice as a deputy assistant attorney general for the Federal Programs Branch of the Civil Division, and then as principal deputy associate attorney general. He left the government in 2009 and joined Wilmer Cutler Pickering Hale and Dorr, where he worked as a partner until 2019.

=== Federal judicial service ===
Nichols was mentioned as a potential judicial nominee in March 2018. On June 7, 2018, President Donald Trump announced his intent to nominate Nichols to serve as a United States district judge of the United States District Court for the District of Columbia. On June 18, 2018, his nomination was sent to the Senate. President Trump nominated Nichols to the seat vacated by Richard W. Roberts, who assumed senior status on March 16, 2016. On August 22, 2018, a hearing on his nomination was held before the Senate Judiciary Committee. On October 11, 2018, his nomination was reported out of committee by an 11–10 vote.

On January 3, 2019, his nomination was returned to the President under Rule XXXI, Paragraph 6 of the United States Senate. On January 23, 2019, President Trump announced his intent to renominate Nichols for the same federal judgeship. His nomination was sent to the Senate later that day. On February 7, 2019, his nomination was reported out of committee by a 12–10 vote. On May 21, 2019, the Senate invoked cloture on his nomination by a 55–42 vote. On May 22, 2019, his nomination was confirmed by a 55–43 vote. He received his judicial commission on June 25, 2019.

== Notable cases ==
=== American Foreign Service Association v. Trump ===
On February 7, 2025, in a case involving the shutdown of the U.S. Agency for International Development (USAID), Nichols issued a temporary restraining order that blocked the government from putting 2,200 USAID employees on administrative leave as was planned to happen by midnight that evening, reinstating 500 USAID employees who had already been placed on administrative leave, and pausing an order that recalled USAID employees posted overseas to the United States. On February 21, Nichols declined to extend the injunction. Nichols ruled that "the record now reflects that no USAID employee stationed abroad has been or imminently will be required to return to the United States within thirty days." Nichols ruled, in effect, that discontinuing housing, visa sponsorship, and security was not tantamount to "requiring" employees stationed abroad to return.

=== Trial of Steve Bannon ===
Nichols was the judge for the 2022 trial in which a jury convicted Steve Bannon of contempt of Congress.

=== United States v. Miller ===
In March 2022, Nichols ruled that Garret Miller, one of the defendants criminally charged in connection with the 2021 U. S. Capitol attack, could not be charged with obstructing Congress's certification of the 2020 presidential election without a showing that Miller had tampered with official documents or records as part of the attack. Nichols's ruling is contrary to those of all seven other U.S. District Court judges who had considered the same issue, and may affect up to 275 similar criminal prosecutions. The U.S. Supreme Court agreed with Nichols in Fischer v. United States, resulting in hundreds of charges being dropped and sentences changed.

=== Dominion defamation lawsuits ===
On August 11, 2021, Nichols denied motions to dismiss lawsuits brought by Dominion Voting Systems alleging that Sidney Powell (1:21-cv-00040 (CJN)), Rudy Giuliani (1:21-cv-00213 (CJN)), and Mike Lindell (1:21-cv-00445 (CJN)) defamed and damaged Dominion by their statements alleging fraud and misconduct in the 2020 presidential election. Those lawsuits, therefore, were allowed to proceed.

=== TikTok v. Trump ===
On Sunday, September 27, 2020, Judge Nichols, granting in part the motion of plaintiffs TikTok and ByteDance, issued a preliminary injunction partially enjoining (i.e., temporarily stopping) the Department of Commerce's implementation of President Donald Trump's August 6, 2020, executive order prohibiting certain transactions related to TikTok. The portion of the prohibition that Nichols enjoined would have barred Apple and Google from offering TikTok in their app stores, and would have taken effect just before midnight that night.

On December 7, 2020, Judge Nichols granted a second preliminary injunction requested by TikTok and ByteBance, enjoining the remainder of the Commerce Department's implementation of that executive order. The case (then captioned TikTok v. Biden) was dismissed by joint stipulation of the parties on July 21, 2021, following President Biden's decision to rescind President Trump's August 6, 2020, executive order.

=== Donald J. Trump v. Committee on Ways and Means ===
On August 1, 2019, Nichols issued a temporary order that barred the State of New York from handing over state tax returns to the U.S. House Committee on Ways and Means and established a briefing and hearing schedule. The state, through its attorney general and co-defendant Letitia James, promptly asked Nichols to dismiss the lawsuit or transfer it to a federal court in New York, on the ground that it cannot be maintained against them where the defendants neither reside nor act. On November 11, 2019, Nichols dismissed the lawsuit, finding that the court did not have jurisdiction over the New York Attorney General or the commissioner of the New York Department of Taxation and Finance.

=== Trial of Sean Dunn ===
Nichols presided over the trial of Sean Dunn, who was acquitted of assaulting a federal agent by throwing a Subway sandwich at him.

== Affiliation ==
Nichols has been a member of the Federalist Society; once from 2003 to 2008 and again in 2018.

== See also ==
- List of law clerks for the tenth seat of the Supreme Court of the United States

Legal offices
Preceded by Richard W. Roberts	Judge of the United States District Court for the District of Columbia; 2019–present	Incumbent
Preceded by Liam O'Grady	Judge of the United States Foreign Intelligence Surveillance Court; 2024–present	Incumbent
Preceded by Anthony Trenga	Presiding Judge of the United States Foreign Intelligence Surveillance Court; 2026–present	Incumbent
