= Frederick Lincoln Siddons =

American judge

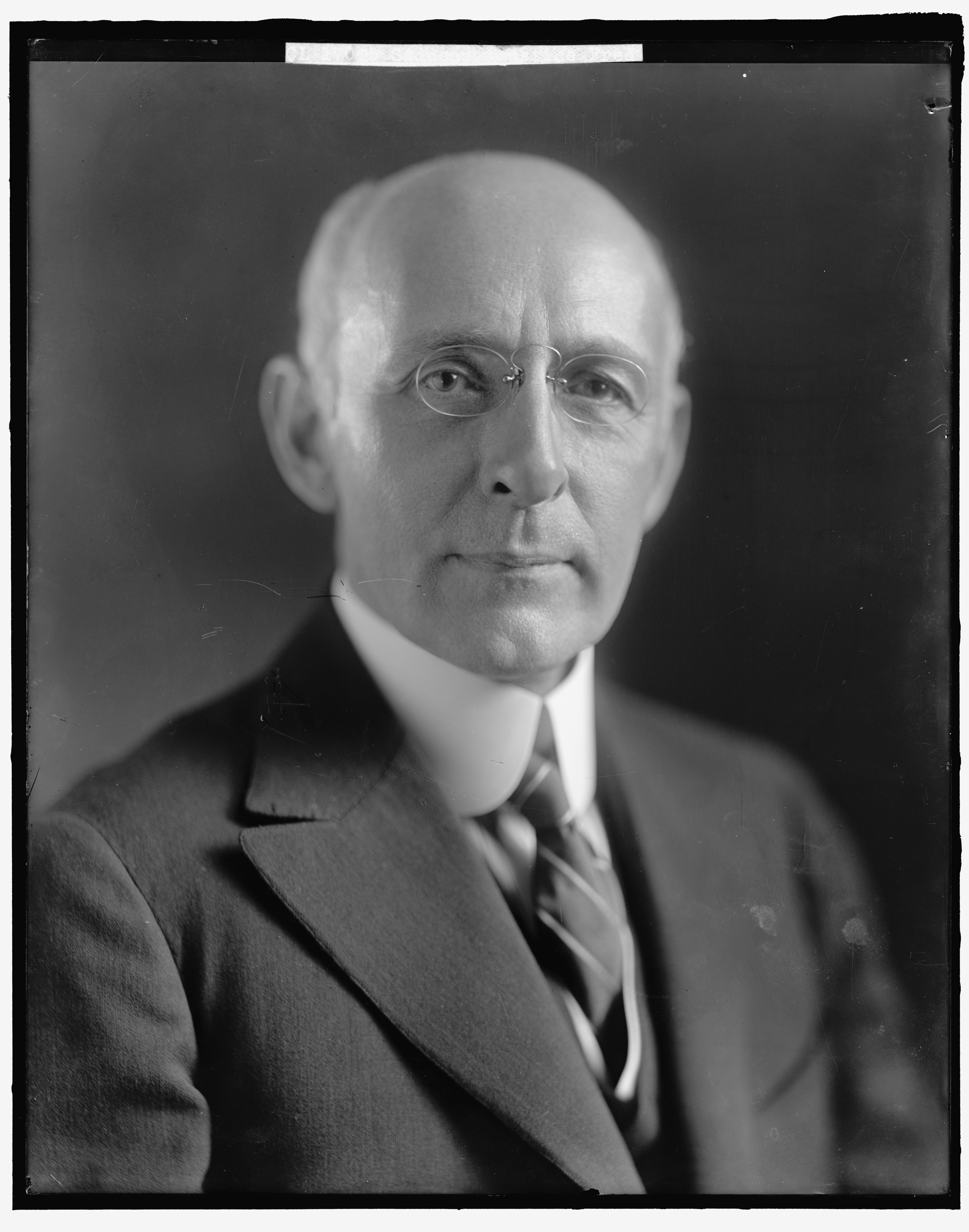

Associate Justice of the Supreme Court of the District of Columbia
- In office January 15, 1915 – June 19, 1931
- Appointed by: Woodrow Wilson
- Preceded by: Daniel Thew Wright
- Succeeded by: Daniel William O'Donoghue

Member of the Board of Commissioners of Washington, D.C.
- In office July 19, 1913 – January 26, 1915
- President: Woodrow Wilson
- Preceded by: John Alexander Johnston
- Succeeded by: Louis Brownlow

Personal details
- Born: Frederick Lincoln Siddons; November 21, 1864 London, England
- Died: June 19, 1931 (aged 66) Washington, D.C.
- Resting place: Glenwood Cemetery
- Education: George Washington University Law School (LL.B., LL.M.)

Frederick Lincoln Siddons (November 21, 1864 – June 19, 1931) was an Associate Justice of the Supreme Court of the District of Columbia.

== Education and career ==
He was born on November 21, 1864, in London, England, and baptized at St Michael's, Highgate. The parents were named as James Henry Siddons (who was actually Joachim Hayward Stocqueler) and Mary Agnes (née Cameron), a performer, who were not married until 1870.

Siddons received a Bachelor of Laws in 1887 and a Master of Laws in 1888, both from Columbian University School of Law (now George Washington University Law School). He was employed with the United States Department of the Treasury starting in 1888. He entered private practice in Washington, D.C. starting in 1890. He was a Professor of Law at National University School of Law (now George Washington University Law School) from 1898. He was a member of the Commission on Uniform State Laws for the District of Columbia.

== Federal judicial service ==
Siddons was a United States Commissioner for the Supreme Court of the District of Columbia from 1913 to 1915.

Siddons was nominated by President Woodrow Wilson on December 9, 1914, to an Associate Justice seat on the Supreme Court of the District of Columbia (now the United States District Court for the District of Columbia) vacated by Associate Justice Daniel Thew Wright. He was confirmed by the United States Senate on January 15, 1915, and received his commission the same day. His service terminated on June 19, 1931, due to his death in Washington, D.C.

=== Notable case ===
In 1927, Justice Siddons was involved in declaring a mistrial at one stage of the Teapot Dome affair, “the largest scandal in the U.S. government since the administration of President Ulysses S. Grant.”

== Sources ==
- Commercial Law Journal (55 Com. L. J. 290 (1950), http://heinonline.org/HOL/LandingPage?handle=hein.journals/clla55&div=103&id=&page=)
- The Lawyer and Banker and Southern Bench and Southern Bar Review, 468 (1914) (http://heinonline.org/HOL/LandingPage?handle=hein.journals/lbancelj7&div=125&id=&page=)
- The Washington Post, Sunday, July 27, 1913

Legal offices
Preceded by Daniel Thew Wright	Associate Justice of the Supreme Court of the District of Columbia; 1915–1931	Succeeded by Daniel William O'Donoghue
