= Beryl Howell =

American federal judge (born 1956)

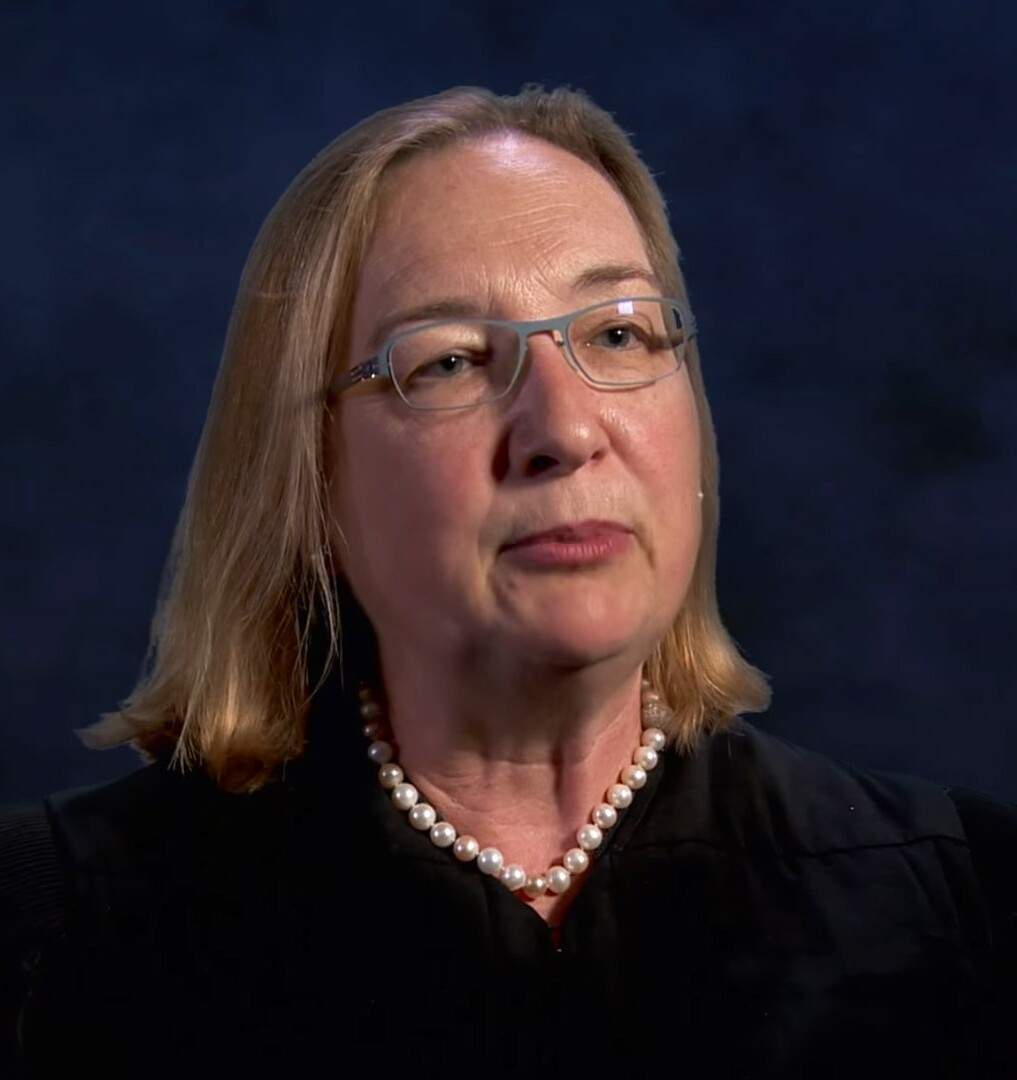
- Howell in 2018

Senior Judge of the United States District Court for the District of Columbia
- Incumbent
- Assumed office February 1, 2024

Chief Judge of the United States District Court for the District of Columbia
- In office March 16, 2016 – March 16, 2023
- Preceded by: Richard W. Roberts
- Succeeded by: James Boasberg

Judge of the United States District Court for the District of Columbia
- In office December 27, 2010 – February 1, 2024
- Appointed by: Barack Obama
- Preceded by: Paul L. Friedman
- Succeeded by: Amir Ali

Personal details
- Born: December 3, 1956 (age 69) Fort Benning, Georgia
- Education: Bryn Mawr College (BA); Columbia University (JD)

Beryl Alaine Howell (born December 3, 1956) is an American attorney and jurist who serves as a senior United States district judge of the U.S. District Court for the District of Columbia. She was appointed to the District of Columbia federal court in 2010 by President Barack Obama, and she served as its chief judge from 2016 to 2023. As chief judge, she supervised federal grand juries in the district, including for the Mueller special counsel investigation into Russian interference in the 2016 United States elections and investigations into attempts to overturn the 2020 United States presidential election.

== Early life and education ==
Howell was born in 1956 in Fort Benning. She is the daughter of an U.S. Army officer. She attended elementary and secondary school in six states and Germany.

Howell graduated from Bryn Mawr College in 1978 with a Bachelor of Arts in philosophy with honors. From 1978 to 1980, Howell worked as a legal assistant at the law firm Shanley & Fisher (now part of Faegre Drinker). She then attended Columbia Law School, graduating in 1983 with a Juris Doctor as a Harlan Fiske Stone Scholar.

== Career ==
After law school, Howell was a law clerk for Judge Dickinson R. Debevoise of the United States District Court for the District of New Jersey from 1983 to 1984. From 1985 to 1987, she was in private practice as an associate at the New York City law firm of Schulte Roth & Zabel.

From 1987 to 1993, Howell was an assistant United States attorney for the United States District Court for the Eastern District of New York, where she became deputy chief of the Narcotics section. From 1993 to 2003, Howell served on the staff of the United States Senate Committee on the Judiciary as a senior advisor to Chairman Patrick Leahy, including as the committee's general counsel starting in 1997.

While working for Senator Leahy, Howell helped craft the E-FOIA amendments, which expanded electronic access to government records. She also helped Sen. Leahy fend off proposals to impose new limits on the FOIA. In 2001, she was honored by the Coalition to Support and Expand the Freedom of Information Act, and in 2004, her FOIA work was honored by the Society of Professional Journalists.

Howell was involved in crafting numerous pieces of legislation for the investigation and prosecution of computer crime and copyright infringement, including the Anti-Cybersquatting Consumer Protection Act, the National Information Infrastructure Protection Act, the Computer Fraud and Abuse Act, the Communications Assistance for Law Enforcement Act (CALEA), the No Electronic Theft Act (NET Act), the Digital Millennium Copyright Act (DMCA), and the Digital Theft Deterrence and Copyright Damages Improvement Act of 1999.

Howell was involved in national security issues, including the creation of the USA PATRIOT Act, which she defended in 2005 in an article for the Pennsylvania Bar Association Quarterly.

The Center for Democracy and Technology lists Howell as a "board alum".

From 2004 to 2010, she served as a member of the United States Sentencing Commission after being appointed by President George W. Bush.

=== Champion Award ===
In November 2023 at a meeting of the Women's White Collar Defense Association, Howell received the Champion Award for people who advance opportunities for women in "the white collar field". In her acceptance speech, she said: "My D.C. judicial colleagues and I regularly see the impact of big lies at the sentencing of hundreds, hundreds of individuals who have been convicted for offense conduct on Jan. 6, 2021, when they disrupted the certification of the 2020 presidential election at the U.S. Capitol." She also cited historian Heather Cox Richardson’s book, Democracy Awakening. The next month, Representative Elise Stefanik, a Republican from New York, filed a complaint of judicial misconduct in which she alleged that Howell's remarks were "conduct unbecoming of a federal judge".

=== Lobbying ===
From 2004 to 2009, Howell was executive vice president, executive managing director, and general counsel at Stroz Friedberg, a global digital risk management and investigations firm. Howell's work at Stroz Friedberg included lobbying on behalf of the Recording Industry Association of America, and, briefly, Universal Music Group.

In 2008, Howell served as a member of the Commission on Cybersecurity for the 44th Presidency, sponsored by bipartisan think tank Center for Strategic and International Studies.

=== Academic ===
Howell teaches legal ethics as an adjunct professor at the American University's Washington College of Law.

=== Federal judicial service ===
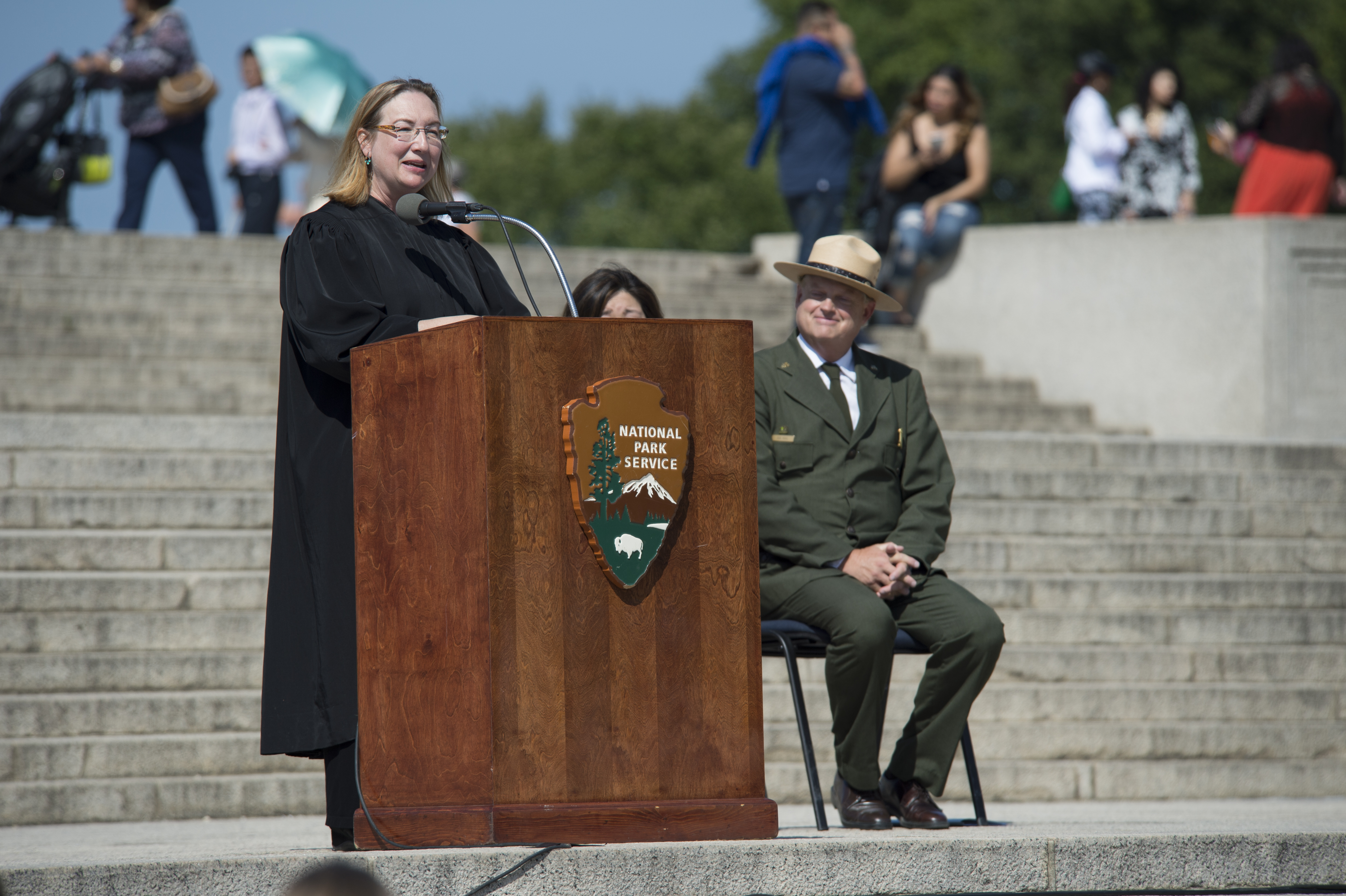
Howell presiding over a naturalization ceremony, 2016

On July 14, 2010, Howell was nominated by President Barack Obama to the United States district judge of the U.S. District Court for the District of Columbia seat being vacated by Judge Paul L. Friedman, who assumed senior status on December 31, 2009. She was confirmed by the U.S. Senate on December 22, 2010. She received her judicial commission on December 27, 2010. She served as the chief judge from March 17, 2016, to March 17, 2023. She assumed senior status on February 1, 2024. A 2015 analysis by Ravel Law found Howell to be the second most-cited district court judge appointed in the previous five years.

=== Notable decisions ===
==== Hodge v Talkin ====
In 2011, Harold Hodge Jr. stood outside the U.S. Supreme Court wearing a sign that protested the American government's treatment of black and Hispanic people. He did so in violation of a 1949 federal law that makes such protests a crime. Hodge sued the Marshal of the United States Supreme Court and the U.S. Attorney for the District of Columbia under the First Amendment. In a June 2013 decision, Howell struck down the law as violating the First Amendment's guarantee of free speech. The judge wrote, "The absolute prohibition on expressive activity in the statute is unreasonable, substantially overbroad and irreconcilable with the First Amendment." The defendants appealed the decision to the U.S. Court of Appeals for the District of Columbia, which reversed Howell's decision and reinstated the law as it applies to the Supreme Court Plaza and steps. Hodge v. Talkin, 799 F. 3d 1145 (D.C. Cir. 2015).

==== FEC and anonymous dark money ====
In 2018, Howell struck down a regulation of the Federal Election Commission allowing dark money groups, certain nonprofit organizations engaged in political activities, to conceal their donors. She wrote that the regulation "blatantly undercuts the congressional goal of fully disclosing the sources of money flowing into federal political campaigns, and thereby suppresses the benefits intended to accrue from disclosure." The Supreme Court later declined to review the decision.

==== Robert Mueller grand jury ====
In that same year, Howell became the supervising judge for the grand jury working for special counsel Robert Mueller's investigation into Russian interference in the 2016 United States elections. On October 25, 2019, she ruled in favor of the House Judiciary Committee, which had sought grand jury materials from the Mueller investigation, finding their impeachment inquiry into President Donald Trump to be a judicial proceeding. Justice Department attorneys had previously asserted that congressional investigators had "not yet exhausted [their] available discovery tools,” arguments Howell said "smack of farce," as the administration had openly stated it would stonewall the investigation.

==== Executive Order 14230 against Perkins Coie ====
On March 6, 2025, citing the firm's association with Fusion GPS and George Soros, President Trump issued Executive Order 14230 titled "Addressing Risks from Perkins Coie LLP." The order suspended security clearances for the firm's employees, restricted their access to federal buildings, directed agencies to review and potentially terminate contracts with the firm, and ordered the government not to hire attorneys from the firm.

In May 2025, Judge Howell issued a permanent injunction blocking the executive order in its entirety; citing "No American president has ever before issued executive orders like the one... this action draws from a playbook as old as Shakespeare who penned the phrase "The first thing we do, let's kill all the lawyers"... The importance of independent lawyers to ensuring the American judicial systems fair and impartial administration of justice has been recognized in this country since its founding era in 1770... The instant case presents an unprecedented attack on these founding principles."

==== Warrentless arrests of suspected undocumented immigrants ====
In December 2025, Howell limited warrantless immigration arrests in Washington D.C., ruling that Federal immigration officers cannot make an arrest without a warrant unless they can show probable cause that the person is a flight risk.

== Personal life ==
Howell is married to Michael Rosenfeld, an executive producer at National Geographic Television & Film. They have three children.

== Publications ==
- Beryl Howell, "Lawyers on the Hook: Counsel’s Professional Responsibility to Provide Quality Assurance in Electronic Discovery", 2 J. Sec. L. Reg. & Compl. 216 (June 2009).
- Beryl Howell, "Real World Problems of Virtual Crime, in Cybercrime: Digital Cops in a Networked Environment" (Jack M. Balkin et al., New York University Press 2007).
- Beryl Howell & Dana J. Lesemann, "FISA’s Fruits in Criminal Cases: An Opportunity for Improved Accountability", 12 UCLA J. Intl. L. & For. Affairs 145 (Spring 2007).
- Beryl A. Howell & Richard J. Wolf, "Rough Waters Ahead for E-discovery and the New Federal Rules of Civil Procedure," ACC Docket (January/February 2007).
- Beryl Howell, "What You Need to Know About Digital Forensics," 28 Pa. Law. 32 (2006).
- Beryl Howell, "Foreign Intelligence Surveillance Act: Has the Solution Become the Problem?", in Protecting What Matters: Technology, Security, and Liberty Since 9/11 (Clayton Northouse, Brookings Institution Press 2006).
- Beryl Howell, "Perspectives on the USA PATRIOT Act" (Pennsylvania Bar Association Quarterly, January 2005).
- Beryl Howell, "Seven Weeks: The Making of the USA Patriot Act", 72 Geo. Wash. L. Rev. 1145 (2004).
- Beryl Howell & Eric Friedberg, 21st Century Forensics: Searching for the "Smoking Gun" in Computer Hard Drives," 37 Prosecutor 18 (2003).

== See also ==
- List of Jewish American jurists

Legal offices
Preceded by Paul L. Friedman	Judge of the United States District Court for the District of Columbia; 2010–2024	Succeeded by Amir Ali
Preceded by Richard W. Roberts	Chief Judge of the United States District Court for the District of Columbia; 2016–2023	Succeeded by James Boasberg
