= Richard W. Roberts =

American judge (born 1953)

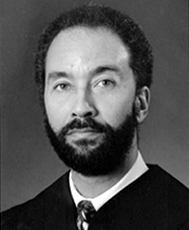

Senior Judge of the United States District Court for the District of Columbia
- Incumbent
- Assumed office March 16, 2016

Chief Judge of the United States District Court for the District of Columbia
- In office July 15, 2013 – March 16, 2016
- Preceded by: Royce C. Lamberth
- Succeeded by: Beryl A. Howell

Judge of the United States District Court for the District of Columbia
- In office June 23, 1998 – March 16, 2016
- Appointed by: Bill Clinton
- Preceded by: Charles Robert Richey
- Succeeded by: Carl J. Nichols

Personal details
- Born: Richard Warren Roberts; June 21, 1953 (age 73) New York City, U.S.
- Education: Vassar College (AB); School for International Training (MIA.); Columbia University (JD)

Richard Warren Roberts (born June 21, 1953) is an inactive senior United States district judge of the United States District Court for the District of Columbia.

== Early life and education ==
Roberts was born in New York City, and is African American. Both of Roberts's parents were public school teachers. His mother was involved as a chorister at the Metropolitan Opera, and his father was avidly involved with the NAACP and participated in the March on Washington for Jobs and Freedom in 1963. His father also participated in the 1968 march in Memphis, Tennessee, following the assassination of Martin Luther King Jr. Roberts attended the High School of Music and Art in New York City and was a 1970 graduate.

Roberts studied mathematics at Vassar College, graduating in 1974 with a Artium Baccalaureus degree cum laude. He continued his education at both the School for International Training in Brattleboro, Vermont, and Columbia Law School in New York City. In 1978, he received a Master of International Administration from the School for International Training, and a Juris Doctor from Columbia Law School.

== Organization membership and other titles ==
In 1983, Roberts helped found the Washington, D.C., chapter of Concerned Black Men, Inc. The vision of this organization is to help provide more black male role models for children in various communities across the United States. Roberts held the positions of secretary and deputy general counsel for the Washington, D.C., chapter. He is a Master of the Edward Bennett Williams Inn of Court; an Archon in Sigma Pi Phi, Epsilon boulé; and a member of The DePriest 15 and of the Judicial Council of the Washington Bar Association. He was earlier a member of the National Black Prosecutors Association and of the National Conference of Black Lawyers, Washington, D.C. Chapter.

According to the Biography by the National Conference on Citizenship, Roberts has held various academic, community, and legal positions. In academic settings, he served for four terms on the board of trustees of Vassar College, has been a visiting faculty member of the Harvard Law School Trial Advocacy Workshop for over 37 years, and was an adjunct professor of trial practice at Georgetown University Law Center. He also served on the faculty of the Department of Justice National Advocacy Center, and has been a writing coach for first year students at Howard Law School.

Roberts has also held positions on the board of directors for the Abramson Scholarship Foundation, as well as the Council for Court Excellence and their executive committee. Roberts was a term member of the Council on Foreign Relations and co-chaired a local public school restructuring team. He has served on the board of directors of the Historical Society of the D.C. Circuit; the steering committee of the African-American Alumnae/i of Vassar College; and the board of directors of the Alumnae and Alumni of Vassar College.

== Pre-judicial career ==
The first position that Roberts held was as a Trial Attorney position for the Civil Rights Division of the United States Department of Justice. He held this position from 1978 to 1982. In this position, Roberts prosecuted the murder of two black Salt Lake City joggers who were killed for racial reasons by Joseph Paul Franklin, a white supremacist.

While prosecuting Franklin, the 27-year-old Roberts met Terry Mitchell, a 16-year-old wounded survivor of Franklin's attack on the joggers and one of two key eyewitnesses at his trial. Mitchell alleged 35 years later that Roberts raped her repeatedly, "nearly every day for several weeks", before and after the trial. She says he obtained her silence by telling her that if their sexual relationship ever came to light it would surely result in a mistrial for Franklin and his subsequent release.

After his tenure as a trial attorney for the Department of Justice, Roberts joined the international law private practice, Covington & Burling. He was an attorney at Covington & Burling for four years until 1986.

In 1986, Roberts was then appointed as an assistant United States attorney for the Southern District of New York He served underneath United States Attorney Rudy Giuliani, who later served as Mayor of New York City. He held the position of assistant United States attorney for two years until he was appointed as an assistant United States attorney for the District of Columbia, underneath United States Attorney Jay B. Stephens. In 1993, when President Bill Clinton appointed Eric Holder as United States attorney for the District of Columbia, Roberts was picked as the principal assistant United States attorney. Roberts held the position of principal assistant U.S. attorney for two years until 1995.

One of the most notable cases that Roberts prosecuted was Washington, D.C., Mayor Marion Barry. https://www.washingtonpost.com/archive/lifestyle/1990/08/01/the-prosecutors-who-didnt-rest/d31ec92f-e00f-4972-b507-2dc5bf8128f0/ Mayor Barry was arrested after a sting at the Vista Hotel involving crack cocaine.

Attorney General Janet Reno appointed Roberts to the position of Criminal Section Chief of the United States Department of Justice, Civil Rights Division, in 1995. He served in this position for three years until 1998.

== Federal judicial service ==
President Bill Clinton nominated Roberts to the United States District Court for the District of Columbia on January 27, 1998, to a seat vacated by Judge Charles R. Richey. He was then confirmed by the United States Senate on June 5, 1998, received his commission on June 23, 1998 and sworn in on July 31, 1998. He served as chief judge and a member of the Judicial Conference of the United States from 2013 until March 16, 2016, when he took inactive senior status. On February 20, 2025, the Duke Ellington School of the Arts in Washington, D.C. hosted the virtual unveiling of his judicial portrait that was painted by renowned portrait artist Simmie Knox. https://drive.google.com/file/d/1WbxVgHhrh_wBe5U1WVG5TaXXOORipl8r/view?usp=drivesdk.

=== Barring CIA destruction of torture tapes ===
Roberts issued a court order prohibiting the CIA destroying evidence of its use of interrogations in July 2005. CIA Director Michael V. Hayden acknowledged in December 2007 that the CIA had subsequently destroyed hundreds of hours of tapes of the use of "extended interrogation techniques", including the technique known as "waterboarding", where subjects's lungs are filled with water, so they experience the first stages of drowning.

Many commentators have described the CIA's destruction of this evidence as a violation of Roberts's court order. On January 24, 2008, Roberts demanded an explanation from the CIA for the tapes destruction.

On March 25, 2008 Charles Carpenter, a lawyer for a Guantanamo captive from Yemen named Hani Abdullah brought suit against the CIA, before Roberts, arguing that the evidence the CIA destroyed would have helped prove his client's innocence.

=== Citizens United ===
Roberts signed on to the unanimous three-judge district court opinion against Citizens United that recognized as constitutional the federal legislation that was designed to purge national politics of the pernicious influence of big money campaign contributions by restricting corporate speech advocating the defeat of a candidate. Citizens United v. Federal Election Commission, 530 F. Supp. 2d 274 (D.D.C. 2008). The Supreme Court later retreated from its own precedents that the district court had followed and issued its controversial split decision favoring Citizens United and reversing the district court. 558 U.S. 310 (2010).

=== Abu Zubaydah ===
Roberts oversaw a lawsuit by Abu Zubaydah challenging his detention at Guantanamo Bay detention camps which was filed in July 2008 after the Boumediene v. Bush ruling. As of 2015, the judge had failed to rule on any motions related to the case, even the preliminary ones. This led Zubaydah's lawyers to file motion asking Roberts to recuse himself for "nonfeasance" in January 2015.

== Inactive senior status and sexual assault allegation ==
On March 16, 2016, Roberts took inactive senior status, citing unspecified health issues. Judge Karen L. Henderson signed Roberts's certificate of disability, allowing him to take early senior status. That same day, Terry Mitchell, the eyewitness from the Franklin trial, filed a federal suit against him, accusing him of repeatedly raping her when she was a witness in a high-profile Utah murder case 35 years earlier. Roberts said that her accusations “are perplexing and demonstrably false” and “flat wrong.” Roberts's lawyers told members of the press that their client, who was 27 and unmarried at the time, did indeed have a brief consensual sexual relationship with Mitchell but that it occurred after the trial ended. Mitchell also filed a judicial misconduct complaint, and the ensuing extensive investigation found that neither the facts nor the law supported her claims, conclusions that Mitchell did not challenge. Her lawsuit was dismissed with prejudice in 2021. That order was affirmed on appeal, a decision Mitchell did not challenge.

== Sibley suit ==
Montgomery Blair Sibley, the last lawyer for the late Deborah Jeane Palfrey, sued Roberts for his refusal to file Sibley's request to have a prior judge's gag order lifted, that forced Sibley to keep Palfrey's customer list private. Palfrey was a prominent arranger of trysts with high class call girls, and Sibley alleged her client list was packed with highly placed Washington insiders. In April 2016, the U.S. Supreme Court denied the request to lift the lower court order, in place since 2007, that bars Sibley from releasing any information about her records.

== Awards and honors ==
For Roberts's prosecutorial efforts against Joseph Paul Franklin, the U.S. Attorney General awarded him with a special commendation. Roberts also graduated cum laude from Vassar College in 1974 with a bachelor's degree. When Roberts was a civil rights prosecutor in the Justice Department, he was hired into the Attorney General's Honors Program. Roberts was inducted into the Hall of Fame of the Council on Legal Education Opportunity. He was bestowed the Outstanding Service to Vassar Award.

== See also ==
- List of African-American federal judges
- List of African-American jurists

Legal offices
Preceded by Charles Robert Richey	Judge of the United States District Court for the District of Columbia; 1998–2016	Succeeded by Carl J. Nichols
Preceded by Royce C. Lamberth	Chief Judge of the United States District Court for the District of Columbia; 2013–2016	Succeeded by Beryl A. Howell
