= Walter I. McCoy =

American judge

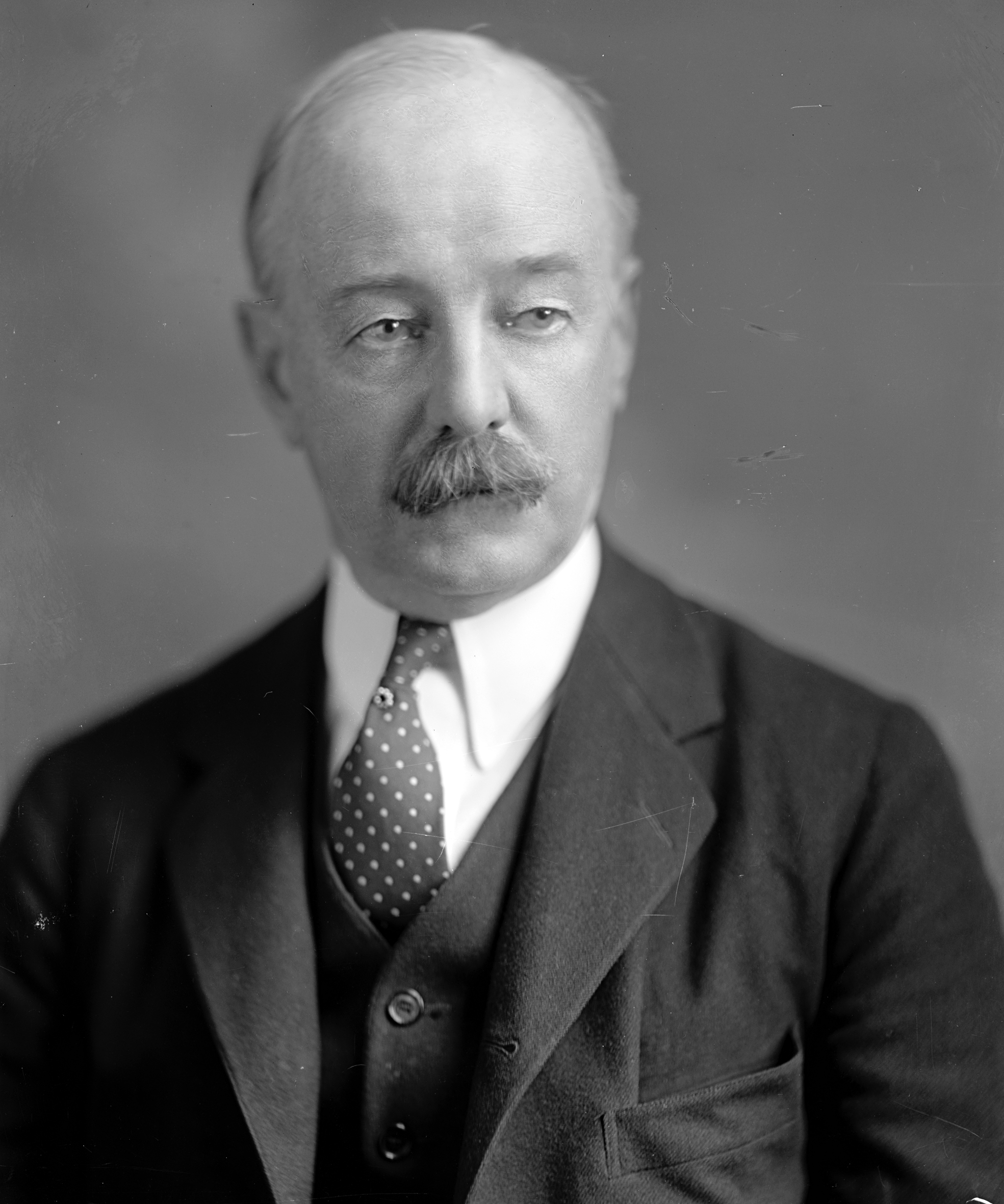
- Harris & Ewing photo, circa 1920

Chief Justice of the Supreme Court of the District of Columbia
- In office May 22, 1918 – December 8, 1929
- Appointed by: Woodrow Wilson
- Preceded by: J. Harry Covington
- Succeeded by: Alfred Adams Wheat

Associate Justice of the Supreme Court of the District of Columbia
- In office October 2, 1914 – May 22, 1918
- Appointed by: Woodrow Wilson
- Preceded by: Job Barnard
- Succeeded by: Jennings Bailey

Member of the U.S. House of Representatives from New Jersey
- In office March 4, 1911 – October 3, 1914
- Preceded by: William H. Wiley
- Succeeded by: Richard W. Parker
- Constituency: 8th district (1911–13); 9th district (1913–14)

Personal details
- Born: Walter Irving McCoy; December 8, 1859 Troy, New York, US
- Died: July 17, 1933 (aged 73) Cambridge, Massachusetts, US
- Resting place: Troy Cemetery
- Party: Democratic
- Education: Harvard University (A.B., A.M.); Harvard Law School (LL.B.)
- Profession: Attorney

Walter Irving McCoy (December 8, 1859 – July 17, 1933) was a United States representative from New Jersey and later was an Associate Justice and Chief Justice of the Supreme Court of the District of Columbia.

== Education and career ==
Born in Troy, New York, on December 8, 1859, McCoy attended the public schools, Troy Academy, Phillips Exeter Academy and Princeton University. He received an Artium Baccalaureus degree in 1882 from Harvard College, an Artium Magister degree in 1886 from the same institution and a Bachelor of Laws in 1886 from Harvard Law School. He was admitted to the bar and practiced law in New York City, New York from 1886 to 1914. He was a trustee of the village of South Orange, New Jersey from 1893 to 1895, from 1901 to 1905, and again in 1910. McCoy was a delegate to the 1904 and 1908 Democratic National Conventions, and was vice president of the Essex County, New Jersey Democratic committee.

== Congressional service ==
McCoy was elected as a Democrat to the United States House of Representatives of the 62nd and 63rd United States Congresses and served from March 4, 1911, until October 3, 1914, when he resigned to accept a federal judgeship.

== Federal judicial service ==
McCoy was nominated by President Woodrow Wilson on September 29, 1914, to an Associate Justice seat on the Supreme Court of the District of Columbia (now the United States District Court for the District of Columbia) vacated by Associate Justice Job Barnard. He was confirmed by the United States Senate on October 2, 1914, and received his commission the same day. His service terminated on May 22, 1918, due to his elevation to be Chief Justice of the same court.

McCoy was nominated by President Wilson on May 16, 1918, to the Chief Justice seat on the Supreme Court of the District of Columbia (now the United States District Court for the District of Columbia) vacated by Chief Justice J. Harry Covington. He was confirmed by the Senate on May 22, 1918, and received his commission the same day. His service terminated on December 8, 1929, due to his retirement.

== Later years and death ==
McCoy resided in Washington, D.C., until 1932, when he moved to Cambridge, Massachusetts, where he died on July 17, 1933. He was interred at Oakwood Cemetery in Troy.

== Sources ==
- United States Congress. "Walter I. McCoy (id: M000376)". Biographical Directory of the United States Congress.
- "McCoy, Walter Irving - Federal Judicial Center". fjc.gov.
- Walter Irving McCoy at The Political Graveyard

U.S. House of Representatives
Preceded by William H. Wiley	Member of the U.S. House of Representatives from New Jersey's 8th congressional district 1911–1913	Succeeded by Eugene Francis Kinkead
Preceded by Eugene Francis Kinkead	Member of the U.S. House of Representatives from New Jersey's 9th congressional district 1913–1914	Succeeded by Richard W. Parker
Legal offices
Preceded by Job Barnard	Associate Justice of the Supreme Court of the District of Columbia; 1914–1918	Succeeded by Jennings Bailey
Preceded by J. Harry Covington	Chief Justice of the Supreme Court of the District of Columbia; 1918–1929	Succeeded by Alfred Adams Wheat
