= Royce Lamberth =

American judge (born 1943)

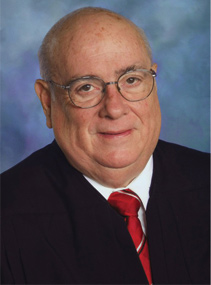

Senior Judge of the United States District Court for the District of Columbia
- Incumbent
- Assumed office July 15, 2013

Chief Judge of the United States District Court for the District of Columbia
- In office May 1, 2008 – July 15, 2013
- Preceded by: Thomas F. Hogan
- Succeeded by: Richard W. Roberts

Presiding Judge of the United States Foreign Intelligence Surveillance Court
- In office May 19, 1995 – May 19, 2002
- Preceded by: Joyce Hens Green
- Succeeded by: Colleen Kollar-Kotelly

Judge of the United States District Court for the District of Columbia
- In office November 16, 1987 – July 15, 2013
- Appointed by: Ronald Reagan
- Preceded by: Barrington D. Parker
- Succeeded by: Christopher R. Cooper

Personal details
- Born: Royce Charles Lamberth; July 16, 1943 (age 83) San Antonio, Texas, U.S.
- Education: University of Texas, Austin (BA, LLB)

Royce Charles Lamberth (/ˈlæmbərθ/; born July 16, 1943) is a senior judge of the United States District Court for the District of Columbia, who formerly served as its chief judge. Since 2015, he has sat as a visiting judge on the United States District Court for the Western District of Texas in San Antonio.

== Education and career ==
Lamberth was born in 1943 in San Antonio, Texas. He graduated with a Bachelor of Arts degree from the University of Texas, where he was a member of the Tejas Club, and from the University of Texas School of Law, receiving a Bachelor of Laws in 1967. He served as a captain in the United States Army Judge Advocate General's Corps from 1968 to 1974, including one year in Vietnam. After that, he became an Assistant United States Attorney for the District of Columbia. In 1978, Lamberth became chief of the civil division of the United States Attorney's Office, a position he held until his appointment to the federal bench.

== Federal judicial service ==
Lamberth was nominated by President Ronald Reagan on March 19, 1987, to the seat on the United States District Court for the District of Columbia vacated by Judge Barrington D. Parker. He was confirmed by the United States Senate on November 13, 1987, and commissioned on November 16, 1987. He served as chief judge from 2008 to 2013. He assumed senior status on July 15, 2013. He also served as presiding judge of the United States Foreign Intelligence Surveillance Court from 1995 to 2002. Since becoming a senior judge, Lamberth has been assigned as a visiting judge in San Antonio for several months per year at the United States District Court for the Western District of Texas.

== Notable cases ==
=== Cobell v. Kempthorne ===
Lamberth presided over Cobell v. Kempthorne, a case in which a group of Native Americans sued the U.S. Department of the Interior for allegedly mismanaging a trust intended for their benefit. Lamberth, appointed to the bench by President Ronald Reagan, was known for speaking his mind and repeatedly ruled for the Native Americans in their class-action lawsuit. His opinions condemned the government and found Interior secretaries Gale Norton and Bruce Babbitt in contempt of court for their handling of the case. The appellate court reversed Lamberth several times, including the contempt charge against Norton. After a particularly harsh opinion in 2005, in which Lamberth lambasted the Interior Department as racist, the government petitioned the Court of Appeals to remove him, alleging that he was too biased to continue with the case. On July 11, 2006, the U.S. Court of Appeals for the District of Columbia Circuit, siding with the government, removed Judge Lamberth from the case.

=== 1983 Beirut barracks bombing case ===
In May 2003, in a case brought by families of the two hundred forty-one servicemen who were killed in the 1983 Beirut barracks bombing, Lamberth ordered the Islamic Republic of Iran to pay US$2.65 billion for the actions of Hezbollah, a Shia militia group determined to be involved in the bombing in Beirut, Lebanon.

=== Guantanamo cases ===
Lamberth has presided over Guantanamo captives habeas corpus petitions.

On December 29, 2016, Lamberth ordered the preservation of the full classified United States Senate Intelligence Committee report on CIA torture. The six thousand–page report had taken Intelligence Committee staff years to prepare. A six hundred–page unclassified summary was published in December 2014, when Democratic Senator Dianne Feinstein chaired the committee, against objections of the Committee's Republican minority. Its publication stirred controversy. Limited copies of the classified report had been made, and human rights workers were concerned that the CIA would work to have all copies of the document destroyed.

=== James Rosen search warrants ===
In 2010, two federal magistrate judges approved a warrant sought by the Justice Department to search personal e-mails and phone records of Fox News reporter James Rosen related to a story about the North Korean nuclear program. In May 2010, Judge Lamberth overruled Magistrate Judge John Facciola's determination that the Justice Department needed to directly notify Rosen of the issuance of the warrant. In May 2013, Lamberth issued an apology from the bench for the clerk's office failure to unseal the search warrant docket entries as Lamberth had ordered in November 2011.

=== Sherley v. Sebelius ===
In August 2010, Lamberth issued a temporary injunction blocking an executive order by President Barack Obama that expanded stem cell research. He indicated the policy violated a ban on federal money being used to destroy embryos, called the Dickey–Wicker Amendment. Susan Jacoby complained that his decision was more a reflection of his politics than a rigorous interpretation of the Dickey–Wicker Amendment.

Judge Lamberth refused to lift the injunction forbidding the research pending the appeal of his ruling, and the United States Court of Appeals for the District of Columbia Circuit issued an order on September 9, 2010, providing for an emergency temporary lifting of the injunction in the case that had forbidden the research, at the request of the Justice Department. A three-judge panel from that court overturned Lamberth's decision in August 2012, and the Supreme Court denied the plaintiff's request for an appeal.

=== In re Kutler ===
In July 2011, Judge Lamberth ordered the release of Richard Nixon's testimony concerning the Watergate scandal. The Justice Department reviewed the decision after an objection from the administration insisting on the continued need for privacy of those involved.

=== Royer v. Federal Bureau of Prisons ===
On January 15, 2014, Judge Lamberth issued an order harshly criticizing the Department of Justice for what he described as its "sneering argument" that a federal prisoner had not been prejudiced by the Department's repeated failure to comply with discovery "because he remains incarcerated." Judge Lamberth went on to write that "[t]he whole point of this litigation is whether defendant can continue to single out plaintiff for special treatment as a terrorist during his continued period of incarceration. Did any supervising attorney ever read this nonsense that is being argued to this Court?" Judge Lamberth proceeded "to grant the inmate plaintiff pretty much all his discovery motion and hammer[ed] the DOJ by telling plaintiff to submit its request for sanctions in the form of award of attorney fees and costs." In response to the Order, the Justice Department moved to substitute new counsel "and remove the appearances of all prior counsel for Defendant in the above-captioned case," Assistant United States Attorneys Charlotte Abel, Laurie Weinstein, Rhonda Campbell and Rhonda Fields. This led one legal commentator to note that "[i]t appears that the government is seeking the clerk’s assistance in fundamentally altering the record, to intentionally conceal the identities of the assistants" who had been reprimanded by Judge Lamberth.

=== United States v. Bolton ===
In June 2020, Lamberth was assigned the case United States v. Bolton, in which the Trump administration sued to prevent the publication of John Bolton's book The Room Where It Happened. On June 20, Lamberth issued a ruling declining to enjoin the publication, but leaving the case open for other remedies.

=== January 6 United States Capitol attack cases ===
Lamberth has presided over a number of the criminal cases of participants in the January 6 attack on the United States Capitol, including Jacob Chansley, the "QAnon Shaman". Lamberth has handed down some of the longest sentences of the more than 480 people convicted for their actions during the attack.

In 2021, Lamberth controversially ordered a DC jail to provide Jacob Chansley the organic food he had requested as a religious accommodation, after Chansley refused to eat for days while awaiting trial. Lamberth eventually ordered Chansley moved to a new jail that would provide him with organic food. Throughout Chansley's case, Lamberth has repeatedly denied Chansley's requests for release and motions to vacate judgment. In 2023, Lamberth denied Chansley's request to throw out his conviction, after Chansley argued footage of the January 6 attack released by Tucker Carlson would have been favorable to his case.

In October 2021, Lamberth held D.C. corrections officials in contempt, citing treatment and civil rights abuses of January 6 participant Christopher Worrell.

By 2023, after several hundred participants had been jailed, tried and convicted for their activities, some House Republicans such as Marjorie Taylor Greene sought to characterize them as "political prisoners." Donald Trump and House Republican Conference chair Elise Stefanik characterized them as "hostages." Lamberth, who had presided over dozens of the cases, remarked in a January 2024 court filing, in part:

I have been shocked to watch some public figures try to rewrite history, claiming rioters behaved "in an orderly fashion" like ordinary tourists, or martyrizing convicted January 6 defendants as "political prisoners" or even, incredibly, "hostages." That is all preposterous. But the Court fears that such destructive, misguided rhetoric could presage further danger to our country.

During one trial, supporters of Taylor James Johnatakis—a participant in the attack Lamberth sentenced to more than 7 years in prison—wrote letters to the court in Johnatakis's support. In response, Lamberth published a written version of his sentencing remarks in an unusual public court filing he styled as “Notes for Sentencing,” and ordered the court clerk to send a copy to those who had written in support of Johnatakis. “In any angry mob, there are leaders and there are followers. Mr. Johnatakis was a leader,” Lamberth said. “He knew what he was doing that day.”

=== Revolution Wind offshore wind farm ===
Danish energy company Ørsted has almost finished Revolution Wind, a large wind farm off the US East Coast. In August 2025, the Trump administration ordered a temporary halt to construction. On 22 December 2025, the US Department of the Interior suspended five offshore wind leases over what it said were 'national security concerns'. Ørsted filed a lawsuit. On 12 January 2026, US district judge Lamberth has overturned the construction freeze. He said the 'Revolution Wind' project is likely to succeed in the ongoing legal dispute.

Lamberth stated that without a preliminary injunction, the project would suffer “irreparable harm” and that the company's request was “in the public interest.”

== See also ==
- Commerce Department trade mission controversy

Legal offices
Preceded by Barrington D. Parker	Judge of the United States District Court for the District of Columbia; 1987–2013	Succeeded by Christopher R. Cooper
Preceded by Joyce Hens Green	Presiding Judge of the United States Foreign Intelligence Surveillance Court; 1995–2002	Succeeded by Colleen Kollar-Kotelly
Preceded by Thomas F. Hogan	Chief Judge of the United States District Court for the District of Columbia; 2008–2013	Succeeded by Richard W. Roberts
