= Jesse C. Adkins =

American judge (1879–1955)

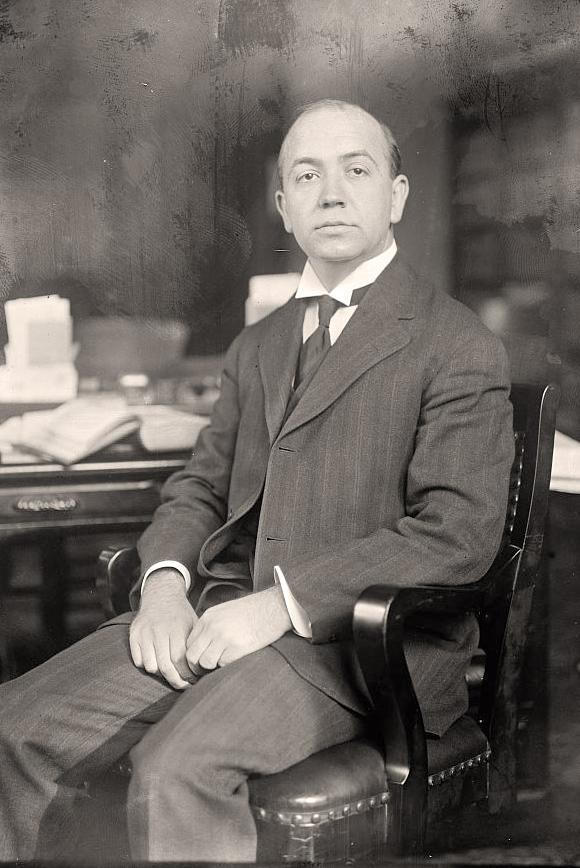

Senior Judge of the United States District Court for the District of Columbia
- In office October 15, 1946 – March 29, 1955

Associate Justice of the District Court of the United States for the District of Columbia
- In office June 17, 1930 – October 15, 1946
- Appointed by: Herbert Hoover
- Preceded by: Alfred Adams Wheat
- Succeeded by: Richmond Bowling Keech

Personal details
- Born: Jesse Corcoran Adkins; April 13, 1879 Knoxville, Tennessee, U.S.
- Died: March 29, 1955 (aged 75) Washington, D.C., U.S.
- Education: Georgetown University Law Center (LLB, LLM)

Jesse Corcoran Adkins (April 13, 1879 – March 29, 1955) was a United States district judge of the United States District Court for the District of Columbia.

== Education and career ==
Born in Knoxville, Tennessee, Adkins received a Bachelor of Laws from Georgetown Law in 1899 and a Master of Laws from the same institution in 1900. He was an Assistant United States Attorney in Washington, D.C. from 1905 to 1908. He was a special assistant to the United States Attorney General in the United States Department of Justice, from 1908 to 1911. He was in private practice of law in Washington, D.C. from 1908 to 1911. He was an Assistant United States Attorney General from 1911 to 1914, and served again as a special assistant to the Attorney General from 1914 to 1916. He returned to private practice in Washington, D.C. from 1916 to 1930. He was a member of the faculty of Georgetown Law from 1910 to 1945.

== Federal judicial service ==
Adkins was nominated by President Herbert Hoover on June 6, 1930, to an Associate Justice seat on the Supreme Court of the District of Columbia (Associate Justice of the District Court of the United States for the District of Columbia from June 25, 1936, now the United States District Court for the District of Columbia) vacated by Associate Justice Alfred Adams Wheat. He was confirmed by the United States Senate on June 17, 1930, and received his commission the same day. He assumed senior status due to a certified disability on October 15, 1946. His service terminated on March 29, 1955, due to his death in Washington, D.C.

== Sources ==
Legal offices
Preceded by Alfred Adams Wheat	Associate Justice of the District Court of the United States for the District of Columbia; 1930–1946	Succeeded by Richmond Bowling Keech
