= Noble, Iowa =

- Unincorporated community
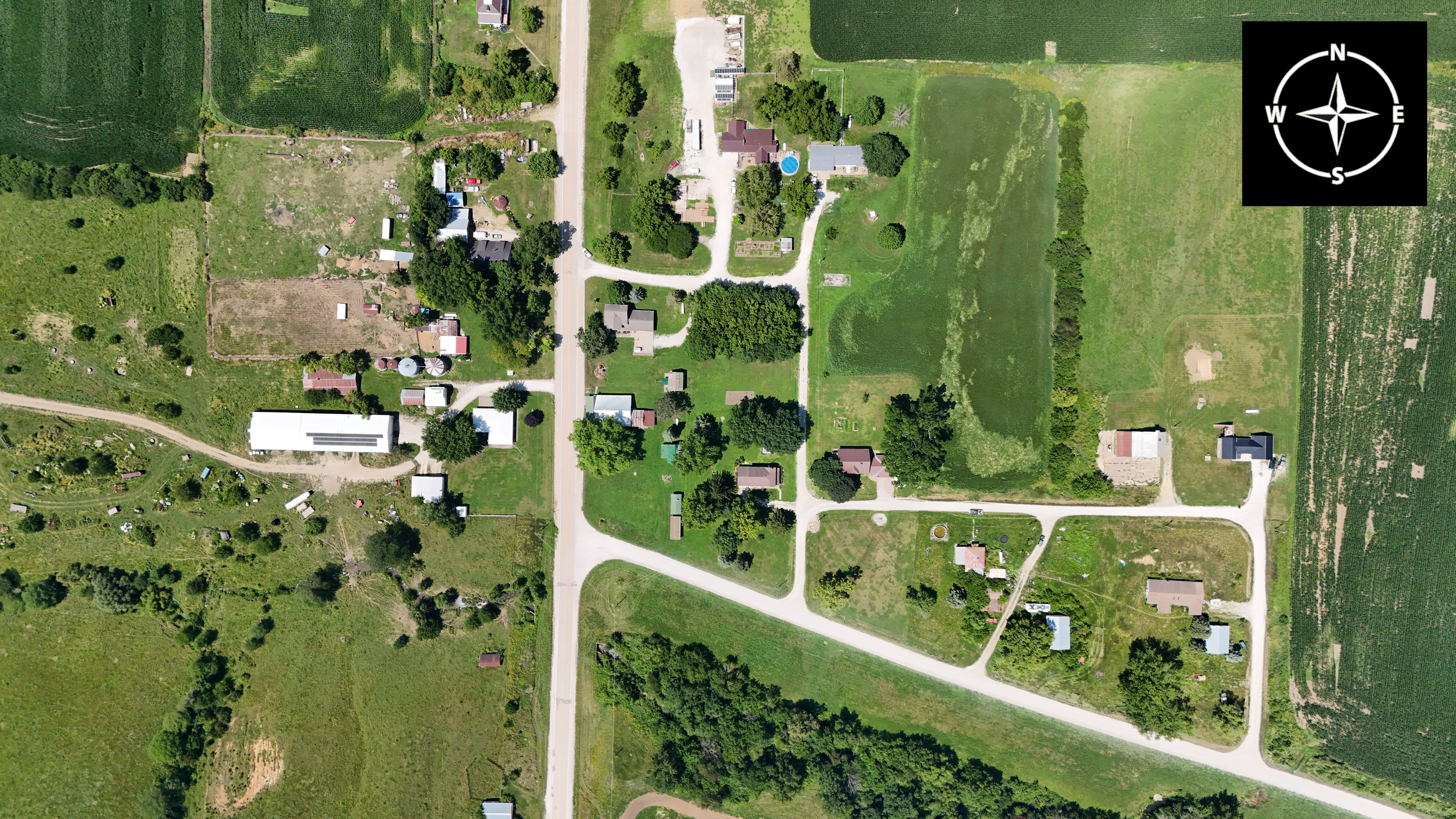
- An aerial view of Noble, taken on July 1, 2025

- Location within Iowa
- Coordinates: 41°09′59″N 91°37′11″W
- Country: United States
- State: Iowa
- County: Washington
- Elevation: 689 ft (210 m)
- Time zone: UTC-6 (Central (CST))
  - Summer (DST): UTC-5 (CDT)
- Area code: 319
- GNIS feature ID: 459531

Noble is an unincorporated community in Washington County, Iowa, United States.

== History ==
Edward Case Noble owned a farm here, and when the Burlington and Western Railway was built, a station was established and a grain mill constructed.

Noble's population was 53 in 1902, and 78 in 1925. The population was 50 in 1940.

== Notable people ==
- Edward C. Eicher, United States District Court judge and Congressman, was born in Noble.
