= Edward Matthew Curran =

American judge

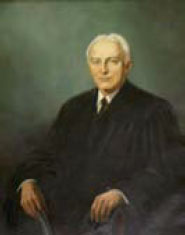

Senior Judge of the United States District Court for the District of Columbia
- In office April 2, 1971 – January 10, 1988

Chief Judge of the United States District Court for the District of Columbia
- In office 1966–1971
- Preceded by: Richmond Bowling Keech
- Succeeded by: John Sirica

Judge of the United States District Court for the District of Columbia
- In office October 16, 1946 – April 2, 1971
- Appointed by: Harry S. Truman
- Preceded by: Daniel William O'Donoghue
- Succeeded by: Charles Robert Richey

30th United States Attorney for the District of Columbia
- In office 1940–1946
- President: Franklin D. Roosevelt; Harry S. Truman
- Preceded by: David Andrew Pine
- Succeeded by: George M. Fay

Personal details
- Born: Edward Matthew Curran; May 10, 1903 Bangor, Maine, U.S.
- Died: January 10, 1988 (aged 84)
- Education: University of Maine (A.B.); Columbus School of Law (LL.B.)

Edward Matthew Curran (May 10, 1903 – January 10, 1988) was a United States district judge of the United States District Court for the District of Columbia.

== Education and career ==
Born in Bangor, Maine, Curran received a Bachelor of Laws from the Columbus School of Law at the Catholic University of America in 1927 and an Artium Baccalaureus degree from the University of Maine in 1928. He was in private practice in Washington, D.C. from 1928 to 1934, and was an assistant corporation counsel for the District of Columbia from 1934 to 1936. He was a Judge of the District of Columbia Police Court from 1936 to 1940, and then served as the United States Attorney for the District of Columbia from 1940 to 1946.

== Federal judicial service ==
Curran received a recess appointment from President Harry S. Truman on October 16, 1946, to an Associate Justice seat on the District Court of the United States for the District of Columbia (Judge of the United States District Court for the District of Columbia after June 25, 1948) vacated by Judge Daniel William O`Donoghue. He was nominated to the same position by President Truman on January 8, 1947. He was confirmed by the United States Senate on February 3, 1947, and received his commission on February 5, 1947. He served as Chief Judge from 1966 to 1971. He was a member of the Judicial Conference of the United States from 1968 to 1971. He assumed senior status on April 2, 1971. His service terminated on January 10, 1988, due to his death.

=== Notable case ===
Curran presided over the trial of Mildred Gillars (aka Axis Sally) for treason in 1949. Gillars was coincidentally also born in Maine (Portland).

== Sources ==
Legal offices
Preceded by Daniel William O'Donoghue	Judge of the United States District Court for the District of Columbia; 1947–1971	Succeeded by Charles Robert Richey
Preceded by Richmond Bowling Keech	Chief Judge of the United States District Court for the District of Columbia; 1966–1971	Succeeded by John Sirica
