= Daniel William O'Donoghue =

American judge

Senior Judge of the United States District Court for the District of Columbia
- In office October 31, 1946 – June 29, 1948

Associate Justice of the District Court of the United States for the District of Columbia
- In office October 28, 1931 – October 31, 1946
- Appointed by: Herbert Hoover
- Preceded by: Frederick Lincoln Siddons
- Succeeded by: Edward Matthew Curran

Personal details
- Born: Daniel William O'Donoghue; October 15, 1876 Washington, D.C.
- Died: June 29, 1948 (aged 71)
- Education: Georgetown University (A.B., A.M., Ph.D.); Georgetown Law (LL.B., LL.M.)

Daniel William O'Donoghue (October 15, 1876 – June 29, 1948) was an associate justice of the District Court of the United States for the District of Columbia.

== Education and career ==
Born on October 15, 1876, in Washington, D.C., O'Donoghue received an Artium Baccalaureus degree in 1897, an Artium Magister degree in 1898 and a Doctor of Philosophy in 1899 from Georgetown University and received a Bachelor of Laws in 1899 and a Master of Laws in 1900 from Georgetown Law. He was in private practice in Washington, D.C. from 1900 to 1931. He was a faculty member at Georgetown Law from 1904 to 1934.

== Federal judicial service ==
O'Donoghue received a recess appointment from President Herbert Hoover on October 28, 1931, to an A associate justice seat on the Supreme Court of the District of Columbia (Associate Justice of the District Court of the United States for the District of Columbia from June 25, 1936, Judge of the United States District Court for the District of Columbia from June 25, 1948) vacated by Associate Justice Frederick Lincoln Siddons. He was nominated to the same position by President Hoover on December 15, 1931. He was confirmed by the United States Senate on January 26, 1932, and received his commission on February 23, 1932. Later that year, Congress passed an appropriations bill that reduced his wages because, as a judge on a D.C. circuit, the prevailing view was that he presided over a legislative court with no Article III protections for its judges. Believing himself to be an Article III judge with the protection of the Compensation Clause, he sued in the United States Court of Claims for the difference in wages. The case reached the United States Supreme Court in O'Donoghue v. United States, and that court decided in his favor by holding that D.C.'s courts were both constitutional courts under Article III and legislative courts.

He assumed senior status on October 31, 1946. His service terminated on June 29, 1948, due to his death.

== Personal life ==
O'Donoghue married and had two children, a boy and a girl. His son, Daniel William O'Donoghue, Jr. became a lawyer specializing in civil litigation and practiced for over fifty-five years. His son was one of the lawyers on the team that argued O'Donoghue v. United States for the justices.

== Sources ==
Legal offices
Preceded by Frederick Lincoln Siddons	Associate Justice of the District Court of the United States for the District of Columbia; 1931–1946	Succeeded by Edward Matthew Curran
