= Woodlawn Cemetery Gates and Shelter =

- U.S. National Register of Historic Places
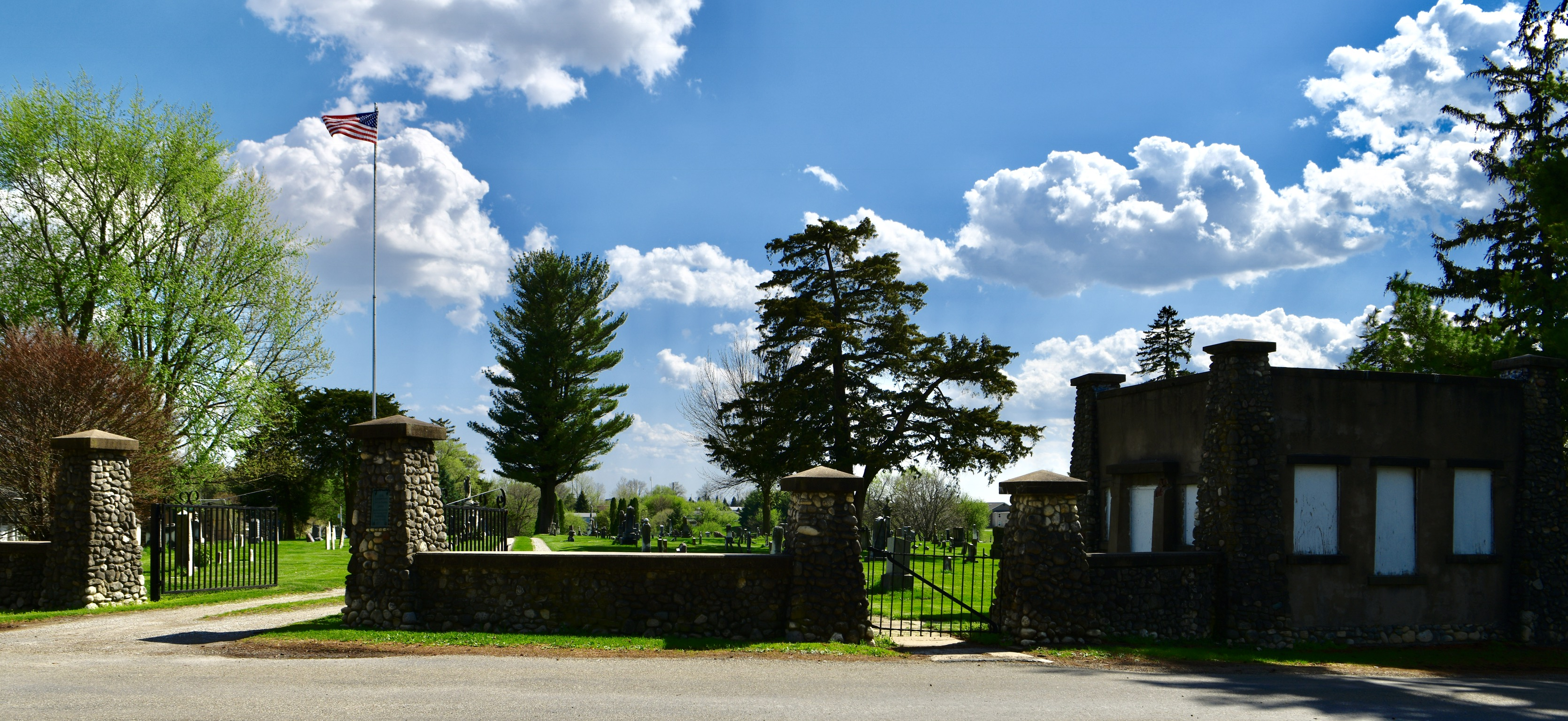

- Location within Iowa Location within the United States
- Location: 501 W. Adams; Washington, Iowa
- Coordinates: 41°17′39.5″N 91°41′48.7″W
- Area: 32 acres (13 ha)
- Built: 1917, 1926
- Architectural style: Egyptian Revival
- NRHP reference No.: 16000688
- Added to NRHP: October 4, 2016

Woodlawn Cemetery Gates and Shelter is a historic building and structure located in Washington, Iowa, United States. They were listed together on the National Register of Historic Places in 2016.

Originally named City Cemetery, Woodlawn was established southwest of the city limits in 1840. Jonathan H. Wilson donated the land. The first interment occurred in December of that year and the first headstone was erected the following year. The Washington Improvement League was established in 1915. They raised funds for civic improvements, most of which benefited the cemetery. The entrance gates, and fence were completed in 1917 and the shelter house was completed in 1926. They were both executed in the rather rare Egyptian Revival style. The fence and gates feature six obelisk posts and three iron gates. The posts are composed of river rock and capped by a square concrete slab with a flat pyramid top. The shelter house is a square clay tile and stucco building with stone obelisks at the corners.
