= United States District Court for the District of Columbia =

United States federal district court

- (D.D.C.)

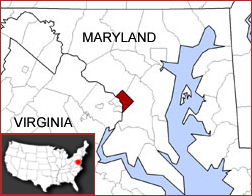
- Location of the U.S. District Court for the District of Columbia
- Location: E. Barrett Prettyman U.S. Courthouse (Washington, D.C., U.S.)
- Appeals to: District of Columbia Circuit
- Established: March 3, 1863
- Judges: 15
- Chief Judge: James Boasberg

Officers of the court
- U.S. Attorney: Jeanine Pirro
- U.S. Marshal: Lamont Ruffin (acting)
- www.dcd.uscourts.gov

The United States District Court for the District of Columbia (in case citations, D.D.C.) is a federal district court in Washington, D.C. Along with the United States District Court for the District of Hawaii and the High Court of American Samoa, it also sometimes handles federal issues that arise in the territory of American Samoa, which has no local federal court or territorial court.

Appeals from the District Court are taken to the United States Court of Appeals for the District of Columbia Circuit, except for patent claims and claims against the United States federal government under the Tucker Act, which are appealed to the Federal Circuit.

The United States Attorney for the District of Columbia is Jeanine Pirro.

== History ==
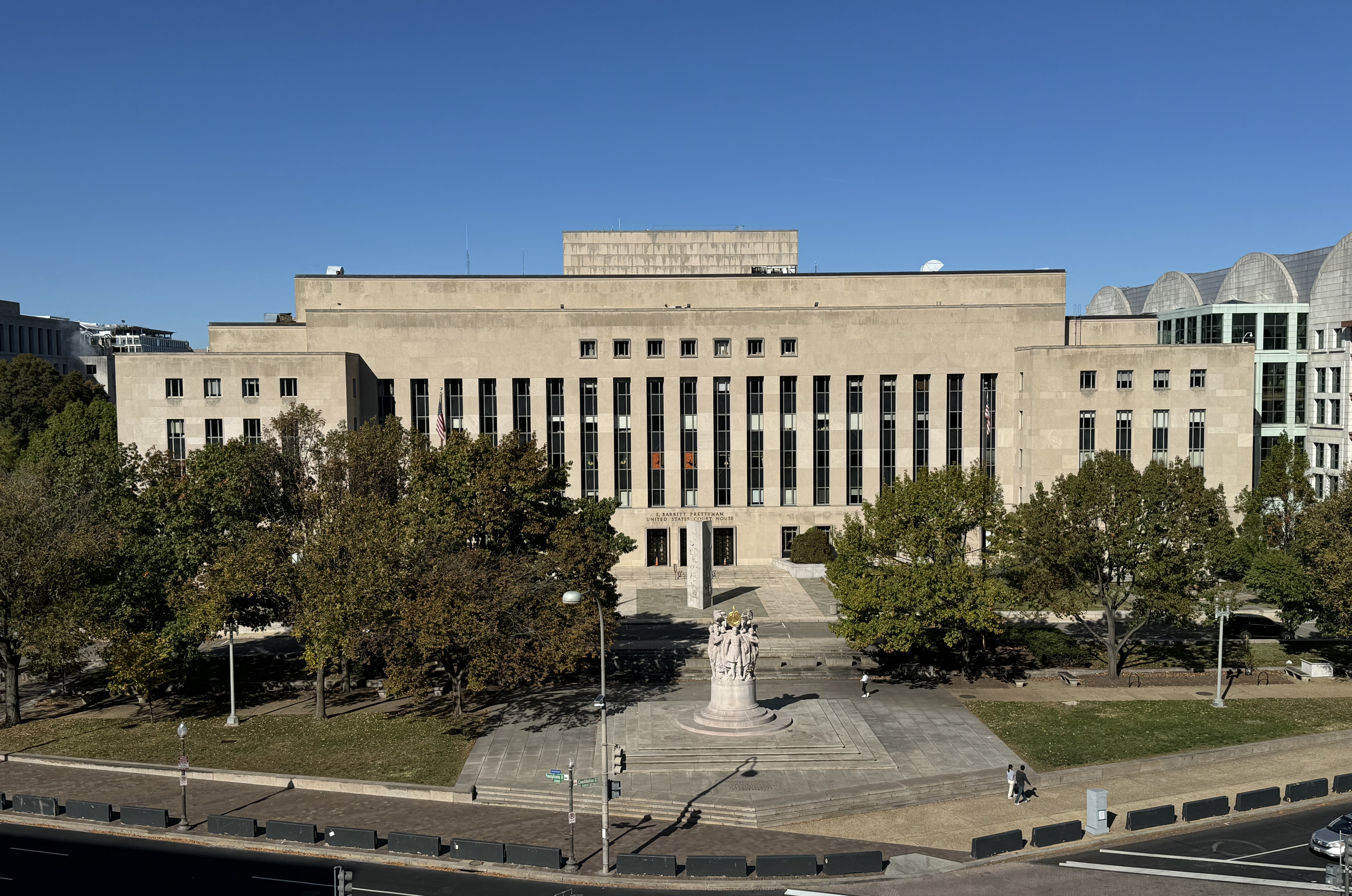
E. Barrett Prettyman Federal Courthouse at 333 Constitution Avenue, N.W. in Washington, D.C.

The court was established by Congress in 1863 as the Supreme Court of the District of Columbia, replacing the abolished circuit and district courts of the District of Columbia that had been in place since 1801. The court consisted of four justices, including a chief justice, and was granted the same powers and jurisdiction as the earlier circuit court. Any of the justices could convene a United States circuit court or a local criminal court. In 1936, Congress renamed the court the District Court of the United States for the District of Columbia. Its current name was adopted in 1948, and from then on justices were known as judges.

Originally housed in the former District of Columbia City Hall, the court now sits in the E. Barrett Prettyman Federal Courthouse located at 333 Constitution Avenue, N.W., in Washington, D.C. The District has no local district attorney or equivalent, and so local prosecutorial matters also fall into the jurisdiction of the United States Attorney for the District of Columbia. Assistant United States attorneys (AUSAs) are tasked with prosecution of not only federal crimes but also crimes that would normally be left to the state prosecutor's discretion. The District Court has the largest U.S. Attorney's Office in the nation, with around 250 assistant U.S. attorneys.

== Active judges ==
As of June 7, 2026:

#	Title	Judge	Duty station	Born	Term of service			Appointed by
#	Title	Judge	Duty station	Born	Active	Chief	Senior	Appointed by
98	Chief Judge	James Boasberg	Washington, D.C.	1963	2011–present	2023–present	—	Obama
100	District Judge	Rudolph Contreras	Washington, D.C.	1962	2012–present	—	—	Obama
102	District Judge	Christopher R. Cooper	Washington, D.C.	1966	2014–present	—	—	Obama
103	District Judge	Tanya Chutkan	Washington, D.C.	1962	2014–present	—	—	Obama
104	District Judge	Randolph Moss	Washington, D.C.	1961	2014–present	—	—	Obama
105	District Judge	Amit Mehta	Washington, D.C.	1971	2014–present	—	—	Obama
106	District Judge	Timothy J. Kelly	Washington, D.C.	1969	2017–present	—	—	Trump
107	District Judge	Trevor N. McFadden	Washington, D.C.	1978	2017–present	—	—	Trump
108	District Judge	Dabney Friedrich	Washington, D.C.	1967	2017–present	—	—	Trump
109	District Judge	Carl J. Nichols	Washington, D.C.	1970	2019–present	—	—	Trump
111	District Judge	Jia M. Cobb	Washington, D.C.	1980	2021–present	—	—	Biden
112	District Judge	Ana C. Reyes	Washington, D.C.	1974	2023–present	—	—	Biden
113	District Judge	Loren AliKhan	Washington, D.C.	1983	2023–present	—	—	Biden
114	District Judge	Amir Ali	Washington, D.C.	1985	2024–present	—	—	Biden
115	District Judge	Sparkle L. Sooknanan	Washington, D.C.	1983	2025–present	—	—	Biden
77	Senior Judge	Thomas F. Hogan	inactive	1938	1982–2008	2001–2008	2008–present	Reagan
81	Senior Judge	Royce Lamberth	Washington, D.C. San Antonio, Texas (Note: Judge Lamberth has sat with the Western District of Texas for several months each year since 2015.)	1943	1987–2013	2008–2013	2013–present	Reagan
83	Senior Judge	Paul L. Friedman	Washington, D.C.	1944	1994–2009	—	2009–present	Clinton
85	Senior Judge	Emmet G. Sullivan	Washington, D.C.	1947	1994–2021	—	2021–present	Clinton
88	Senior Judge	Colleen Kollar-Kotelly	Washington, D.C.	1943	1997–2023	—	2023–present	Clinton
89	Senior Judge	Henry H. Kennedy Jr.	inactive	1948	1997–2011	—	2011–present	Clinton
90	Senior Judge	Richard W. Roberts	inactive	1953	1998–2016	2013–2016	2016–present	Clinton
91	Senior Judge	Ellen Segal Huvelle	inactive	1948	1999–2014	—	2014–present	Clinton
92	Senior Judge	Reggie Walton	Washington, D.C.	1949	2001–2015	—	2015–present	G.W. Bush
93	Senior Judge	John D. Bates	Washington, D.C.	1946	2001–2014	—	2014–present	G.W. Bush
94	Senior Judge	Richard J. Leon	Washington, D.C.	1949	2002–2016	—	2016–present	G.W. Bush
96	Senior Judge	Beryl Howell	Washington, D.C.	1956	2010–2024	2016–2023	2024–present	Obama
99	Senior Judge	Amy Berman Jackson	Washington, D.C.	1954	2011–2023	—	2023–present	Obama

== Former judges ==
#	Judge	State	Born–died	Active service	Chief Judge	Senior status	Appointed by	Reason for termination
1	David Kellogg Cartter	DC	1812–1887	1863–1887	1863–1887	—	Lincoln	death
2	George P. Fisher	DC	1817–1899	1863–1870	—	—	Lincoln	resignation
3	Abram B. Olin	DC	1808–1879	1863–1879	—	—	Lincoln	retirement
4	Andrew Wylie	DC	1814–1905	1863 (Note: Confirmed by the United States Senate on March 12, 1863; confirmation was reconsidered on March 13, 1863, with no subsequent vote; his nomination expired March 14, 1863.); 1863–1885 (Note: Recess appointment; formally nominated January 5, 1864; confirmed by the Senate on January 20 and received commission the same day.)	—	—	Lincoln; Lincoln	not confirmed retirement
5	David Campbell Humphreys	DC	1817–1879	1870–1879	—	—	Grant	death
6	Arthur MacArthur Sr.	DC	1815–1896	1870–1887	—	—	Grant	retirement
7	Alexander Burton Hagner	DC	1826–1915	1879–1903	—	—	Hayes	retirement
8	Walter Smith Cox	DC	1826–1902	1879–1899	—	—	Hayes	retirement
9	Charles Pinckney James	DC	1818–1899	1879–1892 (Note: Recess appointment; formally nominated on December 1, 1879, confirmed by the Senate December 10, 1879, and received commission the same day.)	—	—	Hayes	retirement
10	William Matthews Merrick	DC	1818–1889	1885–1889 (Note: Recess appointment; formally nominated on December 14, 1885, confirmed by the Senate March 15, 1856, and received commission the same day.)	—	—	Cleveland	death
11	Martin V. Montgomery	DC	1840–1898	1887–1892 (Note: Recess appointment; formally nominated on December 20, 1887, confirmed by the Senate January 26, 1888, and received commission the same day.)	—	—	Cleveland	resignation
12	Edward Franklin Bingham	DC	1828–1907	1887–1903 (Note: Recess appointment; formally nominated on December 20, 1887, confirmed by the Senate January 23, 1888, and received commission the same day.)	1887–1903	—	Cleveland	retirement
13	Andrew Coyle Bradley	DC	1844–1902	1889–1902	—	—	B. Harrison	death
14	Louis E. McComas	DC	1846–1907	1892–1899 (Note: Recess appointment; formally nominated on December 6, 1892, confirmed by the Senate January 25, 1893, and received commission the same day.)	—	—	B. Harrison	resignation
15	Charles Cleaves Cole	DC	1841–1905	1893–1901	—	—	B. Harrison	resignation
16	Harry M. Clabaugh	DC	1856–1914	1899–1903	—	—	McKinley	reappointment
16.1	Harry M. Clabaugh	DC	1856–1914	1903–1914 (Note: Recess appointment; formally nominated on November 10, 1903, confirmed by the Senate November 16, 1903, and received commission the same day.)	1903–1914	—	T. Roosevelt	death
17	Job Barnard	DC	1844–1923	1899–1914 (Note: Recess appointment; formally nominated December 11, 1899, confirmed by the Senate December 19, 1899, and received commission the same day.)	—	—	McKinley	retirement
18	Thomas H. Anderson	DC	1848–1916	1901–1916 (Note: Recess appointment; formally nominated December 5, 1901, confirmed by the Senate February 4, 1902, and received commission February 6, 1902.)	—	—	McKinley (Note: Judge Anderson was given a recess appointment by President McKinley.); T. Roosevelt (Note: Judge Anderson was nominated by President McKinley but was appointed to the Court by (i.e., received his commission from) President Roosevelt.)	death
19	Ashley Mulgrave Gould	DC	1859–1921	1902–1921	—	—	T. Roosevelt	death
20	Jeter C. Pritchard	DC	1857–1921	1903–1904	—	—	T. Roosevelt	elevation
21	Daniel Thew Wright	DC	1864–1943	1903–1914	—	—	T. Roosevelt	resignation
22	Wendell Phillips Stafford	DC	1861–1953	1904–1931 (Note: Recess appointment; formally nominated December 6, 1904, confirmed by the Senate December 13, 1904, and received commission the same day.)	—	—	T. Roosevelt	retirement
23	J. Harry Covington	DC	1870–1942	1914–1918	1914–1918	—	Wilson	resignation
24	Walter I. McCoy	DC	1859–1933	1914–1918	—	—	Wilson	reappointment
24.1	Walter I. McCoy	DC	1859–1933	1918–1929	1918–1929	—	Wilson	retirement
25	Frederick Lincoln Siddons	DC	1864–1931	1915–1931	—	—	Wilson	death
26	William Hitz	DC	1872–1935	1916–1931 (Note: Recess appointment; formally nominated December 15, 1916, confirmed by the Senate January 2, 1917, and received commission the same day.)	—	—	Wilson	elevation
27	Jennings Bailey	DC	1867–1963	1918–1950	—	1950–1963	Wilson	death
28	Adolph A. Hoehling Jr.	DC	1868–1941	1921–1927	—	—	Harding	resignation
29	Peyton Gordon	DC	1870–1946	1928–1941	—	1941–1946	Coolidge	death
30	Alfred Adams Wheat	DC	1867–1943	1929–1930	—	—	Hoover	reappointment
30.1	Alfred Adams Wheat	DC	1867–1943	1930–1941	1930–1941	1941–1943	Hoover	death
31	Jesse C. Adkins	DC	1879–1955	1930–1946	—	1946–1955	Hoover	death
32	Oscar Raymond Luhring	DC	1879–1944	1930–1944	—	—	Hoover	death
33	Joseph Winston Cox	DC	1875–1939	1930–1939	—	—	Hoover	death
34	James McPherson Proctor	DC	1882–1953	1931–1948	—	—	Hoover	elevation
35	F. Dickinson Letts	DC	1875–1965	1931–1961 (Note: Recess appointment; formally nominated December 15, 1931, confirmed by the Senate February 17, 1932, and received commission February 20, 1932.)	1958–1959	1961–1965	Hoover	death
36	Daniel William O'Donoghue	DC	1876–1948	1931–1946 (Note: Recess appointment; formally nominated December 15, 1931, confirmed by the Senate January 26, 1932, and received commission February 23, 1932.)	—	1946–1948	Hoover	death
37	Bolitha James Laws	DC	1891–1958	1938–1945	—	—	F. Roosevelt	reappointment
37.1	Bolitha James Laws	DC	1891–1958	1945–1948	1945–1948	—	F. Roosevelt	reassignment
37.2	Bolitha James Laws	DC	1891–1958	1948–1958	1948–1958	—	operation of law	death
38	Thomas Alan Goldsborough	DC	1877–1951	1939–1951	—	—	F. Roosevelt	death
39	James Ward Morris	DC	1890–1960	1939–1960	—	—	F. Roosevelt	death
40	David Andrew Pine	DC	1891–1970	1940–1965	1959–1961	1965–1970	F. Roosevelt	death
41	Matthew Francis McGuire	DC	1898–1986	1941–1966	1961–1966	1966–1986	F. Roosevelt	death
42	Edward C. Eicher	DC	1878–1944	1942–1944	1942–1944	—	F. Roosevelt	death
43	Henry Albert Schweinhaut	DC	1902–1970	1944–1956	—	1956–1970	F. Roosevelt	death
44	Alexander Holtzoff	DC	1886–1969	1945–1967	—	1967–1969	Truman	death
45	Richmond Bowling Keech	DC	1896–1986	1946–1966 (Note: Recess appointment; formally nominated January 8, 1947, confirmed by the Senate January 22, 1947, and received commission January 24, 1947.)	1966	1966–1986	Truman	death
46	Edward Matthew Curran	DC	1903–1988	1946–1971 (Note: Recess appointment; formally nominated January 8, 1947, confirmed by the Senate February 3, 1947, and received commission February 5, 1947.)	1966–1971	1971–1988	Truman	death
47	Edward Allen Tamm	DC	1906–1985	1948–1965 (Note: Recess appointment; formally nominated January 13, 1949, confirmed by the Senate March 29, 1949, and received commission April 1, 1949.)	—	—	Truman	elevation
48	James Robert Kirkland	DC	1903–1958	1949–1958 (Note: Recess appointment; formally nominated January 5, 1950, confirmed by the Senate March 8, 1950, and received commission March 9, 1950.)	—	—	Truman	death
49	Burnita Shelton Matthews	DC	1894–1988	1949–1968 (Note: Recess appointment; formally nominated January 5, 1950, confirmed by the Senate April 4, 1950, and received commission April 7, 1950.)	—	1968–1988	Truman	death
50	Charles F. McLaughlin	DC	1887–1976	1949–1964 (Note: Recess appointment; formally nominated January 5, 1950, confirmed by the Senate February 27, 1950, and received commission March 1, 1950.)	—	1964–1976	Truman	death
51	Walter M. Bastian	DC	1891–1975	1950–1954 (Note: Recess appointment; formally nominated November 27, 1950, confirmed by the Senate December 14, 1950, and received commission December 22, 1950.)	—	—	Truman	elevation
52	Luther Youngdahl	DC	1896–1978	1951–1966	—	1966–1978	Truman	death
53	Joseph Charles McGarraghy	DC	1897–1975	1954–1967	—	1967–1975	Eisenhower	death
54	John Sirica	DC	1904–1992	1957–1977	1971–1974	1977–1992	Eisenhower	death
55	George Luzerne Hart Jr.	DC	1905–1984	1958–1979 (Note: Recess appointment; formally nominated January 17, 1959, confirmed by the Senate September 9, 1959, and received commission September 10, 1959.)	1974–1975	1979–1984	Eisenhower	death
56	Leonard Patrick Walsh	DC	1904–1980	1959–1971	—	1971–1980	Eisenhower	death
57	William Blakely Jones	DC	1907–1979	1962–1977	1975–1977	1977–1979	Kennedy	death
58	Spottswood Robinson III	DC	1916–1998	1964–1966 (Note: Recess appointment; formally nominated February 3, 1964, confirmed by the Senate July 1, 1964, and received commission July 2, 1964.)	—	—	L. Johnson	elevation
59	Howard Francis Corcoran	DC	1906–1989	1965–1977	—	1977–1989	L. Johnson	death
60	William B. Bryant	DC	1911–2005	1965–1982	1977–1981	1982–2005	L. Johnson	death
61	Oliver Gasch	DC	1906–1999	1965–1981	—	1981–1999	L. Johnson	death
62	John Lewis Smith Jr.	DC	1912–1992	1966–1983	1981–1982	1983–1992	L. Johnson	death
63	Aubrey Eugene Robinson Jr.	DC	1922–2000	1966–1992	1982–1992	1992–2000	L. Johnson	death
64	Joseph Cornelius Waddy	DC	1911–1978	1967–1978	—	—	L. Johnson	death
65	Gerhard Gesell	DC	1910–1993	1967–1993	—	1993–1993	L. Johnson	death
66	June Lazenby Green	DC	1914–2001	1968–1984	—	1984–2001	L. Johnson	death
67	John H. Pratt	DC	1910–1995	1968–1989	—	1989–1995	L. Johnson	death
68	Barrington D. Parker	DC	1915–1993	1969–1985	—	1985–1993	Nixon	death
69	Charles Robert Richey	DC	1923–1997	1971–1997	—	1997–1997	Nixon	death
70	Thomas Aquinas Flannery	DC	1918–2007	1971–1985	—	1985–2007	Nixon	death
71	Louis F. Oberdorfer	DC	1919–2013	1977–1992	—	1992–2013	Carter	death
72	Harold H. Greene	DC	1923–2000	1978–1995	—	1995–2000	Carter	death
73	John Garrett Penn	DC	1932–2007	1979–1998	1992–1997	1998–2007	Carter	death
74	Joyce Hens Green	DC	1928–2024	1979–1995	—	1995–2024	Carter	death
75	Norma Holloway Johnson	DC	1932–2011	1980–2001	1997–2001	2001–2003	Carter	retirement
76	Thomas Penfield Jackson	DC	1937–2013	1982–2002	—	2002–2004	Reagan	retirement
78	Stanley S. Harris	MD	1927–2021	1983–1996	—	1996–2001	Reagan	retirement
79	George H. Revercomb	VA	1929–1993	1985–1993	—	—	Reagan	death
80	Stanley Sporkin	MD	1932–2020	1985–1999	—	1999–2000	Reagan	retirement
82	Michael Boudin	DC	1939–2025	1990–1992	—	—	G. H. W. Bush	resignation
84	Gladys Kessler	DC	1938–2023	1994–2007	—	2007–2023	Clinton	death
86	Ricardo M. Urbina	DC	1946–2024	1994–2011	—	2011–2012	Clinton	retirement
87	James Robertson	DC	1938–2019	1994–2008	—	2008–2010	Clinton	retirement
95	Rosemary M. Collyer	DC	1945–2026	2002–2016	—	2016–2026	G.W. Bush	death
97	Robert L. Wilkins	DC	1963–present	2010–2014	—	—	Obama	elevation
101	Ketanji Brown Jackson	DC	1970–present	2013–2021	—	—	Obama	elevation
110	Florence Y. Pan	DC	1966–present	2021–2022	—	—	Biden	elevation

== Chief judges ==
Chief
as Chief Justice
Cartter	1863–1887
Bingham	1887–1903
Clabaugh	1903–1914
Covington	1914–1918
McCoy	1918–1929
Wheat	1930–1941
Eicher	1942–1944
Laws	1945–1948
as Chief Judge
Laws	1948–1958
Letts	1958–1959
Pine	1959–1961
McGuire	1961–1966
Keech	1966
Curran	1966–1971
Sirica	1971–1974
Hart	1974–1975
Jones	1975–1977
Bryant	1977–1981
Smith	1981–1982
A. Robinson	1982–1992
Penn	1992–1997
Johnson	1997–2001
Hogan	2001–2008
Lamberth	2008–2013
Roberts	2013–2016
Howell	2016–2023
Boasberg	2023–present

Chief judges have administrative responsibilities with respect to their district court. Unlike the Supreme Court, where one justice is specifically nominated to be chief, the office of chief judge rotates among the district court judges. To be chief, a judge must have been in active service on the court for at least one year, be under the age of 65, and have not previously served as chief judge.

A vacancy is filled by the judge highest in seniority among the group of qualified judges. The chief judge serves for a term of seven years, or until age 70, whichever occurs first. The age restrictions are waived if no members of the court would otherwise be qualified for the position.

When the office was created in 1948, the chief judge was the longest-serving judge who had not elected to retire, on what has since 1958 been known as senior status, or declined to serve as chief judge. After August 6, 1959, judges could not become or remain chief after turning 70 years old. The current rules have been in operation since October 1, 1982.

== Succession of seats ==
- Associate Justices Clabaugh, McCoy, Wheat and Laws were elevated to Chief Justice.
- Chief Justice Laws was assigned to the new Seat 13 by operation of law upon the abolition of the Chief Justice Seat 1.
- Judge Chutkan was assigned to the new Seat 17 as Judge Bates assumed duties as Director of the Administrative Office of the United States Courts on July 1, 2013 (see 28 U.S.C. § 133(b)). Bates's Seat 11 was abolished as Bates assumed senior status on October 12, 2014.

Seat 1
Seat established on March 3, 1863 by 12 Stat. 762
Chief Justice
Cartter	1863–1887
Bingham	1887–1903
Clabaugh (Chief)	1903–1914
Covington	1914–1918
McCoy (Chief)	1918–1929
Wheat (Chief)	1930–1941
Eicher	1942–1944
Laws (Chief)	1945–1948
Chief Justice abolished on September 1, 1948 by 62 Stat. 869, 985

Seat 2
Seat established on March 3, 1863 by 12 Stat. 762
Fisher	1863–1870
Humphreys	1870–1879
James	1879–1892
Cole	1893–1901
Anderson	1902–1916
Hitz	1917–1931
Proctor	1931–1948
Tamm	1949–1965
Gasch	1965–1981
T. Jackson	1982–2002
Collyer	2002–2016
Kelly	2017–present

Seat 3
Seat established on March 3, 1863 by 12 Stat. 762
Olin	1863–1879
Hagner	1879–1903
Wright	1903–1914
Siddons	1915–1931
O'Donoghue	1932–1946
Curran	1947–1971
Richey	1971–1997
Roberts	1998–2016
Nichols	2019–present

Seat 4
Seat established on March 3, 1863 by 12 Stat. 762
Wylie	1863–1885
Merrick	1885–1889
Bradley	1889–1902
Gould	1902–1921
Hoehling Jr.	1921–1927
Gordon	1928–1941
McGuire	1941–1966
A. Robinson, Jr.	1966–1992
Urbina	1994–2011
Contreras	2012–present

Seat 5
Seat established on June 21, 1870 by 16 Stat. 160
MacArthur, Sr.	1870–1887
Montgomery	1888–1892
McComas	1893–1899
Clabaugh (Associate)	1899–1903
Pritchard	1903–1904
Stafford	1904–1931
Letts	1932–1961
Jones	1962–1977
Oberdorfer	1977–1992
Sullivan	1994–2021
Cobb	2021–present

Seat 6
Seat established on February 25, 1879 by 20 Stat. 320
W. Cox	1879–1899
Barnard	1899–1914
McCoy (Associate)	1914–1918
Bailey	1918–1950
Bastian	1950–1954
McGarraghy	1954–1967
Parker	1969–1985
Lamberth	1987–2013
Cooper	2014–present

Seat 7
Seat established on December 20, 1928 by 45 Stat. 1056
Wheat (Associate)	1929–1930
Adkins	1930–1946
Keech	1947–1966
Waddy	1967–1978
Penn	1979–1998
Huvelle	1999–2014
Mehta	2014–present

Seat 8
Seat established on June 19, 1930 by 46 Stat. 785
Luhring	1930–1944
Schweinhaut	1944–1956
Sirica	1957–1977
Greene	1978–1995
Kollar-Kotelly	1997–2023
Reyes	2023–present

Seat 9
Seat established on June 19, 1930 by 46 Stat. 785
J. Cox	1930–1939
Pine	1940–1965
Bryant	1965–1982
Hogan	1982–2008
Boasberg	2011–present

Seat 10
Seat established on May 31, 1938 by 52 Stat. 584
Laws (Associate)	1938–1945
Holtzoff	1945–1967
Pratt	1968–1989
Boudin	1990–1992
Kessler	1994–2007
A. Jackson	2011–2023
AliKhan	2023–present

Seat 11
Seat established on May 31, 1938 by 52 Stat. 584
Goldsborough	1939–1951
Youngdahl	1951–1966
Smith Jr.	1966–1983
Harris	1983–1996
Bates	2001–2014
Seat abolished on October 12, 2014 (temporary judgeship expired)

Seat 12
Seat established on May 31, 1938 by 52 Stat. 584
Morris	1939–1960
S. Robinson III	1964–1966
Gesell	1967–1993
Friedman	1994–2009
Howell	2010–2024
Ali	2024–present

Seat 13
Seat established on September 1, 1948 by 62 Stat. 869
Laws (Judge)	1948–1958
Walsh	1959–1971
Flannery	1971–1985
Revercomb	1985–1993
Robertson	1994–2008
Wilkins	2010–2014
Moss	2014–present

Seat 14
Seat established on August 3, 1949 by 63 Stat. 493
McLaughlin	1949–1964
Corcoran	1965–1977
J. H. Green	1979–1995
Kennedy Jr.	1997–2011
K. Jackson	2013–2021
Pan	2021–2022
Sooknanan	2025–present

Seat 15
Seat established on August 3, 1949 by 63 Stat. 493
Matthews	1950–1968
J. L. Green	1968–1984
Sporkin	1985–1999
Walton	2001–2015
Friedrich	2017–present

Seat 16
Seat established on August 3, 1949 by 63 Stat. 493
Kirkland	1950–1958
Hart Jr.	1959–1979
Johnson	1980–2001
Leon	2002–2016
McFadden	2017–present

Seat 17
Seat established on July 1, 2013 pursuant to 104 Stat. 5089 (temporary)
Seat became permanent upon the abolition of Seat 11 on October 12, 2014
Chutkan	2014–present

== List of U.S. Attorneys ==
- United States Attorney for the District of Columbia

== See also ==
- Courts of the United States
- List of current United States district judges
- List of United States federal courthouses in the District of Columbia
