= Fried, Frank, Harris, Shriver & Jacobson =

International law firm headquartered in New York City

Fried, Frank, Harris, Shriver & Jacobson LLP
- Headquarters: 1 New York Plaza, New York City
- No. of offices: 5
- No. of attorneys: 800
- Major practice areas: General Practice
- Key people: Kenneth I. Rosh, Chairman Steven Epstein, Managing Partner Scott B. Luftglass, Vice Chairman
- Revenue: ▲US$ $1 billion (2024)
- Date founded: 1890s
- Company type: Limited liability partnership (LLP)
- Website: friedfrank.com

Fried, Frank, Harris, Shriver & Jacobson LLP (known as Fried Frank), is an international law firm headquartered in New York City. The firm also has offices in Washington, D.C., London, Frankfurt, and Brussels. It has more than 800 attorneys worldwide.

== History ==
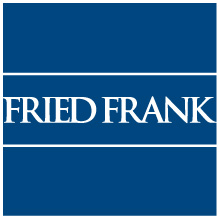
Former logo

Fried, Frank, Harris, Shriver & Jacobson trace its origins back to the turn of the twentieth century to Riegelman & Bach, Riegelman Hess & Strasser, and Strasser Spiegelberg Fried and Frank, which were predecessor firms. In 1971, the firm took its current form with name partners Walter Fried, Hans Frank, Sam Harris, Sargent Shriver and Leslie Jacobson.

Fried Frank has five offices. It opened a Washington, D.C. office in 1949. Fried Frank also opened a Los Angeles office in 1986, but closed it in 2005. In 1970, Fried Frank opened a London office. A Paris satellite office followed in 1993 and has since closed. It opened in Frankfurt in 2004. In December 2006, the firm opened its Hong Kong office, recruiting the greater China managing partner of Simmons & Simmons and other key partners. The firm officially launched a Shanghai office in October 2007. In January 2015, Fried Frank announced it was closing its offices in Hong Kong and Shanghai.

In 2002, Fried Frank engaged in merger talks with Ashurst Morris Crisp, which did not result in a transaction. Fried Frank later hired Ashurst's former managing partner, Justin Spendlove.

As of the fiscal year ended February 2020, the firm had a gross revenue of $776 million, up from $684.8 million the year before. Revenue per lawyer rose 8.2 percent, to $1.442 million, while its profits per partner jumped 16 percent, to $3.79 million.

In November 2023, amid a wave of antisemitic incidents at elite U.S. law schools, Fried, Frank, Harris, Shriver & Jacobson was one of a group of major law firms that sent a letter to top law school deans warning them that an escalation in incidents targeting Jewish students would have corporate hiring consequences. The letter said, "We look to you to ensure your students who hope to join our firms after graduation are prepared to be an active part of workplace communities that have zero tolerance policies for any form of discrimination or harassment, much less the kind that has been taking place on some law school campuses."

== Clients ==
In 2005, Fried Frank represented Tishman Speyer in its $1.7 billion acquisition of the MetLife Building at 200 Park Avenue in New York City. At the time, the deal set a record for the highest sale price of an office building in the United States. In September 2022, Fried Frank advised Goldman Sachs on the formation of its flagship corporate buyout fund, which closed with total commitments of $9.7 billion, making it Goldman's largest private equity fund since 2007.

In 2022, former FTX CTO Gary Wang hired Fried Frank to represent him in the federal probe into the cryptocurrency exchange FTX's collapse, in which Wang entered into a plea deal with the Office of the US Attorney for the Southern District of New York.

== Notable alumni ==
- Geoffrey Berman (born 1957)
- Michael R. Bromwich (born 1953)
- Douglas J. Feith (born 1953)
- Beth Labson Freeman (born 1953)
- Martin D. Ginsburg (1932–2010)
- Jason Greenblatt (born 1967)
- Graham Hearne (born 1937)
- Dale Ho (born 1977)
- Jonathan Kanter (born 1973)
- Kenneth Lipper (born 1941)
- Harel Locker (born 1965)
- Elena Kagan (born 1960)
- Max Kampelman (1920–2013)
- Arthur Lazarus Jr. (1926–2019)
- Natasha C. Merle (born 1983)
- Robert Mundheim (born 1933)
- Janai Nelson
- Harvey Pitt (1945-2023)
- Jed Rakoff (born 1943)
- Patricia Roberts Harris (1924–1985)
- Vanessa Ruiz (born 1950)
- Richard Sauber
- Richard Schifter (1923–2020)
- Michael H. Schill (born 1958)
- Sargent Shriver (1915–2011)
- Audrey Strauss (born 1947)
- Gintautas Šulija (born 1978)
- William Howard Taft IV (born 1945)
- David H. Urias (born 1967)
- W. Richard West Jr. (born 1943)
- Marc Zell (born 1953)

== See also ==
- List of largest law firms by profits per partner
