= Holding the Line =

2022 nonfiction book by Geoffrey Berman

- 2022 hardcover book jacket
- Author: Geoffrey Berman
- Subject: Autobiographies; U.S. government law; politics; district courts; corruption
- Genre: nonfiction
- Set in: Office of the United States Attorney for the Southern District of New York
- Publisher: Penguin
- Publication place: United States
- Media type: Print; e-book; audiobook
- Pages: 352 pages
- ISBN: 9780593300299 and 0593300297
- OCLC: 1338025853
- LC Class: KF373.B47
- Website: Official website

Holding the Line: Inside the Nation's Preeminent US Attorney's Office and Its Battle with the Trump Justice Department is a nonfiction book by former Manhattan U.S. Attorney Geoffrey Berman and published by Penguin Press on September 13, 2022. Berman was fired by President Trump. In the book, Berman discusses "a range of conflicts he encountered with the [U.S.] Department of Justice during his tenure leading the Southern District of New York." Hence, Berman chronicles the improprieties that were applied by the Trump administration to pressure his U.S. Attorney's office. The author also gives in-depth specifics about cases, which his office prosecuted, such as Michael Cohen; Chris Collins; Michael Avenatti, and Jeffrey Epstein.
