= Geoffrey Berman =

American lawyer (born 1959)

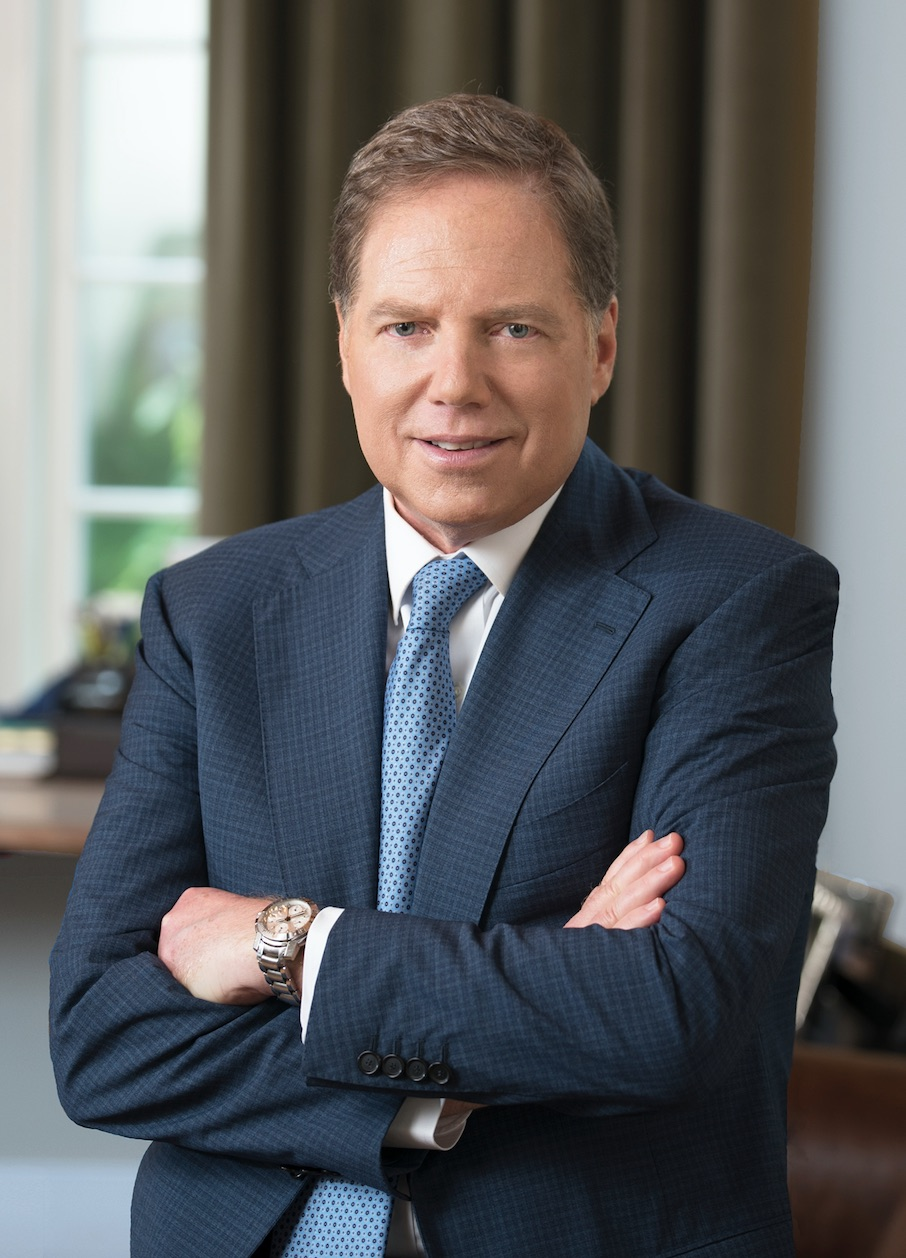
- Official portrait, 2018

United States Attorney for the Southern District of New York
- In office January 5, 2018 – June 20, 2020; Acting: January 5, 2018 – April 25, 2018
- President: Donald Trump
- Preceded by: Joon Kim (acting)
- Succeeded by: Audrey Strauss

Personal details
- Born: Geoffrey Steven Berman; September 12, 1959 (age 67) Trenton, New Jersey, U.S.
- Party: Republican
- Spouse: Joanne Schwartz
- Relatives: Michael J. Berman
- Education: University of Pennsylvania (BA, BS); Stanford University (JD)

Geoffrey Steven Berman (born September 12, 1959) is an American attorney who served as the United States Attorney for the Southern District of New York from 2018 to 2020. He is the Global Chair of the litigation department at the law firm Fried, Frank, Harris, Shriver & Jacobson.

Berman, a Republican, served as an Assistant United States Attorney for the Southern District of New York from 1990 to 1994. In January 2018, U.S. Attorney General Jeff Sessions announced Berman's appointment as interim U.S. Attorney for a statutory period of 120 days. On April 25, 2018, the judges of the Southern District of New York, pursuant to 28 U.S.C. § 546(d), unanimously appointed Berman U.S. Attorney for an indeterminate term that extended "until the vacancy is filled", which may or may not include the appointment of a presidential nominee approved by the Senate.

On June 19, 2020, Attorney General William Barr announced in a press release that Berman was "stepping down" effective July 3 and that Jay Clayton, the chairman of the U.S. Securities and Exchange Commission, would be nominated as his replacement. Hours later, Berman stated that he had not resigned and would not resign until "a presidentially appointed nominee is confirmed by the Senate." At the time that Trump and Barr sought his ouster, Berman was reportedly investigating Trump's personal attorney Rudy Giuliani for alleged crimes relating to his activities in Ukraine. On June 20, Barr told Berman that he had been fired by Trump at Barr's request and that the deputy U.S. Attorney Audrey Strauss would serve as acting U.S. Attorney. Berman then agreed to resign immediately.

== Early life ==
Geoffrey Steven Berman was born in Trenton, New Jersey, the son of Marie (Edelman) and Ronald Berman, a developer of Trenton real estate properties. He graduated magna cum laude from the University of Pennsylvania with a Bachelor of Arts degree in political science and a Bachelor of Science in economics from the Wharton School in 1981. He then studied law at Stanford Law School, where he obtained a Juris Doctor in 1984. During law school, he was the Note Editor of the Stanford Law Review.

== Career ==
Berman began his career as a clerk for Judge Leonard I. Garth of the United States Court of Appeals for the Third Circuit. From 1987 to 1990 he served as an associate to independent counsel Lawrence Walsh during the Iran–Contra affair investigation. There, he was part of a team that prosecuted former CIA employee Thomas G. Clines for tax fraud.

=== Assistant United States Attorney (1990–1994) ===
Berman served as an Assistant United States Attorney for the Southern District of New York from 1990 to 1994. He worked on several tax and fraud cases as a prosecutor, including the Masters of Deception computer hacking case. As a result of Berman’s prosecution of that case, his effigy was stabbed on the front cover of 2600: The Hacker Quarterly, a computer hacking magazine.

=== Private practice (1994–2018) ===
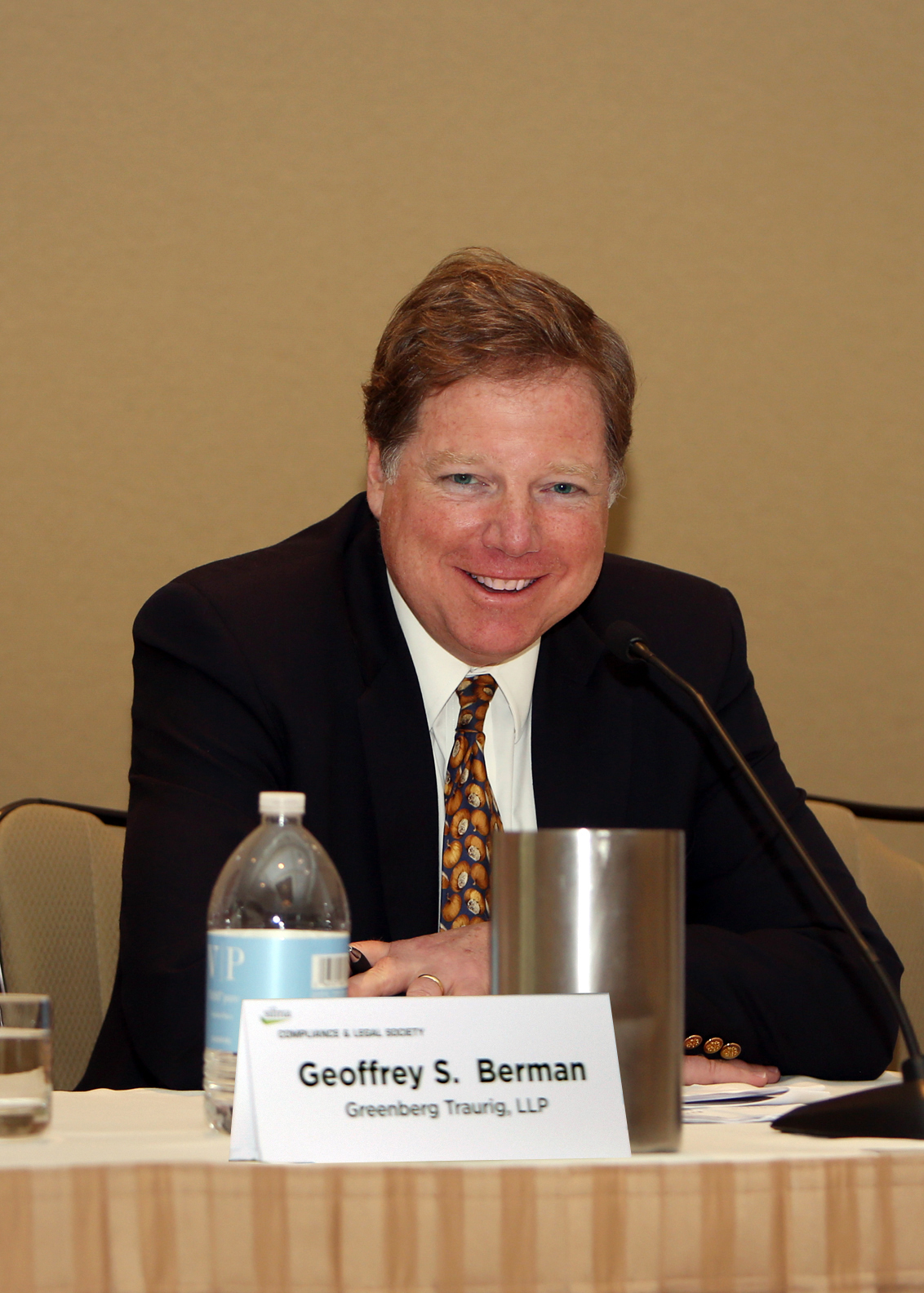
Berman during his time at Greenberg Traurig (2014)

Berman was subsequently engaged by Mudge Rose and Latham & Watkins, where he worked as a monitor to rid the New York Carpenter’s Union of the influence of organized crime. From 1994 to 1997, Berman represented, pro bono, Maureen and Richard Kanka, defending the constitutionality of Megan’s Law in state and federal litigation. He married Joanne Karen Schwartz on August 20, 1994.

Berman is a resident of New York, where he previously lived from 1984 to 2002. He then moved to Princeton, New Jersey, where he lived for 14 years. Berman was a shareholder at Greenberg Traurig, as was Rudy Giuliani. It was reported that Giuliani supported Berman for U.S. Attorney in New Jersey, but that Giuliani supported a different candidate for U.S. Attorney for the Southern District of New York.

Berman represented Philip Kwon, the deputy general counsel at the Port Authority of New York and New Jersey during the Bridgegate trial. He denied that Kwon was ever told the lane closures were intended to punish anyone.

=== United States Attorney (2018–2020) ===
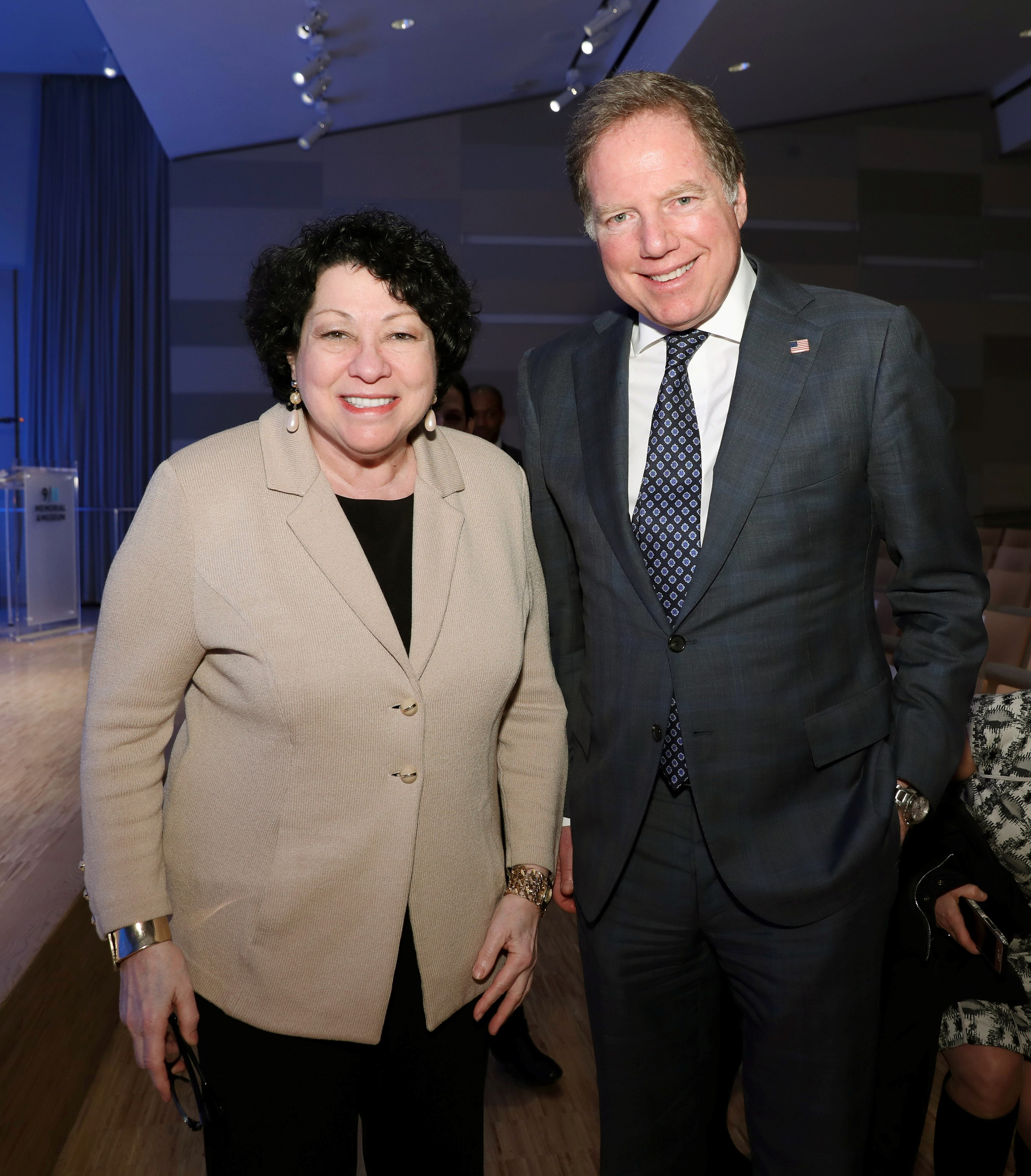
Berman with Associate Justice Sonia Sotomayor in March 2019

After President Donald Trump fired Preet Bharara as U.S. Attorney, Trump interviewed Berman for the position. Berman had performed some part-time volunteer work for the Trump transition. On January 3, 2018, Attorney General Jeff Sessions announced Berman's appointment as U.S. Attorney, along with 16 other former prosecutors to various offices around the country on an interim basis until the Senate could confirm them.

The Trump administration never nominated Berman or most of the other interim appointments. On April 25, 2018, the Chief Judge of the Southern District of New York entered an order on behalf of a unanimous court appointing Berman U.S. Attorney pursuant to its authority under 28 U.S.C Section 546(d). Berman had the appointment indefinitely, until the Senate confirmed someone nominated by the president. The U.S. Attorney's Office for the Southern District of New York, often called the "Sovereign District of New York", is known as highly independent. Berman oversaw investigations into some of Trump's associates.

In April 2018, Berman's office issued a search warrant of the office and hotel room of Michael Cohen, Trump's former lawyer, for possible bank fraud and campaign finance violations. Since Berman was recused by the U.S. Attorney General's Office from the investigation, he was apparently not involved in the decision to raid Cohen's office. That search was presumably conducted under the authority of Robert Khuzami, Berman's top deputy.

On August 8, 2018, U.S. Representative Chris Collins, his son Cameron, and the father of Cameron's fiancée, Stephen Zarsky, were arrested by the FBI and charged by Berman with insider trading and making false statements. Following the charges, House Speaker Paul Ryan kicked Collins off of the House Energy and Commerce Committee, and Collins suspended his reelection campaign. Collins subsequently pleaded guilty to insider trading and lying to the FBI and was sentenced to 26 months in prison.

On October 26, 2018, Berman charged Cesar Sayoc with sending a string of homemade incendiary packages to several present and former federal officials, including former President Barack Obama, former President Bill Clinton and former Secretary of State Hillary Clinton. Sayoc pleaded guilty and was sentenced to 20 years in prison.

In October 2018, Berman charged five doctors and one pharmacist with narcotics distribution, including prescribing opioids to individuals who had no medical need for them. Berman said at his press conference: “These doctors and other health professionals should have been the first line of defense against opioid abuse, but as alleged in today's charges, instead of caring for their patients, they were drug dealers in white coats." Five of the defendants have either pleaded guilty or been convicted.

In November 2018, Berman charged recording artist and performer Daniel Hernandez, better known as 6ix9ine, with six felony counts of racketeering and violence to aid racketeering. The most serious charge against Hernandez was "using or carrying a firearm during and in relation to, or possessing a firearm in furtherance of, a crime of violence, which was discharged", which can result in life in prison. In January 2019 Hernandez pleaded guilty to the charges. He was sentenced to two years in prison.

On November 26, 2018, Berman announced the indictment of former Honduran Congressman Tony Hernández on drug trafficking and weapons charges. Hernández is the brother of former Honduras President Juan Orlando Hernández. On October 18, 2019, Tony Hernández was convicted at trial.

On January 8, 2019, Berman charged Natalia Veselnitskaya, a Russian lawyer, with obstruction of justice in connection with a false and misleading declaration she submitted to a judge in the Southern District of New York. Berman said on announcing the indictment: "Fabricating evidence to affect the outcome of pending litigation not only undermines the integrity of the judicial process, but it threatens the ability of our courts and our government to ensure that justice is done."

On March 25, 2019, Berman charged Michael Avenatti with extortion in connection with his threat to Nike that he would go public with damaging allegations against Nike employees unless Nike paid him over $20 million. Berman said on announcing the charges: "A suit and tie doesn't mask the fact that, at its core, this was an old-fashioned shakedown." Avenatti was convicted on all counts on February 14, 2020.

In April 2019, Berman brought the first ever drug trafficking charges against a pharmaceutical company and two of its executives, charging Rochester Drug Co-Operative and its former CEO, Laurence Doud III, with conspiring to distribute oxycodone and fentanyl and to defraud the DEA. In announcing the charges, Berman said, "This prosecution is the first of its kind: executives of a pharmaceutical distributor and the distributor itself have been charged with drug trafficking, trafficking the same drugs that are fueling the opioid epidemic that is ravaging our country. Our Office will do everything in its power to combat this epidemic, from street-level dealers to the executives who illegally distribute drugs from their boardrooms."

In May 2019, Berman charged Avenatti with another indictment, alleging that he stole $300,000 from his client Stormy Daniels. Berman said: "Far from zealously representing his client, Avenatti, as alleged, instead engaged in outright deception and theft, victimizing rather than advocating for his client."

In July 2019, Berman charged financier Jeffrey Epstein with sex trafficking of minors and conspiracy to commit sex trafficking of minors. Berman said at his press conference: "The alleged behavior shocks the conscience. And while the charged conduct is from a number of years ago, it is still profoundly important to the many alleged victims, now young women. They deserve their day in court, and we are proud to stand up for them in bringing this indictment." Berman's prosecution resurfaced then-Labor Secretary Alexander Acosta's handling of Epstein's sex trafficking case a decade earlier. On July 12, Acosta resigned amid pressure from the case.

On August 10, 2019, Epstein was found dead in his cell of an apparent suicide. Berman stated: "Today's events are disturbing, and we are deeply aware of their potential to present yet another hurdle to giving Epstein's many victims their day in Court. To those brave young women who have already come forward and to the many others who have yet to do so, let me reiterate that we remain committed to standing for you, and our investigation of the conduct charged in the Indictment—which included a conspiracy count—remains ongoing."

On October 9, 2019, Berman announced charges against Lev Parnas, Igor Fruman and two others for campaign violations relating to the illegal use of straw donors and foreign money. Berman said: "They sought political influence not only to advance their own financial interests but to advance the political interests of at least one foreign official—a Ukrainian government official who sought the dismissal of the U.S. Ambassador to Ukraine". Berman said the investigation was ongoing.

On October 15, 2019, Berman announced the indictment of Halkbank, the largest state-owned bank in Turkey, for a multi-billion-dollar scheme to evade U.S. sanctions on Iran. In announcing the charges, Berman said: "The bank's audacious conduct was supported and protected by high-ranking Turkish government officials, some of whom received millions of dollars in bribes to promote and protect the scheme." Turkish President Recep Tayyip Erdogan lobbied President Trump to quash Berman's investigation, as Erdogan's family and allies could be implicated by it. In June 2019, Attorney General Barr pressed Berman to allow Halkbank to pay a fine and acknowledge some wrongdoing, and to end criminal investigations into senior Halkbank officials involved in the sanctions evasion. Previously, acting Attorney General Matthew G. Whitaker rejected Berman's request to file criminal charges against the bank. Whitaker did so shortly after Erdogan had pressed Trump to quash the investigation.

On November 19, 2019, Berman charged guards Michael Thomas and Tova Noel with creating false records, and with conspiracy, after video footage obtained by prosecutors revealed that Jeffrey Epstein had, against regulation, been in his cell unchecked for eight hours before being found dead on August 10, 2019.

On January 27, 2020, at a press conference sponsored by Safe Horizon at the site of Jeffrey Epstein's New York mansion, Berman was asked whether Prince Andrew was cooperating with the SDNY's investigation into Epstein's coconspirators. Berman responded that to date Andrew had provided "zero cooperation". On March 9, 2020, Berman said that Andrew had "completely shut the door" on voluntary cooperation and that his office was considering its options.

On February 11, 2020, Berman announced charges against Lawrence Ray, who sex trafficked and extorted his daughter's college roommates. Berman said: "For so many of us, and our children, college is supposed to be a time of self-discovery and newfound independence, a chance to explore and learn, all within the safety of a college community. But as alleged, the defendant exploited that vulnerable time in his victims' lives".

On February 25, 2020, it was reported and confirmed by an SDNY spokesperson that a search warrant was executed at the Manhattan offices of Peter Nygård amid a sex-trafficking investigation.

On March 9, 2020, Berman announced the indictment of 27 people, including Jason Servis and Jorge Navarro, involved in doping racehorses across the country. Berman said, "The defendants who we charge today engaged in this conduct not for love of the sport and certainly not out of concern for the horses, but for money."

On March 26, 2020, Berman announced the indictment of Venezuelan President Nicolás Maduro and other Venezuelan officials on charges of conspiracy to commit narco-terrorism and to import hundreds of tons of cocaine into the United States and related weapons offenses. Berman said: "As alleged, Maduro and the other defendants expressly intended to flood the United States with cocaine in order to undermine the health and well being of our nation. Maduro very deliberately deployed cocaine as a weapon."

On April 30, 2020, Berman announced drug trafficking and weapons charges against Juan Carlos "The Tiger" Bonillo, the former head of the Honduras National Police. Berman stated that the indictment alleged that Bonillo conspired with convicted former Honduran congressman Tony Hernández and his brother, former Honduras President Juan Orlando Hernández.

On April 30, 2020, Berman announced a deferred prosecution agreement against Bank Hapoalim, Israel's largest bank, for conspiring to hide assets and income in offshore accounts. Bank Hapoalim agreed to pay nearly $875 million. Berman said, "Israel's largest bank, Bank Hapoalim, and its Swiss subsidiary have admitted not only failing to prevent but actively assisting U.S. customers to set up secret accounts, to shelter assets and income, and to evade taxes. The combined payment approaching $1 billion reflects the magnitude of the tax evasion by the Bank's U.S. customers, the size of the fees the Bank collected to provide this illegal service, and the gravity of the illegal conduct."

On June 12, 2020, Berman announced the unsealing of a complaint against Inigo Philbrick, an art dealer with galleries in London and Miami, charged with defrauding a client of over $20 million. Berman said: "You can't sell more than 100 percent ownership in a single piece of art, which Philbrick allegedly did, among other scams. When his schemes began to unravel, Philbrick allegedly fled the country. Now he is in U.S custody and facing justice."

=== 2020 ouster ===
In June 2020, CNN reported that Trump had been thinking about removing Berman from his position for two years. Under Berman, the SDNY investigated and prosecuted Trump's longtime personal attorney and "fixer" Michael Cohen in 2018. Trump also felt Berman's investigation of his personal attorney, Rudy Giuliani, was an effort to damage him politically. That investigation of Giuliani's activities in Ukraine became publicly known in October 2019, and later was reported to include a broad range of potential crimes by Giuliani or his associates. In May 2021, the SDNY publicly disclosed in a court filing that in November 2019 it covertly obtained search warrants for Giuliani's iCloud account, and for that of his and Trump's associate, Victoria Toensing, as part of the investigation. In June 2020, the SDNY was also two months from indicting former Trump advisor Steve Bannon on fraud charges relating to fundraising for the Mexico–United States border wall.

In a late-night news release on June 19, 2020, Attorney General William Barr announced that Berman would step down from his position. He said that Trump intended to nominate Jay Clayton, the chairman of the Securities and Exchange Commission, to take Berman's place as the Manhattan U.S. attorney, and that Trump, on his recommendation, had appointed Craig Carpenito, the U.S. attorney for the District of New Jersey, to serve as the acting U.S. attorney for the Southern District of New York, effective July 3, 2020, while the Senate takes up Clayton's nomination.

Shortly after Barr's announcement, Berman denied having resigned and said that he had "no intention of resigning", saying that he was appointed by a court, not the president, and that he would remain in office until the Senate confirmed a replacement. He added that he learned about his supposed intention to step down from press reports. He vowed to ensure that the office's "important cases continue unimpeded". Because Berman was appointed by the United States District Court for the Southern District of New York under 28 U.S.C. Section 546(d), it was unclear whether either the Attorney General or the President could remove Berman as US Attorney without a Senate-confirmed successor in place. It was also unclear whether Carpenito is legally eligible to replace Berman on an acting basis.

The next day, June 20, Barr claimed that Trump had fired Berman, writing in a letter to Berman, "Because you have declared that you have no intention of resigning, I have asked the President to remove you as of today, and he has done so." Barr wrote in his letter, "Unfortunately, with your statement of last night, you have chosen public spectacle over public service". Barr added "By operation of law, the Deputy United States Attorney, Audrey Strauss, will become the Acting United States Attorney." When asked by reporters, Trump said, "That's his [Barr's] department, not mine. ... I'm not involved." Later that day Berman agreed to step down because, he said, Barr had respected "the normal operation of law" by appointing his deputy as interim U.S. attorney. Barr also wrote to Berman, "Your statement also wrongly implies that your continued tenure in the office is necessary to ensure that cases now pending in the Southern District of New York are handled appropriately. This is obviously false."

Senate Minority Leader Chuck Schumer of New York said the firing "reeks of potential corruption of the legal process". Schumer said on the Senate floor, "But for Mr. Berman’s principled stand, the White House and the DOJ would have subverted the chain of succession at the SDNY to install a pliant U.S. Attorney from New Jersey in Mr. Berman's place. Thankfully, due to Mr. Berman's courage that plan was thwarted". On June 20, 2020, House Judiciary Committee chair Jerry Nadler announced that the committee would "immediately open an investigation into this incident, as part of our broader investigation into Barr's unacceptable politicization of the Department of Justice" and invited Berman to join two whistleblowers at an upcoming hearing about "a larger, ongoing, and wholly unacceptable pattern of conduct". Speaker of the House Nancy Pelosi said that Berman's firing "cannot be explained by cause and instead suggests base and improper motives. ... Judiciary Chairman Nadler's renewed call for Barr to testify before the House Judiciary Committee and the Committee's decision to open an immediate investigation into this incident are justified and urgently needed".

On July 9, Berman testified before a closed session of the House Judiciary Committee. After his testimony was released, Representative Adam Schiff said, "Berman's act of defiance" was a story "of great heroism".

On August 20, 2020, the SDNY announced the indictment of Steve Bannon, Trump's former campaign CEO, on wire fraud and money laundering charges. The charges were based on his taking for his personal use funds that were supposed to be dedicated to the building of a wall on the southern border. Several articles questioned whether the charges would have been brought if Berman had not blocked Barr's attempt to appoint an ally to replace him. On January 20, 2021, Trump granted Bannon a pardon from the federal charges. Berman refused to resign until his deputy was named to succeed him, which he said would ensure that the important cases of his office would continue without delay or interruption.

On July 15, 2020, Stanford Law School announced Berman's appointment as the Edwin A. Heafey Jr. Visiting professor of Law for the fall 2020 term.

On November 19, 2021, at Damian Williams's investiture ceremony as the new U.S. Attorney for the SDNY, Williams praised Berman's service. As reported by the Associated Press, Williams "sparked sustained applause when he mentioned Geoffrey S. Berman, a Republican who served as U.S. attorney during much of Donald Trump’s presidential term. Berman became known in what prosecutors like to affectionately call the 'Sovereign District of New York' for standing up to Washington's demands and left office in June 2020 after a standoff with then-Attorney General William Barr over investigations into Trump's allies. Williams said Berman promoted him and 'when the hour demanded true courage and independence and a demonstration of what it means to be a Southern District of New York prosecutor, he showed all of America what that means'".

=== Return to private life ===
In December 2020, Fried, Frank, Harris, Shriver & Jacobson announced that Berman was joining the firm to head its white-collar defense, regulatory enforcement and investigations practice.

In September 2022, Berman published a memoir, Holding the Line: Inside the Nation's Preeminent US Attorney's Office and its Battle with the Trump Justice Department. In it he describes numerous instances in which he says the Justice Department took politically motivated actions, such as suppressing investigations into Trump's allies or demanding investigations into people considered Trump's enemies. As one example, he says that in September 2018 a senior Justice Department official told Berman's deputy that because the Southern District had pursued prosecution of two Trump loyalists, the office should issue charges against a prominent Democratic lawyer "to even things out", and should do so before Election Day. The Senate Judiciary Committee announced plans to investigate Berman's allegations that the Justice Department during the Trump administration made politically influenced decisions to initiate criminal investigations against some people and block them against others.

== Notable civil cases and criminal prosecutions announced by Berman ==
- U.S. v Rafatnejad et al.
- U.S. v New York City Housing Authority
- U.S. v Christian Toro and Tyler Toro
- U.S. v Freedman et al.
- U.S. v Therese Okoumou
- U.S. v MTA et al.
- U.S. v City of Mount Vernon
- U.S. v Collins et al.
- U.S. v Hernandez et al.
- U.S. v Cesar Altieri Sayoc
- U.S. v Natalya Vladmirovna Veselnitskaya
- U.S. v Michael Avenatti
- U.S. v Rochester Drug Co-operative
- U.S. v Doud
- U.S. v Michael Avenatti
- U.S. v Jeffrey Epstein
- U.S. v Juan Antonio Hernández
- U.S. v Lev Parnas and Igor Fruman
- U.S. v Halkbank
- U.S. v Tova Noel and Michael Thomas
- U.S. v Lawrence Ray
- U.S. v Jorge Navarro, Jason Servis et al.
- U.S. v Nicolás Maduro et al.
- U.S. v Juan Carlos Bonillo
- U.S. v Bank Hapoalim
- U.S. v Muge Ma
- U.S. v William Sadleir
- U.S v Inigo Philbrick

== Works ==
- Holding the Line: Inside the Nation's Preeminent US Attorney's Office and Its Battle with the Trump Justice Department. Penguin. September 13, 2022. ISBN 978-0-593-30030-5. OCLC 1338025853.

== See also ==
- List of Jewish American jurists

Legal offices
Preceded by Joon Kim; Acting	United States Attorney for the Southern District of New York; 2018–2020	Succeeded by Audrey Strauss; Acting
