= Judge Noonan =

Judge Noonan

- Gregory Francis Noonan (1906–1964), judge of the United States District Court for the Southern District of New York
- John T. Noonan Jr. (1926–2017), judge of the United States Court of Appeals for the Ninth Circuit
