= Audrey Strauss =

American attorney (born 1947)

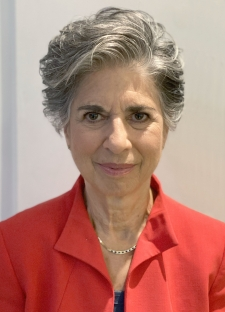

United States Attorney for the Southern District of New York
- In office June 20, 2020 – October 10, 2021
- President: Donald Trump; Joe Biden
- Preceded by: Geoffrey Berman
- Succeeded by: Damian Williams

Personal details
- Born: October 7, 1947 (age 79) Philadelphia, Pennsylvania, U.S.
- Party: Democratic
- Spouse: John Wing
- Children: 4
- Education: Barnard College (BA), Columbia University (JD)
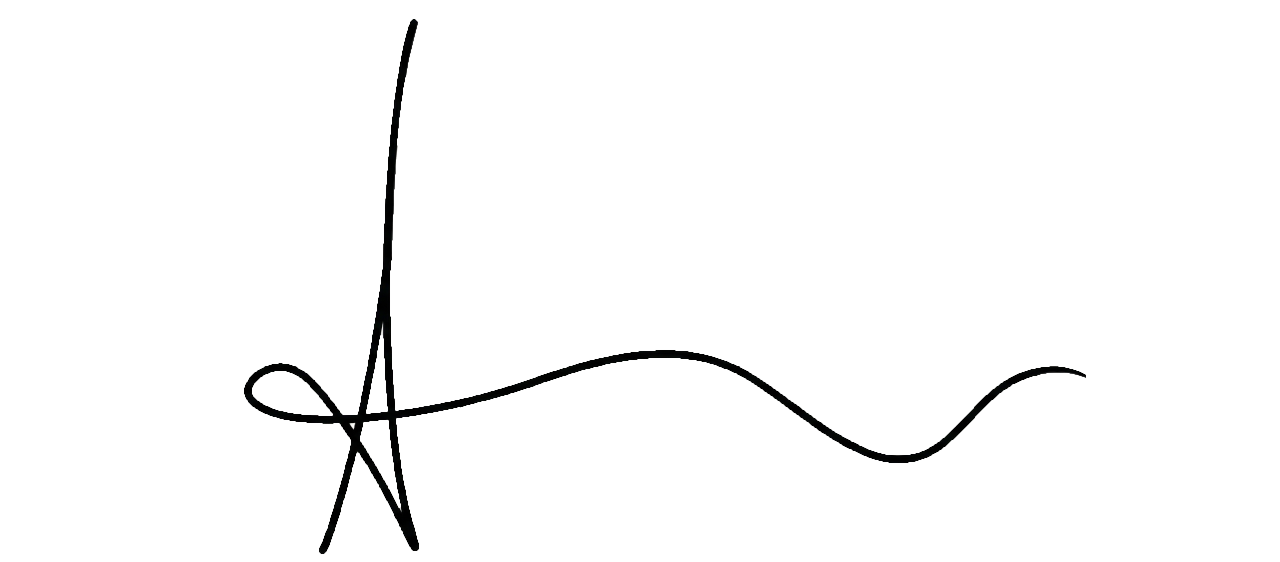
- Signature

Audrey Strauss (born October 7, 1947) is an American attorney who served as the United States Attorney for the Southern District of New York from June 20, 2020, to October 10, 2021. Previously the deputy U.S. Attorney, Strauss became the acting U.S. Attorney after the previous U.S. attorney, Geoffrey Berman, was fired by President Donald Trump at the request of Attorney General William Barr. On December 22, 2020, the U.S. District Court for the Southern District of New York, effective January 16, 2021, and pursuant to 28 U.S.C. § 546(d), unanimously appointed Strauss as U.S. Attorney for an indeterminate term.

== Early life and education ==
Strauss was born and raised in Philadelphia, Pennsylvania, the daughter of Russian immigrants. She has one brother, a retired NASA doctor. Her parents died when she was young, after which she and her brother were raised by family friends. She moved to New York City to attend Barnard College at the age of 16, receiving a Bachelor of Arts degree and graduating cum laude four years later. She then earned a Juris Doctor from Columbia Law School, where she was a Harlan Fiske Stone Scholar and James Kent Scholar.

== Career ==
After graduating from law school, she clerked for then-U.S. District Judge Lawrence Pierce. From 1976 to 1983, Strauss served as an Assistant United States Attorney at the Southern District of New York. During her time there, she served on the staff of the independent counsel investigating the Iran–Contra affair. She also successfully argued against attorney Roy Cohn in his attempt to overturn convictions of two Gambino family Mafia members. She served as Chief of Appeals in the Criminal Division and as Chief of the Securities and Commodities Fraud Unit.

After leaving the Southern District, she worked in private practice for 30 years, primarily as a defense attorney in white-collar cases. Strauss became a litigation partner at Fried, Frank, Harris, Shriver & Jacobson, then at Mudge Rose Guthrie Alexander & Ferdon. She later served as General Counsel of Alcoa, an industrial corporation based in Pittsburgh, Pennsylvania. She has been a guest lecturer at Brooklyn Law School, the Fordham University School of Law, and Harvard Law School, teaching courses in trial advocacy. She has also served as a board member of The Innocence Project.

Strauss returned to the Southern District of New York in 2018, serving as Deputy U.S. Attorney under Geoffrey Berman. During her tenure as Deputy U.S. Attorney, Strauss worked on cases against Michael Cohen, Chris Collins, and Rudy Giuliani associates Igor Fruman and Lev Parnas.

Late in the night of June 19, 2020, Attorney General William Barr announced that Berman had stepped down from his position as U.S. Attorney for the Southern District and was being replaced by SEC chairman Jay Clayton. In response, Berman released a statement saying he learned of this only from news reports and that he had not resigned and would not, claiming that, as he had been nominated by a committee of judges on the United States District Court for the Southern District of New York, he would not leave his position until a successor was confirmed by the U.S. Senate. On June 20, Barr stated that the President had fired Berman, adding, "By operation of law, the Deputy United States Attorney, Audrey Strauss, will become the Acting United States Attorney," serving until a nominee is confirmed by the Senate. Berman then agreed to step down.

On January 14, 2021, Strauss announced a $180 million fine on Toyota for violating the Clean Air Act. She also won the 2021 trial of Ghislaine Maxwell.

Strauss served until October 2021, when she was replaced by Damian Williams.

== Personal life ==
Strauss is married to John "Rusty" Wing, a defense attorney. The couple have four children. Strauss is a registered Democrat.

Her son, Mathew Wing, was married to Melissa DeRosa, who was secretary to the governor of the State of New York, Andrew Cuomo until August 2021.

Legal offices
Preceded by Geoffrey Berman	United States Attorney for the Southern District of New York; 2020–2021	Succeeded by Damian Williams
