= John T. Cahill (lawyer) =

American lawyer (1903–1966)

United States Attorney for the Southern District of New York
- In office 1939 – March 1941
- President: Franklin D. Roosevelt
- Preceded by: Gregory F. Noonan
- Succeeded by: Mathias F. Correa

Personal details
- Born: November 17, 1903 New York City, New York, U.S.
- Died: November 3, 1966 (aged 62) London, United Kingdom
- Spouse: Grace Pickens
- Children: Catherine Cahill Bernhard
- Education: Columbia University (A.B.); Harvard Law School (LL.B.)

John Thomas Cahill (November 17, 1903 – November 3, 1966), was a 20th-century American lawyer and prosecutor.

== Biography ==
Cahill was the son of a New York City Police Officer who had immigrated from Ireland. He attended Townsend Harris High School, a public school in New York and later attended Columbia University, A.B. (1924) and Harvard Law School, LL.B. (1927).

He joined the law firm of Cotton & Franklin, the predecessor to the firm that was to later bear his name, Cahill Gordon & Reindel. He represented NBC, RCA, W.R. Grace & Co. and A&P, among other corporate giants.

Cahill served as United States Attorney for the Southern District of New York, from 1939 to 1941 and was the lead prosecutor in the trial of former United States Circuit Judge Martin T. Manton, which led to Manton's conviction.

== Personal life ==
He was married to Grace Pickens who was one of the Pickens Sisters, a singing trio born on a Georgia plantation that reached national stardom in the 1930s with its own radio show, concert tours and records. They had 4 children. His daughter Catherine married William Lehman Bernhard (b. 1931), son of Dorothy Lehman Bernhard.
