= Charles F. McLaughlin =

American judge (1887–1976)

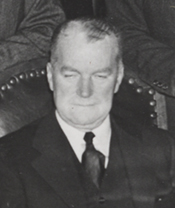

Senior Judge of the United States District Court for the District of Columbia
- In office December 31, 1964 – February 5, 1976

Judge of the United States District Court for the District of Columbia
- In office October 21, 1949 – December 31, 1964
- Appointed by: Harry S. Truman
- Preceded by: Seat established by 63 Stat. 493
- Succeeded by: Howard Francis Corcoran

Member of the U.S. House of Representatives from Nebraska's 2nd district
- In office January 3, 1935 – January 3, 1943
- Preceded by: Edward R. Burke
- Succeeded by: Howard Buffett

Personal details
- Born: Charles Francis McLaughlin; June 19, 1887 Lincoln, Nebraska, U.S.
- Died: February 5, 1976 (aged 88) Washington, D.C., U.S.
- Resting place: Gate of Heaven Cemetery; Silver Spring, Maryland
- Party: Democratic
- Education: University of Nebraska (A.B.); Columbia Law School (LL.B.)

Charles Francis McLaughlin (June 19, 1887 – February 5, 1976) was an American politician and judge who was a U.S. representative from Nebraska from 1935 to 1943 and a district judge of the United States District Court for the District of Columbia.

== Education and career ==
Born in Lincoln, Lancaster County, Nebraska, McLaughlin attended the public schools and then received an Artium Baccalaureus degree from the University of Nebraska in 1908. While at Nebraska he joined the Phi Delta Theta fraternity. He received a Bachelor of Laws from Columbia Law School in 1910 and was admitted to the bar the same year.

He was in private practice of law in Omaha, Nebraska from 1910 to 1935. He was a Special Master in Chancery for the United States District Court for the District of Nebraska from 1916 to 1918.

McLaughlin was in the United States Army American Expeditionary Forces from 1918 to 1919, during the World War I, serving as Captain of the 347th Field Artillery of the 91st Division, and was discharged on April 30, 1919. He was a Major in the Officers Reserve Corps of the United States Army Reserve from 1919 to 1921.

He was a delegate to the Nebraska state constitutional convention in 1920. He was a United States representative from Nebraska from 1935 to 1943. He was a member of the American-Mexican Claims Commission from 1943 to 1947. He was a member of the Indian Claims Commission from April 5, 1947, to November 14, 1949.

== Congressional service ==
McLaughlin was elected as a Democrat to the 74th United States Congress and to the three succeeding Congresses and served from January 3, 1935, to January 3, 1943. He was an unsuccessful candidate for reelection in 1942 to the 78th United States Congress.

== Federal judicial service ==
McLaughlin received a recess appointment from President Harry S. Truman on October 21, 1949, to the United States District Court for the District of Columbia, to a new seat created by 63 Stat. 493, taking his oath and commencing service on November 15, 1949. He was nominated to the same seat by President Truman on January 5, 1950. He was confirmed by the United States Senate on February 27, 1950, and received his commission on March 1, 1950. He assumed senior status on December 31, 1964. He assumed inactive senior status in June 1974. His service was terminated on February 5, 1976, due to his death in Washington, D.C., where he resided. He was interred in the Gate of Heaven Cemetery in Silver Spring, Maryland.

== Sources ==
1. "McLaughlin, Charles Francis". The Political Graveyard.
2. "McLaughlin, Charles Francis". Biographical Directory of the United States Congress.

U.S. House of Representatives
Preceded by Edward R. Burke (D)	Member of the U.S. House of Representatives from Nebraska's 2nd congressional district 1935–1943	Succeeded by Howard Buffett (R)
Legal offices
Preceded by Seat established by 63 Stat. 493	Judge of the United States District Court for the District of Columbia; 1949–1964	Succeeded by Howard Francis Corcoran
