= Marvin E. Frankel =

US federal judge (1920–2002)

Judge of the United States District Court for the Southern District of New York
- In office October 21, 1965 – September 30, 1978
- Appointed by: Lyndon B. Johnson
- Preceded by: Gregory Francis Noonan
- Succeeded by: Abraham David Sofaer

Personal details
- Born: July 26, 1920 New York City, New York, U.S.
- Died: March 3, 2002 (aged 81) New York City, New York, U.S.
- Education: Queens College (BA); Columbia University (LLB)

Marvin Earle Frankel (July 26, 1920 – March 3, 2002) was an American lawyer who served as a United States district judge of the United States District Court for the Southern District of New York. He was also a professor at Columbia Law School and a legal scholar whose views helped to establish sentencing guidelines for the federal courts.

== Education and career ==
Born in New York City and raised in Newark, New Jersey, Frankel graduated from Weequahic High School in 1937, at the age of 16. He served in the United States Army during World War II from 1942 to 1946, where he became a staff sergeant in the supply corps. While in the army, he deployed to Africa. He received an Artium Baccalaureus degree from Queens College in 1943. His service was followed by a Bachelor of Laws from Columbia Law School in 1948. He also served as the editor-in-chief of the Columbia Law Review, and was thereafter an associate in law at Columbia Law School from 1948 to 1949. He was an assistant to the Solicitor General of the United States from 1949 to 1956, thereafter entering private practice in New York City from 1956 to 1962. He was a professor at Columbia Law School from 1962 to 1965.

=== Federal judicial service ===
On September 2, 1965, Frankel was nominated by President Lyndon B. Johnson to a seat on the United States District Court for the Southern District of New York vacated by Gregory Francis Noonan. Frankel was confirmed by the United States Senate on October 21, 1965, and received his commission the same day. Frankel resigned from the bench on September 30, 1978.

=== Post judicial service ===
After resigning from the federal bench, Frankel returned to private practice in New York City. He worked at the law firm Kramer Levin Naftalis & Frankel LLP from 1983 until his death on March 3, 2002, in New York City.

== Controversy ==
Despite being a pioneer of United States Sentencing Guidelines, Frankel in 1976 sentenced Bernard Bergman, a wealthy, philanthropic and albeit non-violent and non-dangerous rabbi, to only 4 months in prison despite a statutory maximum of 8 years. Rabbi Bergman plead guilty to 2 of 11 counts, including defrauding his nursing homes of their Medicaid funds of 2.5 million dollars. Frankel argued in his opinion that courts will not lessen sentencing because of past philanthropic/religious work, just as they would not aggravate sentence for a defendant's notoriety, but prosecutors attacked the sentence as lenient.

== Legacy ==
Over a career of more than 50 years, Frankel traveled widely campaigning for human rights and as an advocate before the Supreme Court. He helped draft the brief for The New York Times in the First Amendment case, New York Times v. Sullivan, which set limits on libel suits brought by public figures. He was a founder of the Lawyers Committee for Human Rights (now renamed Human Rights First) and served as its chairman for many years.

In 1977, Frankel imposed a $5,000 fine and ten-month sentence on the former Mississippi Republican gubernatorial nominee Rubel Phillips, subsequently an officer in the Stirling Homex Corporation, which manufactured housing modules and sought to locate a plant in Harrison County, Mississippi. The New York-based firm went bankrupt in 1972. Phillips and four other company officers were indicted and tried on charges of conspiracy and fraud in the sale of $40 million worth of stock. Four of the officers, including Phillips, were found guilty of having falsely inflated earnings reports and having deceived investors, auditors, and the United States Securities and Exchange Commission. In 1978, the United States Supreme Court declined to hear appeals by the defendants and left intact their fines and sentences imposed by Judge Frankel.

Frankel's short 1973 book, Criminal Sentences: Law Without Order, exercised a principal influence on the sentencing reform movement that had a significant influence on American sentencing law in the late 20th century. Drawing on his experiences as a federal judge, Frankel argued that unrestrained sentencing discretion on the part of individual judges, a legacy of progressive penal policy that emphasized the rehabilitation of individual offenders and tailored sentences more to the character of the offender than the seriousness of the offense, resulted in arbitrary sentences and wide disparity between the sentences imposed on similar defendants for similar crimes. His graceful writing style, memorable anecdotes, and palpable sense of outrage made the book accessible to a wide policy-making public, and pushed his proposal for sentencing commissions empowered to create binding sentencing guidelines to restrain judicial discretion to the forefront of the criminal reform agenda of the 1970s and 1980s. Sentencing commissions and guidelines were created in a number of states, and most controversially in the federal Sentencing Reform Act of 1984. The federal sentencing guidelines were widely criticized as an unnecessarily rigid and extreme version of Frankel's idea. In 2005, in the case of United States v. Booker, the United States Supreme Court declared the Sentencing Reform Act unconstitutional insofar as it made the guidelines mandatory. The guidelines remain influential in federal sentencing, however, and Frankel's ideas continue to influence sentencing reform in the United States and in other countries.

Frankel's papers from 1963 to 2002 are housed in the Special Collections of Lloyd Sealy Library, John Jay College of Criminal Justice. His archived papers include correspondence, writings, speeches, legal documents, opinion books, media and ephemera documenting his career.

== Selected publications ==
- The Grand Jury: An Institution on Trial
- Sentencing: Helping Judges Do Their Jobs
- The Search for Truth: An Umpireal View, 123 U. Pa. L. Rev. 1031 (1975)
- Criminal Sentences: Law Without Order
- Faith and Freedom: Religious Liberty in America (Hill and Wang 1994)

== See also ==
- List of Jewish American jurists

Legal offices
Preceded by Gregory Francis Noonan	Judge of the United States District Court for the Southern District of New York; 1965–1978	Succeeded by Abraham David Sofaer
