= Henry H. Kennedy Jr. =

American judge (born 1948)

Henry Harold Kennedy Jr.
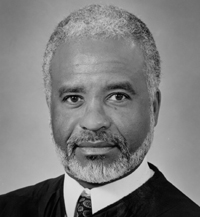

Senior Judge of the United States District Court for the District of Columbia
- Incumbent
- Assumed office November 18, 2011

Judge of the United States District Court for the District of Columbia
- In office September 18, 1997 – November 18, 2011
- Appointed by: Bill Clinton
- Preceded by: Joyce Hens Green
- Succeeded by: Ketanji Brown Jackson

Associate Judge of the Superior Court of the District of Columbia
- In office 1979–1997
- Appointed by: Jimmy Carter
- Preceded by: Joyce Hens Green
- Succeeded by: Melvin R. Wright

Magistrate Judge of the United States District Court for the District of Columbia
- In office 1976–1979

Personal details
- Born: Henry Harold Kennedy Jr. February 22, 1948 (age 78) Columbia, South Carolina, U.S.
- Education: Princeton University (BA); Harvard University (JD)

Henry Harold Kennedy Jr. (born February 22, 1948) is an inactive senior United States district judge of the United States District Court for the District of Columbia.

== Education and career ==
Born in Columbia, South Carolina, Kennedy graduated with a Bachelor of Arts from the Princeton School of Public and International Affairs (then the Woodrow Wilson School of Public and International Affairs) in 1970 after completing a senior thesis titled "Black Politics in Indiana, 1888–1900." He later received a J.D. from Harvard Law School in 1973. Following graduation, he worked for the law firm of Reavis, Pogue, Neal and Rose in Washington, D.C. Subsequent to this he was an Assistant United States Attorney for the District of Columbia between 1973 and 1976. He served as a United States Magistrate of the United States District Court for the District of Columbia between 1976 and 1979. He was appointed Associate Judge of the Superior Court of the District of Columbia in December 1979 where he served until he was appointed as a federal judge in September 1997.

== Federal judicial service ==
On May 15, 1997, Kennedy was nominated by President Bill Clinton to a seat on the United States District Court for the District of Columbia vacated by Joyce Hens Green. Kennedy was confirmed by the United States Senate on September 4, 1997, and received his commission on September 18, 1997. He took senior status on November 18, 2011, due to a certified disability and is currently in inactive senior status.

== Notable cases ==
- In November 2007, Kennedy ordered the Bush White House to preserve its emails.
- On January 9, 2008, Kennedy rejected a request from terror suspects held at Guantanamo Bay seeking a court hearing into the destruction of interrogation tapes by the CIA in 2005.
- On August 16, 2010, Kennedy ruled that Guantanamo Bay detainee Adnan Farhan Abd Al Latif could not be held by the U.S. government. Kennedy found that the government's key piece of evidence, a heavily redacted intelligence report, was not sufficiently reliable to justify Latif's detention. The D.C. Circuit later reversed this ruling, holding that Kennedy should have accorded a presumption of regularity to the report. Commentators have criticized the D.C. Circuit's reversal of Kennedy's reliability holding.
- On June 24, 2011, Kennedy issued a ruling addressing the role of the U.S. Constitution's Speech or Debate Clause in federal legislative branch employment lawsuits. He held that the Speech or Debate Clause barred discrimination and retaliation claims that could not be proven without inquiry into internal legislative branch communications, but held that such claims could go forward if the supposedly protected legislative explanation for the challenged employment action could be shown to be pretextual without inquiry into protected legislative activity.

== See also ==
- List of African-American federal judges
- List of African-American jurists

Legal offices
Preceded by Joyce Hens Green	Judge of the United States District Court for the District of Columbia; 1997–2011	Succeeded by Ketanji Brown Jackson
