= Richard Athil Udall =

American politician (1811–1883)

Member of the New York State Assembly from the Suffolk County district
- In office 1866–1867
- Preceded by: Henry C. Platt
- Succeeded by: Alfred Wagstaff Jr.
- In office 1846–1847
- In office 1842–1843

Personal details
- Born: May 11, 1811 Islip, New York, U.S.
- Died: March 31, 1883 (aged 71) Babylon, New York, U.S.
- Spouse(s): Hannah Willets (died 1843) Marie Antoinette Carll (m. 1845)
- Children: 2
- Education: Yale College
- Occupation: Politician

Richard Athil Udall (May 11, 1811 – March 31, 1883) was an American politician from New York.

== Early life ==
Richard Athil Udall was born on May 11, 1811, in Islip, Long Island, New York, to Prudence (née Carll) and Dr. Richard Udall. He graduated from Yale College in 1830. He then studied law with his brother-in-law Judge Selah B. Strong of Setauket. Due to needing to support his father, he was unable to practice law.

== Career ==
Strong spent his life in Islip. He served as a member of the New York State Assembly, representing Suffolk County in 1842, 1846 and 1866.

== Personal life ==
Strong married Hannah Willets, daughter of Daniel Willets. His wife died in 1843. He later married Marie Antoinette Carll, daughter of Timothy P. Carll, of Babylon on February 5, 1845. He had one son and one daughter.

In 1875, Udall went blind. In January 1876 he had a cataract operation on both eyes and his sight was restored. He had a stroke of paralysis and apoplexy on March 29, 1883. He died on March 31 in Babylon.

== Legacy ==
Udall Road in Suffolk County, which extends from central Baywood to the middle of West Islip, is named after Udall. On it is two middle schools, Udall Road Middle School of the West Islip Union Free School District in West Islip, and Brentwood West Middle School of the Brentwood Union Free School District in Baywood.

New York State Assembly
Preceded by Henry C. Platt	New York State Assembly; Suffolk County, 2nd District; 1866	Succeeded by Alfred Wagstaff Jr.
