= John S. Havens =

American businessman and politician

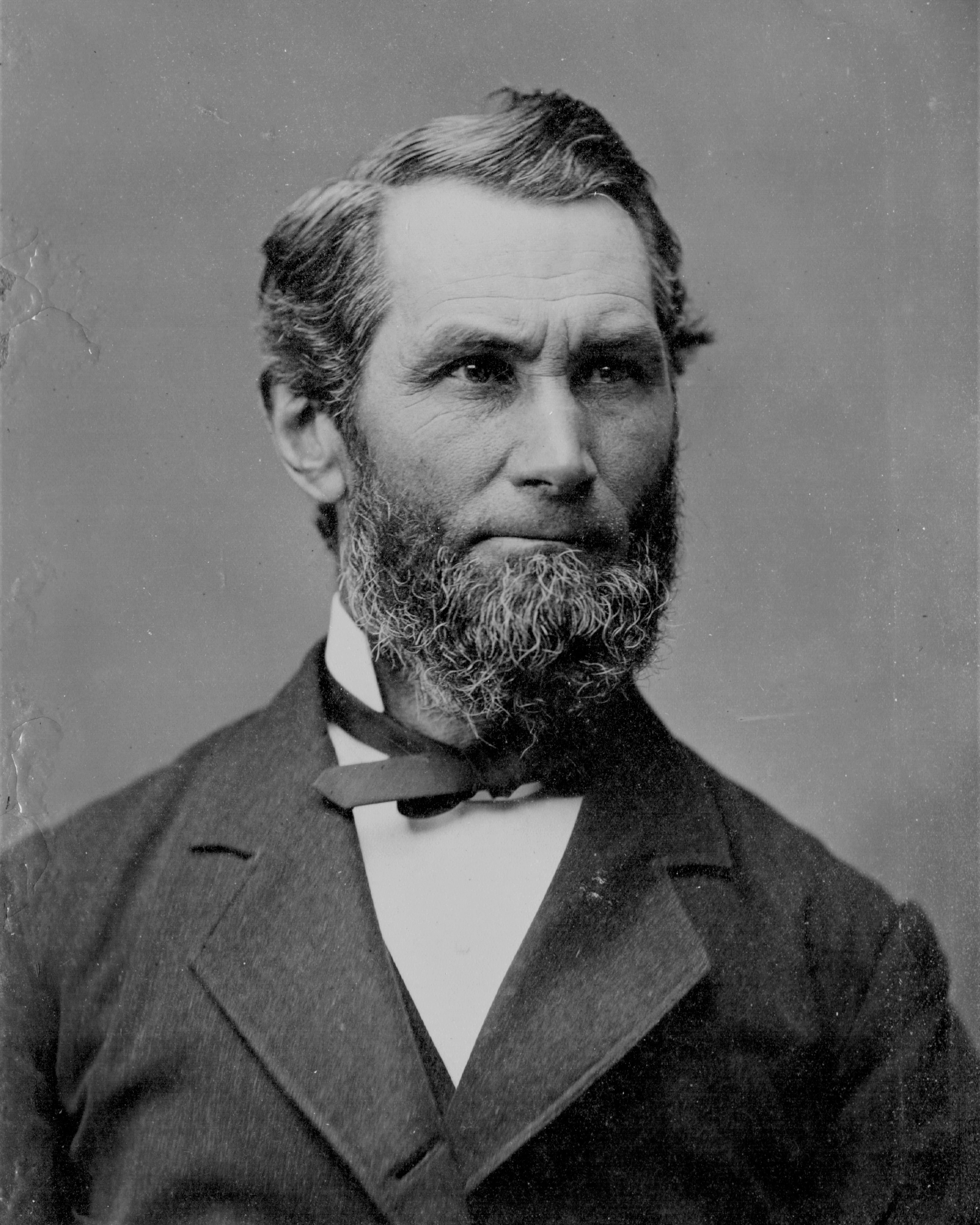
John Scudder Havens

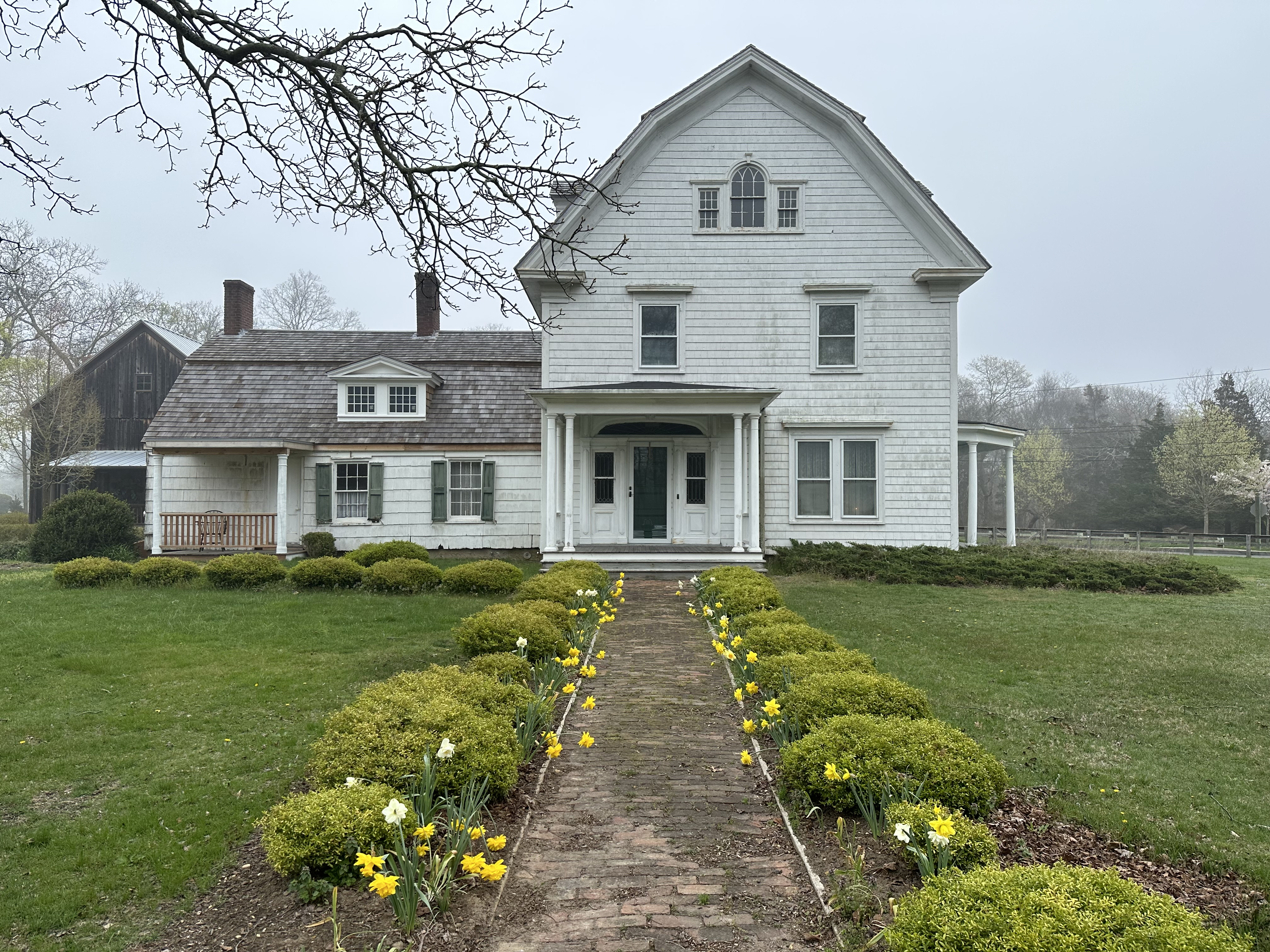
John Scudder and Mary Pelletreau Havens Homestead, Center Moriches

The Usurpations of the Federal Government, 1863 speech of Hon. J.S. Havens

John Scudder Havens (October 20, 1826 – August 17, 1903) was an American businessman and politician from New York.

== Life ==
Havens was born on October 20, 1826, in Patchogue, New York, the son of Col. John Havens and Elizabeth "Eliza" Ketcham.

His father had sold the family's land in the Moriches and moved to Patchogue. Havens would later buy it back and commission an addition to the Havens homestead in 1898 done by architect Isaac H. Green Jr. Havens ran a successful general store in Patchogue with his brother, and later expanded his business ventures to include insurance, banking, land surveying, and paper mills. He served as Assessor of Brookhaven Town, Suffolk County Overseer of the Poor, Brookhaven Town Supervisor from 1859 to 1862 and again from 1878 to 1881, and in the New York State Assembly from 1862 to 1863. His brother, Charles S. Havens, also served as Brookhaven Town Supervisor and in the State Assembly in 1878.

February 17, 1863, Havens gave a speech in the New York State Assembly against the suspension of habeas corpus.

Havens married Mary Amelia Pelletreau in 1865. They had four children: Eliza "Leila" Havens, Archibald Sidney Havens, Aimee M. Havens, and Sarah Margaret Havens. None of his children ever married.

Havens died on August 17, 1903. He was buried in Mount Pleasant Cemetery.

New York State Assembly
Preceded by Alexander J. Bergen	New York State Assembly; Suffolk County, 2nd District; 1862–1863	Succeeded by Henry C. Platt
