= Edward Mitchell (New York politician) =

American lawyer

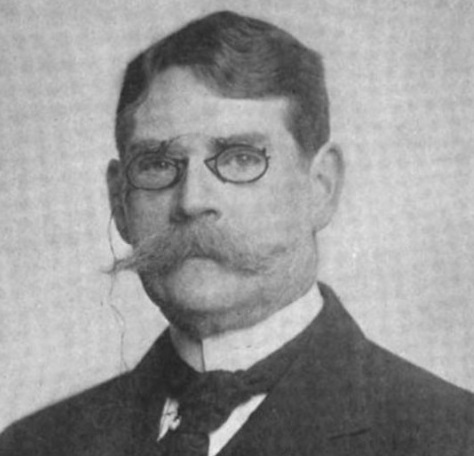
- Columbia University Quarterly, June 1909

26th United States Attorney for the Southern District of New York
- In office September 16, 1889 – February 1, 1894
- Preceded by: Stephen A. Walker
- Succeeded by: Henry C. Platt

Member of the New York State Assembly from New York County's 21st District
- In office January 1, 1880 – December 31, 1880
- Preceded by: J. C. Julius Langbein
- Succeeded by: William J. Trimble

Personal details
- Born: April 15, 1842 New York City, New York, US
- Died: February 15, 1909 (aged 66) New York City, New York
- Resting place: Woodlawn Cemetery, Bronx, New York
- Party: Republican
- Spouse: Caroline C. Woolsey (m. 1867-1909, his death)
- Children: 1
- Relatives: John M. Mitchell (brother)
- Education: Columbia College; Columbia Law School
- Profession: Attorney

Military service
- Allegiance: United States; New York
- Branch/service: New York National Guard
- Years of service: 1881–1886
- Rank: Lieutenant Colonel
- Unit: 1st Division

Edward Mitchell (April 15, 1842 – February 15, 1909) was an American lawyer and politician from New York. A Republican, He was a graduate of Columbia College and Columbia Law School. Mitchell was most notable for his service in the New York State Assembly in 1880, and United States Attorney for the Southern District of New York from 1889 to 1894.

== Early life ==
Mitchell was born on April 15, 1842, on Charlton Street in New York City, New York, the eldest son of Edward Mitchell, a lawyer and judge who served on the New York Supreme Court and the New York Court of Appeals, and Mary P. Berrian. His brother was congressman John M. Mitchell.

Mitchell attended Columbia Grammar School from 1854 to 1857. He then went to Columbia College in 1857, where he was a member of the Philolexian Society, graduating from there with a B.A. in 1861.

== Start of career ==
He then went to Columbia Law School, but he left that year to serve in the American Civil War a volunteer field agent for the United States Sanitary Commission. He served in Richmond, Antietam, Port Hudson, and the Red River expedition. Afterwards, he finished his studies at Columbia Law School, graduating from there with an LL.B. in 1865. He was admitted to the bar later that year and practiced law. In 1867, he married Caroline Carson Woolsey. They had a daughter, Eliza.

In 1879, Mitchell was elected to the New York State Assembly as a Republican, representing the New York County 21st District. He served in the Assembly in 1880. In 1880, he became a trustee of Columbia. From 1881 to 1886, he was a lieutenant colonel in the New York National Guard and a Judge Advocate of the 1st Division. In 1883 and 1886, he unsuccessfully ran for the New York Supreme Court.

== Later career ==
In 1889, President Harrison appointed him United States Attorney for the Southern District of New York. He served in the office until 1894. In 1897, he briefly served as New York City Commissioner of Parks. For many years, he was also senior member of the law firm Mitchell & Mitchell.

== Civic and professional memberships ==
Mitchell was an incorporator of the University Club. He was a member of the American Geographical Society. He was a member of the New York City Bar Association, serving as its treasurer from 1874 to 1885 and vice-president from vice-president from 1885 to 1886. He was also a member of the New York State Bar Association, the Metropolitan Club, the Union League Club, the Tuxedo Club, the Shinnecock Hills Golf Club, and the Washington D.C. Metropolitan Club.

== Death and burial ==
Mitchell died at his Manhattan home on February 15, 1909. He was buried in Woodlawn Cemetery.

New York State Assembly
Preceded by J. C. Julius Langbein	New York State Assembly; New York County, 21st District; 1880	Succeeded by William J. Trimble
Legal offices
Preceded by Stephen A. Walker	U.S. Attorney for the Southern District of New York; 1889–1894	Succeeded by Henry C. Platt
