= Joyce Hens Green =

American judge (1928–2024)

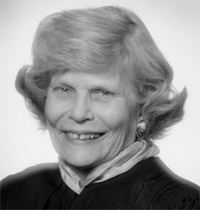

Senior Judge of the United States District Court for the District of Columbia
- In office July 1, 1995 – October 10, 2024

Presiding Judge of the United States Foreign Intelligence Surveillance Court
- In office May 19, 1990 – May 19, 1995
- Appointed by: William Rehnquist
- Preceded by: James Ellsworth Noland
- Succeeded by: Royce Lamberth

Judge of the United States District Court for the District of Columbia
- In office May 11, 1979 – July 1, 1995
- Appointed by: Jimmy Carter
- Preceded by: Howard Francis Corcoran
- Succeeded by: Henry H. Kennedy Jr.

Associate Judge of the Superior Court of the District of Columbia
- In office 1968–1979
- Appointed by: Lyndon B. Johnson
- Succeeded by: Henry H. Kennedy Jr.

Personal details
- Born: Ruth Joyce Martha Hens; November 13, 1928 New York City, U.S.
- Died: October 10, 2024 (aged 95) Towson, Maryland, U.S.
- Spouse: Samuel Green (m. 1965; died 1983)
- Children: 3
- Education: University of Maryland, College Park (BA); George Washington University (JD)

Ruth Joyce Martha Hens Green (November 13, 1928 – October 10, 2024) was an American lawyer who served as a United States district judge of the United States District Court for the District of Columbia from 1979 to 2024.

== Education and career ==
Born in New York City on November 13, 1928, Green graduated from the University of Maryland, College Park, receiving a Bachelor of Arts degree in 1949. She entered the University of Maryland School of Law and transferred to the George Washington University Law School, receiving a Juris Doctor from that institution in two years, in 1951. She also received an honorary Doctor of Laws from George Washington University in 1994 and has been named a Distinguished Alumnus of Towson High School. Green practiced law in the District of Columbia and Virginia until she was appointed Associate Judge of the Superior Court of the District of Columbia in 1968, where she served for over a decade.

=== Federal judicial service ===
On March 6, 1979, President Jimmy Carter nominated Green to be a United States district judge of the United States District Court for the District of Columbia, to a seat vacated by Judge Howard Francis Corcoran. She was confirmed by the United States Senate on May 10, 1979, and received her commission on May 11, 1979. She assumed senior status on July 1, 1995, and was succeeded by Henry H. Kennedy Jr., who had also succeeded her on the Superior Court bench. Green was a member of the United States Foreign Intelligence Surveillance Court (FISC) from May 1988 until May 1995, and served as its presiding judge from May 1990 until May 1995.

== Significant cases ==
=== IRS v. The Church of Scientology ===
In 1992, Judge Green ruled in favor of the Church of Scientology in the case of Church of Scientology v. Internal Revenue Service on a pretrial motion for summary judgment.

=== Release of BCCI's frozen assets ===
On September 1, 1995, Green ordered $393 million seized from the Bank of Credit and Commerce International turned over to the bank's victims. BCCI had been involved in criminal activity and its assets had been freed in 1992. Green had heard, and ruled on, three challenges to the release of the seized funds.

=== FEC v. The Christian Coalition ===
Green ruled against the Federal Election Commission in Federal Election Commission v. The Christian Coalition Civil Action No. 96-1781 Opinion & Order; and Judgment, filed August 2, 1999. The FEC had challenged the propriety of the Christian Coalition's distribution of voter guides, on the grounds it had been too closely tied to large corporate donors.

But, Green's 108-page judgment had supported the FEC in two instances; when the Christian Coalition had broken FEC guidelines in their explicit advocacy of the re-election of Newt Gingrich; and when the Christian Coalition had handed over their membership list to Senate candidate Oliver North.

=== In re Guantanamo Detainee Cases ===
Following the United States Supreme Court ruling in Rasul v. Bush (2004), which determined that detainees had the right of habeas corpus and due process to challenge their detention before an impartial tribunal, many habeas corpus cases were filed on behalf of detainees at Guantanamo Bay detention camp. On September 15, 2004, Judge Green was appointed the coordinating judge for all Guantanamo Bay habeas corpus cases.

On January 31, 2005, Judge Green ruled that:

(1) detainees had the fundamental Fifth Amendment right not to be deprived of liberty without due process of law;
(2) complaints stated a claim for violation of due process based on Combatant Status Review Tribunal's ("CSRT") extensive reliance on classified information in its resolution of "enemy combatant" status of detainees, the detainees' inability to review that information, and the prohibition of assistance by counsel jointly deprived detainees of sufficient notice of the factual basis for their detention and denied them a fair opportunity to challenge their incarceration;
(3) due process required that CSRTs sufficiently consider whether the evidence upon which the tribunal relied in making its "enemy combatant" determinations had been obtained through torture;
(4) complaints stated a claim for violation of due process based on the government's employment of an overly broad definition of "enemy combatant" subject to indefinite detention; and
(5) Geneva Conventions applied to the Taliban detainees, but not to members of the al Qaeda terrorist organization.

== Personal life and death ==
She married Samuel Green in 1965 and had two sons and a daughter. Her husband died in 1983. Hens Green died from acute myeloid leukemia in Towson, Maryland on October 10, 2024, at the age of 95.

== Notes ==
1. Hon. Joyce Hens Green, American Inns of Court Professionalism Award, June 16, 2004
2. Federal Court releases $393 million fdr BCCI victims, Department of Justice, September 1, 1995
3. Federal Election Commission v. Christian Coalition, United States Court of the District of Columbia, August 3, 1999
4. A Victory for Christian Coalition, Washington Post, August 3, 1999
5. Resolution of the Executive Session, United States Court of the District of Columbia, September 15, 2004, resolution assigning Green the senior role in reviewing Guantanamo detainees legal requests
6. ^{a} Judge Rules Detainee Tribunals Illegal, Washington Post, February 1, 2005
7. Judge Backs Guantanamo Detainee Challenges: Judge Allows Some Guantanamo Detainees to Challenge Confinement, Criticizes White House Policy, ABC News, January 31, 2005
8. Judicial Wake-Up Call, Washington Post, February 1, 2005
9. "Righting wrongs for Guantanamo detainees". Salon (magazine). February 1, 2005. Archived from the original on February 17, 2011.
10. Panel Ignored Evidence on Detainee: U.S. Military Intelligence, German Authorities Found No Ties to Terrorists, Washington Post, March 27, 2005
11. Mustafa Aid Idir's dossier (.pdf) from his CSRT, pages 26–27 of 53.

== See also ==
- List of United States federal judges by longevity of service

Legal offices
Preceded by Howard Francis Corcoran	Judge of the United States District Court for the District of Columbia; 1979–1995	Succeeded by Henry H. Kennedy Jr.
Preceded by James Ellsworth Noland	Presiding Judge of the United States Foreign Intelligence Surveillance Court; 1990–1995	Succeeded by Royce Lamberth
