= Howard Francis Corcoran =

American judge (1906–1989)

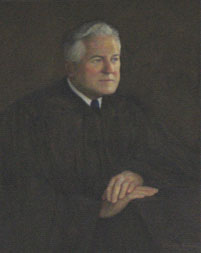

Senior Judge of the United States District Court for the District of Columbia
- In office November 30, 1977 – May 11, 1989

Judge of the United States District Court for the District of Columbia
- In office March 11, 1965 – November 30, 1977
- Appointed by: Lyndon B. Johnson
- Preceded by: Charles F. McLaughlin
- Succeeded by: Joyce Hens Green

United States Attorney for the Southern District of New York Acting
- In office June 10, 1943 – August 2, 1943
- President: Franklin D. Roosevelt
- Preceded by: Mathias F. Correa
- Succeeded by: James B. M. McNally

Personal details
- Born: Howard Francis Corcoran; January 25, 1906 Pawtucket, Rhode Island, US
- Died: May 11, 1989 (aged 83) Washington, D.C., US
- Education: Princeton University (AB); Harvard University (LLB)

Howard Francis Corcoran (January 25, 1906 – May 11, 1989) was an American attorney who was a district judge of the United States District Court for the District of Columbia.

== Education and career ==
Born in Pawtucket, Rhode Island, Corcoran received an Artium Baccalaureus degree from Princeton University in 1928 and a Bachelor of Laws from Harvard Law School in 1931. He served in the United States Department of Agriculture from 1933 to 1934, worked for the Tennessee Valley Authority from 1934 to 1935, and was a legal associate for the Securities and Exchange Commission from 1935 to 1938. He was an Assistant United States Attorney for the Southern District of New York from 1938 to 1943, and was the United States Attorney for the Southern District of New York in 1943. He then served in the United States Army during World War II, from 1943 to 1945. He achieved the rank of Lieutenant Colonel. After the war, he entered private practice in New York City, New York from 1946 to 1954, and then in Washington, D.C. until 1965.

== Federal judicial service ==
On March 1, 1965, Corcoran was nominated by President Lyndon B. Johnson to a seat on the United States District Court for the District of Columbia vacated by Judge Charles F. McLaughlin. Corcoran was confirmed by the United States Senate on March 11, 1965, and received his commission the same day. He assumed senior status on November 30, 1977, serving in that capacity until his death on May 11, 1989, in Washington, D.C.

== Sources ==
Legal offices
Preceded by Charles F. McLaughlin	Judge of the United States District Court for the District of Columbia; 1965–1977	Succeeded by Joyce Hens Green
