= Stephen A. Walker =

American attorney from New York

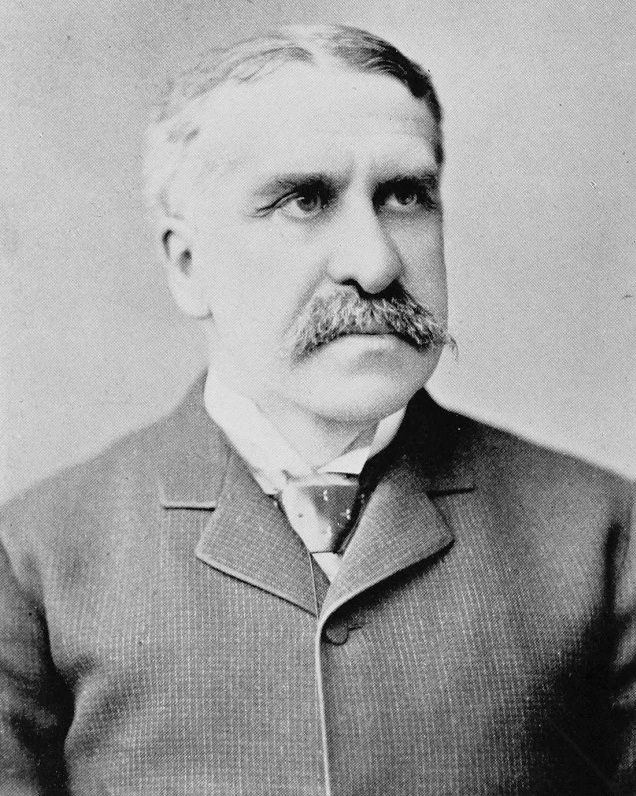
From a privately published 1893 memorial volume. Via HathiTrust

Stephen Ambrose Walker (November 2, 1835 – February 5, 1893) was an American lawyer from New York. He was most prominent for his service as United States Attorney for the Southern District of New York from 1886 to 1889.

== Life ==
Walker was born on November 2, 1835, in Brattleboro, Vermont, the son of Congregational minister Charles Walker and Lucertia Ambrose. The family moved to Pittsford in 1846. His nephew was Professor Williston Walker of the Hartford Theological Seminary.

Walker attended Burr Seminary in Manchester. He then went to Middlebury College, where he was the valedictorian of his graduating class in 1858. He became a trustee of the college in 1871. After graduating, he spent a year in charge of the Seminary in Chester, Geauga County, Ohio. He then spent two years as principal of the Susquehanna Seminary in Binghamton, New York. After he finished his time in the seminary, he entered the law office of Daniel S. Dickinson of Binghamton and studied law under him.

Walker was admitted to the New York bar in 1861. In 1862, during the American Civil War, Vermont governor Holbrook had him appointed Paymaster with the rank of major. He spent the next three years in various stations in Virginia and the Department of the Gulf, Washington, Cincinnati, and other Northern posts. He was in Knoxville when General Longstreet began the Knoxville campaign, trapping Walker in the city for many weeks. He and the other paymasters were prepared to burn the money in their custody if Longstreet took the city, even though the general sent word he would hang them if they did this. However, General Sherman relieved the Union Army and lifted the siege. For his service, he was brevetted Lieutenant-Colonel. While serving in Washington in 1862, when funds to pay troops were not available, a private soldier and mail carrier for a Connecticut regiment approached Walker and offered to advance the funds necessary to pay his regiment. The private was sewing machine inventor Elias Howe, and after the war the two became friends for the rest of Howe's life, the Howe Sewing Machine Company even making Walker counsel.

After the War, Walker moved to New York City and joined the law office of Charles H. Hunt, the assistant United States District Attorney under Dickinson. Interested in renewing his law studies, he spent two years attending lectures in Columbia Law School under Dr. Dwight. He then became the junior member of the law firm Buckham, Smales & Walker. After Mr. Buckham retired due to poor health, the firm became Smales & Walker. After Smales died, Walker continued practicing on his own. One of his early cases involved Bret Harte, he represented J. R. Osgood & Co. and John J. Kiernan, and he was involved in the settlement between John Roach's firm and the Navy Department.

In 1876, Walker was appointed a member of the New York City Board of Education. In 1880, he became President of the Board. He resigned from the Board in 1886, when he was appointed the United States Attorney for the Southern District from New York. He served this position until 1889. He was also a trustee of the Tilden Trust.

Walker never married. He joined the New York City Bar Association in 1870, serving as vice-president from 1889 to 1891 and as a member of the Executive Committee at the time of his death. He was also a member of the University Club. He was a trustee of the University Place Presbyterian Church.

Walker died of pneumonia at his brother's home on February 5, 1893. He was buried in Evergreen Cemetery in Pittsford.

Legal offices
Preceded by William Dorsheimer	U.S. Attorney for the Southern District of New York; 1886–1889	Succeeded by Edward Mitchell
