= J. C. Julius Langbein =

American politician

Johann Christoph Julius Langbein
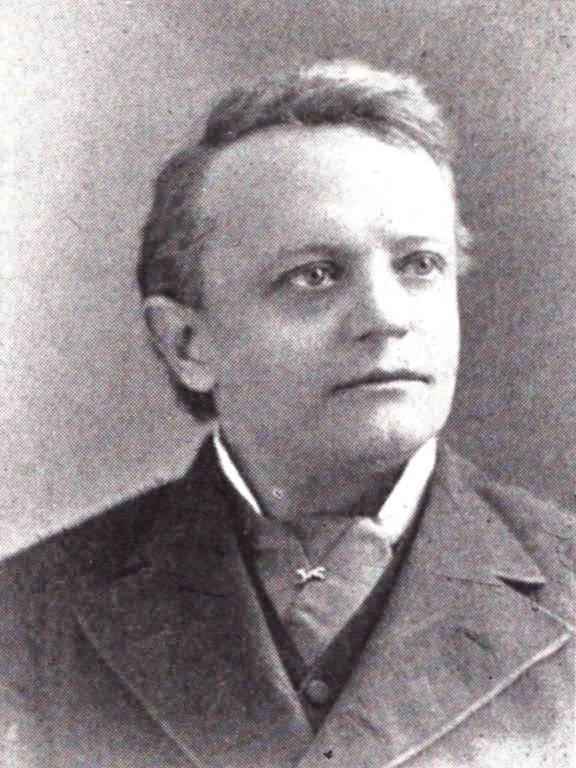
- Langbein as depicted in Deeds of Valor
- Born: September 22, 1846; Germany
- Died: January 28, 1910 (aged 63); New York City
- Burial place: New York City
- Military career
- Allegiance: United States of America; Union
- Branch: United States Army; Union Army
- Service years: 1861 - 1863
- Rank: Musician
- Nickname: Jennie
- Units: (New York (state)) Company B, 9th New York Volunteer Infantry Regiment
- Conflicts: American Civil War
- Awards: Medal of Honor

Johann Christoph Julius Langbein (September 22, 1846 – January 28, 1910) was an American lawyer and politician from New York. He was a drummer boy in the Union Army and a Medal of Honor recipient for his actions in the American Civil War.

== Life ==
Langbein joined the 9th New York Infantry from New York City in May 1861, and left the regiment in 1863.

He was a Republican member of the New York State Assembly (New York Co., 21st D.) in 1877 and 1879. In November 1879, he was elected Civil Justice of the 10th District.

State Senator George F. Langbein (1842–1911) was his brother and law partner.

Julius Langbein is buried in Woodlawn Cemetery in The Bronx, New York City.

== Medal of Honor citation ==
Rank and organization: Musician, Company B, 9th New York Infantry. Place and date: At Camden, N.C., April 19, 1862. Entered service at: New York, N.Y. Born: September 29, 1846, Germany. Date of issue: January 7, 1895.

Citation:

A drummer boy, 15 years of age, he voluntarily and under a heavy fire went to the aid of a wounded officer, procured medical assistance for him, and aided in carrying him to a place of safety.

== See also ==
- List of American Civil War Medal of Honor recipients: A–F

New York State Assembly
Preceded by Joseph B. Fallon	New York State Assembly; New York County, 21st District; 1877	Succeeded by Alexander Thain
Preceded by Alexander Thain	New York State Assembly; New York County, 21st District; 1879	Succeeded by Edward Mitchell
