= Henry C. Platt =

American lawyer and politician

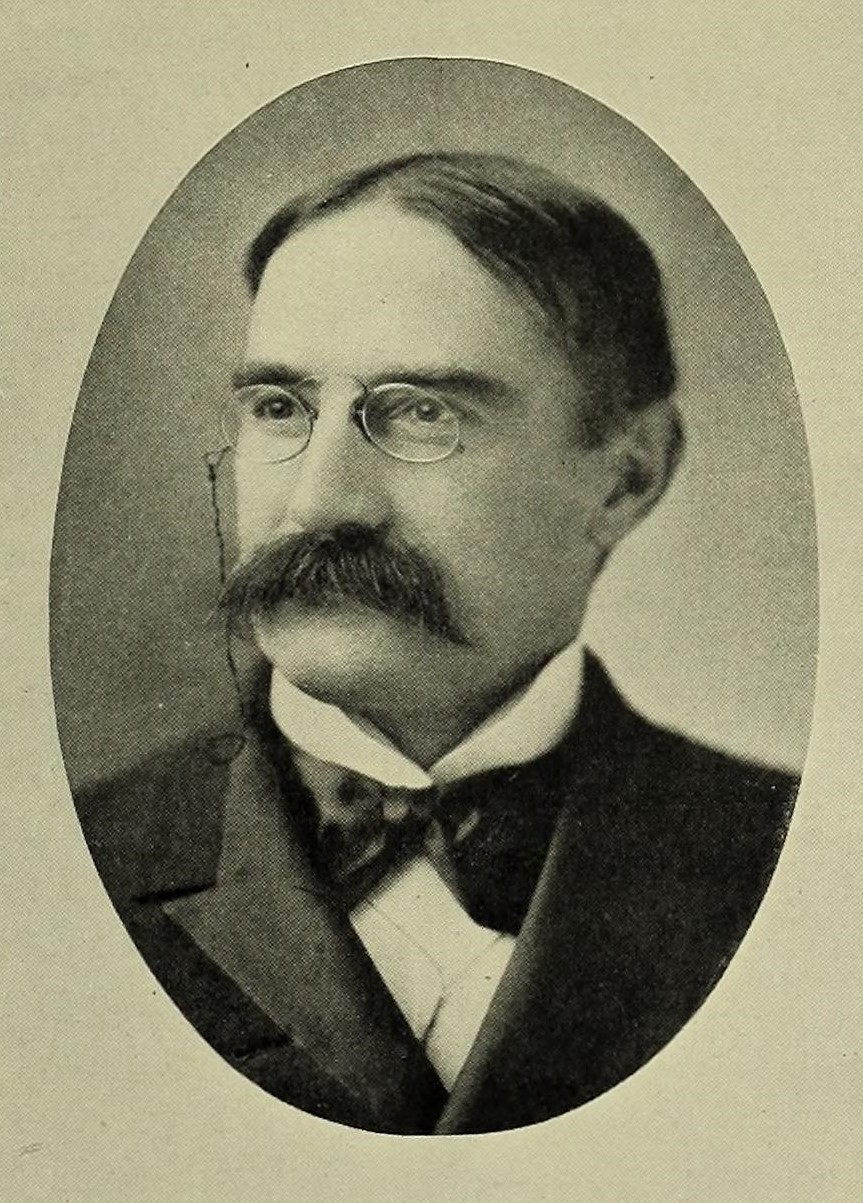
- Born: Henry Clay Platt; October 22, 1840; New York City, New York
- Died: December 16, 1904 (aged 64); Huntington, New York
- Education: Princeton University
- Spouse: Jennie Dussenberry (m. 1864)

Acting United States Attorney for the Southern District of New York
- In office February 1, 1894 – July 23, 1894
- President: Grover Cleveland
- Preceded by: Edward Mitchell
- Succeeded by: Wallace Macfarlane

Member of the New York State Assembly from Suffolk County's 2nd District
- In office January 1, 1864 – December 31, 1865
- Preceded by: John S. Havens
- Succeeded by: Richard Athil Udall

Personal details
- Party: Democratic

Henry Clay Platt (October 22, 1840 – December 16, 1904) was an American lawyer and politician from New York.

== Life ==
Platt was born on October 22, 1840, in New York City, New York, the son of David Platt and Sarah Gould.

Platt attended Huntington Academy and Ashland Hall in West Bloomfield, New Jersey. He then went to Princeton College, graduating from there in 1858 as the youngest member of his class. He then studied law in the office of Van Winkle & Halsey. He was admitted to the bar in 1863.

In 1863, Platt was elected to the New York State Assembly as a Democrat, representing the Suffolk County 2nd District. He served in the Assembly in 1864 and 1865. After he left the Assembly, he formed a law practice in New York City with former state senator Robert Christie Jr. When his father died, he moved to Huntington, New York, and had a general law practice there.

In 1886, Platt moved to New York City and practiced law there. President Cleveland appointed him Assistant United States Attorney for the Southern District of New York, a position he retained under the President Harrison. In 1894, he became the United States Attorney to fill a vacancy caused by Edward Mitchell's term expiring. Wallace Macfarlane was then appointed United States Attorney, and Attorney General Olney appointed him Assistant United States Attorney. He served that position until July 1904, when he resigned due to poor health.

Platt was a member of the Princeton Club, Chi Phi, and the Cliosophic Society. He wrote a book in 1876, "Old Times in Huntington." He was a member of St. John's Episcopal Church in Huntington. In 1864, he married Jennie Dussenberry. Their only son, Harry, died at the age of 21.

Platt died at his Huntington home on December 16, 1904. He was buried in Huntington Rural Cemetery.

New York State Assembly
Preceded by John S. Havens	New York State Assembly; Suffolk County, 2nd District; 1864–1865	Succeeded by Richard Athil Udall
Legal offices
Preceded by Edward Mitchell	U.S. Attorney for the Southern District of New York; 1894	Succeeded by Wallace Macfarlane
