= Mathias F. Correa =

American lawyer (1910–1963)

United States Attorney for the Southern District of New York
- In office July 1941 – June 10, 1943
- President: Franklin D. Roosevelt
- Preceded by: John T. Cahill
- Succeeded by: Howard F. Corcoran (Acting)

Personal details
- Born: March 4, 1910 Cuba
- Died: December 5, 1963 (aged 53) Port Chester, New York, US
- Education: Fordham University (A.B.); Columbia Law School (LL.B.)

Mathias F. Correa (March 4, 1910 – December 5, 1963) was an American intelligence officer, lawyer and prosecutor. He briefly served as Acting United States Attorney from March to July 1941 and was United States Attorney for the Southern District of New York from 1941 to 1943.

== Biography ==
He graduated from Fordham University, A.B., 1931 and Columbia Law School, LL.B., 1934. As an Assistant United States Attorney, he was a member of the trial team in the prosecution of former United States Circuit Judge Martin T. Manton. During the Second World War, he worked in OSS counterintelligence in Italy. Later, holding the rank of major, he was a liaison between the U.S. Army and Secretary of the Navy James Forrestal, and was present for the raising of the flag at Mount Suribachi, Iwo Jima. After the War, he served as Special Assistant to the Secretary of the Navy and was a member of the National Security Council Survey Committee.

With Allen Dulles and William H. Jackson, he was appointed by President Harry S. Truman to conduct a study of the newly created CIA and co-authored a report to the National Security Council on the CIA and the National Organization for Intelligence. He was a partner at the firm later known as Cahill Gordon & Reindel from 1946 to 1963 and argued before the Supreme Court in United States v. Procter & Gamble Co. as lead counsel for Colgate-Palmolive.

Correa died of an internal hemorrhage at United Hospital in Port Chester, New York, in 1963. He was buried in Arlington National Cemetery.
