= Damian Williams (lawyer) =

American lawyer (born 1980)

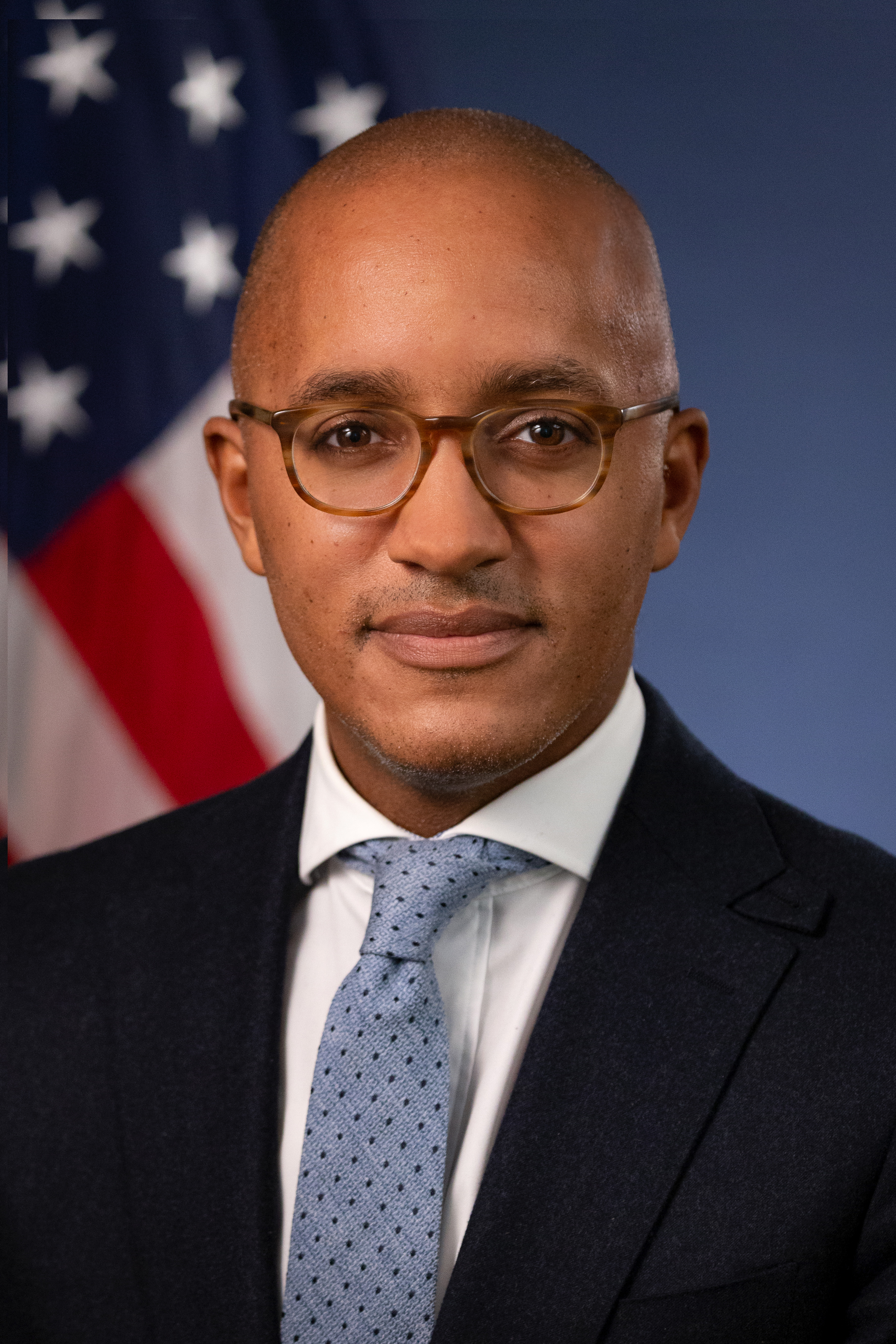
- Official portrait, 2021

United States Attorney for the Southern District of New York
- In office October 10, 2021 – December 13, 2024
- Appointed by: Joe Biden
- Preceded by: Audrey Strauss
- Succeeded by: Jay Clayton

Personal details
- Born: Andre Damian Williams Jr. 1980 (age 45–46) New York City, New York, U.S.
- Party: Democratic
- Education: Harvard University (BA); Emmanuel College, Cambridge (MPhil); Yale University (JD)

Andre Damian Williams Jr. (born 1980) is an American lawyer who served as the United States attorney for the Southern District of New York from 2021 to 2024. He has been involved in the prosecution of numerous high-profile individuals, including Ghislaine Maxwell, Sam Bankman-Fried, Sean Combs, Mayor Eric Adams, and U.S. Senator Bob Menendez.

== Early life and education ==
Williams was born in New York City and raised in the Atlanta metropolitan area, the son of Jamaican immigrants. His parents divorced.

He attended Woodward Academy for high school, where he was student body president in his final year. He received a Bachelor of Arts in economics from Harvard University in 2002 and a Master of Philosophy in international relations from Emmanuel College, Cambridge in 2003, where he was awarded the Lionel de Jersey Harvard Scholarship in 2002. Afterward, Williams worked for John Kerry's 2004 presidential campaign in Cedar Rapids, Iowa, and South Carolina and as a "body man" for the chairman of the Democratic National Committee, Terry McAuliffe.

Williams then enrolled at Yale Law School, where he was supported by The Paul & Daisy Soros Fellowships for New Americans. He became an editor of The Yale Law Journal and graduated in 2007 with a Juris Doctor. One of his essays about improving voting rights after Hurricane Katrina was published in the Yale Law Journal in 2007.

== Career ==
After law school, Williams was a law clerk to Judge Merrick Garland of the U.S. Court of Appeals for the District of Columbia Circuit from 2007 to 2008 and to Justice John Paul Stevens of the U.S. Supreme Court from 2008 to 2009. He was in private practice from 2009 to 2012 as a litigation associate at the law firm Paul, Weiss, Rifkind, Wharton & Garrison.

From 2012 to 2021, Williams was an assistant United States attorney in the United States Attorney's Office for the Southern District of New York. In the role, he served as a chief of the securities and commodities fraud task force from 2018 to 2021. In 2018, Williams helped secure the conviction of Sheldon Silver, the former speaker of the New York State Assembly.

In June 2025, Damian left his role as partner at Paul, Weiss to join Jenner & Block as partner.

=== U.S. attorney for the Southern District of New York ===
In March 2021, Senate Majority Leader Chuck Schumer recommended Williams to be the next U.S. attorney for the Southern District of New York. On August 10, 2021, President Joe Biden nominated Williams to serve in the role.

On September 30, 2021, his nomination was reported out of committee by voice vote. On October 5, 2021, Williams was confirmed in the Senate by voice vote. He became the first African-American U.S. attorney for the Southern District of New York and, as of October 2021, was one of seven African-Americans among 232 assistant U.S. attorneys and executives in the district. He was sworn into office on October 10, 2021. Upon his confirmation, Williams was slated to oversee cases including the trial of Jeffrey Epstein associate Ghislaine Maxwell and the case of Sayfullo Habibullaevic Saipov, who was charged with committing the 2017 New York City truck attack.

Williams oversaw the indictment of Lieutenant Governor Brian Benjamin, who resigned after being arrested on federal bribery charges.

On December 13, 2022, his office indicted Sam Bankman-Fried, ex-CEO of FTX, on eight counts of fraud and conspiracy. On March 23, 2023, his office also indicted Do Kwon, co-founder of TerraUSD upon his arrest at the Podgorica Airport in Montenegro, on eight counts of fraud and conspiracy. On November 2, 2023, Bankman-Fried was found guilty of the seven counts that went to the jury.

On January 6, 2023, his office announced that Real Housewives of Salt Lake City star Jennifer Shah was sentenced by United States District Judge Sidney H. Stein to 78 months in prison for running a nationwide telemarketing fraud scheme. Shah previously pled guilty to one count of conspiracy to commit wire fraud in connection with telemarketing.

On September 22, 2023, Williams announced the indictment of Senator Bob Menendez of New Jersey on bribery charges. On September 17, 2024, Williams announced the Diddy indictment. On September 26, 2024, Williams announced the Eric Adams indictment.

On November 25, 2024, Williams announced his anticipated resignation effective 11:59 p.m. on December 13, 2024.

== Personal life ==
Williams' family is from Frome, a sugar producing region in Westmoreland, Jamaica. Williams married academic and fellow Harvard graduate Jennifer Wynn in 2012 in Manhattan, five years after they met on a bus trip from Washington to New York.

== See also ==
- List of law clerks for the fourth seat of the Supreme Court of the United States

Legal offices
Preceded by Audrey Strauss	United States Attorney for the Southern District of New York; 2021–2024	Vacant
