= Harel Locker =

Israeli lawyer and civil servant (born 1965)

- הראל לוקר
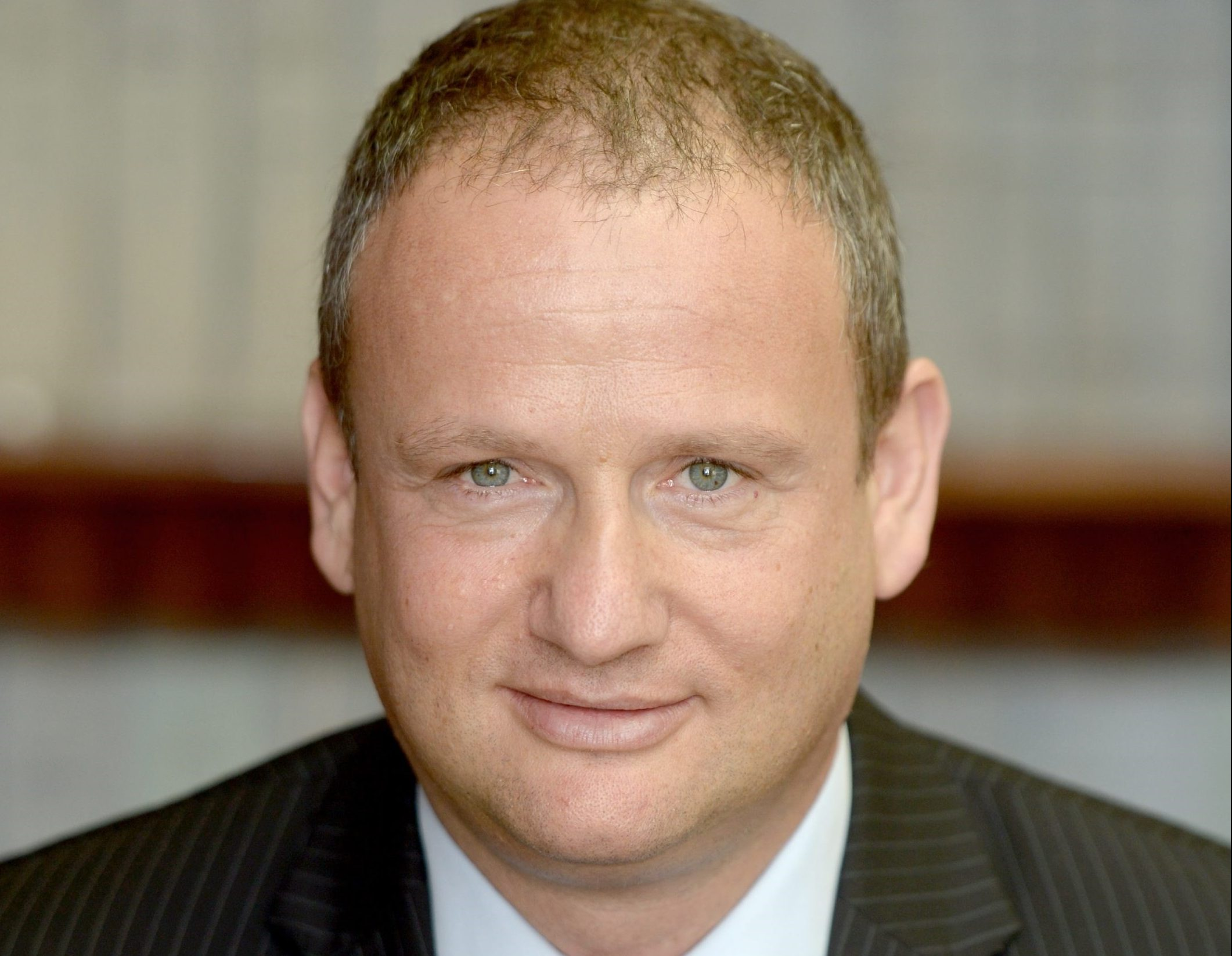
- Locker, March 2014
- Education: Tel Aviv University (LL.B.); Tel Aviv University (Accounting); Georgetown University Law Center (LL.M.)
- Alma mater: Tel Aviv University; Georgetown University Law Center
- Organization(s): Paz Oil and Energy Company Ltd. Israel Aerospace Industries
- Known for: Director General of the Prime Minister's Office (Israel) (2011–2015); Chairman of the Board of Israel Aerospace Industries (2017–); Chairman of the Board of Paz Oil and Energy Company Ltd. (2021–)

Harel Locker (Hebrew: הראל לוקר) is an Israeli executive who has served since 2021 as the Chairman of the Board of Paz Oil and Energy Company Ltd. He previously served as Chairman of the Board of Israel Aerospace Industries (IAI) and as the Director General of the Israeli Prime Minister's Office from 2011 to 2015.

== Education ==
Locker holds a Bachelor of Laws (LL.B.) from the Faculty of Law and a Bachelor's degree in Accounting from the Faculty of Management at Tel Aviv University, and a Master of Laws (LL.M.) with distinction in Taxation from Georgetown University Law Center in Washington, D.C., United States.

== Career ==
=== Legal career ===
Since completing his studies in 1994 at Tel Aviv University, Locker has practiced commercial law as both an Israeli and American attorney (licensed in New York), working for law firms in Tel Aviv and on Wall Street, New York.

=== Director General of the Prime Minister's Office ===
In 2011, Israeli Prime Minister Benjamin Netanyahu appointed Locker as Director General of the Prime Minister's Office. Upon assuming the position, Locker initiated a significant organizational reform, establishing and leading the Prime Minister's Economic and Social Staff, which coordinated the government's activities in economic and social fields.

During his tenure, Locker led strategic planning and implementation of government policy in a wide range of economic and social issues, coordinated inter-ministerial staff work, and supervised the development of the state budget, ministry work plans, goals, and performance indicators. He also oversaw national cross-sector projects prioritized by the government.

Locker's period as Director General was marked by major economic reforms, and he was named several times among the most influential figures in the Israeli economy.

In November 2014, Locker announced his resignation from the position, though at the Prime Minister's request he continued to serve for nearly another year. In total, he held the role for approximately four years - the longest tenure for a Director General of the Prime Minister's Office in the previous forty years.

During his service, Locker also led Israel's economic foreign policy, strengthening and institutionalizing economic relations with countries such as China, Japan, the United States, Latin American countries, and the United Kingdom. He spearheaded civil service reforms, the relocation of IDF bases to the Negev and the accompanying civilian development plan for the region, the Housing Barriers Committee which released hundreds of thousands of housing units to the market, and the promotion of the establishment of two new seaports in Haifa and Ashdod. He also advanced the privatization and relocation of Israel Military Industries (IMI) to the south, a reform of Israel's dairy sector, and the food import reform, known as the Cornflakes Reform, through which Israel adopted the European model for food import regulation.

Locker brought the Zemach Committee recommendations on natural gas exports to government approval after years of delay and oversaw approval of the national master plan for natural gas absorption facilities. These decisions enabled continued development of the Leviathan gas field and the growth of Israel's natural gas industry.

He chaired the Committee for Reducing the Use of Cash, whose recommendations, later adopted by the government, imposed limits on cash transactions and encouraged the use of advanced electronic means of payment.

Locker also initiated and established the National Digital Israel Initiative and, in parallel, promoted the National Cyber Bureau, emphasizing the development of Israel's cyber industry as a key export sector. Both units were founded under the Prime Minister's Office during his tenure. He also promoted the National Fiber Optics Project, transferred the Government ICT Authority and the eGovernment unit to the Prime Minister's Office, and advanced the establishment of a Civil Defense Authority for Cyber. These actions accelerated Israel's digitization and cyber industries.

Following Operation Protective Edge (2014), Locker formulated two long-term socio-economic development plans for the Gaza Envelope and the Negev. The government approved these in September 2014, allocating 3 billion shekels - the largest and most comprehensive economic development plan ever implemented in the region - which led to positive migration and a doubling of the area's population.

Locker also led several additional key government decisions, including the establishment of the Strum Committee to increase banking competition, relocation of major IDF bases (Glilot, Tel Hashomer, Tzrifin, etc.) to the south to boost the southern economy and free up land for housing, promotion of Druze community economic development, and raising the minimum wage.

In November 2014, Locker announced his resignation from the Prime Minister's Office, officially leaving the position in July 2015.

=== Post-Government Career ===
After leaving government service, he founded the consulting and investment firm Pitkrai Investments Ltd, through which he advised Israeli firms and foreign funds from Japan, China, Switzerland, and the United Kingdom. He also served as a director in several Israeli and international private and publicly traded companies.

=== Chairman of Israel Aerospace Industries (IAI) ===
In September 2017, Locker was appointed Chairman of the Board of Israel Aerospace Industries (IAI) - Israel's largest defense and industrial company, one of the country's leading exporters, and among its largest high-tech enterprises. IAI invests approximately 3 billion shekels annually in R&D, employs about 16,000 workers (including some 6,000 engineers and 4,000 technicians), and as of March 2025 had annual revenues of approximately 4 billion USD.

Locker led a rapid and sweeping business turnaround, including a comprehensive organizational restructuring, merger of divisions and units, aggressive efficiency programs, and closure of plants and production lines. Within one year, the company turned to profitability and revenue growth after many years of heavy losses and debt arrangements.

Under his leadership, IAI achieved its best financial and business results since its founding: annual revenues surpassed 15 billion shekels, and the company recorded record profits in gross, operating, and net income. Its defense divisions reached high profitability levels for the first time, comparable to major global competitors. Despite the COVID-19 crisis, which severely impacted IAI's civil aviation division, that division achieved operating profitability for the first time in over a decade.

During his tenure, IAI achieved significant technological and defense milestones, winning four Israel Defense Prizes, launching the Beresheet lunar spacecraft and the Ofek 16 satellite, successfully conducting the Arrow 3 missile test in Alaska, developing the Arrow 4 missile, and expanding into new markets such as Germany and Japan, while strengthening its presence in Asia. The company's order backlog reached a record 13.2 billion USD.

=== Chairman of Paz Oil and Energy Company Ltd. ===
At the end of 2020, Locker was appointed Chairman of the Board of Paz Oil and Energy Company Ltd., a position he continues to hold.

He led a major strategic transformation turning Paz from a fossil-fuel company into a retail and energy enterprise.

As part of this shift, the company span off its Ashdod oil refinery, expanded its convenience and food retail operations through acquisitions and mergers of various food chains, established Paz CHARGE - Israel's largest fast-charging network for electric vehicles, and strengthened the Yellow app, one of Israel's largest digital wallets. The company also sold non-core real estate assets and divested its industrial subsidiary Pazkar. It officially changed its name from Paz Oil Company Ltd. to Paz Retail and Energy Ltd. Between 2021 and 2025, the company's adjusted share price rose by nearly 200%.

=== Voluntary and Public Activity ===
Locker served as Chairman of Alin Beit Noam, a leading Israeli organization for people with disabilities.
