= Gregory Francis Noonan =

American judge

Judge of the United States District Court for the Southern District of New York
- In office October 21, 1949 – May 1, 1964
- Appointed by: Harry S. Truman
- Preceded by: Seat established by 63 Stat. 493
- Succeeded by: Marvin E. Frankel

United States Attorney for the Southern District of New York Acting
- In office December 1938 – March 1939
- President: Franklin D. Roosevelt
- Preceded by: Lamar Hardy
- Succeeded by: John T. Cahill

Personal details
- Born: Gregory Francis Noonan; May 12, 1906 New York City, New York
- Died: May 1, 1964 (aged 57) New Rochelle, New York
- Education: Fordham University School of Law (LL.B.)

Gregory Francis Noonan (May 12, 1906 – May 1, 1964) was a United States district judge of the United States District Court for the Southern District of New York.

== Education and career ==
Born in New York City, New York, Noonan received a Bachelor of Laws from Fordham University School of Law in 1928. He was in private practice in New York City from 1928 to 1934. He was an Assistant United States Attorney of the Southern District of New York, Civil Division from 1934 to 1936. He was Chief of the Criminal Division of the United States Attorney's Office for the Southern District of New York from 1936 to 1938. He was Chief Assistant United States Attorney of the Southern District of New York in 1938. He was the acting United States Attorney for the Southern District of New York from December 1938 to March 1939. He was in private practice in New York City from 1939 to 1949.

== Federal judicial service ==
Noonan received a recess appointment from President Harry S. Truman on October 21, 1949, to the United States District Court for the Southern District of New York, to a new seat created by 63 Stat. 493. He was nominated to the same seat by President Truman on January 5, 1950. He was confirmed by the United States Senate on April 25, 1950, and received his commission on April 26, 1950. Noonan served in that capacity until his death of a heart ailment on May 1, 1964, at Montefiore New Rochelle Hospital in New Rochelle, New York.

== Sources ==
Legal offices
Preceded by Seat established by 63 Stat. 493	Judge of the United States District Court for the Southern District of New York; 1949–1964	Succeeded by Marvin E. Frankel
