= United States Attorney for the Southern District of New York =

Chief federal law enforcement officer in eight New York counties

U.S. Attorney's Office for the Southern District of New York
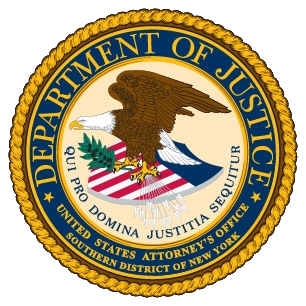

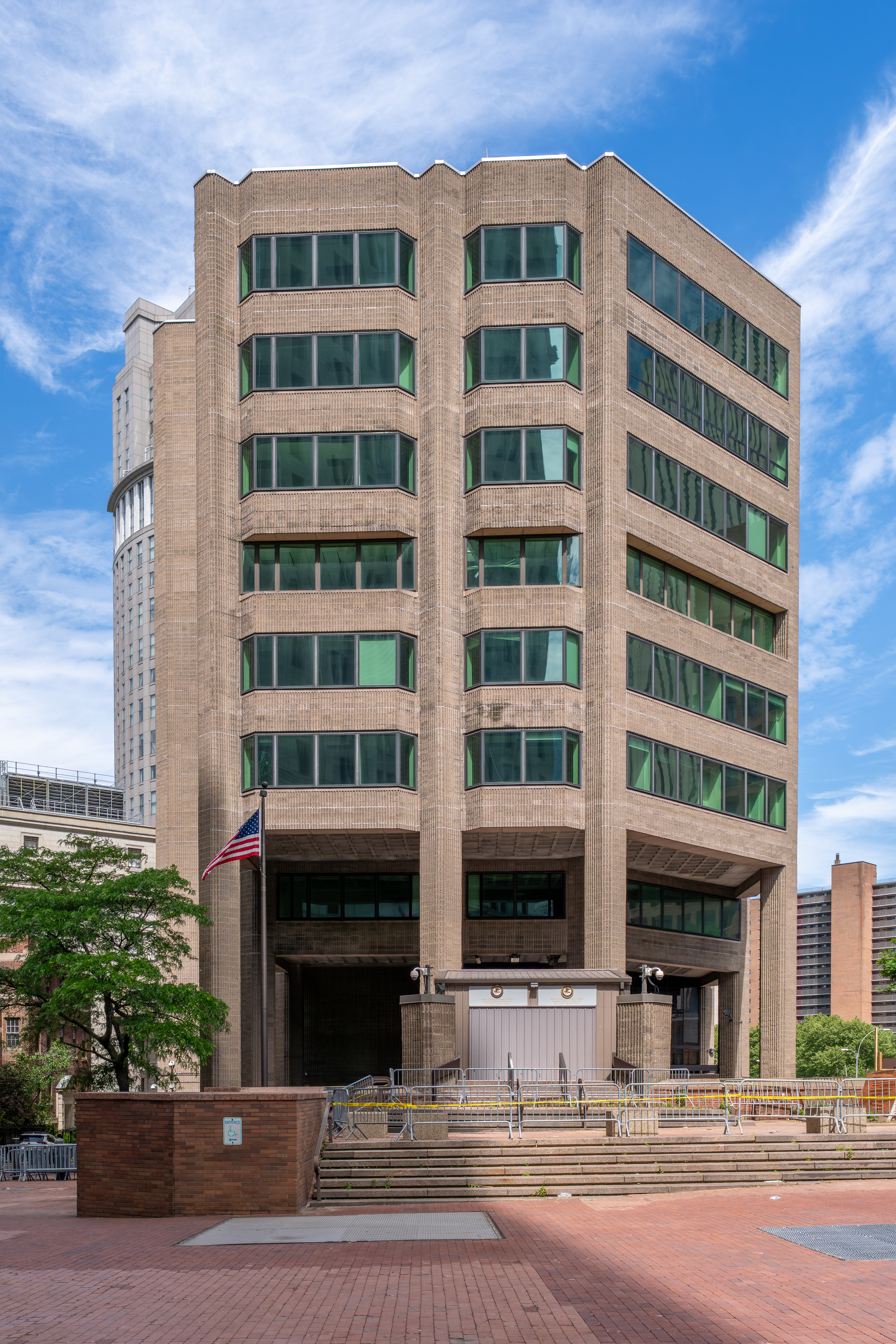
- Location in Civic Center, Manhattan (2026)

Department overview
- Formed: September 24, 1789 by the Judiciary Act of 1789
- Jurisdiction: Southern District of New York
- Headquarters: Manhattan, New York City, New York, U.S.
- Department executive: James M. McDonald, U.S. Attorney
- Parent Department: United States Department of Justice
- Website: justice.gov/usao-sdny

Map
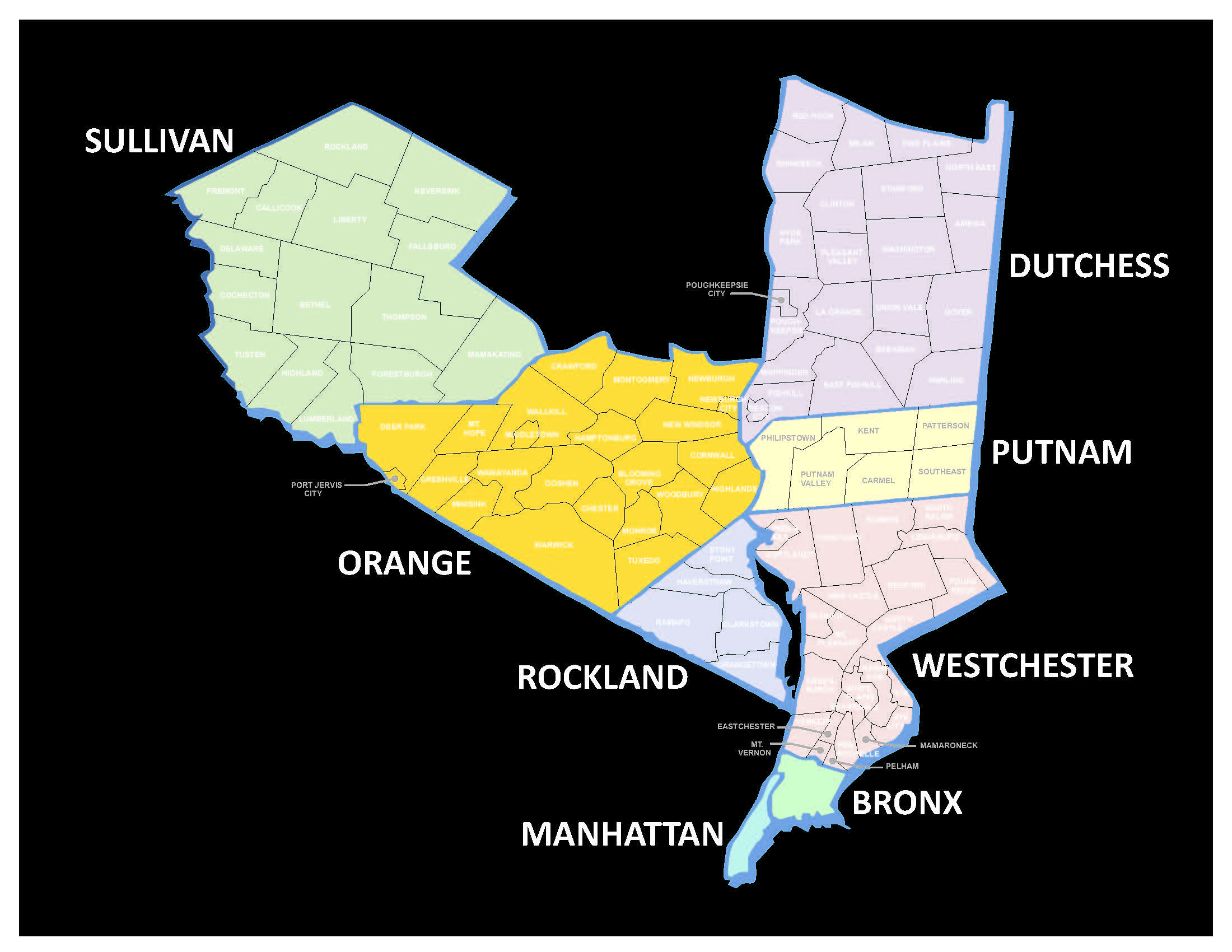
- Southern District of New York

The United States attorney for the Southern District of New York is the chief federal law enforcement officer in eight contiguous New York counties: the counties (coextensive boroughs of New York City) of New York (Manhattan) and Bronx, and the counties of Westchester, Putnam, Rockland, Orange, Dutchess, and Sullivan. Established by the Judiciary Act of 1789, the office represents the United States government in criminal and civil cases across the country. The SDNY handles a broad array of cases, including but not limited to those involving white collar crime, domestic terrorism, cybercrime, public corruption, organized crime, and civil rights disputes.

The Southern District has earned itself the moniker the "Sovereign District of New York". Its resources, culture, and accompanying FBI field office have given the SDNY a reputation for being exceptionally aggressive in its pursuit of criminals. Due to its jurisdiction over the New York City borough of Manhattan, the preeminent financial center of the United States of America, the office's incumbent is often nicknamed the "Sheriff of Wall Street".

== Organization ==
The office is organized into two divisions handling civil and criminal matters. The Southern District of New York also has two offices: in Manhattan and White Plains. The office employs approximately 220 assistant U.S. attorneys.

== List of U.S. attorneys ==
In 1814, the District of New York was divided into the Northern and the Southern District.

Term		U.S. Attorney	Party	Appointed by
1	April 1815 – July 1819	Jonathan Fisk	Democratic-Republican	James Madison
2	July 1819 – February 1828	Robert L. Tillotson	Democratic-Republican	James Monroe
3	February 1828 – April 1829	John Duer	Democratic-Republican	John Quincy Adams
4	April 1829 – April 1834	James A. Hamilton	Democratic	Andrew Jackson
5	April 1834 – December 10, 1838	William M. Price	Democratic	Andrew Jackson
6	December 1838 – March 1841	Benjamin F. Butler	Democratic	Martin Van Buren
7	March 1841 – March 1845	Ogden Hoffman	Whig	William Henry Harrison
8	March 1845 – September 1848	Benjamin F. Butler	Democratic	James Polk
9	September 1848 – December 1848	Charles McVean	Democratic	James Polk
10	January 1849 – April 1849	Lorenzo B. Shepard	Democratic	James Polk
11	April 1849 – March 1853	Jonathan Prescott Hall	Whig	Zachary Taylor
12	April 1853 – June 1854	Charles O'Conor	Democratic	Franklin Pierce
13	July 1854 – January 1858	John McKeon	Democratic	Franklin Pierce
14	January 1858 – December 1859	Theodore Sedgwick	Democratic	James Buchanan
15	December 1859 – March 1861	James I. Roosevelt	Democratic	James Buchanan
16	April 1861 – April 1865	Edward Delafield Smith	Republican	Abraham Lincoln
17	April 1865 – April 12, 1866	Daniel S. Dickinson	Democratic	Abraham Lincoln
18	April 1866 – April 25, 1869	Samuel G. Courtney	Democratic	Andrew Johnson
19	April 25, 1869 – July 20, 1870	Edwards Pierrepont	Republican	Ulysses S. Grant
20	July 20, 1870 – December 31, 1872	Noah Davis	Republican	Ulysses S. Grant
21	December 31, 1872 – January 24, 1877	George Bliss Jr.	Republican	Ulysses S. Grant
22	January 24, 1877 – March 12, 1883	Stewart L. Woodford	Republican	Ulysses S. Grant
23	March 12, 1883 – July 6, 1885	Elihu Root	Republican	Chester A. Arthur
24	July 6, 1885 – March 1, 1886	William Dorsheimer	Democratic	Grover Cleveland
25	March 1, 1886 – September 16, 1889	Stephen A. Walker	Democratic	Grover Cleveland
26	September 16, 1889 – February 1, 1894	Edward Mitchell	Republican	Benjamin Harrison
	February 1, 1894 – July 23, 1894	Henry C. Platt (Note: Henry C. Platt served as Acting U.S. Attorney during the vacancy)	Democratic	Grover Cleveland
27	July 23, 1894 – January 1898	Wallace Macfarlane	Democratic	Grover Cleveland
28	January 1898 – January 1906	Henry Lawrence Burnett	Republican	William McKinley
29	January 1906 – April 8, 1909	Henry L. Stimson	Republican	Theodore Roosevelt
30	April 8, 1909 – May 7, 1913	Henry A. Wise	Republican	William Howard Taft
31	May 7, 1913 – April 1917	Hudson Snowden Marshall	Democratic	Woodrow Wilson
32	April 1917 – June 1921	Francis Gordon Caffey	Democratic	Woodrow Wilson
33	June 1921 – March 2, 1925	William Hayward	Republican	Warren Harding
34	March 2, 1925 – April 6, 1927	Emory Buckner	Republican	Calvin Coolidge
35	April 6, 1927 – September 29, 1930	Charles H. Tuttle	Republican	Calvin Coolidge
	September 29, 1930 – January 1931	Robert E. Manley (Note: Robert E. Manley served as Acting U.S. Attorney during the vacancy)	Republican	Herbert Hoover
36	January 1931 – November 21, 1933	George Z. Medalie	Republican	Herbert Hoover
	November 22, 1933 – December 26, 1933	Thomas E. Dewey (Note: Thomas E. Dewey served as Acting U.S. Attorney during the vacancy)	Republican	Franklin D. Roosevelt
37	December 26, 1933 – May 16, 1935	Martin Thomas Conboy Jr.	Democratic	Franklin D. Roosevelt
	May 16, 1935 – November 20, 1935	Francis W. H. Adams (Note: Francis W. H. Adams served as Acting U.S. Attorney during the vacancy)	Democratic	Franklin D. Roosevelt
38	November 20, 1935 – December 1938	Lamar Hardy	Democratic	Franklin D. Roosevelt
	December 1938 – March 1939	Gregory Francis Noonan (Note: Gregory Francis Noonan served as Acting U.S. Attorney during the vacancy)	Democratic	Franklin D. Roosevelt
39	March 1939 – March 1941	John T. Cahill	Democratic	Franklin D. Roosevelt
40	March 1941 (Note: Correa served as Acting U.S. Attorney from March to July 1941 before official confirmation to the post.) – June 10, 1943	Mathias F. Correa	Democratic	Franklin D. Roosevelt
	June 10, 1943 – August 2, 1943	Howard F. Corcoran (Note: Howard F. Corcoran served as Acting U.S. Attorney during the vacancy)	Democratic	Franklin D. Roosevelt
41	August 2, 1943 – October 9, 1944	James B. M. McNally	Democratic	Franklin D. Roosevelt
42	October 9, 1944 (Note: McGohey served as Acting U.S. Attorney from October 9, 1944, to January 1945 before official confirmation to the post.) – October 1949	John F. X. McGohey	Democratic	Franklin D. Roosevelt
43	October 1949 (Note: Saypol served as Acting U.S. Attorney from October 1949 to April 13, 1950, before official confirmation to the post.) – September 18, 1951	Irving Saypol	Democratic	Harry S. Truman
44	September 18, 1951 – April 1, 1953	Myles J. Lane	Democratic	Harry S. Truman
45	April 1, 1953 – July 11, 1955	J. Edward Lumbard	Republican	Dwight D. Eisenhower
	July 11, 1955 – September 1, 1955	Lloyd F. MacMahon (Note: Lloyd F. McMahon served as interim U.S. Attorney during the vacancy)	Republican	Dwight D. Eisenhower
46	September 1, 1955 – July 9, 1958	Paul W. Williams	Republican	Dwight D. Eisenhower
	July 9, 1958 – 1959	Arthur H. Christy (Note: Arthur H. Christy served as Acting U.S. Attorney during the vacancy)	Republican	Dwight D. Eisenhower
47	1959 – January 31, 1961	Samuel Hazard Gillespie Jr.	Republican	Dwight D. Eisenhower
	January 31, 1961 – April 18, 1961	Morton S. Robson (Note: Morton S. Robson served as Acting U.S. Attorney during the vacancy)	Republican	John F. Kennedy
48 (Note: From September 6 to November 20, 1962, Morgenthau resigned his position to run for Governor of New York. After he was defeated, John F. Kennedy re-appointed him as U.S. Attorney. In the interim, Vincent Lyons Broderick served as acting U.S. Attorney from September 5 to November 20, 1962.)	April 18, 1961 – January 16, 1970	Robert Morgenthau	Democratic	John F. Kennedy
49	January 16, 1970 – June 4, 1973	Whitney North Seymour Jr.	Republican	Richard Nixon
50	June 4, 1973 – October 31, 1975	Paul J. Curran	Republican	Richard Nixon
	October 31, 1975 – March 1, 1976	Thomas J. Cahill (Note: Thomas J. Cahill served as Acting U.S. Attorney during the vacancy)	Republican	Gerald Ford
51	March 1, 1976 – March 2, 1980	Robert B. Fiske	Republican	Gerald Ford
	March 3, 1980 – May 21, 1980	William M. Tendy (Note: William M. Tendy served as Acting U.S. Attorney during the vacancy)	Republican	Jimmy Carter
52	May 22, 1980 – June 3, 1983	John S. Martin Jr.	Democratic	Jimmy Carter
53	June 3, 1983 – January 1, 1989	Rudy Giuliani	Republican	Ronald Reagan
	January 1, 1989 – October 16, 1989	Benito Romano (Note: Benito Romano served as Acting U.S. Attorney during the vacancy)	Republican	George H. W. Bush
54	October 16, 1989 – May 31, 1993	Otto G. Obermaier	Republican	George H. W. Bush
55	June 1, 1993 – January 7, 2002	Mary Jo White	Unaffiliated	Bill Clinton
56	January 7, 2002 – December 15, 2003	James Comey	Republican	George W. Bush
	December 15, 2003 – September 6, 2005	David N. Kelley (Note: David N. Kelley served as interim U.S. Attorney during the vacancy)	Democratic	George W. Bush
57	September 6, 2005 – December 1, 2008	Michael J. Garcia	Republican	George W. Bush
	December 1, 2008 – August 13, 2009	Lev Dassin (Note: Lev Dassin served as Acting U.S. Attorney during the vacancy)	Unaffiliated	George W. Bush
58	August 13, 2009 – March 11, 2017	Preet Bharara	Democratic	Barack Obama
	March 11, 2017 – January 5, 2018	Joon Kim (Note: Joon Kim served as Acting U.S. Attorney during the vacancy)	[data missing]	Donald Trump
	January 5, 2018 – June 20, 2020	Geoffrey Berman (Note: Geoffrey Berman served as Interim U.S. Attorney from January 5 to April 25, 2018 and as court-appointed U.S. Attorney from April 25, 2018, to June 20, 2020)	Republican	Donald Trump
	June 20, 2020 – October 10, 2021	Audrey Strauss (Note: Audrey Strauss served as Acting U.S. Attorney from June 20, 2020, until she was court-appointed U.S. Attorney on January 16, 2021)	Democratic	Donald Trump
59	October 10, 2021 – December 13, 2024	Damian Williams	Democratic	Joe Biden
	December 13, 2024 – January 20, 2025	Edward Kim (Note: Edward Kim served as Acting U.S. Attorney during the vacancy)		Joe Biden
	January 21, 2025 – February 13, 2025	Danielle Sassoon (Note: Daniel Sassoon served as Interim U.S. Attorney during the vacancy)	Republican	Donald Trump
	February 13, 2025 - April 16, 2025	Matthew Podolsky (Note: Matthew Podolosky served as Acting U.S. Attorney during the vacancy)		Donald Trump
	April 16, 2025 - July 29, 2026	Jay Clayton (Note: Jay Clayton served as Interim U.S. Attorney from April 16, 2025, until he was the court-appointed U.S. Attorney on August 19, 2025)	Independent	Donald Trump
	July 29, 2026 - Present	Jamie McDonald (Note: Jamie McDonald was initially announced as the Interim U.S. Attorney, but took office as the court-appointed U.S. Attorney on July 29, 2026)		Donald Trump

== Notable assistants ==
- Michael F. Armstrong, lawyer
- Bob Arum, boxing promoter
- Debra A. Livingston, lawyer and judge
- Neil Barofsky, special inspector general overseeing the Troubled Asset Relief Program
- Bernard Bell, professor at Rutgers School of Law–Newark
- Maurene Comey, daughter of former FBI Director James Comey
- Thomas E. Dewey, Governor of New York and the unsuccessful Republican candidate for President in 1944 and 1948
- Eddie Eagan, former Olympic athlete
- Louis Freeh, former director of the Federal Bureau of Investigation
- Patrick Fitzgerald, United States Attorney for the Northern District of Illinois
- Felix Frankfurter, Associate Justice of the Supreme Court of the United States
- John Marshall Harlan II, associate justice, Supreme Court of the United States
- Elie Honig, lawyer and CNN Senior Legal Analyst
- Arthur L. Liman, criminal defense attorney
- Robert J. McGuire, former New York City Police Commissioner
- Michael Mukasey, former United States Attorney General
- Thomas Francis Murphy, federal prosecutor and judge in New York City; prosecutor in the two perjury trials of Alger Hiss
- Mary Grace Quackenbos, first woman to hold this post in the United States
- Charles Rangel, U.S. Representative from Harlem
- Henry Dwight Sedgwick, lawyer and author
- Franklin A. Thomas, former director of the Ford Foundation
- Maya Wiley (born 1964), civil rights activist and lawyer, 2021 mayoral candidate for New York City

== In popular culture ==
=== Television ===
The Showtime drama series Billions is loosely based on Preet Bharara's prosecution of SAC Capital and other hedge funds.

The ABC legal drama For the People depicts new defense attorneys and prosecutors working in the Southern District of New York.

The 2020 Netflix series Fear City: New York vs the Mafia documents the work of the FBI and the Southern District of New York against the Five Families of the Italian American Mafia in the 1980s.
