= Judge Kirkland =

Judge Kirkland may refer to:

- Alfred Younges Kirkland Sr. (1917–2004), judge of the United States District Court for the Northern District of Illinois
- James Robert Kirkland (1903–1958), judge of the United States District Court for the District of Columbia
