= Emmet G. Sullivan =

American judge (born 1947)

Emmet Sullivan
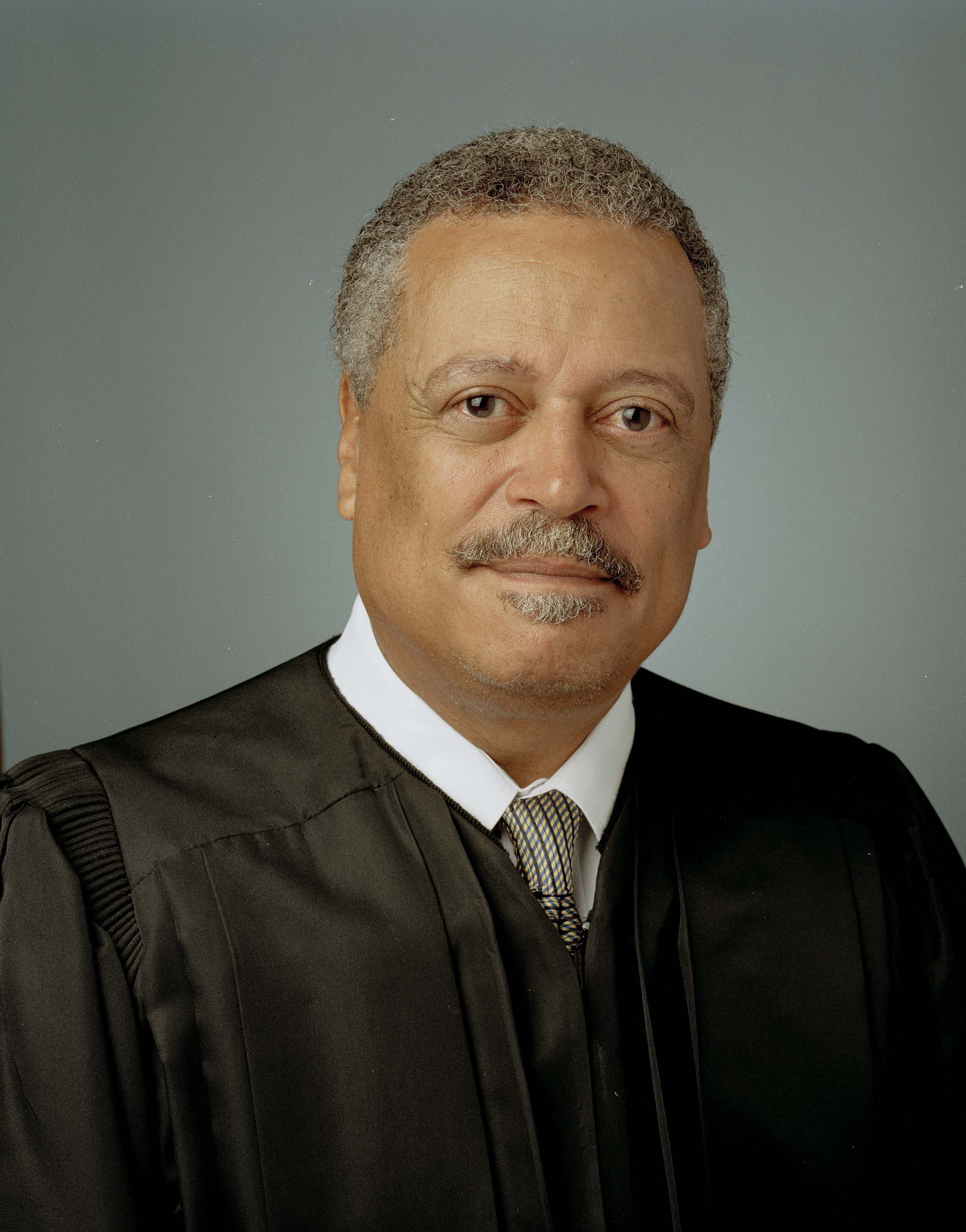

Senior Judge of the United States District Court for the District of Columbia
- Incumbent
- Assumed office April 3, 2021

Judge of the United States District Court for the District of Columbia
- In office June 16, 1994 – April 3, 2021
- Appointed by: Bill Clinton
- Preceded by: Louis F. Oberdorfer
- Succeeded by: Jia M. Cobb

Associate Judge of the District of Columbia Court of Appeals
- In office 1992–1994
- Appointed by: George H. W. Bush
- Preceded by: James A. Belson
- Succeeded by: Inez Smith Reid

Judge of the Superior Court of the District of Columbia
- In office 1984–1992
- Appointed by: Ronald Reagan
- Preceded by: Position created
- Succeeded by: Brook Hedge

Personal details
- Born: Emmet Gael Sullivan; June 4, 1947 (age 79) Washington, D.C., U.S.
- Education: Howard University (BA, JD)

Emmet Gael Sullivan (born June 4, 1947) is an American attorney and jurist serving as a senior United States district judge of the United States District Court for the District of Columbia.

He earned his undergraduate and law degrees from Howard University. He worked in private practice for more than a decade at Houston & Gardner, becoming a name partner in 1980. He was appointed to the Superior Court of the District of Columbia in 1984 by President Ronald Reagan, to the District of Columbia Court of Appeals as an Associate Judge in 1992 by President George H. W. Bush, and to the federal bench in 1994 by President Bill Clinton.

== Early life ==
Sullivan was born in Washington, D.C., in 1947 and attended local schools. He graduated from McKinley Technology High School in 1964. In 1968, he received a Bachelor of Arts degree in political science from Howard University, a historically black university, and in 1971 a Juris Doctor from the Howard University School of Law.

== Career ==
Upon graduation from law school, Sullivan received a Reginald Heber Smith Fellowship in poverty law from the University of Pennsylvania. He was assigned to the Neighborhood Legal Services Program in Washington, D.C., where he worked for one year. The following year, he served as a law clerk to Superior Court Judge James A. Washington Jr., a former professor and dean of Howard University School of Law.

In 1973, Sullivan joined the law firm of Houston & Gardner, co-founded by Charles Hamilton Houston, who had expanded Howard University Law School as its dean, and led litigation for the NAACP to overturn racially restrictive laws. Sullivan became a partner and was actively engaged in the general practice of law with that firm.

In August 1980, his partner, William C. Gardner, was appointed as an Associate Judge of the Superior Court of the District of Columbia. Sullivan was a name partner in the successor firm of Houston, Sullivan & Gardner. He also taught as an adjunct professor at the Howard University School of Law and has served as a member of the visiting faculty at Harvard Law School's Trial Advocacy Workshop.

Sullivan was appointed by President Reagan to the Superior Court of the District of Columbia on October 3, 1984. On November 25, 1991, Sullivan was appointed by President George H. W. Bush to serve as an Associate Judge of the District of Columbia Court of Appeals.

=== Federal judicial service ===
Sullivan was nominated by President Bill Clinton on March 22, 1994, to a seat on the United States District Court for the District of Columbia vacated by Judge Louis F. Oberdorfer. He was confirmed by the United States Senate on June 15, 1994, and received his commission on June 16, 1994. Sullivan assumed senior status on April 3, 2021.

=== Notable cases ===
Sullivan presided over a number of habeas corpus petitions in the early 21st century submitted on behalf of men detained by the United States military at the Guantanamo Bay detention camp as part of President George W. Bush's response to the 9/11 attacks of terrorism.

Sullivan presided over the 2008 trial of U.S. Senator Ted Stevens, who was convicted of seven felony ethics violations in October. During the trial, the judge refused requests by the defense for a mistrial to be declared, after information was revealed that the prosecution had withheld exculpatory Brady material. Eight days after the guilty verdict, Stevens narrowly lost his reelection bid. As more evidence of prosecutorial misconduct became known in early 2009, Judge Sullivan held four prosecutors in civil contempt of court. On April 1, 2009, following a Justice Department probe that found additional evidence of prosecutorial misconduct, the Department of Justice recommended that Stevens' conviction be dismissed. On April 7, 2009, Sullivan set aside the conviction and appointed a lawyer to investigate the prosecution team for criminal contempt. Subsequently, one of the four prosecutors held in contempt committed suicide. Ultimately, Sullivan dismissed the civil contempt charges, and no additional charges were brought against the three surviving prosecutors.

In 2014, Sullivan was presiding over a case, Judicial Watch v. IRS, related to an ongoing investigation into the 2013 IRS controversy. There was a fruitless attempt to determine where the deleted emails of former IRS employee Lois Lerner had gone, what damage to her computer hard drive occurred, and what steps the IRS had taken to recover the information contained in the emails and on the hard drive.

In 2015, Sullivan presided over a FOIA lawsuit involving the matter of Hillary Clinton's private email use while Secretary of State.

According to the American Civil Liberties Union (ACLU), a woman and her child fled domestic abuse in El Salvador to seek asylum in the U.S. However, the mother was removed from her detention facility and likely put on a plane on August 9, 2018, despite Justice Department promises that she and others would not be deported before the judge could rule on their cases. Sullivan demanded, "Turn that plane around." He threatened to hold those responsible for the removal in contempt of court, starting with Attorney General Jeff Sessions, if the situation was not rectified. A Department of Homeland Security official stated, "We are complying with the court's requests...the plaintiffs will not disembark and will be promptly returned to the United States."

==== Blumenthal v Trump ====
Judge Sullivan presided over a lawsuit involving President Trump, which challenged payments by foreign governments to Trump-owned hotels. Sullivan granted in part and denied in part the Trump team's motion to dismiss for lack of standing; denied the motion to dismiss for failure to state claim; and certified interlocutory appeal. On February 7, 2020, in a per curiam decision, the United States Court of Appeals for the District of Columbia Circuit held that individual members of Congress lacked standing to bring action against the president. The court, finding in favor of Trump, reversed and remanded Sullivan's holding that the members of Congress had standing to sue and instructed him to dismiss the complaint.

==== US v Flynn ====
The case of United States of America v. Michael T. Flynn, the former national security adviser to Donald Trump, was randomly assigned to District Court Judge Rudolph Contreras. On December 1, 2017, Flynn and special counsel Robert Mueller agreed to a plea bargain in the D.C. court. In the plea bargain, Flynn admitted to one count of lying to the FBI and said he was cooperating with the Mueller investigation. On December 7, Contreras recused himself from the case, which was randomly reassigned to Sullivan. After questioning Flynn about his reasons for pleading guilty, Sullivan accepted Flynn's guilty plea. Sullivan deferred sentencing Flynn several times because prosecutors indicated he was still cooperating with their investigation.

In June 2019 Flynn changed attorneys, retaining controversial Texas attorney Sidney Powell to head his legal team, and began to assert that investigators and prosecutors had acted improperly. On December 16, 2019, Sullivan rejected Flynn's claims of entrapment by the FBI and malfeasance by prosecutors, and set sentencing for January 28, 2020. On January 14, 2020, Flynn filed a motion to withdraw his guilty plea "because of the government's bad faith, vindictiveness, and breach of the plea agreement." On January 16, Sullivan postponed Flynn's sentencing date to February 27.

On May 7, 2020, the Department of Justice (DOJ) said it would move to drop all charges against Flynn. It was left to Sullivan to determine whether to dismiss the charges and, if so, whether to do it "with prejudice" to prevent a retrial. On May 11, 2020, former federal judge and prosecutor John Gleeson co-authored with other former law enforcement officials an op-ed encouraging Judge Sullivan to scrutinize the DOJ's motion. On May 12, Sullivan announced that he would place a hold on the DOJ's move to drop charges against Flynn, and would consider a hearing involving "friend of the court" (amicus curiae) input from outside parties with interests and perspectives. On May 13, Sullivan appointed Gleeson as amicus to formally oppose the DOJ's attempt to drop charges, and to look into whether Flynn had committed perjury when he twice told the court under oath that he was guilty. Sullivan said "at the appropriate time" he would set a schedule for outside parties to argue against the DOJ's claims as it moves to drop the charges.

On May 19, Flynn's post-conviction attorney Powell filed a writ of mandamus appeal with the D.C. Circuit Court of Appeals, asking that Sullivan be ordered to drop the charges, challenging his decision to appoint Gleeson, and asking that he be removed from the case. On May 21, citing US v Fokker Servs, BV, 818 F.3d 733 (DC Cir 2016), the D.C. Circuit ordered Sullivan to respond to the writ of mandamus by June 1, 2020, and invited the government to respond within the same 10-day period. On June 1, as part of his response, Sullivan argued that the Fokker decision does not apply because it did not consider a situation where the defendant pleaded guilty twice and the prosecutor changed course; Sullivan moved to dismiss. Oral arguments before a D.C. Circuit Court of Appeals panel were held on June 12, 2020. Sullivan was next due to hear the case on July 16, 2020.

On June 24, 2020, in a 2-1 decision, the D.C. Circuit Court of Appeals panel granted Flynn's petition for a writ of mandamus, ordering Judge Sullivan to dismiss the case. "In this case, the district court's actions will result in specific harms to the exercise of the Executive Branch's exclusive prosecutorial power. The contemplated proceedings would likely require the Executive to reveal the internal deliberative process behind its exercise of prosecutorial discretion, interfering with the Article II charging authority." The decision also vacated Judge Sullivan's amicus appointment on mootness grounds. In response to the higher court ruling, Judge Sullivan issued an order canceling the July 16 hearing date but did not address the DOJ's motion further. Judge Sullivan's options were either to request the full appellate court to review the case or to grant the DOJ's motion to dismiss the charges in accordance with the writ of mandamus.

On July 9, Judge Sullivan asked the entire U.S. Court of Appeals for the District of Columbia Circuit to review the June 24 decision, saying the panel's decision represented a "dramatic break from precedent". On July 20, 2020, Flynn filed his response to Judge Sullivan's request for the full court to review the panel decision to order the criminal charges dismissed. By Order dated July 30, 2020, the full court granted Judge Sullivan's request and scheduled oral argument for August 11, 2020. In addition to vacating the June 24, 2020 panel decision, the Order directs all parties to be prepared to "address whether there are 'no other adequate means to attain the relief' desired" (citation omitted). On August 11, the full appeals court heard arguments from the DOJ and from Flynn's attorney. On August 31, the appeals court declined to order dismissal of Flynn's prosecution. In an en banc hearing, eight of the D.C. Circuit judges ruled in favor of allowing Sullivan to adjudicate the case. Only the two judges who ruled in favor of Flynn in June 2020, appointed by Presidents George W. Bush and Donald Trump ruled against the decision. In their dissent, they reversed their earlier position that the case should not be taken from Sullivan and assigned to another judge.

On November 25, 2020, Trump issued Flynn a full presidential pardon. On December 8, 2020, Judge Sullivan dismissed the case as moot because of the presidential pardon. In his 43-page opinion he commented that the pardon was "extraordinarily broad", noted that such a pardon does not render the recipient "innocent", and pointed out that acceptance of a pardon implies an admission of guilt.

A man who left a graphic death threat on Sullivan's voicemail during the Flynn proceeding was sentenced in July 2021 to 18 months in prison.

==== Post Office ====
On October 28, 2020, Sullivan ordered USPS to lift limits on extra trips and overtime leading up to Election Day. He also ordered the Postal Service to update him on the number of trips occurring each day at a national, regional, and local level. On November 3, Sullivan ordered the USPS to "sweep its facilities" in crucial swing states by 3 p.m. that day. The USPS failed to meet the deadline. After the USPS failure to comply with the court-ordered ballot sweep, Sullivan ordered Postmaster General Louis DeJoy to appear in court. Sullivan has also ordered the Postal Service to sweep their facilities for ballots twice a day in states with extended deadlines. At a post-election hearing in early November, Sullivan said that DeJoy "is either going to have to be deposed or appear before me and testify under oath about why some measures were not taken."

==== Title 42 ====
On November 15, 2022, Sullivan ruled that Title 42 expulsion, a tool used by presidents Donald Trump and Joe Biden to forbid asylum seekers from remaining in the United States was a violation of the Administrative Procedure Act, noting that the Title was an "arbitrary and capricious" violation of the Act. The ruling required the United States government to process all asylum seekers under immigrant law as previous to Title 42's implementation, and Sullivan specifically called out the CDC for intentionally ignoring the negative effects that Title 42 would bring about, as well as failing to allow migrants to reside with legal US residents. The ruling was celebrated by the ACLU, the plaintiff in the case.

== See also ==
- List of African-American federal judges
- List of African-American jurists

Legal offices
Preceded by James A. Belson	Associate Judge of the District of Columbia Court of Appeals; 1991–1994	Succeeded by Inez Smith Reid
Preceded by Louis F. Oberdorfer	Judge of the United States District Court for the District of Columbia; 1994–2021	Succeeded by Jia M. Cobb
