= James Robertson (judge) =

American judge (1938–2019)

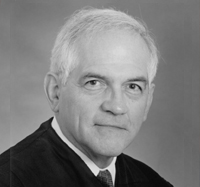

Senior Judge of the United States District Court for the District of Columbia
- In office December 31, 2008 – June 1, 2010

Judge of the United States District Court for the District of Columbia
- In office October 11, 1994 – December 31, 2008
- Appointed by: Bill Clinton
- Preceded by: George Hughes Revercomb
- Succeeded by: Robert L. Wilkins

Personal details
- Born: May 18, 1938 Cleveland, Ohio
- Died: September 7, 2019 (aged 81) Washington, D.C.
- Spouse: Berit Persson (m. 1959)
- Education: Princeton University (B.A.); George Washington University Law School (LL.B.)

James Robertson (May 18, 1938 – September 7, 2019) was a United States district judge of the United States District Court for the District of Columbia from 1994 until his retirement in June 2010. Robertson also served on the Foreign Intelligence Surveillance Court from 2002 until December 2005, when he resigned from that court in protest against warrantless wiretapping.

== Early life, education, and Navy service ==
Robertson was born in Cleveland, Ohio, on May 18, 1938; his father was a banker, his mother a social worker. Robertson had a twin sister (Ellen) and an older sister (Martha). He was raised in Oberlin, Ohio, and Dayton, Ohio. He attended his freshman year of high school in the public schools and then transferred to Western Reserve Academy in Hudson, Ohio. He received a B.A. cum laude from Princeton University in 1959, on a Navy ROTC scholarship. Robertson was a member of the American Whig–Cliosophic Society at Princeton, and editor of the university's humor magazine, The Tiger.

Robertson served in the United States Navy from 1959 to 1964, achieving the rank of lieutenant. He served on a radar picket destroyer with a home port in Jacksonville, Florida, first in the position of deck officer, then as anti-submarine warfare officer, and then as gunnery officer. Robertson spent his last two years in the navy on desk duty at the Office of Naval Intelligence at The Pentagon and simultaneously attended the George Washington University Law School as a night student. After leaving the navy, he finished his third year as a day student, and was editor-in-chief of The George Washington Law Review. He received his LL.B in 1965.

== Legal career ==
With the exception of a three-year gap from 1969 to 1972, Robertson was in private practice in Washington, D.C., from 1965 to 1994 at the law firm of Wilmer, Cutler & Pickering. While at Wilmer, Cutler & Pickering, Robertson worked under Louis F. Oberdorfer and later represented the Automobile Manufacturers Association in connection with the development of Federal Motor Vehicle Safety Standards. From 1969 to 1972, when Robertson served with the Lawyers' Committee for Civil Rights Under Law, as chief counsel at the organization's offices in Jackson, Mississippi (1969–1970) and as national director in Washington, D.C. (1970–1972).

He became a partner at Wilmer, Cutler & Pickering in 1973. While in private practice, he served as president of the District of Columbia Bar (1991–1992), and president of the Southern Africa Legal Services and Legal Education Project (1989–1994).

== Federal judicial service ==
=== Appointment and confirmation ===
On September 14, 1994, Robertson was nominated by President Bill Clinton to a seat on the United States District Court for the District of Columbia vacated by George Hughes Revercomb. The American Bar Association's Standing Committee on the Federal Judiciary, which rates judicial nominees, unanimously rated Robertson as "well qualified" (the committee's highest rating). Robertson was confirmed by the United States Senate on October 7, 1994, by voice vote. He received his commission four days later.

=== Resignation from FISA Court ===
Chief Justice William Rehnquist appointed Robertson to the Foreign Intelligence Surveillance Court (FISA Court) on May 19, 2002. On December 20, 2005, Robertson resigned from the FISA court, sending a letter to Chief Justice John G. Roberts announcing his resignation. His resignation was in protest against the NSA warrantless surveillance that had occurred outside the FISA statute, a program revealed by The New York Times one week before Robertson's resignation. In 2013, following his retirement from the judiciary, Robertson testified before the Privacy and Civil Liberties Oversight Board (PCLOB) and said that he had resigned in protest of the George W. Bush administration's warrantless wiretaps, which bypassed the FISA Court. Robertson also criticized the 2008 amendments to the Foreign Intelligence Surveillance Act, in which Congress allowed the FISA Court to approve collection of data in bulk, in addition to warrants targeted at individuals. In Robertson's view, this change "turned the FISA court into something like an administrative agency, which makes and approves rules for others to follow," which he viewed as not being a proper role for the judiciary.

Robertson was an early and prominent advocate of the need for an institutional adversary process within the FISA Court, to allow FISA judges to hear arguments from counsel other than the government's counsel. In an oral history, Robertson said:

In the exercise of its quotidian warrant-issuing function, the FISA Court acts like a magistrate judge. Everything is ex parte, and there is no reason, no occasion, to have a defense lawyer there arguing that the warrant should not be issued. But when the FISA court is asked, as it was after the enactment of the Patriot Act, to approve not only individual warrants but also surveillance programs that would be carried on without a warrant, then the FISA Court was acting I thought like a court reviewing the work of an administrative agency. And when courts review the work of administrative agencies, they do it in an adversary context with somebody arguing the other side. I said to the PCLOB that a judge who hears one side of an argument may think that’s a pretty good argument until he hears the other side of the argument. Our system depends entirely on somebody pushing back and arguing the other side of any proposition. And I said that without that, courts are going to make mistakes.

A compromise provision in the 2015 USA Freedom Act adopted a form of adversary process within the FISA Court, allowing the court's judges to call upon a panel of attorneys as amicus curiae to offer adversary views; Robertson viewed this reform as a sufficient process to satisfy adversaries.

=== Notable rulings ===
Notable rulings by Robertson include:

- Hamdan v. Rumsfeld: Yemeni prisoner Salim Ahmed Hamdan, a chauffeur for Osama bin Laden, was imprisoned by the U.S. military at Guantanamo Bay detainment camp without charge. A military tribunal declared Hamdan an enemy combatant. Hamdan sought a writ of habeas corpus. Robertson ruled in favor of Hamdan's favor, finding that the United States could not hold a military commission unless it was first shown that the detainee was not a prisoner of war. The U.S. Supreme Court upheld Robertson's ruling in 2006.
- United States v. Hubbell: In 1998, Robertson dismissed the indictment of Webster L. Hubbell on tax evasion charges. Robertson held that independent counsel Kenneth W. Starr exceeded his authority by charging Hubbell, and criticized Starr for going on a "quintessential fishing expedition."
- American Council of the Blind v. Snow: In 2006, Robertson ruled in favor of the American Council of the Blind, holding that the U.S. Department of the Treasury's "failure to design and issue paper currency that is readily distinguishable to blind and visually impaired individuals violates section 504 of the Rehabilitation Act." Robertson noted that "Of the more than 180 countries that issue paper currency, only the United States prints bills that are identical in size and color in all their denominations." The decision was affirmed by the D.C. Circuit on appeal.
- Schroer v. Billington: In a suit brought by a transgender employee against the Library of Congress, Robertson ruled in 2006 that employment discrimination against transgender persons may violate Title VII's prohibition on discrimination "because of ... sex." In 2008, following a trial, Robertson ruled that the employee's civil rights were violated.

== Retirement and death ==
After serving for 14 years, Robertson assumed senior status on the District Court on December 31, 2008; he fully retired on June 1, 2010. After retiring from the bench, Robertson became a mediator and arbitrator with JAMS, deciding complex commercial cases. He also wrote two op-eds published in the Washington Post.

Robertson died on September 7, 2019, at age 81, in Washington, D.C., due to heart disease.

== Personal life ==
Robertson married Berit Persson in 1959; they had three children and six grandchildren.

Robertson lived in North Bethesda, Maryland, and later Georgetown.

Legal offices
Preceded by George Hughes Revercomb	Judge of the United States District Court for the District of Columbia; 1994–2008	Succeeded by Robert L. Wilkins
