= Rupert Richardson =

American civil rights activist

President of the NAACP
- In office 1992–1996
- Preceded by: Hazel N. Dukes
- Succeeded by: Kweisi Mfume

Personal details
- Born: Rupert Florence Richardson; January 14, 1930 Navasota, Texas, U.S.
- Died: January 24, 2008 (aged 78) Baton Rouge, Louisiana, U.S.
- Relatives: Norma Holloway Johnson (cousin)
- Education: Southern University (BS); McNeese State University (MC, PsyM)

Rupert Florence Richardson (January 14, 1930 – January 24, 2008) was an American civil rights activist and civil rights leader who served as the national president of the National Association for the Advancement of Colored People (NAACP) from 1992 to 1995, and as the national president emeritus of the NAACP following her term as president. She also worked in the Louisiana state government for 30 years.

== Early and personal life ==
Rupert Florence Richardson was born on January 14, 1930, in Navasota, Texas, to Albert S. Richardson and Mary Samuels Richardson. She was raised in Lake Charles, Louisiana, where her family moved to shortly after her birth, and attended public schools there. She married James A. Clemons Jr. of Lake Charles, Louisiana, and the couple had eight children. In 1952 Richardson received a Bachelor of Science from Southern University (Baton Rouge), becoming a second-generation college graduate after her mother. In 1962, ten years after graduating from Southern University, Richardson graduated from McNeese State University with a Master of Counselling and Master of Psychology.

== Career ==
In 1965 Richardson found employment as a counselor in the Louisiana Department of Labor. Nine years later, she left that department to work at the Louisiana Department of Health and Hospitals. While involved in the health department, Richardson centered her work on mental health and substance abuse services. She eventually became deputy assistant secretary of the department. From 1992 to 1994, Richardson was also deputy assistant secretary of state at the Louisiana Office of Alcohol and Drug Abuse.

Richardson then struck out on her own, forming a healthcare consulting firm — Rupert Richardson and Associates. She also served on several boards for the state, which included the Louisiana Gaming Control Board, Louisiana Commission on Human Rights, Louisiana Advisory Committee to the United States Commission on Civil Rights, the Louisiana State University School of Social Welfare Advisory Committee, and the Governor's Council for Drug-Free Schools.

== Civil rights work and Presidency of the NAACP ==
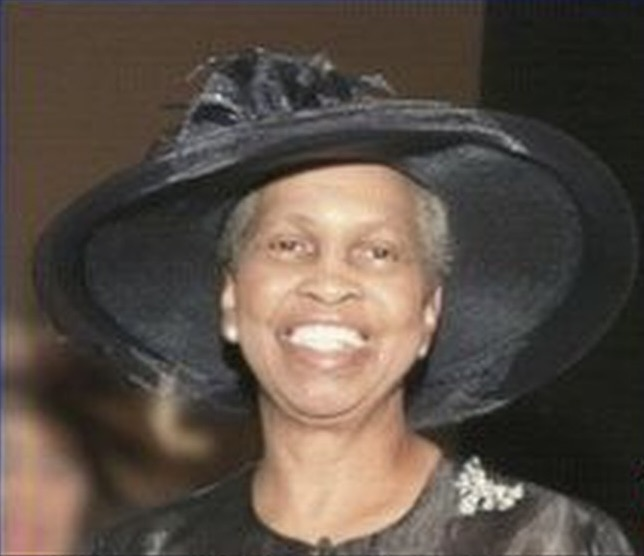

Richardson first joined the NAACP as a teenager in the 1940s, working in the anti-lynching movement and against racial segregation. She rose to become president of the Louisiana State Conference of the NAACP for sixteen years. Richardson was also active in the NAACP's national governance, serving on the NAACP board from 1981 to her death, as the NAACP vice president from 1984 to 1991, and as the president of the NAACP from 1992 to 1995. After leaving the presidency in 1995, Richardson was made president emerita of the NAACP.

As president, she oversaw an expansion of the NAACP's work to include increased focus on economic and health care disparities and environmental racism. After a 1995 scandal in which the NAACP's executive director Benjamin Chavis was revealed to have misused the organization's funds, Richardson worked to repair the NAACP's image. She created partnerships with groups such as the Harvard Business School.

From 1999 to 2008 she chaired the NAACP's Health Committee, which she had advocated for the creation of, focusing on HIV/AIDS in the United States among minority groups. Towards the end of her life, Richardson remained active in civil rights, advocating on behalf of the Jena Six in 2006 and 2007. She was known as the "grand dame" of the organization; Julian Bond, an activist at the NAACP, said that "Rupert Richardson was in many ways the conscience of the NAACP".

== Rupert Richardson Memorial Leadership Award ==
The Rupert Richardson Memorial Leadership Award was named in Richardson's honor to recognize NAACP Presidents who avidly epitomizing excellence, professionalism, progressive innovation, input into youth development, Unit growth, collaboration and sustainability excellence. This was the highest award a Local NAACP President could receive from the NAACP nationally.

The award winners are as follows:

Mr. Derrick L. Foward, President, Dayton Branch NAACP – 2013

Mr. Nelson Linder, President, Austin NAACP – 2012

Attorney Danatus N. King Sr., President, New Orleans Branch – 2011

Ms. Dot Scott, President, Charleston Branch NAACP – 2009

== Death ==
On January 24, 2008, Richardson died in Baton Rouge. Her body lay in state at the Old Louisiana State Capitol. After her death, Bobby Jindal, then Governor of Louisiana, declared January 31 to be "Rupert F. Richardson Day".

== Family ==
Through Richardson's father, Richardson was a first cousin of Norma Holloway Johnson, a former United States District Judge of the United States District Court for the District of Columbia and the first African-American woman to serve as Chief Judge of that United States District Court. Johnson is notable for presiding over the 1998 grand jury investigation of President Bill Clinton.

Non-profit organization positions
Preceded by Hazel Dukes	President of the National Association for the Advancement of Colored People; 1992–1996	Succeeded by Kweisi Mfume as President and CEO of the National Association for the Advancement of Colored People
