= John Sirica =

American federal judge (1904–1992)

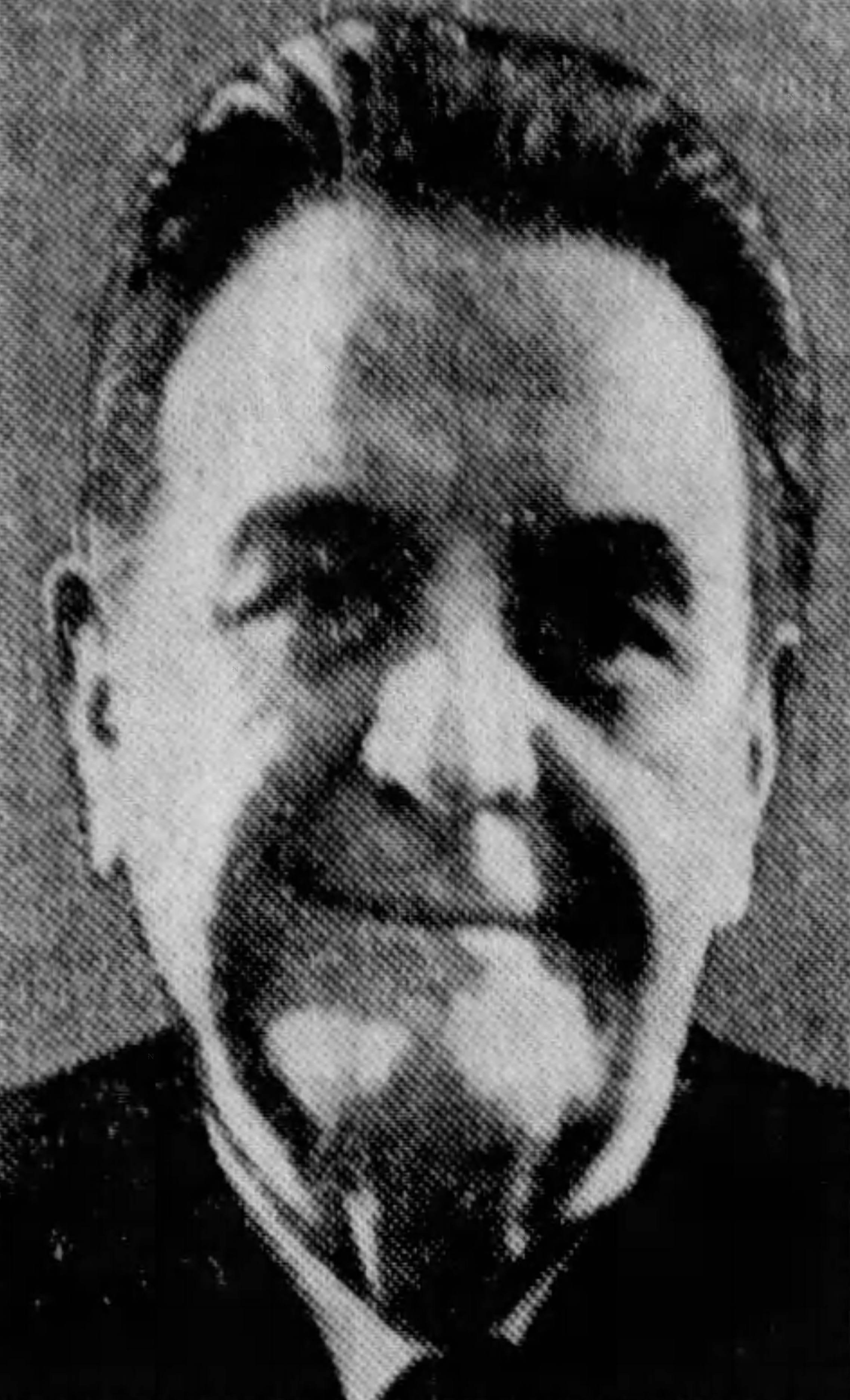
- Sirica, c. 1973

Senior Judge of the United States District Court for the District of Columbia
- In office October 31, 1977 – August 14, 1992

Chief Judge of the United States District Court for the District of Columbia
- In office April 2, 1971 – March 19, 1974
- Preceded by: Edward Matthew Curran
- Succeeded by: George Luzerne Hart Jr.

Judge of the United States District Court for the District of Columbia
- In office March 28, 1957 – October 31, 1977
- Appointed by: Dwight D. Eisenhower
- Preceded by: Henry Albert Schweinhaut
- Succeeded by: Harold H. Greene

Personal details
- Born: John Joseph Sirica; March 19, 1904 Waterbury, Connecticut, U.S.
- Died: August 14, 1992 (aged 88) Washington, D.C., U.S.
- Resting place: Gate of Heaven Cemetery; Silver Spring, Maryland
- Party: Republican
- Spouse: Lucile Camalier (1923-1998)
- Education: Georgetown University (LLB)

John Joseph Sirica (March 19, 1904 – August 14, 1992) was an American lawyer and jurist who was a United States district judge of the United States District Court for the District of Columbia from 1957 to 1992. Sirica became known in the early 1970s for presiding over the federal criminal trials relating to the origins of the Watergate scandal, which eventually led to the resignation of President Richard Nixon.

== Early life and education ==
Sirica was born in Waterbury, Connecticut, to Ferdinando (Fred) Sirica, an immigrant from Italy, and Rose (Zinno) Sirica, whose parents were from Italy. Between 1910 and 1918, the Sirica family lived in various cities across the United States, while Fred worked as a barber and made several unsuccessful attempts at running small businesses. The family moved to Washington, D.C., in 1918, where John attended Emerson Preparatory School and eventually transferred to Columbia Preparatory School. In 1922, Fred was running a two-lane bowling alley and poolhall, which was raided by the police for violation of the Prohibition-era Volstead Act when liquor was found in the restroom. Fred was arrested, but the charges were dropped. He soon sold the business and moved away. Meanwhile, John went directly from high school to law school, which was possible in the District of Columbia at the time, and, after two false starts, entered Georgetown Law and received a Bachelor of Laws in 1926.

== Career ==
Sirica fought as a boxer in Washington and Miami in the 1920s and 1930s. He was torn between a career as a boxer and the career in law that he followed after earning a law degree and passing the bar. Boxing champion Jack Dempsey became a close friend. Sirica was in private practice of law in Washington, D.C. from 1926 to 1930. He was an Assistant United States Attorney for the District of Columbia from 1930 to 1934, and returned to private practice from 1934 to 1957. He also served as general counsel to the House Select Committee to Investigate the Federal Communications Commission in 1944; his appointment was opposed by the two Republican members of the committee. Sirica resigned in protest over how the committee dealt with the WMCA radio scandal that year and re-entered private practice. In 1947, he joined the law firm of Hogan and Hartson in Washington, D.C. (now called Hogan Lovells).

== Federal judicial service ==
Sirica was nominated by President Dwight D. Eisenhower on February 25, 1957, to a seat on the United States District Court for the District of Columbia vacated by Judge Henry Albert Schweinhaut. He was confirmed by the United States Senate on March 26, 1957, and received his commission on March 28, 1957. He served as Chief Judge and a member of the Judicial Conference of the United States from 1971 to 1974. He assumed senior status on October 31, 1977. His service terminated on his death on August 14, 1992.

Notably, he ruled the law banning Navy women from ships to be unconstitutional in the case Owens v. Brown.

=== Watergate ===
Sirica rose to national prominence when he ordered President Richard Nixon to surrender his recordings of White House conversations to Federal prosecutors. Sirica's involvement in the case began when he presided over the trial of the Watergate burglars. He did not believe the claim that they had acted alone, and through the use of provisional sentencing strongly encouraged them to give information about higher-ups before final sentencing. Under provisional sentencing, judges could give defendants a few months to ponder their sentence before it became final. One defendant, James W. McCord Jr., wrote a letter describing a broader scheme of involvement by people in the Nixon administration.

=== Judicial demeanor ===
Experienced as a trial lawyer, Sirica was known for his "no-nonsense" demeanor on the bench. His critics said he lacked understanding of people and compassion, that he was guilty of careless legal errors, that he had a misguided view of the purposes of judicial power. Most of all, they attacked him for his conduct of the Watergate trial. He was nicknamed "Maximum John" for giving defendants the maximum sentence that guidelines allowed.

== Book ==
In 1979, Sirica published a book, co-authored with John Stacks, detailing his participation in the Watergate cases under the title To Set the Record Straight.

== Recognition ==
For his role in uncovering the truth about Watergate, Sirica was named Time magazine's Man of the Year in January 1974.

In 1977, he received the Golden Plate Award of the American Academy of Achievement presented by Awards Council member Leon Jaworski.

== Death ==
Sirica suffered a severe heart attack while at a speaking engagement on February 5, 1976. In the final years of his life, Sirica suffered from a wide range of ailments, both minor and severe. In the last few weeks of his life, he came down with pneumonia. He fell and broke his collarbone a few days before his death, and was hospitalized at Georgetown University Medical Center in Washington, D.C. He died in the hospital of cardiac arrest at 4:30 p.m. on August 14, 1992. He was interred at Gate of Heaven Cemetery in Silver Spring, Maryland. Sirica was survived by his wife, Lucile Camalier Sirica, and his three children, John Jr., Patricia, and Eileen.

== In popular culture ==
In the 2023 HBO Max miniseries White House Plumbers, Sirica is portrayed by F. Murray Abraham.

== Bibliography ==
- Franscell, Ron (2012). The Crime Buff's Guide to Outlaw Washington, D.C. Guilford, Conn.: Globe Pequot Press. ISBN 9780762773855.
- Sirica, John (April 1, 1979). To Set the Record Straight: The Break-In, the Tapes, the Conspirators, the Pardon. New York: W W Norton & Co. ISBN 0393012344.

Legal offices
Preceded by Henry Albert Schweinhaut	Judge of the United States District Court for the District of Columbia; 1957–1977	Succeeded by Harold H. Greene
Preceded by Edward Matthew Curran	Chief Judge of the United States District Court for the District of Columbia; 1971–1974	Succeeded by George Luzerne Hart Jr.
