= George Luzerne Hart Jr. =

American judge

Presiding Judge of the United States Foreign Intelligence Surveillance Court
- In office May 19, 1979 – May 19, 1982
- Appointed by: Warren E. Burger
- Preceded by: Seat established
- Succeeded by: John Lewis Smith Jr.

Senior Judge of the United States District Court for the District of Columbia
- In office May 16, 1979 – May 21, 1984

Chief Judge of the United States District Court for the District of Columbia
- In office March 19, 1974 – July 14, 1975
- Preceded by: John Sirica
- Succeeded by: William Blakely Jones

Judge of the United States District Court for the District of Columbia
- In office August 29, 1958 – May 16, 1979
- Appointed by: Dwight D. Eisenhower
- Preceded by: James Robert Kirkland
- Succeeded by: Norma Holloway Johnson

Personal details
- Born: July 14, 1905 Roanoke, Virginia, U.S.
- Died: May 21, 1984 (aged 78) Washington, D.C., U.S.
- Education: Virginia Military Institute (A.B.); Harvard Law School (LL.B.)

George Luzerne Hart Jr. (July 14, 1905 – May 21, 1984) was a United States district judge of the United States District Court for the District of Columbia.

== Education and career ==
Born in Roanoke, Virginia, Hart attended Forest Park Academy. He received an Artium Baccalaureus degree from Virginia Military Institute in 1927 and a Bachelor of Laws from Harvard Law School in 1930. He was admitted to the District of Columbia bar in 1930. He was in private practice in Washington, D.C. at Lambert & Hart from 1930 to 1941. He was in the United States Army Reserve during World War II from 1941 to 1946. He became a captain in artillery, then served in the United States Army Air Force, rising to the rank of colonel in the United States Air Force when it became a separate service. He returned to private practice from 1946 to 1958.

== Federal judicial service ==
On August 29, 1958, Hart received a recess appointment from President Dwight D. Eisenhower to a seat on the United States District Court for the District of Columbia vacated by Judge James Robert Kirkland. Formally nominated to the same seat by President Eisenhower on January 17, 1959, Hart was confirmed by the United States Senate on September 9, 1959, and received his commission on September 10, 1959. He served as Chief Judge and as a member of the Judicial Conference of the United States from 1974 to 1975, assuming senior status on May 16, 1979. He served as the Presiding Judge of the United States Foreign Intelligence Surveillance Court from 1979 to 1982. Hart continued to serve in senior status until his death on May 21, 1984, in Washington, D.C. He is buried at Arlington National Cemetery.

== Sources ==
- Burchard, Hank (May 5, 1972). "Leading cryptanalysts seek to break secret code reported to tell of buried treasure in Virginia" (PDF). Washington Post.

Legal offices
| Preceded by James Robert Kirkland | Judge of the United States District Court for the District of Columbia; 1958–1979 | Succeeded by Norma Holloway Johnson |
| Preceded by John Sirica | Chief Judge of the United States District Court for the District of Columbia; 1974–1975 | Succeeded by William Blakely Jones |
| Preceded by Seat established | Presiding Judge of the United States Foreign Intelligence Surveillance Court; 1979–1982 | Succeeded by John Lewis Smith Jr. |
