= Bolitha James Laws =

American judge

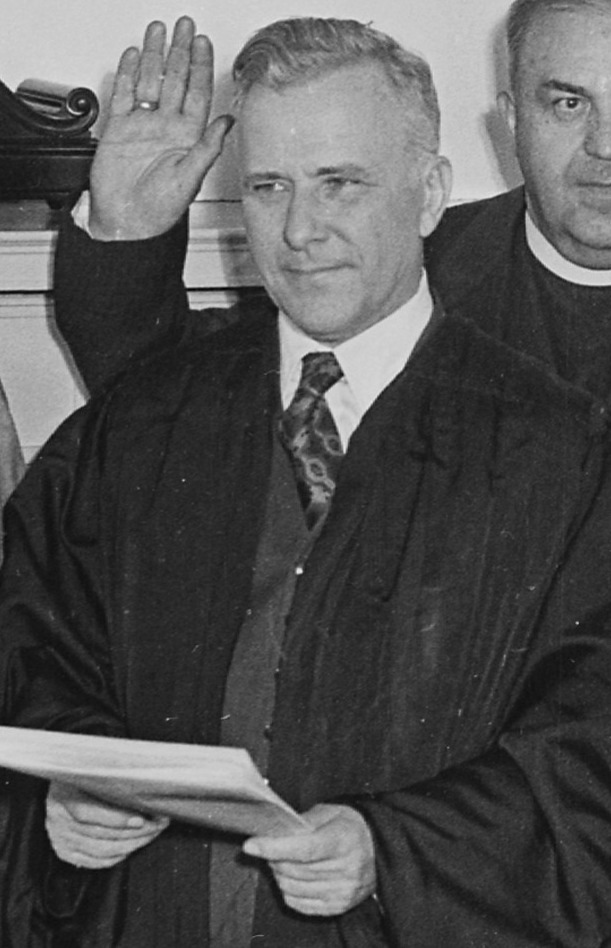

Chief Judge of the United States District Court for the District of Columbia
- In office 1948–1958
- Preceded by: Office established
- Succeeded by: F. Dickinson Letts

Judge of the United States District Court for the District of Columbia
- In office September 1, 1948 – November 14, 1958
- Appointed by: operation of law
- Preceded by: Seat established by 62 Stat. 869
- Succeeded by: Leonard Patrick Walsh

Chief Justice of the District Court of the United States for the District of Columbia
- In office February 23, 1945 – September 1, 1948
- Appointed by: Franklin D. Roosevelt
- Preceded by: Edward C. Eicher
- Succeeded by: Seat abolished

Associate Justice of the District Court of the United States for the District of Columbia
- In office June 24, 1938 – February 23, 1945
- Appointed by: Franklin D. Roosevelt
- Preceded by: Seat established by 52 Stat. 584
- Succeeded by: Alexander Holtzoff

Personal details
- Born: Bolitha James Laws; August 22, 1891 Washington, D.C., U.S.
- Died: November 14, 1958 (aged 67)
- Education: Georgetown Law (LL.B., LL.M.)

Bolitha James Laws (August 22, 1891 – November 14, 1958) was a United States district judge of the United States District Court for the District of Columbia.

== Education and career ==
Born in Washington, D.C., Laws received a Bachelor of Laws from Georgetown Law in 1913, and a Master of Laws from the same institution in 1914. He was an Assistant United States Attorney for the District of Columbia from 1914 to 1920. He was in private practice in New York City, New York from 1920 to 1921, and was a litigation counsel and assistant general counsel to the United States Shipping Board's Emergency Fleet Corporation from 1921 to 1922. He then returned to private practice in Washington, D.C., from 1922 to 1938.

== Federal judicial service ==
Laws was nominated by President Franklin D. Roosevelt on June 10, 1938, to the District Court of the United States for the District of Columbia, to a new Associate Justice seat authorized by 52 Stat. 584. He was confirmed by the United States Senate on June 16, 1938, and received his commission on June 24, 1938. He served as a Judge of the Emergency Court of Appeals from 1943 to 1958. His service terminated on February 23, 1945, due to his elevation to Chief Justice of the same court.

Laws was nominated by President Roosevelt on January 19, 1945, to the Chief Justice seat on the District Court of the United States for the District of Columbia vacated by Chief Justice Edward C. Eicher. He was confirmed by the Senate on February 22, 1945, and received his commission on February 23, 1945. Laws was reassigned by operation of law to the United States District Court for the District of Columbia on September 1, 1948, to a new judge seat authorized by 62 Stat. 869. He served as Chief Justice from 1948 until his death on November 14, 1958, and was also a member of the Judicial Conference of the United States during that year.

== Sources ==
Legal offices
Preceded by Seat established by 52 Stat. 584	Associate Justice of the District Court of the United States for the District of Columbia; 1938–1945	Succeeded by Alexander Holtzoff
Preceded by Edward C. Eicher	Chief Justice of the District Court of the United States for the District of Columbia; 1945–1948	Succeeded by Seat abolished
Preceded by Seat established by 62 Stat. 869	Judge of the United States District Court for the District of Columbia; 1948–1958	Succeeded by Leonard Patrick Walsh
Preceded by Office established	Chief Judge of the United States District Court for the District of Columbia; 1948–1958	Succeeded by F. Dickinson Letts
