= William Blakely Jones =

American judge

Senior Judge of the United States District Court for the District of Columbia
- In office March 20, 1977 – July 31, 1979

Chief Judge of the United States District Court for the District of Columbia
- In office 1975–1977
- Preceded by: George Luzerne Hart Jr.
- Succeeded by: William B. Bryant

Judge of the United States District Court for the District of Columbia
- In office April 12, 1962 – March 20, 1977
- Appointed by: John F. Kennedy
- Preceded by: F. Dickinson Letts
- Succeeded by: Louis F. Oberdorfer

Personal details
- Born: William Blakely Jones; March 20, 1907 Cedar Rapids, Iowa, U.S.
- Died: July 31, 1979 (aged 72) Chevy Chase, Maryland, U.S.
- Education: University of Notre Dame (A.B.); Notre Dame Law School (LL.B.)

William Blakely Jones (March 20, 1907 – July 31, 1979) was a United States district judge of the United States District Court for the District of Columbia.

== Education and career ==
Born in Cedar Rapids, Iowa, Jones received an Artium Baccalaureus degree from the University of Notre Dame in 1928 and a Bachelor of Laws from Notre Dame Law School in 1931. He was in private practice in Helena, Montana from 1931 to 1937, also serving as a special assistant state attorney general of Montana from 1935 to 1937. He was an attorney for the United States Department of Justice from 1937 to 1943, and in the United States Office of Patents and Appeals in 1943, becoming an executive assistant to the American Chairman of the Joint British-American Patent Interchange Commission from 1943 to 1946. He returned to private practice in Washington, D.C., from 1946 to 1962.

== Federal judicial service ==
On March 19, 1962, Jones was nominated by President John F. Kennedy to a seat on the United States District Court for the District of Columbia vacated by Judge F. Dickinson Letts. Jones was confirmed by the United States Senate on April 11, 1962, and received his commission on April 12, 1962. He served as Chief Judge and as a member of the Judicial Conference of the United States from 1975 to 1977, assuming senior status on March 20, 1977, and serving in that capacity until his death on July 31, 1979.

== Sources ==
Legal offices
| Preceded by F. Dickinson Letts | Judge of the United States District Court for the District of Columbia; 1962–1977 | Succeeded by Louis F. Oberdorfer |
| Preceded by George Luzerne Hart Jr. | Chief Judge of the United States District Court for the District of Columbia; 1975–1977 | Succeeded by William B. Bryant |
