= Alexander Holtzoff =

American judge

Senior Judge of the United States District Court for the District of Columbia
- In office December 31, 1967 – September 6, 1969

Judge of the United States District Court for the District of Columbia
- In office September 28, 1945 – December 31, 1967
- Appointed by: Harry S. Truman
- Preceded by: Bolitha James Laws
- Succeeded by: John H. Pratt

Personal details
- Born: Alexander Holtzoff; November 7, 1886 Riga, Russia
- Died: September 6, 1969 (aged 82)
- Education: Columbia University (A.B., M.A.); Columbia Law School (LL.B.)

Alexander Holtzoff (November 7, 1886 – September 6, 1969) was a United States district judge of the United States District Court for the District of Columbia.

== Education and career ==
Born in New York City, Holtzoff received an Artium Baccalaureus degree from Columbia University in 1908, a Master of Arts degree from the same institution in 1909, and a Bachelor of Laws from Columbia Law School in 1911. He was in private practice in New York City from 1911 to 1924, excepting his service as a private in the United States Army in 1918. He was a special assistant to the Office of the Attorney General of the United States of the United States Department of Justice in Washington, D.C., from 1924 to 1945, and was an executive assistant in that office in 1945. In this role, Holtzoff served as the Secretary, Advisory Committee on Rules of Criminal Procedure. He was a prime mover in revising the Federal Rules of Procedure to make them simple, effective, and cost-conscious. The reforms took place from 1941 to 1945 and govern federal criminal procedure to this day, with some amendments from time-to-time. Prior to this reform, federal procedure was scattered among various federal statutes and was not uniform across the country, resulting in unneeded intricacies that inhibited justice.

== Federal judicial service ==
Holtzoff was nominated by President Harry S. Truman on September 12, 1945, to an Associate Justice seat on the District Court of the United States for the District of Columbia (Judge of the United States District Court for the District of Columbia from June 25, 1948) vacated by Judge Bolitha James Laws. He was confirmed by the United States Senate on September 24, 1945, and received his commission on September 28, 1945. He assumed senior status on December 31, 1967. His service terminated on September 6, 1969, due to his death.

== See also ==
- List of Jewish American jurists

== Sources ==
Legal offices
Preceded by Bolitha James Laws	Judge of the United States District Court for the District of Columbia; 1945–1967	Succeeded by John H. Pratt
