= Oscar Raymond Luhring =

American judge (1879–1944)

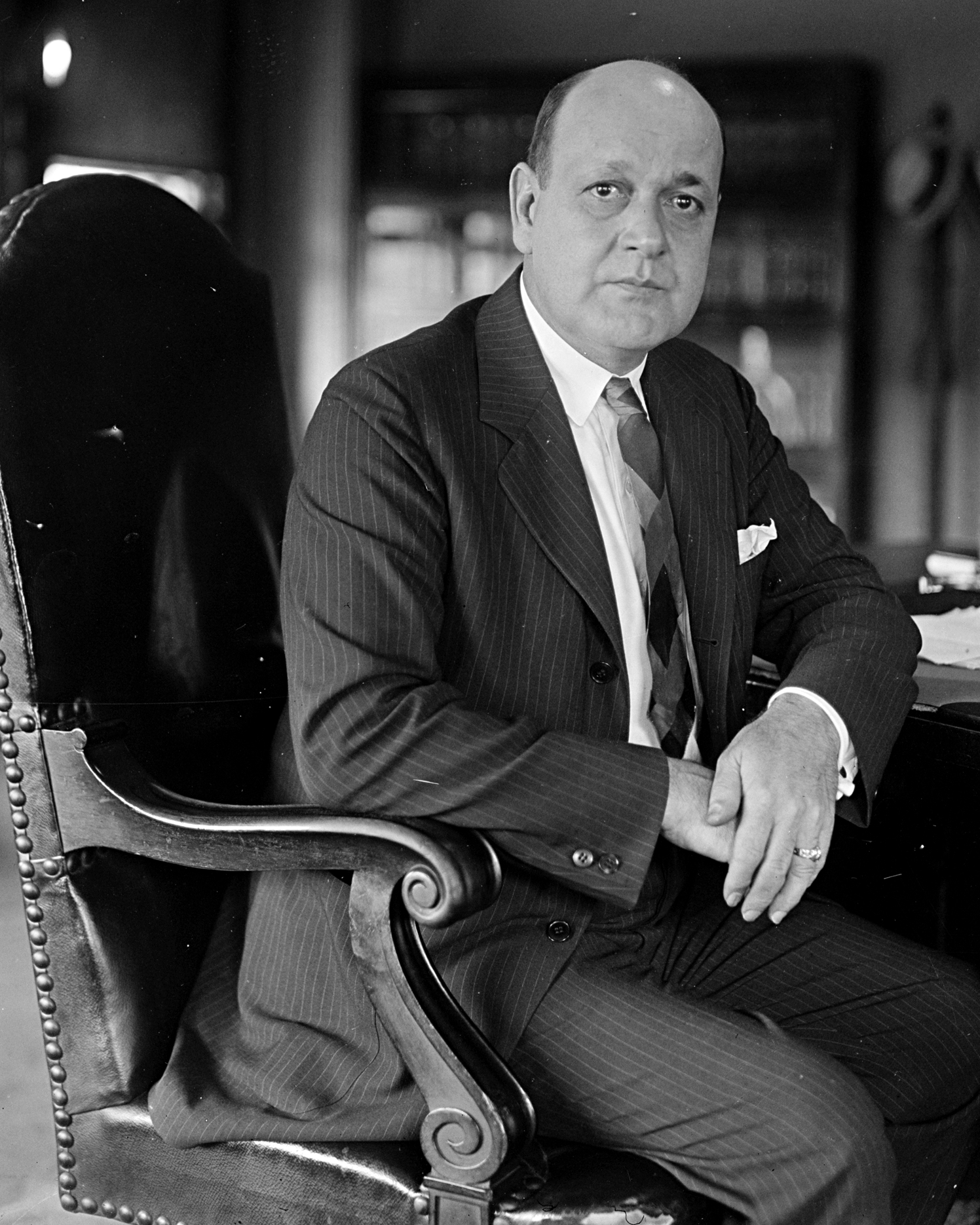

Associate Justice of the District Court of the United States for the District of Columbia
- In office July 3, 1930 – August 18, 1944
- Appointed by: Herbert Hoover
- Preceded by: Seat established by 46 Stat. 785
- Succeeded by: Henry Albert Schweinhaut

United States Assistant Attorney General for the Criminal Division
- In office 1925–1930
- President: Calvin Coolidge; Herbert Hoover
- Preceded by: William J. Donovan
- Succeeded by: E. Nugent Dodds

Member of the U.S. House of Representatives from Indiana's 1st district
- In office March 4, 1919 – March 3, 1923
- Preceded by: George K. Denton
- Succeeded by: William E. Wilson

Personal details
- Born: Oscar Raymond Luhring; February 11, 1879 Haubstadt, Indiana, U.S.
- Died: August 18, 1944 (aged 65) Washington, D.C., U.S.
- Resting place: National Memorial Park; Falls Church, Virginia
- Party: Republican
- Education: University of Virginia School of Law (LL.B.)

Oscar Raymond Luhring (February 11, 1879 – August 18, 1944) was an American lawyer and jurist who served as a United States representative from Indiana and an Associate Justice of the District Court of the United States for the District of Columbia.

== Education and career ==
Born in Haubstadt, Gibson County, Indiana, the grandson of German immigrants, Luhring attended the public schools and received a Bachelor of Laws from the University of Virginia School of Law in 1900. He was admitted to the bar and entered private practice in Evansville, Indiana in 1900. He was a member of the Indiana House of Representatives from 1903 to 1904. He was a deputy prosecuting attorney of the First Judicial Circuit of Indiana from 1904 to 1908. He was prosecuting attorney of the First Judicial Circuit of Indiana from 1908 to 1912.

== Congressional service ==
Luhring was elected as a Republican to the United States House of Representatives of the 66th and 67th United States Congresses, serving from March 4, 1919, to March 3, 1923, and was an unsuccessful candidate for reelection in 1922 to the 68th United States Congress.

== Later career ==
Luhring was a special assistant to the United States Secretary of Labor in Washington, D.C. from 1923 to 1925. He was appointed by President Calvin Coolidge as Assistant United States Attorney General for the Criminal Division of the United States Department of Justice in 1925 and served until 1930.

== Federal judicial service ==
Luhring was nominated by President Herbert Hoover on June 23, 1930, to the Supreme Court of the District of Columbia (District Court of the United States for the District of Columbia from June 25, 1936, now the United States District Court for the District of Columbia), to a new Associate Justice seat authorized by 46 Stat. 785. He was confirmed by the United States Senate on July 3, 1930, and received his commission the same day. His service terminated on August 18, 1944, due to his death in Washington, D.C. He was interred in Abbey Mausoleum in Arlington County, Virginia, and reinterred in National Memorial Park in Falls Church, Virginia.

== Sources ==
- United States Congress. "Oscar Raymond Luhring (id: L000505)". Biographical Directory of the United States Congress.

U.S. House of Representatives
Preceded by George K. Denton	Member of the U.S. House of Representatives from Indiana's 1st congressional district 1919–1923	Succeeded by William E. Wilson
Legal offices
Preceded by Seat established by 46 Stat. 785	Associate Justice of the District Court of the United States for the District of Columbia; 1930–1944	Succeeded by Henry Albert Schweinhaut
