= Norma Holloway Johnson =

American judge

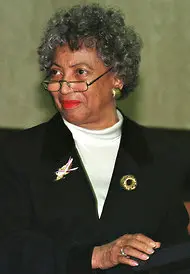

Senior Judge of the United States District Court for the District of Columbia
- In office June 18, 2001 – December 31, 2003

Chief Judge of the United States District Court for the District of Columbia
- In office March 19, 1997 – June 18, 2001
- Preceded by: John Garrett Penn
- Succeeded by: Thomas F. Hogan

Judge of the United States District Court for the District of Columbia
- In office May 12, 1980 – June 18, 2001
- Appointed by: Jimmy Carter
- Preceded by: George Luzerne Hart Jr.
- Succeeded by: Richard J. Leon

Personal details
- Born: Normalie Loyce Holloway; July 28, 1932 Lake Charles, Louisiana, U.S.
- Died: September 18, 2011 (aged 79) Lake Charles, Louisiana, U.S.
- Party: Democratic
- Relatives: Rupert Richardson (cousin)
- Education: University of the District of Columbia (BS); Georgetown University (JD)

Norma Holloway Johnson (July 28, 1932 – September 18, 2011), born Normalie Loyce Holloway, was a former United States district judge who served as the chief judge of the United States District Court for the District of Columbia, and was the first African-American woman to serve as chief judge of that United States district court. Johnson presided over the grand jury investigation into President Bill Clinton’s affair with Monica Lewinsky.

== Education and career ==
Johnson was born on July 28, 1932, in Lake Charles, Louisiana, to Henry and Beatrice Williams Holloway. Johnson received a Bachelor of Science degree from District of Columbia Teachers College (now the University of the District of Columbia) in 1955. Johnson was the first African-American woman graduate of the Georgetown University Law Center, and she earned a Juris Doctor in 1962. She entered private practice in Washington, D.C., and then became a trial attorney at the United States Department of Justice Civil Division from 1963 to 1967. She worked as an assistant corporation counsel (a position later retitled Assistant Attorney General) for the District of Columbia from 1967 to 1970. In 1970, Johnson was appointed by President Richard Nixon to be a judge of the District of Columbia Superior Court.

== Federal judicial service ==
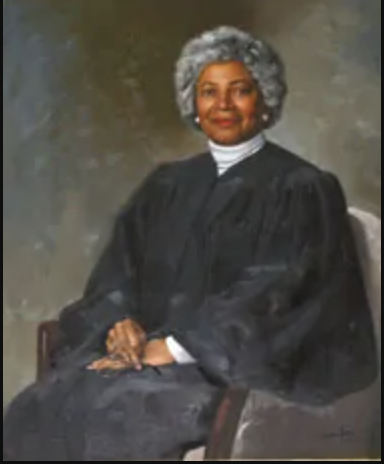

Johnson was nominated by President Jimmy Carter on February 28, 1980, to a seat on the United States District Court for the District of Columbia vacated by Judge George Luzerne Hart Jr. She was confirmed by the United States Senate on May 9, 1980, and received her commission on May 12, 1980. She served as chief judge from 1997 until June 18, 2001, when she assumed senior status. Johnson served in that capacity until her retirement on December 31, 2003.

=== President Clinton grand jury investigation and notable rulings ===
As the chief judge of the United States District Court for the District of Columbia, the Washington Post referred to Johnson as a "Key Player" in the 1998 grand jury investigation of President Bill Clinton due to her having to rule on a raft of motions relating to the investigation by independent counsel Kenneth W. Starr.

As chief judge from 1997 to 2001, Johnson oversaw legal issues emanating from grand jury investigations; one of her most demanding assignments came when independent counsel Kenneth W. Starr began investigating President Bill Clinton’s relationship with White House intern Monica Lewinsky. Accordingly, Johnson ruled on Kenneth Starr's probe of the Clinton administration. Notably, in 1998, as Starr was attempting to use a grand jury to gather evidence against President Clinton, Johnson ruled that Clinton could not assert a privilege that would have blocked the independent counsel from questioning White House aides. Specifically, Johnson ruled that President Clinton's right to executive privilege was outweighed by Starr's legitimate need for evidence. That decision and others permitted Starr to move ahead with his obstruction of justice inquiry of the president.

Johnson also oversaw the conviction of Rita Lavelle on charges of making false statements, obstruction of a congressional investigation, and perjury and sentenced her to prison.

Additionally, in sentencing former congressman Dan Rostenkowski to 17 months in prison for mail fraud, she told the chairman of the House Ways and Means Committee in 1996 that “you capriciously pursued a course of personal gain for you, your family and your friends. You have stained them, as well as yourself.”

== Death ==
Johnson died September 18, 2011, at her brother's home in her native Lake Charles, following a stroke.

== Family ==
Through Johnson's mother, Johnson was a first cousin of Rupert Richardson, an African-American civil rights activist and civil rights leader who served as the president of the National Association for the Advancement of Colored People (NAACP) from 1992 to 1995.

== See also ==
- List of African-American federal judges
- List of African-American jurists
- List of first women lawyers and judges in Washington D.C.

== Sources ==
Legal offices
Preceded by George Luzerne Hart Jr.	Judge of the United States District Court for the District of Columbia; 1980–2001	Succeeded by Richard J. Leon
Preceded by John Garrett Penn	Chief Judge of the United States District Court for the District of Columbia; 1997–2001	Succeeded by Thomas F. Hogan
