= George K. Denton =

American politician (1864–1926)

George Kirkpatrick Denton
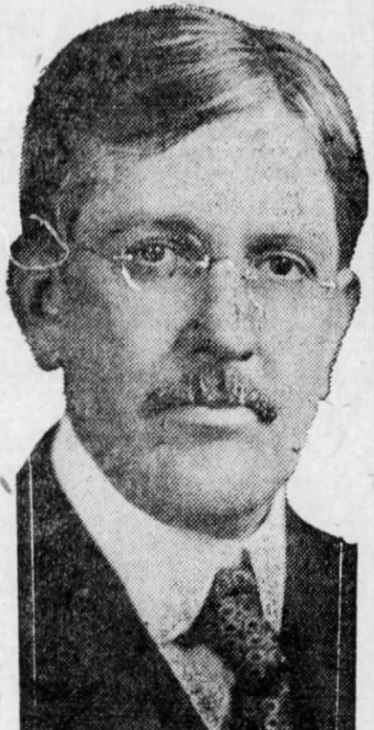
- The Indianapolis Star, January 5, 1926

Member of the U.S. House of Representatives from Indiana's 1st district
- In office March 4, 1917 – March 3, 1919
- Preceded by: Charles Lieb
- Succeeded by: Oscar R. Luhring

Personal details
- Born: November 17, 1864 near Sebree, Kentucky, U.S.
- Died: January 4, 1926 (aged 61) Evansville, Indiana, U.S.
- Party: Democratic
- Children: Winfield K. Denton
- Education: Ohio Wesleyan University

George Kirkpatrick Denton (November 17, 1864 – January 4, 1926) was an American lawyer and politician who served one term as a U.S. representative from Indiana from 1917 to 1919. He was the father of Winfield K. Denton.

== Biography ==
Born near Sebree, Kentucky, Denton attended the public schools and Van Horn Institute. He was graduated from the Ohio Wesleyan University at Delaware in 1891 and from the law department of Boston (Massachusetts) University in 1893. He was admitted to the bar in 1893 and commenced practice in Evansville, Indiana. He served as counsel for the Intermediate Life Insurance Co..

=== Congress ===
Denton was elected as a Democrat to the Sixty-fifth Congress (March 4, 1917 – March 3, 1919). He was an unsuccessful candidate for reelection in 1918 to the Sixty-sixth Congress, losing by four percentage points to Oscar Luhring in the general election.

=== Later career and death ===
He resumed the practice of law in Evansville, Indiana. He was an unsuccessful candidate in 1924 for judge of the Indiana Supreme Court. Candidate for the Democratic nomination for United States Senator in 1926, but died before the primary election. He died in Evansville, Indiana, January 4, 1926. He was interred in Oak Hill Cemetery.

== Electoral history ==
General election 1916
Party	Candidate	Votes	%
Democratic	George K. Denton	23,278	48.1
Republican	S. Wallace Cook	22,955	47.4

General election 1918
Party	Candidate	Votes	%
Republican	Oscar R. Luhring	20,440	52.0
Democratic	George K. Denton	18,837	48.0

U.S. House of Representatives
Preceded by Charles Lieb	Member of the U.S. House of Representatives from Indiana's 1st congressional district 1917–1919	Succeeded by Oscar R. Luhring
