= Margaret Schweinhaut =

American politician

Member of the Maryland Senate from the 18 district
- In office 1961–1963
- In office 1967–1991

Member of the Maryland House of Delegates from the 3B district
- In office 1955–1961

Personal details
- Born: Margaret Mary Collins; 1903 Washington, D.C., U.S.
- Died: March 16, 1997 (aged 92–93) Kensington, Maryland, U.S.
- Resting place: Gate of Heaven Cemetery (Silver Spring, Maryland)
- Party: Democratic
- Spouse: Henry Albert Schweinhaut
- Children: 2
- Education: George Washington University; National University School of Law

Margaret "Peg" Schweinhaut (1903 - 1997) was a longtime Maryland state senator known for her advocacy on behalf of the elderly. She founded the state's Commission on Aging and chaired it for 24 years. She was inducted into the Maryland Women's Hall of Fame in 1992.

== Early life and education ==
She was born in the Georgetown neighborhood of Washington, D.C., in 1903. She attended D.C. public schools before earning degrees at George Washington University and the National University School of Law.

== Political career ==
Before running for elected office, Schweinhaut was active in school and community affairs. She campaigned for Franklin D. Roosevelt in 1940. In 1948 she took part in the successful campaign for charter government in Montgomery County, Maryland. In 1954 she was elected to the Maryland House of Delegates. When she took office the following year, she was one of only two female state legislators in Maryland.

At Schweinhaut's urging, Maryland Governor J. Millard Tawes appointed a State Commission on Aging in 1959 and named her its chairperson. She headed the commission for 24 years. Under her leadership, the commission studied the treatment of seniors in state facilities such as nursing homes. The commission's findings led to the passage of at least eleven state laws, including a law that prevents nursing homes from ejecting patients who can no longer pay for their care. Schweinhaut campaigned for meal programs, recreation centers, and assistance for low-income seniors. She also championed environmental causes and gun control, and opposed capital punishment and abortion.

She chaired the State Commission on Aging from 1959 to 1983 and the Executive Nominations Committee from 1971 to 1983. She served on the Legislative Council (now the Legislative Policy Committee) from 1971 to 1983 and from 1986 to 1990. She was a member of the Judicial Proceedings Committee. She also served on the Governor's Commission on Condominiums, Cooperatives and Homeowners Associations; the Governor's Task Force on Senior Citizen Activity Centers; the Golden Age Card Task Force; and the Task Force on Elderly Abuse and Neglect. She was a member of the International Gerontological Society and the Arc of Montgomery County.

Schweinhaut's career as a state senator was interrupted when she ran unsuccessfully for Congress in 1962. She returned to the senate in 1967, where she served until 1991. She was defeated for reelection to the state senate in the 1990 Democratic primary by then-Delegate Patricia Sher, who criticized her opposition to abortion.

== Personal life ==
She married Henry Schweinhaut, a lawyer, in 1928, and had two daughters. Her husband went on to become a federal judge. The family lived in Washington, D.C., until 1941, when they moved to Chevy Chase, Maryland. They moved to Kensington, Maryland, in 1958.

Schweinhaut died of heart failure at her home in Kensington on March 16, 1997. She was buried at the Gate of Heaven Cemetery in Silver Spring, Maryland.

== Awards and memorials ==
- Honorary Doctor of Laws degree, St. Joseph's College (Maryland), 1971
- Certificate of Merit, National Council of Senior Citizens
- Outstanding Legislator, Knights of Columbus
- Citation of Merit, Veterans of Foreign Wars
- Outstanding Service, Bethesda-Chevy Chase Chamber of Commerce
- The Montgomery County Sentinel Legislator of the Year Award, 1983
- Inducted into the Maryland Women's Hall of Fame, 1992

The Margaret Schweinhaut Senior Center in Silver Spring, Maryland, was named in her honor.
