= John H. Pratt =

American judge (1910–1995)

Senior Judge of the United States District Court for the District of Columbia
- In office December 1, 1989 – August 11, 1995

Judge of the United States District Court for the District of Columbia
- In office June 7, 1968 – December 1, 1989
- Appointed by: Lyndon B. Johnson
- Preceded by: Alexander Holtzoff
- Succeeded by: Michael Boudin

Personal details
- Born: John Helm Pratt; November 17, 1910 Portsmouth, New Hampshire, U.S.
- Died: August 11, 1995 (aged 84) Chevy Chase, Maryland, U.S.
- Party: Democratic
- Education: Harvard University (AB, LLB)

John Helm Pratt (November 17, 1910 – August 11, 1995) was an American lawyer and judge. Born in New Hampshire, Pratt spent most of his life in the Washington, D.C. area, where he practiced law for 34 years before being appointed as a United States district judge of the United States District Court for the District of Columbia in 1968 by President Lyndon B. Johnson. As a federal judge, Pratt presided over a number of significant cases, including the Watergate trial of G. Gordon Liddy and civil rights cases involving school desegregation and discrimination based on sexual orientation.

== Early life and education ==
Pratt was born in Portsmouth, New Hampshire, on November 17, 1910, to Harold B. and Marguerite R. Pratt. At age nine, he and his family moved to the Washington, D.C. area, after his father, a United States Marine Corps officer, was stationed in the area. Pratt and his family briefly moved to Boston (where Pratt studied at the Boston Latin School) but later returned to Washington, where Pratt graduated from Gonzaga College High School and served as a United States Senate page. Pratt studied at Georgetown University for two years before transferring to Harvard University, where he received an Artium Baccalaureus degree cum laude in 1930 at the age of 19. Pratt then attended Harvard Law School, receiving a Bachelor of Laws in 1934.

== Military service and legal career ==
Pratt served in the United States Marine Corps from 1942 and was discharged with the rank of captain in 1946. During World War II, he served in the Pacific theater, where he earned a Bronze Star and Purple Heart. He lost a left arm, in December 1944, in Tacloban, Leyte, the Philippines. He convalesced at Biak, Dutch New Guinea, and then at naval hospitals in the United States, including Bethesda Naval Hospital. Prior to taking the federal bench, Pratt was in the private practice of law in Washington, D.C. for 34 years. He was an associate at Morris, KixMiller & Baar from 1934 to 1942, and a partner at Morris, Pearce, Gardner & Pratt from 1946 to 1968, when he was appointed to the federal bench.

== Federal judicial service ==
Pratt was nominated by President Lyndon B. Johnson on April 11, 1968, to a seat on the United States District Court for the District of Columbia vacated by Judge Alexander Holtzoff. He was confirmed by the United States Senate on June 6, 1968, and received his commission on June 7, 1968.

=== Notable cases ===
Pratt presided over a number of high-profile cases during his time on the bench, including the trial of G. Gordon Liddy in connection with the Watergate scandal. In 1974, Pratt oversaw the bench trial of Liddy, finding him guilty of two counts of contempt of Congress.

Pratt also presided over Hoffa v. Saxbe, a case in which former Teamsters leader James R. Hoffa unsuccessfully made a constitutional challenge to the condition of his 1971 presidential pardon barring him from engaging in "direct or indirect management of any labor union" until March 1980. Pratt ruled in 1974 that the condition of the pardon was valid because (1) it had a direct relationship to the public interest and (2) it did not "unreasonably infringe" on Hoffa's constitutional freedoms.

Pratt also issued rulings on important civil rights issues. He ordered the restoration of the Defense Department security clearances of two gay men in 1971, holding that "government security evaluators cannot subject homosexuals to 'probing personal questions' about their sex lives or withhold security clearances for refusal to answer such questions."

Pratt also presided over another case, Adams v. Richardson (1973), brought by the NAACP Legal Defense and Educational Fund, which sought to compel the United States Department of Health, Education and Welfare (HEW) to enforcedesegregation in schools. Pratt rejected the HEW's argument that Title VI of the Civil Rights Act of 1964 gave the department the discretion to wait for "voluntary compliance" from the states. Citing Alexander v. Holmes County Board of Education, Pratt ruled that desegregation was to occur "at once" in the 113 school districts, mostly in the South, that had failed to desegregate. Pratt also ordered the withholding of federal funding from school districts that failed to comply. Pratt's decision was largely affirmed by the United States Court of Appeals for the District of Columbia Circuit, although it set a ten-month timeframe for states to create desegregation plans, rather than the four-month timeframe set by Pratt.

Pratt also oversaw the long-running Evans v. Fenty case, initially filed in 1978, which involved the abusive conditions at the Forest Haven institution located in Laurel, Maryland, a home for persons with intellectual and developmental disabilities, operated by the District of Columbia. Pratt determined that "patients' constitutional rights to adequate care and treatment had been violated" and issued an order setting forth sweeping changes to be made at the facility, including the movement of 20% of patients to community treatment facilities and limits on the use of physical restraints. In 1990, Pratt held the district in civil contempt of court after learning that just two physicians were caring for 232 residents at Forest Haven, including one who had been determined to be "professionally incompetent" by the Maryland Commission on Medical Discipline two years earlier. Pratt ruled that the district was "continuing obdurate resistance" to providing adequate services to the patients. After repeatedly missing court-imposed deadlines to close Forest Haven, the district finally closed the facility in 1991. Pratt continued to oversee the case until his death, however. In 1995, Pratt announced that he would appoint a special master to oversee "the network of community-based living arrangements that have replaced Forest Haven" because of the district's delays in paying caseworkers and other providers; he appointed Margaret G. Farrell as special master the following year. Federal court monitoring of the district's programs for people with intellectual disabilities continued until 2017.

In another notable case, Broderick v. Ruder, Pratt ruled in favor of complainant Catherine A. Broderick, a Securities and Exchange Commission attorney, finding that Broderick had suffered from pervasive sexual harassment at the SEC's regional office in Washington.

=== Senior status and death ===
Pratt assumed senior status on December 1, 1989, and from then on chose to hear only civil cases. He called the Federal Sentencing Guidelines "atrocious" and believed they set forth excessively harsh penalties for first-time offenders. Pratt was also a critic of mandatory minimum sentences and in the sentencing disparity between crack cocaine and powder cocaine. Pratt served as chairman of the Committee on Judicial Ethics of the Judicial Conference of the United States from 1984 to 1990. He remained on the court until he died on August 11, 1995, at his home in Chevy Chase, Maryland, of lung cancer.

== Personal life ==
Pratt married Bernice Safford Pratt, known as Sissy, on October 25, 1938. They had five children, four daughters and one son.

Legal offices
Preceded by Alexander Holtzoff	Judge of the United States District Court for the District of Columbia; 1968–1989	Succeeded by Michael Boudin
