= James Robert Kirkland =

American judge

Judge of the United States District Court for the District of Columbia
- In office October 21, 1949 – February 25, 1958
- Appointed by: Harry S. Truman
- Preceded by: Seat established by 63 Stat. 493
- Succeeded by: George Luzerne Hart Jr.

Personal details
- Born: James Robert Kirkland; February 15, 1903 Wilmington, Delaware, U.S.
- Died: February 25, 1958 (aged 55) Wilmington, Delaware, U.S.
- Education: George Washington University (A.B.); George Washington University Law School (LL.B., LL.M.); Benjamin Franklin University (B.C.S.)

James Robert Kirkland (February 15, 1903 – February 25, 1958) was a United States district judge of the United States District Court for the District of Columbia.

== Education and career ==
Born in Wilmington, Delaware, Kirkland received an Artium Baccalaureus degree from George Washington University in 1927, a Bachelor of Laws from George Washington University Law School in 1928, and a Master of Laws from the same institution in 1929. He received a Bachelor of Commercial Science degree from Benjamin Franklin University (merged into George Washington University in 1987) in 1930. Kirkland served as an Assistant United States Attorney in Washington, D.C. from 1929 to 1934, then entered private practice in Washington, D.C. from 1934 to 1949. In 1936 he was on active duty serving aboard the U.S.S. Quincy evacuating American citizens from the Spanish Civil War. He served as counsel to the United States Senate Committee on the District of Columbia from 1947 to 1949. He was also served as a United States Naval Reserve Commander.

== Federal judicial service ==
Kirkland received a recess appointment from President Harry S. Truman on October 21, 1949, to the United States District Court for the District of Columbia, to a new seat authorized by 63 Stat. 493. He was nominated to the same position by President Truman on January 5, 1950. He was confirmed by the United States Senate on March 8, 1950, and received his commission on March 9, 1950. His service terminated on February 25, 1958, due to his death in Wilmington.

== Sources ==
Legal offices
Preceded by Seat established by 63 Stat. 493	Judge of the United States District Court for the District of Columbia; 1949–1958	Succeeded by George Luzerne Hart Jr.
