= Charles Lieb =

American politician (1852–1928)

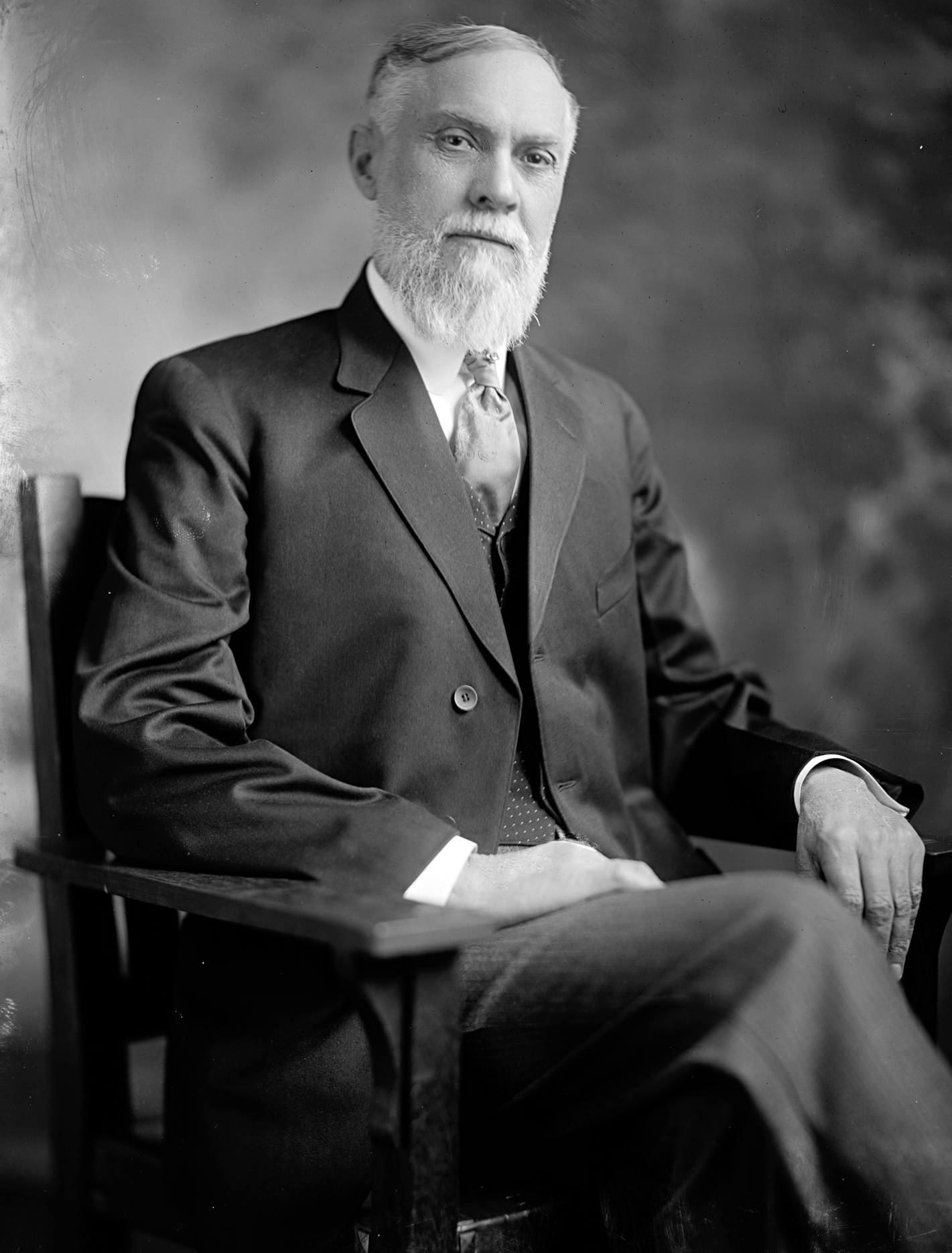

Member of the U.S. House of Representatives from Indiana's 1st district
- In office March 4, 1913 – March 3, 1917
- Preceded by: John W. Boehne
- Succeeded by: George K. Denton

Member of the Indiana House of Representatives from the Spencer County district
- In office November 9, 1910 – November 6, 1912
- Preceded by: Thomas Edward Chrisney
- Succeeded by: Wesley Wayne Kellams
- In office November 7, 1906 – November 4, 1908
- Preceded by: Loren Frich Gage
- Succeeded by: Thomas Edward Chrisney

Personal details
- Born: May 20, 1852 Flehingen, Germany
- Died: September 1, 1928 (aged 76) Rockport, Indiana, U.S.
- Party: Democratic
- Relatives: Archibald Stevenson (son-in-law)
- Education: Bryant and Stratton's Business College

Charles Lieb (May 20, 1852 – September 1, 1928) was an American politician who served two terms as a U.S. representative from Indiana from 1913 to 1917.

== Biography ==
Born in Flehingen, Germany, Lieb immigrated to the United States in 1868 and settled in Rockport, Indiana. He attended the public schools, the Rockport Collegiate Institute, and Bryant and Stratton's Business College, Louisville, Kentucky.

He was employed as a bookkeeper and accountant. He served as a member of the Rockport City Council 1879–1884. He engaged in the lumber business as a contractor in 1882. Lieb served as the Postmaster of Rockport 1893–1897.

=== Political career ===
He served as a member of the Indiana House of Representatives 1907–1913. He represented Spencer County.

Lieb was elected as a Democrat to the Sixty-third and Sixty-fourth Congresses (March 4, 1913 – March 3, 1917). He was not a candidate for renomination in 1916, but served as a delegate to the Democratic National Convention in 1916.

=== Later career and death ===
He served as president and director of the Farmers' Bank at Rockport, and engaged in agricultural pursuits.

He died in Rockport on September 1, 1928, and was interred in Sunset Hill Cemetery.

U.S. House of Representatives
| Preceded by John W. Boehne | Member of the U.S. House of Representatives from Indiana's 1st congressional district 1913-1917 | Succeeded by George K. Denton |
