= Jia M. Cobb =

American judge (born 1980)

Jia Cobb
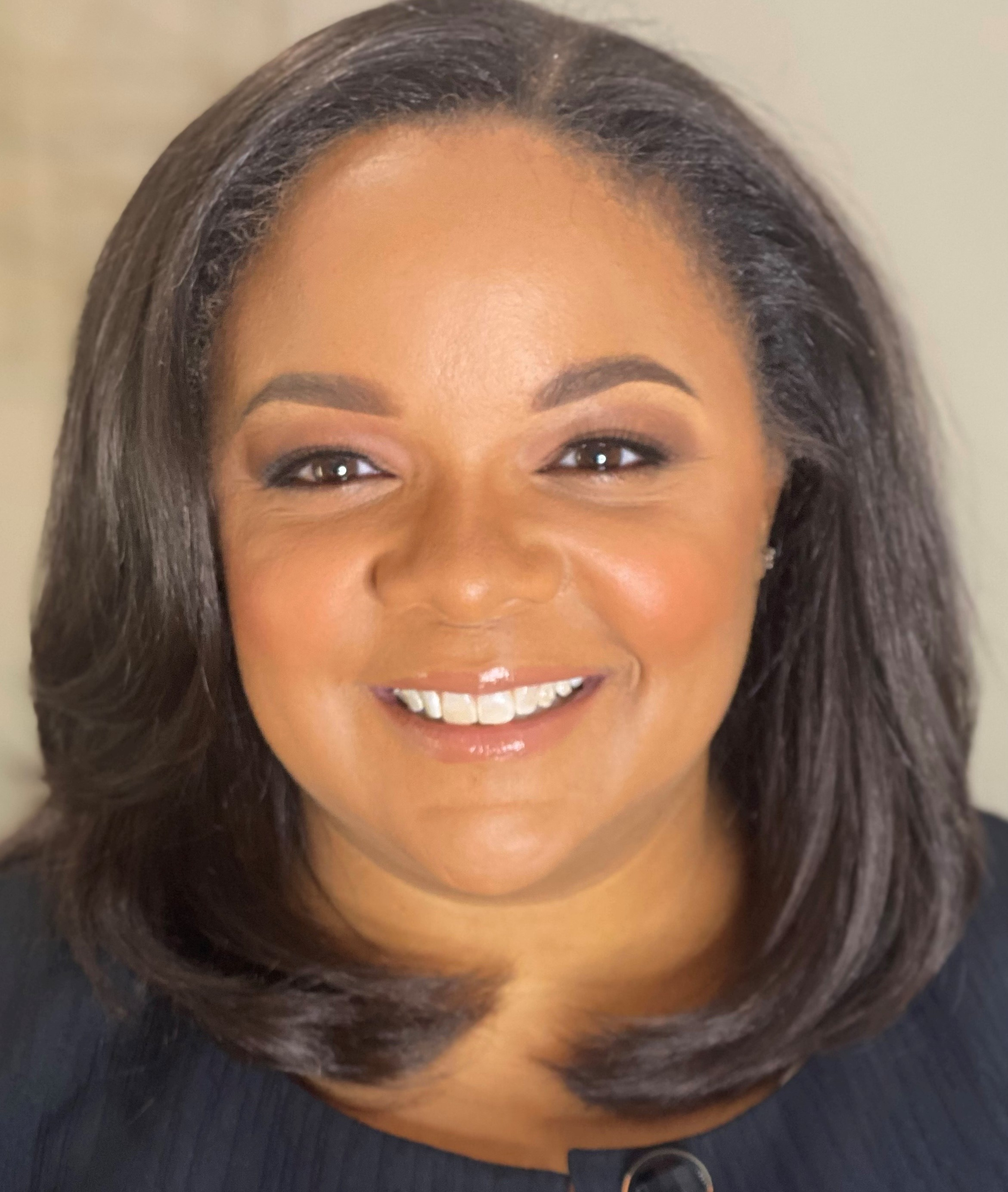

Judge of the United States District Court for the District of Columbia
- Incumbent
- Assumed office November 12, 2021
- Appointed by: Joe Biden
- Preceded by: Emmet G. Sullivan

Personal details
- Born: 1980 (age 45–46) Springfield, Ohio, U.S.
- Education: Northwestern University (BA); Harvard University (JD)

Jia Michelle Cobb (born 1980) is an American attorney serving as a United States district judge of the United States District Court for the District of Columbia. She previously worked at the law firm Relman Colfax PLLC, joining in 2012 and as a partner from 2019 to 2021.

== Early life and education ==
Cobb was born in Springfield, Ohio. After graduating from Mercy High School in Farmington Hills, Michigan, she attended Northwestern University, graduating in 2002 with a Bachelor of Arts, magna cum laude. She then attended Harvard Law School, where she was a coordinating editor of the Harvard Law Review. She graduated in 2005 with a Juris Doctor, cum laude.

== Career ==
Cobb began her career as a law clerk for Judge Diane Wood of the United States Court of Appeals for the Seventh Circuit from 2005 to 2006. Cobb was then a trial attorney for the District of Columbia Public Defender Service from 2006 to 2012. Cobb supervised incoming attorneys and was a member of the Forensic Practice Group. Cobb also taught law at the Washington College of Law and Harvard Law School. She worked as a legal partner at Relman Colfax, a national plaintiff-side civil rights law firm from 2012 to 2021. Cobb previously served as an elected member of the District of Columbia Bar's Criminal Law and Individual Rights Section Steering Committee.

=== Federal judicial service ===
On June 15, 2021, President Joe Biden nominated Cobb to serve as a United States district judge of the United States District Court for the District of Columbia. She was nominated to the seat vacated by Judge Emmet G. Sullivan, who assumed senior status on April 3, 2021. Cobb was previously recommended for the position by House Delegate Eleanor Holmes Norton. On July 14, 2021, a hearing on her nomination was held before the Senate Judiciary Committee. On August 5, 2021, her nomination was reported out of committee a 13–9 vote. On October 26, 2021, the United States Senate invoked cloture on her nomination by a 51–46 vote. Her nomination was confirmed later that day by a 52–45 vote. She received her judicial commission on November 12, 2021.

== See also ==
- List of African-American federal judges
- List of African-American jurists

Legal offices
Preceded by Emmet G. Sullivan	Judge of the United States District Court for the District of Columbia; 2021–present	Incumbent
