= Hazel Nell Dukes =

American activist (1932–2025)

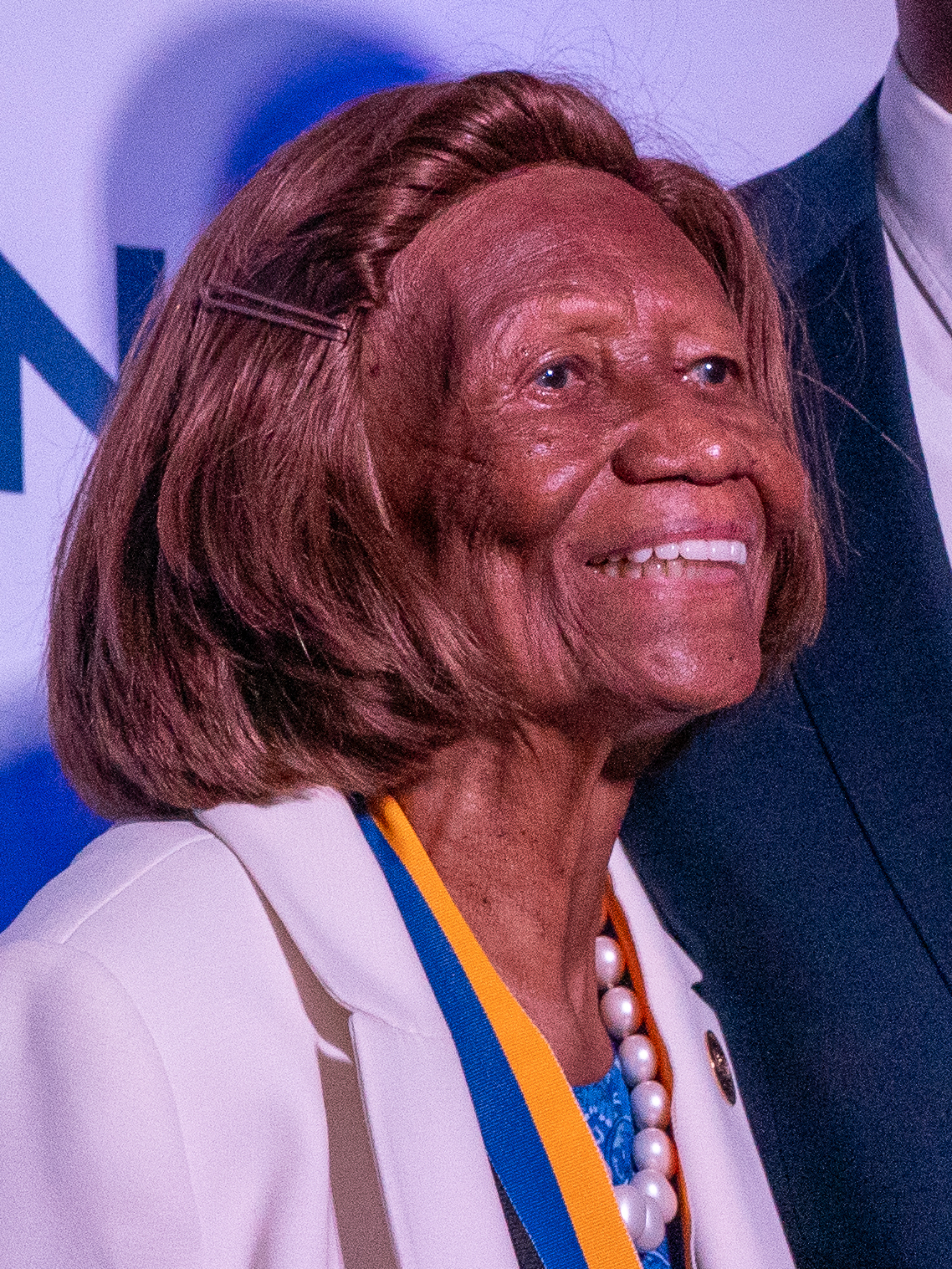
- Dukes in 2024

President of the NAACP
- In office 1990–1992
- Preceded by: Enolia McMillan
- Succeeded by: Rupert Richardson

Personal details
- Born: March 17, 1932 Montgomery, Alabama, U.S.
- Died: March 1, 2025 (aged 92) New York City, U.S.
- Children: Ronald Dukes
- Parents: Edward Dukes (father); Alice Dukes (mother)
- Education: Alabama State University; Nassau Community College; Adelphi University

Hazel Nell Dukes (March 17, 1932 – March 1, 2025) was an American activist. She served as national president of the National Association for the Advancement of Colored People (NAACP) and president of the organization's New York State chapter.

== Early life and education ==
Dukes was born in Montgomery, Alabama, on March 17, 1932. She was the only child of Alice and Edward Dukes. Her father was a Pullman porter. She enrolled at Alabama State Teachers College in 1949 hoping to become a teacher. However, after moving to New York City with her parents in 1955, she started school at Nassau Community College majoring in business administration.

In 1978, Dukes received a bachelor's degree in business administration from Adelphi University. She also completed post-graduate work at Queens College. She held three honorary doctorate degrees from the City University of New York Law School at Queens College, City University of New York's Medgar Evers College, and Touro College of Osteopathic Medicine.

== Career ==
Dukes worked to combat discrimination in housing while living in Roslyn on Long Island. She worked for President Lyndon B. Johnson's "Head Start" program in the 1960s. In 1966, she took a position at the Nassau County Attorney's Office, becoming the first Black American to do so. She eventually worked as a community organizer for the Economic Opportunity Commission of Nassau County and taught children who were living in poverty. She remained consistently outspoken throughout the Reagan and Bush presidencies during the 1980s and into the 1990s. Dukes was an advocate for education reform and the advancement of civil rights.

From 1990 to 1992, Dukes served as the national president of the National Association for the Advancement of Colored People (NAACP). Dukes was President of the NAACP New York State Conference from 1977 until her death at age 92 in 2025. She served as a member of the organization's National Board of Directors. She founded the Hazel N. Dukes & Associates consulting firm, which focused on strategic planning.

Dukes was appointed president of the New York City Off-Track Betting Corporation (NYCOTB) in 1990, twenty-five years after she had been doing social work there. Dukes was appointed head of NYCOTB by New York City Mayor David Dinkins. Rudy Giuliani, who defeated Dinkins in the 1993 New York City mayoral election, publicly condemned Dukes's management of NYCOTB, saying that the organization lost money under her leadership. In 1997, she pleaded guilty to attempted grand larceny. She admitted to stealing $13,000.00 from a disabled NYCOTB worker who had allowed her to manage the worker's credit union account while Dukes was a manager of that organization.

== Recognition and public image ==
Dukes received a Candace Award for Community Service from the National Coalition of 100 Black Women in 1990. In 2017, the Women's Black Agenda presented her with its Economic and Business Award, as part of the Congressional Black Caucus Foundation's annual conference. She was awarded the Empire State and Nation Builder Award by the New York State Association of Black and Puerto Rican Legislators, and was recognized by the New York State Senate in 2018. In 2019, a plaque honoring Dukes was placed on 137th Street and Adam Clayton Boulevard in Harlem.

In January 2023, Dukes swore in Kathy Hochul as governor of New York. In March 2023, a street in Roslyn Heights, New York, where Dukes once lived, was given the honorary name of "Dr. Hazel Dukes Way".

In August 2023, former secretary of state Hillary Clinton presented Dukes with the Spingarn Medal, the highest honor conveyed by the NAACP.

== Death ==
Dukes died in Harlem, New York City on March 1, 2025, at the age of 92.
