= F. Dickinson Letts =

U.S. Congressman and federal judge

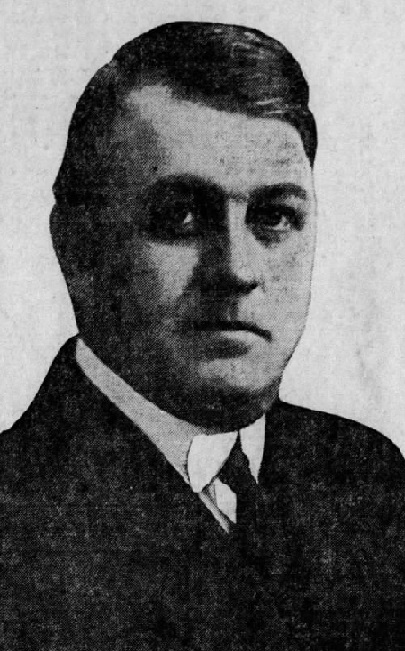
- From a November 1924 Republican Party ad published in the Davenport, Iowa Daily Times.

Senior Judge of the United States District Court for the District of Columbia
- In office May 31, 1961 – January 19, 1965

Chief Judge of the United States District Court for the District of Columbia
- In office 1958–1959
- Preceded by: Bolitha James Laws
- Succeeded by: David Andrew Pine

Judge of the United States District Court for the District of Columbia
- In office May 5, 1931 – May 31, 1961
- Appointed by: Herbert Hoover
- Preceded by: Wendell Phillips Stafford
- Succeeded by: William Blakely Jones

Member of the U.S. House of Representatives from Iowa's 2nd district
- In office March 4, 1925 – March 3, 1931
- Preceded by: Harry E. Hull
- Succeeded by: Bernhard M. Jacobsen

Personal details
- Born: Fred Dickinson Letts; April 26, 1875 Ainsworth, Iowa, U.S.
- Died: January 19, 1965 (aged 89) Washington, D.C., U.S.
- Resting place: Ainsworth Cemetery; Ainsworth, Iowa
- Party: Republican
- Relatives: Lester J. Dickinson
- Education: Parsons College (B.S.); University of Iowa College of Law (LL.B.)

Fred Dickinson Letts (April 26, 1875 – January 19, 1965) was a United States representative from Iowa and a United States district judge of the United States District Court for the District of Columbia.

== Education and career ==
Born on April 26, 1875, in Ainsworth, Washington County, Iowa, Letts attended the common schools of Washington County. He attended Columbia University, then received a Bachelor of Science degree in 1897 from Parsons College in Fairfield, Iowa, and a Bachelor of Laws in 1899 from the University of Iowa College of Law and was admitted to the bar that year. He entered private practice in Davenport, Iowa, from 1899 to 1911, returning briefly to private practice from 1912 to 1914. He was a Judge of the Iowa District Court for the Second Judicial District from 1911 to 1912 and 1914 to 1925.

== Congressional service ==
Letts was elected as a Republican from Iowa's 2nd congressional district to the United States House of Representatives of the 69th, 70th, and 71st United States Congresses, serving from March 4, 1925, until March 3, 1931. He was unsuccessful in his reelection bid in 1930 to the 72nd United States Congress.

== Federal judicial service ==
Letts received a recess appointment from President Herbert Hoover on May 5, 1931, to an Associate Justice seat on the Supreme Court of the District of Columbia (Associate Justice of the District Court of the United States for the District of Columbia from June 25, 1936, Judge of the United States District Court for the District of Columbia from June 25, 1948) vacated by Associate Justice Wendell Philips Stafford. President Hoover nominated him to the same position on December 15, 1931. He was confirmed by the United States Senate on February 17, 1932, and received his commission on February 20, 1932. He served as Chief Judge from 1958 to 1959. He assumed senior status on May 31, 1961. His service terminated on January 19, 1965, due to his death in Washington, D.C. He was interred in Ainsworth Cemetery in Ainsworth, Iowa.

== Family ==
Letts was a cousin of former Iowa United States Senator and United States Representative Lester J. Dickinson of Algona, Iowa, who also served in the United States House of Representatives during Lett's two terms.

== Sources ==
- United States Congress. "Fred Dickinson Letts (id: L000258)". Biographical Directory of the United States Congress.

U.S. House of Representatives
Preceded by Harry E. Hull	Member of the U.S. House of Representatives from Iowa's 2nd congressional district 1925–1931	Succeeded by Bernhard M. Jacobsen
Legal offices
Preceded by Wendell Phillips Stafford	Judge of the United States District Court for the District of Columbia; 1931–1961	Succeeded by William Blakely Jones
Preceded by Bolitha James Laws	Chief Judge of the United States District Court for the District of Columbia; 1958–1959	Succeeded by David Andrew Pine
