= Gate of Heaven Cemetery (Silver Spring, Maryland) =

Roman Catholic cemetery in Silver Spring, Maryland, US

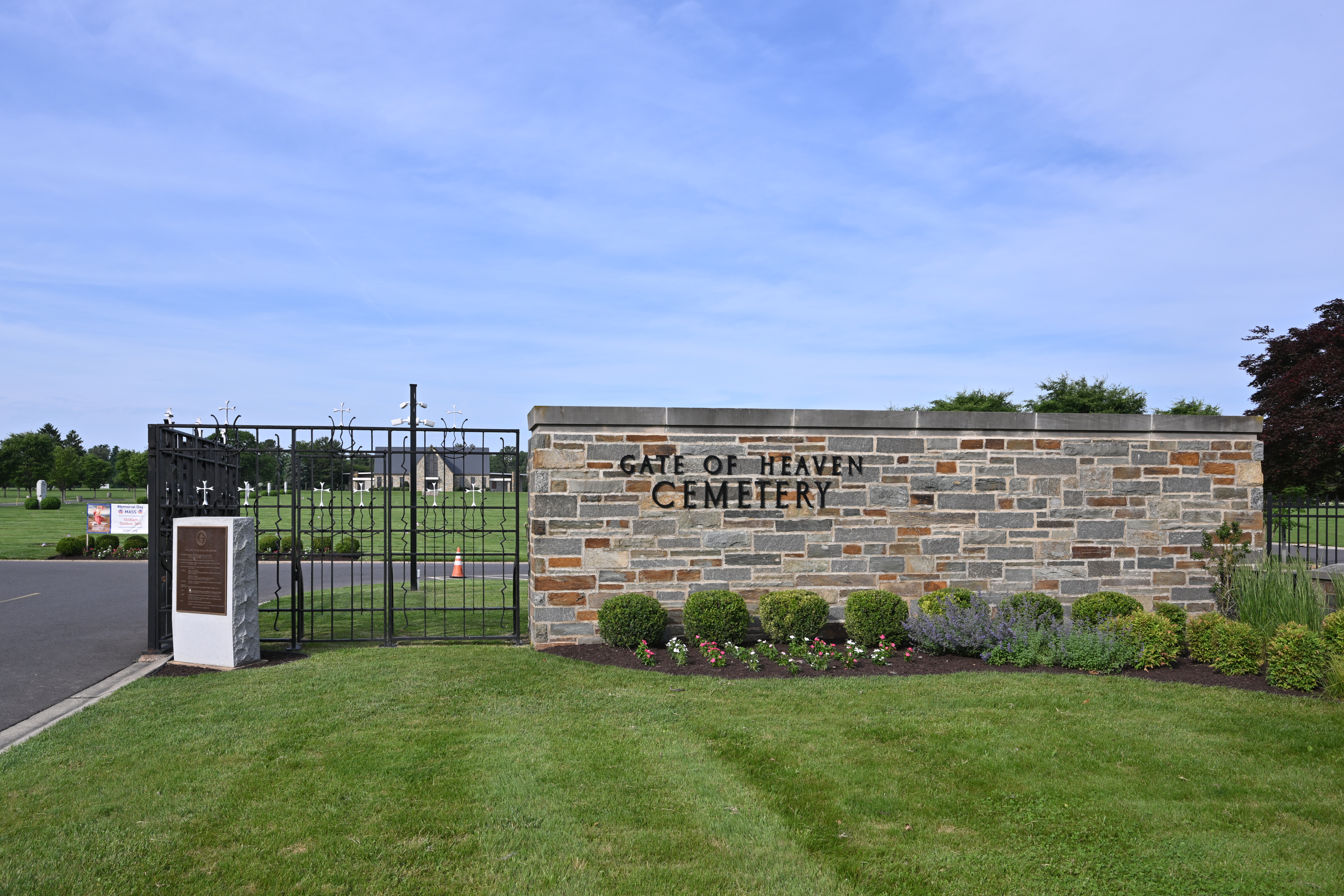
- Interactive map of Gate of Heaven Cemetery

Details
- Established: June 17, 1956; 70 years ago
- Location: Aspen Hill; 13801 Georgia Avenue, Silver Spring, Maryland 20906
- Country: United States
- Coordinates: 39°04′59″N 77°04′26″W
- Type: Roman Catholic
- Style: Traditional lawn
- Owned by: Catholic Cemeteries of the Archdiocese of Washington, Inc.
- Size: 92 acres (37.23 ha) Map
- Website: www.ccaw.org/gate-of-heaven-cemetery
- Find a Grave: Gate of Heaven Cemetery
- The Political Graveyard: Gate of Heaven Cemetery
- Footnotes: "Gate of Heaven Cemetery". Geographic Names Information System. United States Geological Survey, United States Department of the Interior. September 12, 1979.

Gate of Heaven Cemetery is a cemetery located in the Aspen Hill section of Silver Spring, Maryland, in the United States. It is operated and maintained by the Catholic Cemeteries of the Archdiocese of Washington, Inc. At the time of the cemetery's consecration in 1956, it was the first Roman Catholic archdiocesan cemetery to open in the Washington metropolitan area in 70 years. The grounds of Gate of Heaven Cemetery are centered around a series of internal roads and pathways, which in combination, form the shape of the Latin Cross.

== About the cemetery ==
The District of Columbia was founded in 1791, and initially several small Roman Catholic cemeteries were established in the city. The last of these, St. Mary's Catholic Cemetery on Lincoln Road NE, was organized in 1870. Despite the rapid growth in the city's population during the next 70 years, no new Catholic cemeteries were organized within the Archdiocese of Washington. The Right Reverend Monsignor Edward L. Buckley of the Cathedral of St. Matthew the Apostle was aware of the need to plan ahead, however, and began advocating for the purchase of land for a new burying ground. In 1928, the Catholic Cemetery Association, a private, nonprofit organization, which purchased land for the creation of Catholic cemeteries, purchased 92 acres (37.23 hectares) of land from the Rabbitt family in Montgomery County, Maryland. The intent was to name the new cemetery "New Mount Olivet," after its District of Columbia–located Mount Olivet Cemetery, although no name was ever formally adopted.

By 1955, it was clear that a new cemetery was sorely needed in the Archdiocese of Washington. The Catholic Cemetery Association transferred its title to this land to the archdiocese, and a new cemetery, named Gate of Heaven, was established. Gate of Heaven Cemetery was laid out around a 10-acre (4.05 ha) roadway which was designed in the shape of a cruciform and was lined with trees. Four roughly rectangular sections extend from each side of this cruciform-shaped roadway. Life-size Stations of the Cross were placed at intervals in this central section. All of the roadways were named for saints, and numerous shrines to saints were spread amongst the cemetery's 28 sections. A 100-seat chapel was constructed at the center of the cruciform-shaped roadway. The cemetery's main gate is particularly notable. It features large wrought iron gates set in masonry pylons 10 feet (3.05 metres) high and 30 feet (9.14 metres) wide. Just inside and to the right of the main gate was a small caretaker's cottage made of stone. The cemetery was dedicated on June 17, 1956, by the Most Reverend Patrick O'Boyle, Archbishop of Washington.

Gate of Heaven Cemetery began receiving interments at the beginning of July 1956.

== Cemetery grounds ==
The perimeter of Gate of Heaven Cemetery is bounded by Georgia Avenue, to the southwest; Connecticut Avenue, to the northwest; Peppertree Lane, Strathmore Local Park, and Strathmore Elementary School, to the northeast; and the Aspen Manor Shopping Center, Beret Neighborhood Conservation Area, and Beret and Bustleton lanes, to the southeast. A portion of the northeast corner of the cemetery was sold in the 1960s or 1970s to the state of Maryland, as a means of raising funds for the trust account that maintains the cemetery. Strathmore Local Park and Strathmore Elementary School were constructed on this land. Gate of Heaven Cemetery only used about half of its acreage when it opened in 1956, and only in the late 1990s began expanding onto its unused land.

Gate of Heaven Cemetery is a traditional lawn cemetery. The burial area is a lawn, with trees and shrubs around the perimeter. Most gravestones are flush with the earth, with only a few above-ground memorials. The cemetery also has several mausoleums for interment, as well as several columbaria.

In addition, Gate of Heaven staff administer St. John's Cemetery, located on the grounds of St. John the Evangelist Parish's Saint John the Evangelist Historic Church, at 9700 Rosensteel Avenue, in the Forest Glen section of Silver Spring.

== Notable interments ==
- John Miller Baer (1886–1970) – member of the House of Representatives from North Dakota (1917–21); cartoonist and journalist.
- Rep. John Bonifas Bennett (1904–1964) – member of the House of Representatives from Michigan, 1943–45 and 1947–64. Died while still in office, on August 9, 1964, in Chevy Chase, Maryland.
- James B. Carey (1911–1973) – labor leader, president of the United Electrical and Machine Workers (1936–41) and president (1950–65) of the International Union of Electrical Workers.
- Jim Castiglia (1918–2007) – American football fullback for the Washington Redskins, the Philadelphia Eagles, and the Baltimore Colts
- Al DeMao (1920–2008) – college and professional football legend and one of the "70 Greatest" players for the Washington Redskins.
- James Leo "Jim" Gibbons (1913–2001) – noted Washington, D.C., and Maryland broadcaster, "voice" of the Washington Redskins on radio and television for 23 years, and ABC Radio Network "Game of the Week" play-by-play announcer.
- Eric G. Hall (1922–1998) – Burmese-Pakistani retired Air Vice Marshal, moved to the United States in 1980 and resided in Maryland until his death.
- Augustus Hawkins (1907–2007) – prominent American Congressman, wrote Title VII of the Civil Rights Act of 1964 and the 1978 Humphrey-Hawkins Full Employment Act
- Joe Judge (1894–1963) – Major League Baseball player for the Washington Senators.
- Alphonse "Tuffy" Leemans (1912–1979) – Pro Football Hall of Fame inductee and football player for the New York Giants.
- Judge Charles Francis McLaughlin (1887–1976) – member of the House of Representatives from Nebraska (1935–43) and senior United States district court judge for the District of Columbia (1964–74).
- George Meany (1894–1980) – president of the American Federation of Labor (1952–55) and the AFL–CIO (1955–79).
- Robert Novak (1931–2009) – syndicated columnist, journalist, television personality, author, and conservative political commentator
- John Joseph O'Connor (1885–1960) – member of the House of Representatives from New York (1923–39), and practitioner of law in New York City and Washington, D.C.
- Joseph P. O'Hara (1895–1975) – member of the House of Representatives from Minnesota
- Jim Oberstar (1934–2014) – the longest-serving member ever of the United States House of Representatives from the state of Minnesota
- Guy Prather (1958–2016) – linebacker who played five seasons with the Green Bay Packers.
- James M. Quigley (1918–2011) – member of the House of Representatives from Pennsylvania.
- Margaret Schweinhaut (1903–1997) – member of the Maryland House of Delegates (1955–61) and Maryland Senate (1961–63, 1967–91)
- Judge John J. Sirica (1904–1992) – judge who presided over the Watergate scandal trials.
- Gerald Thomas Smith (1943–1986) A professional American football tight end for the National Football League's Washington Redskins for 13 seasons, from 1965 through 1977.
- Mattie J.T. Stepanek (1990–2004) – best-selling teenage poet and author who suffered from a rare form of muscular dystrophy (dysautonomic mitochondrial myopathy).
- Alan G. Whicher (1954–1995) – Secret Service employee, victim of the Oklahoma City Bombing.

== Bibliography ==
- United States. Congress; Dodge, Andrew R.; Koed, Betty K. (2005). Dodge, Andrew R.; Koed, Betty K. (eds.). Biographical Directory of the United States Congress: 1774–2005 (PDF). House document (United States. Congress. House), 108–222. Vol. 14902 of United States congressional serial set. United States. Congress. Joint Committee on Printing. Washington, D.C.: U.S. G.P.O. ISBN 978-0160731761. OCLC 63049058. GPO LPS69614.
- Franscell, Ron (2012). The Crime Buff's Guide to Outlaw Washington, D.C. Crime Buff's Guides. Lanham, Maryland: Globe Pequot Press. ISBN 978-0762788705. OCLC 890531057. 1781759 – via Google Books.
- Spencer, Thomas E. (1998). Where they're buried : a directory containing more than twenty thousand names of notable persons buried in American cemeteries, with listings of many prominent people who were cremated. Baltimore, Maryland: Clearfield Company. p. 339. ISBN 978-0806348230. OCLC 632317843 – via Internet Archive. "Gate of Heaven Cemetery Silver Spring."
