= Thomas Aquinas Flannery =

American judge (1918–2007)

Senior Judge of the United States District Court for the District of Columbia
- In office May 10, 1985 – September 20, 2007

Judge of the United States District Court for the District of Columbia
- In office December 6, 1971 – May 10, 1985
- Appointed by: Richard Nixon
- Preceded by: Leonard Patrick Walsh
- Succeeded by: George Hughes Revercomb

40th United States Attorney for the District of Columbia
- In office 1969–1971
- Appointed by: Richard Nixon
- Preceded by: David G. Bress
- Succeeded by: Harold H. Titus Jr.

Personal details
- Born: Thomas Aquinas Flannery; May 10, 1918 Washington, D.C.
- Died: September 20, 2007 (aged 89) Washington, D.C.
- Party: Republican
- Education: Columbus School of Law (LL.B.)

Thomas Aquinas Flannery (May 10, 1918 – September 20, 2007) was a United States district judge of the United States District Court for the District of Columbia.

== Education and career ==
Born in Washington, D.C., Flannery received a Bachelor of Laws from the Columbus School of Law at the Catholic University of America in 1940. He was in private practice in Washington, D.C. from 1940 to 1942, and was then in the United States Army Air Forces during World War II, from 1942 to 1945, returning to private practice in Washington, D.C. from 1945 to 1948. He was a trial attorney at the United States Department of Justice in Washington, D.C. from 1948 to 1950, and an Assistant United States Attorney for the District of Columbia from 1950 to 1962. He again returned to private practice in Washington, D.C. from 1962 to 1969, and was the United States Attorney for the District of Columbia from 1969 to 1971.

== Federal judicial service ==
On November 18, 1971, Flannery was nominated by President Richard Nixon to a seat on the United States District Court for the District of Columbia vacated by Judge Leonard Patrick Walsh. Flannery was confirmed by the United States Senate on December 1, 1971, and received his commission on December 6, 1971. He assumed senior status on May 10, 1985, serving in that capacity until his death on September 20, 2007, in Washington, D.C.

== Recognition ==
Since 2009 the D.C. Bar has sponsored an annual Thomas A. Flannery lecture. Speakers have included Supreme Court justices Antonin Scalia and Ruth Bader Ginsburg.

== Sources ==
Legal offices
Preceded by Leonard Patrick Walsh	Judge of the United States District Court for the District of Columbia; 1971–1985	Succeeded by George Hughes Revercomb
