= Henry Albert Schweinhaut =

American judge

Senior Judge of the United States District Court for the District of Columbia
- In office November 16, 1956 – June 22, 1970

Judge of the United States District Court for the District of Columbia
- In office December 19, 1944 – November 16, 1956
- Appointed by: Franklin D. Roosevelt
- Preceded by: Oscar Raymond Luhring
- Succeeded by: John Sirica

Personal details
- Born: Henry Albert Schweinhaut; February 9, 1902 Washington, D.C., U.S.
- Died: June 22, 1970 (aged 68)
- Spouse: Margaret Schweinhaut
- Education: National University Law School (LL.B.)

Henry Albert Schweinhaut (February 9, 1902 – June 22, 1970) was a United States district judge of the United States District Court for the District of Columbia.

== Education and career ==
Born in Washington, D.C., Schweinhaut received a Bachelor of Laws from that city's National University Law School (now George Washington University Law School) in 1924. He was in private practice in Washington, D.C. from 1924 to 1934. He was a lecturer on evidence and agency for the Washington College of Law at American University from 1932 to 1939. He was an Assistant United States Attorney for the District of Columbia from 1934 to 1936. He was a special assistant to the Attorney General of the United States from 1936 to 1945. He was a lecturer on evidence for the Columbus School of Law at the Catholic University of America from 1944 to 1948.

== Federal judicial service ==
Schweinhaut was nominated by President Franklin D. Roosevelt on November 21, 1944, to an Associate Justice seat on the District Court of the United States for the District of Columbia (Judge of the United States District Court for the District of Columbia from June 25, 1948) vacated by Associate Justice Oscar Raymond Luhring. He was confirmed by the United States Senate on December 13, 1944, and received his commission on December 19, 1944. He assumed senior status due to a certified disability on November 16, 1956. His service terminated on June 22, 1970, due to his death.

== Family ==
Schweinhaut was married to Margaret Schweinhaut.

== Sources ==
Legal offices
Preceded by Oscar Raymond Luhring	Judge of the United States District Court for the District of Columbia; 1944–1956	Succeeded by John Sirica
