= Leonard Patrick Walsh =

American judge

Senior Judge of the United States District Court for the District of Columbia
- In office October 5, 1971 – February 13, 1980

Judge of the United States District Court for the District of Columbia
- In office September 14, 1959 – October 5, 1971
- Appointed by: Dwight D. Eisenhower
- Preceded by: Bolitha James Laws
- Succeeded by: Thomas Aquinas Flannery

Personal details
- Born: Leonard Patrick Walsh; March 10, 1904 Superior, Wisconsin, U.S.
- Died: February 13, 1980 (aged 75)
- Education: George Washington University Law School (LL.B.)

Leonard Patrick Walsh (March 10, 1904 – February 13, 1980) was a United States district judge of the United States District Court for the District of Columbia.

== Education and career ==
Born in Superior, Wisconsin, Walsh received a Bachelor of Laws from National University Law School (now George Washington University Law School) in Washington, D.C. in 1933. He was in private practice in Washington, D.C., from 1933 to 1953. He was Chief Judge of the Municipal Court for the District of Columbia from 1953 to 1959. He was a professorial lecturer for George Washington University Law School from 1956 to 1964.

== Federal judicial service ==
Walsh was nominated by President Dwight D. Eisenhower on February 26, 1959, to a seat on the United States District Court for the District of Columbia vacated by Judge Bolitha James Laws. He was confirmed by the United States Senate on September 9, 1959, and received his commission on September 14, 1959. He assumed senior status due to a certified disability on October 5, 1971. His service terminated on February 13, 1980, due to his death.

== Sources ==
Legal offices
| Preceded by Bolitha James Laws | Judge of the United States District Court for the District of Columbia; 1959–1971 | Succeeded by Thomas Aquinas Flannery |
