= George H. Revercomb =

American judge

Judge of the United States District Court for the District of Columbia
- In office December 17, 1985 – August 1, 1993
- Appointed by: Ronald Reagan
- Preceded by: Thomas Aquinas Flannery
- Succeeded by: James Robertson

Associate Judge of the Superior Court of the District of Columbia
- In office October 20, 1970 – December 17, 1985
- Appointed by: Richard Nixon
- Preceded by: Position established
- Succeeded by: Evelyn Crawford Queen

United States Principal Associate Deputy Attorney General
- In office February 14, 1969 – October 20, 1970
- President: Richard Nixon

Personal details
- Born: George Hughes Revercomb; June 3, 1929 Charleston, West Virginia, United States
- Died: August 1, 1993 (aged 64) Washington, D.C., United States
- Resting place: Oak Hill Cemetery
- Parent: Chapman Revercomb (father)
- Education: Princeton University (AB); University of Virginia School of Law (JD, LLM)

Military service
- Branch/service: United States Air Force
- Years of service: 1951–1953
- Battles/wars: Korean War

George Hughes Revercomb (June 3, 1929 – August 1, 1993) was a United States district judge of the United States District Court for the District of Columbia.

== Education and career ==
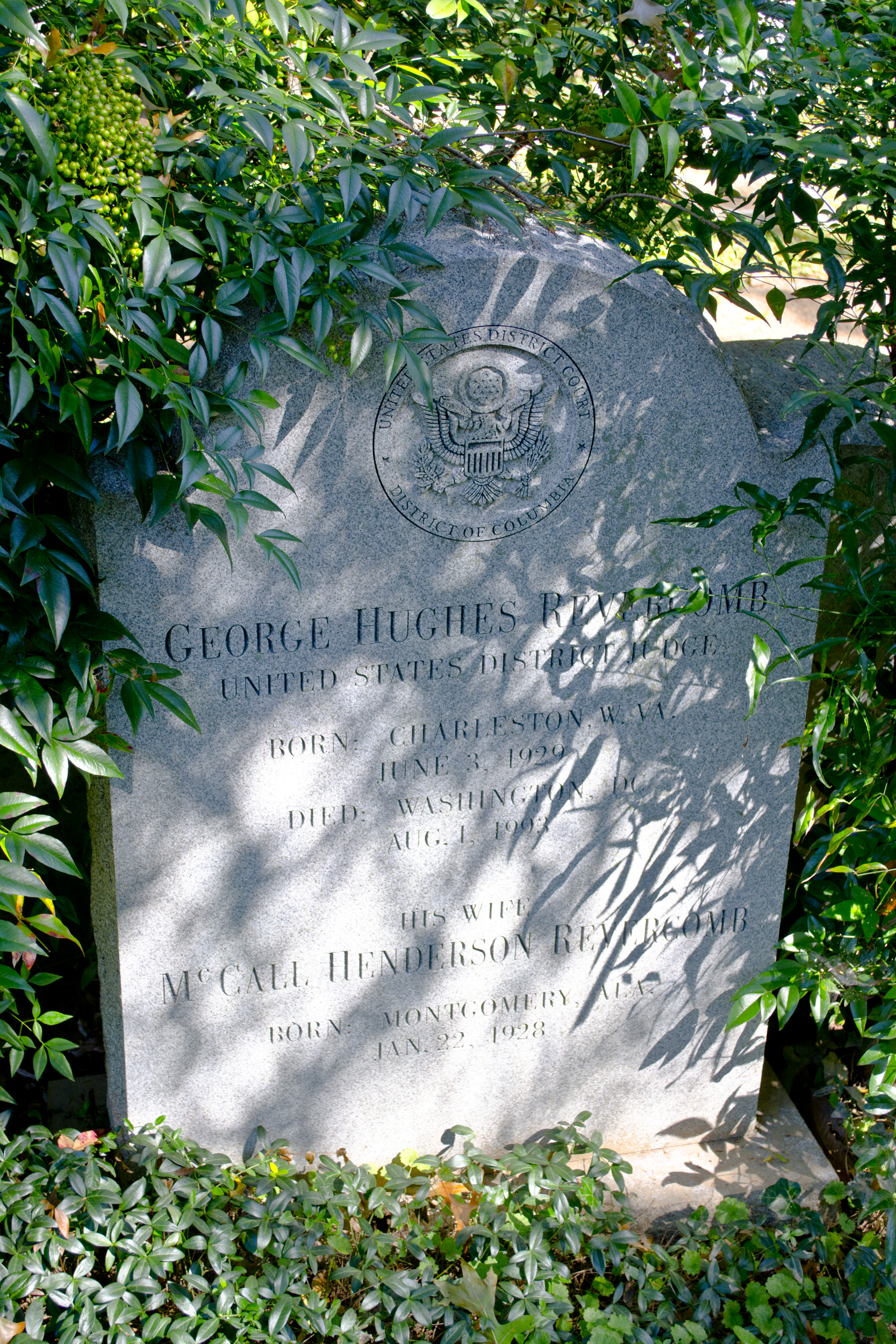
Grave of Revercomb at Oak Hill Cemetery (Washington, D.C.)

Born in Charleston, West Virginia, Revercomb received an Artium Baccalaureus degree from Princeton University in 1950. He was in the United States Air Force from 1951 to 1953, and received a Juris Doctor from the University of Virginia School of Law in 1955. Revercomb was a legal assistant for the Federal Communications Commission in Washington, D.C. from 1958 to 1959. He was in private practice in Norfolk, Virginia from 1961 to 1962. He was in private practice in Roanoke, Virginia from 1955 to 1956, then in Charleston, West Virginia from 1956 to 1961, and in Washington, D.C. from 1962 to 1969. Revercomb was an associate deputy United States Attorney General of the United States Department of Justice from 1969 to 1970. He was an Associate Judge of the Superior Court of the District of Columbia from 1970 to 1985. He received a Master of Laws from the University of Virginia School of Law in 1982, at age 53.

== Federal judicial service ==
On November 7, 1985, Revercomb was nominated by President Ronald Reagan to a seat on the United States District Court for the District of Columbia vacated by Judge Thomas Aquinas Flannery. Revercomb was confirmed by the United States Senate on December 16, 1985, and received his commission on December 17, 1985. Revercomb served in that capacity until his death of cancer, in Washington, D.C., on August 1, 1993, at the age of 64. He was buried in Oak Hill Cemetery (Washington, D.C.).

== Sources ==
Legal offices
Preceded by Thomas Aquinas Flannery	Judge of the United States District Court for the District of Columbia; 1985–1993	Succeeded by James Robertson
