= Benjamin Franklin University =

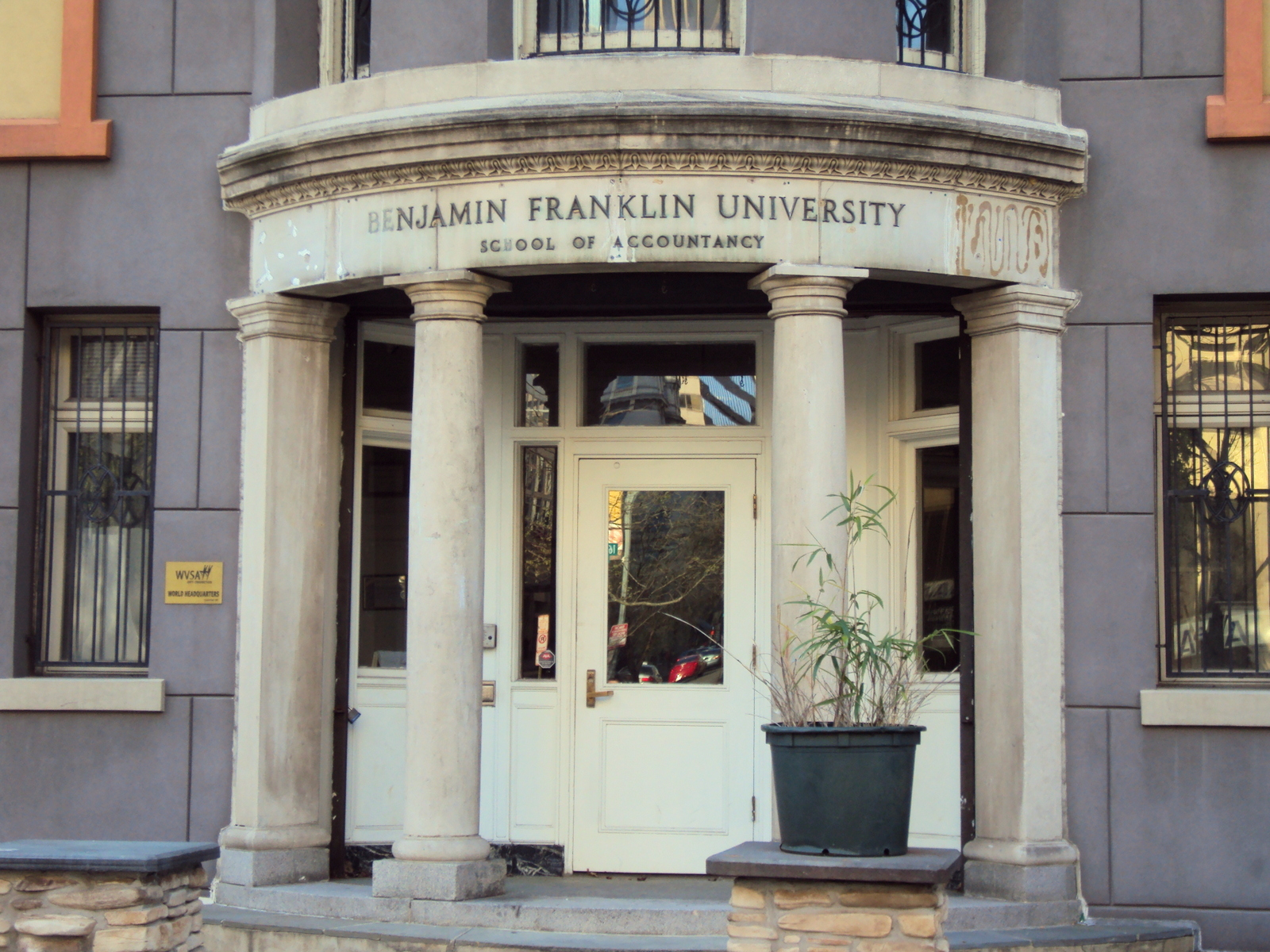
- Benjamin Franklin University School of Accountancy
- Type: Private
- Active: August 17, 1925–August 1987
- Location: Washington, D.C., United States; 38.903939°N 77.036951°W

Benjamin Franklin University was founded in Washington, D.C., on August 17, 1925. It was the successor to the Washington campus of Pace University, which had been established in 1907. The university has since closed and is now operated by the George Washington University.

The founding principles of Benjamin Franklin University were based upon Benjamin Franklin's doctrine of thrift and self-reliance. The university was especially adapted toward nontraditional students who had full-time employment during the day. The school gave adult learners the opportunity to earn a bachelor's degree in commercial science after three years of classes in accountancy and business administration. The university also offered master's degrees in commercial science to graduate students. Some classes were taught with a stereopticon, a type of slide projector, to show students manufacturing processing, forms, labor-saving accounting devices, and graphic cost presentations. The first day of classes was September 15, 1925. Classes were held at 17th and H streets NW.

The university's first graduating class was twenty percent female, but the university prohibited black students from enrolling until 1964, when picketing by civil rights leaders forced the university to open its admissions.

By 1981, the university was offering bachelor's and master's degrees in accountancy and financial management, and its classes were being held at 1100 16th Street NW. A few years later, the District of Columbia's accountancy board imposed new requirements, and the school determined that it would need to add more liberal arts courses and more full-time faculty members in order to meet the new requirements, which would be more than it could afford to do. In August 1987, Benjamin Franklin University closed. At the time of its closing, the school had graduated about 8,000 students. Students were allowed to enroll at the George Washington University at reduced tuition. Benjamin Franklin University donated $900,000 in investments, books, and equipment to the George Washington University.

The Benjamin Franklin University records are currently housed by the George Washington University Special Collections Research Center in the Estelle and Melvin Gelman Library.

== Other university of same name ==
Benjamin Franklin University, located in Annandale, Virginia, was open from 1995 to 1999 but had its name revoked by the State Council of Higher Education for Virginia.
