= Louis F. Oberdorfer =

American judge

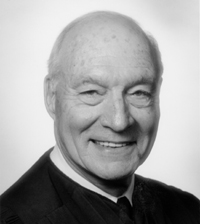

Senior Judge of the United States District Court for the District of Columbia
- In office July 31, 1992 – February 21, 2013

Judge of the United States District Court for the District of Columbia
- In office October 11, 1977 – July 31, 1992
- Appointed by: Jimmy Carter
- Preceded by: William Blakely Jones
- Succeeded by: Emmet G. Sullivan

Personal details
- Born: Louis Falk Oberdorfer; February 21, 1919 Birmingham, Alabama, U.S.
- Died: February 21, 2013 (aged 94) McLean, Virginia, U.S.
- Education: Dartmouth College (BA); Yale University (LLB)

Louis Falk Oberdorfer (February 21, 1919 – February 21, 2013) was a United States district judge of the United States District Court for the District of Columbia.

== Early life and education ==
Oberdorfer was born in Birmingham, Alabama, to A. Leo Oberdorfer, an attorney and author, and Stella Falk Oberdorfer. His family was Jewish. He graduated from Dartmouth College with a Bachelor of Arts degree in 1939. He then attended Yale Law School from 1939 until fall 1941, when he was drafted to serve in the United States Army. After four years of military service during World War II, he returned to Yale and graduated with a Bachelor of Laws in 1946. Oberdorfer served as a law clerk for United States Supreme Court Justice Hugo L. Black, an Alabamian who had been a friend and law colleague of Oberdorfer's father.

== Professional career ==
After working as Justice Black's sole law clerk from 1946 to 1947, Oberdorfer went into private practice in Washington, D.C., with the firm Paul, Weiss, Wharton & Garrison as a tax attorney until his friend and law school classmate deputy attorney general Byron White asked him to join the United States Justice Department in 1961. He was appointed assistant attorney general of the Tax Division but, because the division was well organized and largely self-sustaining, he focused his energies on other law-related issues, particularly civil rights. During this time he befriended attorney general Robert F. Kennedy.

Oberdorfer returned to private practice in 1965 with Wilmer, Cutler, & Pickering. In 1968, Oberdorfer was elected co-chairman of the Lawyers' Committee for Civil Rights Under Law. He served as president of the District of Columbia Bar Association from 1977 to 1978. When Griffin Bell became attorney general in 1977, Oberdorfer was considered for the deputy position but was instead appointed to the federal bench.

== Federal judicial service ==
Oberdorfer was nominated by President Jimmy Carter on September 16, 1977, to a seat on the United States District Court for the District of Columbia vacated by Judge William Blakely Jones. He was confirmed by the United States Senate on October 7, 1977, and received his commission on October 11, 1977. He assumed senior status on July 31, 1992. His service terminated on February 21, 2013, due to his death. As a judge, Oberdorfer opposed mandatory sentencing policies, especially with respect to drug offenders. He taught part-time at Georgetown Law Center from 1993 until his death.

== Death ==
Oberdorfer died at his home in McLean, Virginia on his 94th birthday, February 21, 2013.

== See also ==
- List of law clerks for the first seat of the Supreme Court of the United States

== Sources ==
Legal offices
Preceded by William Blakely Jones	Judge of the United States District Court for the District of Columbia; 1977–1992	Succeeded by Emmet G. Sullivan
