= James A. Washington Jr. =

American judge

James Aaron Washington Jr. (circa 1915 – August 29, 1998) was a Judge of the Superior Court of the District of Columbia from 1971 to 1984. He was also a professor and dean of the law school at Howard University. An expert on civil rights litigation, he helped in the formulation of the Supreme Court case Bolling vs. Sharpe that outlawed racial segregation in District of Columbia public schools.

== Early life and career ==
He was born in Asheville, North Carolina. He received a bachelor's degree from Howard in 1936 and a law degree in 1939, followed by a Master of Laws degree from Harvard University in 1941. He worked in the War Division of the U.S. Department of Justice during World War II, then returned to Howard as a professor of law in 1946. In 1966 he was named John Mercer Langston Professor of Law, and in 1969 he became dean of the law school.

He was named to the Superior Court in 1971 by President Richard Nixon. He was severely injured in 1976 when a fall broke his neck, but returned to the bench in a wheelchair in 1977 and served until his retirement in 1984.

Having extensive experience in civil rights legislation, he worked for the National Association for the Advancement of Colored People (NAACP) during the 1940s and 1950s to advance their goal of overturning the 1896 Supreme Court decision Plessy v. Ferguson, which had legalized segregation of public facilities by race under the doctrine of "separate but equal". He helped to prepare legal arguments and advised the NAACP teams that were drawing up briefs, testing presentations, and holding moot court exercises. This work eventually culminated in the 1954 Supreme Court decision in Brown vs. Board of Education, which found that racially segregated schools were unconstitutional because they were "inherently unequal."

== Personal life and death ==
He was married to Ada Collins Washington for 51 years until her death in 1987. They had four daughters and four sons. He died at his home in Silver Spring, Maryland on August 29, 1998.
