= Master of Counselling =

The Master of Counselling or Master of Counseling (MC, M.C., M.Coun., or M.Couns.) is a postgraduate professional degree. The degree prepares students for professional practice as counsellors or counselling psychologists in mental health clinics, community organizations, schools, post-secondary educational institutions, employee assistance programs, and private practice. Students typically choose a specialization, such as counselling psychology, school counselling, marital & couples counselling, career counselling, or art therapy.

== Country-specific information ==
=== Australia ===
A number of Australian universities, including University of Notre Dame Australia, La Trobe University, The University of Queensland, Victoria University, Monash University, and Curtin University, offer a Master of Counselling degree.

=== Canada ===
The degree is awarded by a number of Canadian universities such as the University of Calgary, the University of Lethbridge, and Athabasca University. The degree meets academic requirements to attain registration as a Canadian Certified Counsellor (CCC) with the Canadian Counselling and Psychotherapy Association or Registered Psychologist (R.Psych) in certain Canadian provinces, including Alberta.

=== New Zealand ===
The University of Waikato offers a Master of Counselling degree.

=== United Kingdom ===
The University of Edinburgh offers a Master of Counselling (Interpersonal Dialogue) as a two-year full-time course.

=== United States ===
Idaho State University is one of the top United States institutions offering a Master of Counseling (M.Coun.) degree with a one "L" in US spelling. Students have the option of obtaining a degree specialization in one of the following areas: School Counseling; Clinical Mental Health Counseling; Marriage, Couple, and Family Counseling; Student Affairs Counseling; or Clinical Rehabilitation Counseling.

Arizona State University is another United States institution offering a Master of Counseling (M.C.) degree with a one "L" in US spelling, with a degree specialization in Mental Health Counseling.
