= Timothy Shea =

American lawyer and acting DEA administrator

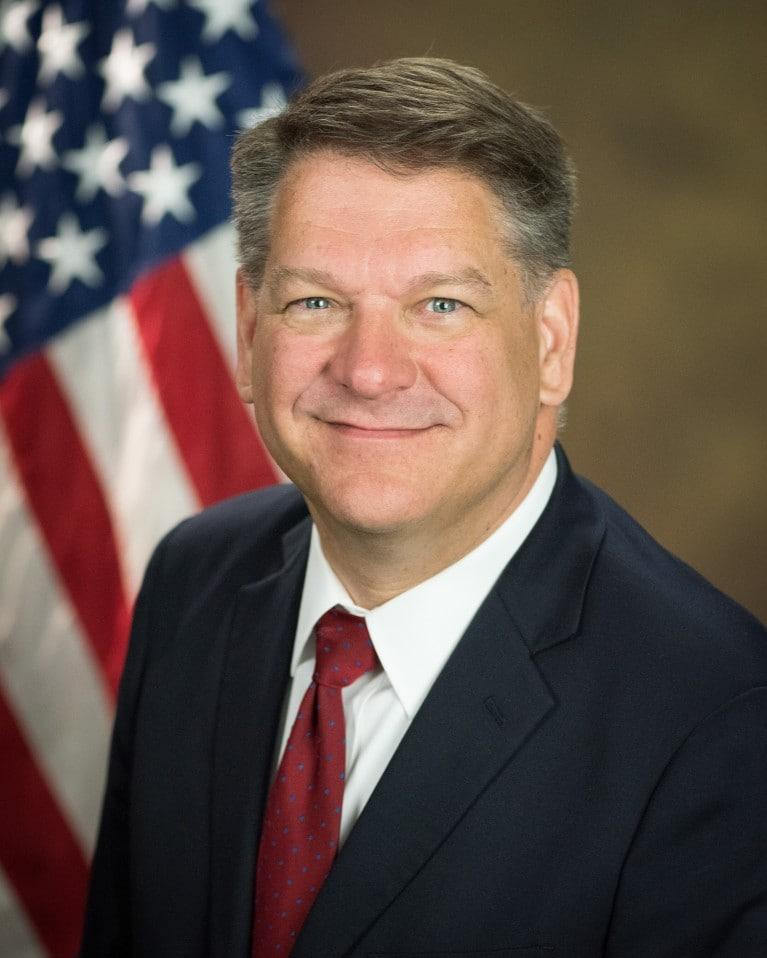

Acting Administrator of the Drug Enforcement Administration
- In office May 19, 2020 – January 20, 2021
- President: Donald Trump
- Deputy: Preston Grubbs
- Preceded by: Uttam Dhillon (Acting)
- Succeeded by: D. Christopher Evans (Acting)

Interim United States Attorney for the District of Columbia
- In office February 3, 2020 – May 19, 2020
- President: Donald Trump
- Preceded by: Jessie Liu
- Succeeded by: Michael R. Sherwin (Acting)

Personal details
- Born: Fall River, Massachusetts, U.S.
- Education: Boston College (BA); Georgetown University (JD)

Timothy Shea is an American attorney and prosecutor who served as acting Administrator of the Drug Enforcement Administration from 2020 to 2021. Previously, he was interim United States attorney for the District of Columbia, the country's largest U.S. attorney's office; a senior counselor to U.S. Attorney General William Barr at the Department of Justice; a lobbyist; and private corporate lawyer.

During his short tenure as U.S. attorney, Shea took the controversial step of calling for a dismissal of charges against Trump associate Michael Flynn, even though Flynn had already pleaded guilty. Shea also intervened in the criminal case against convicted Trump associate Roger Stone, recommending a lighter sentence for Stone than the career prosecutors who had worked on the case.

== Early life and education ==
Shea was born in Fall River, Massachusetts, into a family of five generations of firefighters. He studied political science and government at Boston College, graduating magna cum laude in 1982. He received his J.D. degree, graduating magna cum laude, from Georgetown University Law Center in 1991.

== Legal career ==
Shea has served in a variety of roles in the Justice Department. He was an assistant U.S. Attorney in Virginia between 1992 and 1997. Shea was chief of the Massachusetts Attorney General's Office's Public Protection Bureau from 1999 to 2001. He was chief counsel and staff director for the U.S. Senate Permanent Subcommittee on Investigations. He also worked on the staff of the House Appropriations Committee. Shea also worked as a lobbyist and private corporate lawyer. He worked at the law firms Morgan, Lewis & Bockius and Bingham McCutchen.

Shea was a "close confidant" to Attorney General William Barr and "Barr's right-hand man" at the Justice Department, according to Fox News. As a senior counselor, Shea advised Barr on changes at the Federal Bureau of Prisons after the death of the sex offender Jeffrey Epstein at the Metropolitan Correctional Center in New York City. Shea also worked on the Justice Department's Operation Relentless Pursuit. Barr has known Shea since 1991, when Shea was associate deputy attorney general for Barr in the George H.W. Bush administration.

== U.S. Attorney for the District of Columbia ==
Barr named Shea the interim U.S. Attorney for the District of Columbia on January 30, 2020. Shea replaced Jessie K. Liu, who had been U.S. Attorney since 2017. The office has 300 prosecutors.

Shea chose as his chief of staff David Metcalf, 34, who had been counsel to Barr's deputy attorney general, Jeffrey A. Rosen.

Some high-profile investigations that Shea oversaw are related to special counsel Robert Mueller's Russia investigation.

On May 18, 2020, Barr named Shea as the acting administrator of the Drug Enforcement Administration. Trump nominated Justin Herdman to be Shea's permanent successor as U.S. Attorney, and Michael R. Sherwin to lead the office on an interim basis.

=== Roger Stone sentencing ===
A reduced sentencing recommendation for Roger Stone, a political consultant and Trump advisor who was found guilty of witness tampering and lying to investigators in the Mueller investigation on Russian interference in the 2016 election, led to a national controversy in Shea's first weeks on the job. On February 11, 2020, Barr took the rare step of reducing a sentencing recommendation by four prosecutors in the U.S. Attorney's office that President Donald Trump had called “very horrible and unfair". Barr told ABC News that Shea had initially signaled to him that the recommendation would be about half the time that the line prosecutors requested. Shea's name was attached to both the initial recommendation of a seven- to nine-year prison term for Stone, and Barr's version a day later that called the first version "excessive". The four line prosecutors resigned from the case, and one resigned from the Justice Department entirely.

Assistant United States Attorney Aaron Zelinsky testified to the House Judiciary Committee that he "was explicitly told that the motivation for changing the sentencing memo was political, and because the U.S. Attorney [Shea] was 'afraid of the President.'"

=== Concord Management case ===
In March 2020, Shea's office dropped its two-year-long prosecution of two Russian shell companies, Concord Management and Concord Consulting, which had been charged with conspiring to defraud the United States by running a social media campaign to interfere in the 2016 presidential election. The Justice Department said the companies were exploiting the case to gain access to information about the investigation's sources and methods that Russia could weaponize. A Mueller-related case continues against 13 Russians including a part-owner of Concord, Yevgeny V. Prigozhin, an oligarch who is sometimes known as "Putin’s chef".

=== Michael Flynn case ===
Shea wrote the Justice Department's motion on May 7, 2020, to dismiss the charges against Michael Flynn, the former U.S. national security advisor to Donald Trump. Flynn had pled guilty to charges of lying to the Federal Bureau of Investigation about his conversations in 2016 with Russia's ambassador. Shea's motion said that the FBI agents’ questioning of Flynn "was untethered to, and unjustified by, the FBI’s counterintelligence investigation into Mr. Flynn." Shea alone signed the court document — an unusual departure, as court filings are usually signed by lower-level career prosecutors, not political appointees.

=== Criminal Division overhaul ===
Shortly before his departure, Shea reorganized the criminal division of the U.S. Attorney's office. Officials had discussed an overhaul of the unit for years, but some lawyers in the office were said to express concern because some prosecutors were moved out of the public corruption unit, which handles politically sensitive matters like the Roger Stone case.

== Drug Enforcement Administration ==
Attorney General Barr named Shea as the acting administrator of the Drug Enforcement Administration in May 2020.

In June 2020, Shea asked Barr to give the DEA temporary power “to enforce any federal crime committed as a result of the protests over the death of George Floyd," including the authority to conduct covert surveillance on protesters. More than 100 DEA agents assisted National Guard troops in Washington during the protests.
