= Bridget Brennan =

Bridget Brennan may refer to:

- Bridget M. Brennan (born 1974), American lawyer and judge
- Bridget Brennan (journalist), Australian journalist
