= Multinational Logistics Services scandal =

The Multinational Logistics Services (MLS) scandal was once compared to that of the Fat Leonard scandal but that comparison was later quietly walked back by the U.S. Department of Justice to a small isolated charge. U.S. federal agents initially claimed that MLS executive Frank Rafaraci participated in a $50 million fraud only for DOJ lawyers to later tell the court they had no evidence to support that charge and that the lead agent on the case, DCIS agent Cordell "Trey" DeLaPena, made "factually inaccurate" statements.

Malta-based MLS is one of the world's largest ship husbanding companies providing food and services to U.S. Naval vessels while in port. The company received commendations for its support of the U.S. fleet including during naval operations in Libya, Operation Desert Shield and Desert Storm, and Haiti disaster relief.

The "Fat Leonard" investigation, which DeLaPena also led, involved another port services company. A federal court found DeLaPena's "misconduct" in that case included false testimony and withholding of exculpatory evidence leading the judge to overturn the convictions of four former Navy officers.

Rafaraci pleaded guilty to one charge of bribery for giving a dock worker money. He told the court at sentencing that he had known the man for more than 20 years and gave him money to help pay for his son's tuition. Rafaraci's attorney, Michael R. Sherwin, submitted dozens of letters from Rafaraci's employees stating that he was known to give money to people in need. U.S. District Judge Dabney L. Friedrich acknowledged Rafaraci's actions may have been for a "noble cause" but said he still broke the law. He spent several months at a federal work camp.

In November 2024, Rafaraci sued DeLaPena in Malta alleging that the special agent falsely accused him of fraud and money laundering. DeLaPena did not appear to face the charges.

== Investigation ==
Defense Criminal Investigative Service (DCIS), Navy Criminal Investigative Service (NCIS), Internal Revenue Service Criminal Investigation (IRS-CI), and Army Criminal Investigative Division are investigating the case. Valuable assistance was provided by the Federal Bureau of Investigation (FBI), U.S. Department of State's Diplomatic Security Service, the Malta Police Force, Malta Office of the Attorney General, Essex Police, and U.K. International Crime Coordination Centre.
