= Channing E. Phillips =

American activist and minister

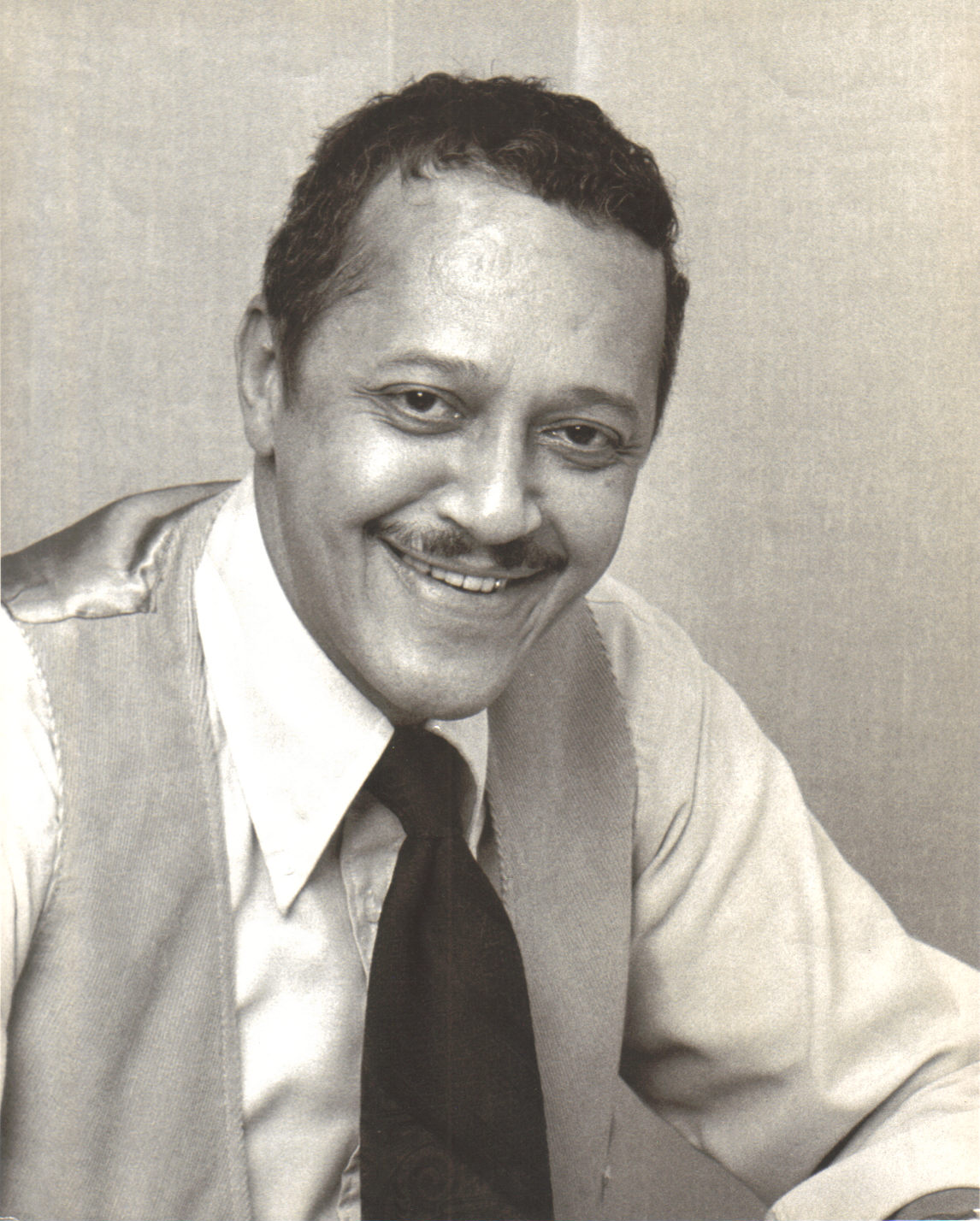

Personal details
- Born: Channing Emery Phillips; March 23, 1928 Brooklyn, New York, U.S.
- Died: October 11, 1987 (aged 59) New York City, New York, U.S.
- Party: Democratic
- Spouse: Jane Celeste
- Children: 5, including Channing

Channing Emery Phillips (March 23, 1928 – November 11, 1987) was an American minister, civil rights leader, and social activist based in Washington, D.C. In 1968, he was the first African American in history to be placed in nomination for president of the United States by a major political party.

== Early life ==
Phillips was born in Brooklyn. His father was a Baptist minister. He grew up in New York City and Pittsburgh. He served in the United States Army in the late-1940s. Phillips earned a bachelor's degree from Virginia Union University and a Master of Divinity from the Colgate Rochester Crozer Divinity School. He also did postgraduate work at Drew University.

== Career ==
Phillips moved to Washington, D.C., where he was a founding member of Coalition of Conscience. He also worked as a professor of divinity at Howard University. This conglomeration of local organizations worked to alleviate social problems in the capital. For seven years, Phillips served as the pastor of Lincoln Temple, United Church of Christ, in Washington.

In 1968, Phillips headed Robert F. Kennedy's presidential campaign in D.C. He led the delegation from the District of Columbia to the 1968 Democratic National Convention in Chicago. Members of the District's Delegation were originally pledged to Robert F. Kennedy. But, following Senator Kennedy's assassination in early June in California, the delegation voted instead to nominate Rev. Phillips as a favorite son.

He received 68 votes (behind Hubert Humphrey, Eugene McCarthy and George McGovern). By some accounts, Rev. Phillips was the first black person ever so nominated at a major party convention. He was the first African American to receive votes for the presidential nomination at a Democratic National Convention. Abolitionist Frederick Douglass received votes for president at the 1888 Republican National Convention, but it does not appear from the official record that his name was put into nomination.

Phillips said that his candidacy was meant to show that "the Negro vote must not be taken for granted." At the time of his candidacy, Phillips was president of the Housing Development Corporation, a government-backed housing venture in the federal capital.

In 1971 Phillips ran to become the first congressional delegate to the United States House of Representatives from D.C., but lost the Democratic primary to Walter E. Fauntroy. He was an advocate for full home-rule status for the District of Columbia.

Phillips later moved back to New York City in 1982. He became Minister of Planning and Coordination at the Riverside Church.

== Personal life ==
He died of cancer at the age of 59 and was survived by his wife, Jane, and their children, two sons: Channing D. Phillips, acting United States Attorney for the District of Columbia, and John E. Phillips of Manhattan, and three daughters: Sheilah P. Peterson and Tracy J. Phillips of Manhattan, and Jill C. Phillips of Oakland, California. The funeral was held at Riverside Church in New York.

== Sources ==
- Our Campaigns - Candidate - Channing E. Phillips
