= Charles Cleaves Cole =

American judge

Associate Justice of the Supreme Court of the District of Columbia
- In office January 28, 1893 – April 22, 1901
- Appointed by: Benjamin Harrison
- Preceded by: Charles Pinckney James
- Succeeded by: Thomas H. Anderson

United States Attorney for the District of Columbia
- In office 1891–1893
- President: Benjamin Harrison
- Preceded by: John B. Hoge
- Succeeded by: Arthur A. Birney

Personal details
- Born: Charles Cleaves Cole; May 22, 1841 Hiram, Maine, U.S.
- Died: March 17, 1905 (aged 63) Washington, D.C., U.S.
- Education: Harvard Law School (LL.B.) read law

Charles Cleaves Cole (May 22, 1841 – March 17, 1905) was an Associate Justice of the Supreme Court of the District of Columbia.

== Education and career ==
Born in Hiram, Maine, Cole read law to enter the bar in 1866, and received a Bachelor of Laws from Harvard Law School in 1867. He was a private in the United States Army during the American Civil War, serving in the 17th Maine Infantry, from 1862 to 1865. He was in private practice in Portland, Maine from 1866 to 1867, in West Union, West Virginia from 1868 to 1870, and in Parkersburg, West Virginia from 1870 to 1874. He was prosecuting attorney of Doddridge County, West Virginia from 1869 to 1870, and was city solicitor of Parkersburg from 1874 to 1876, thereafter resuming his private practice in Parkersburg until 1878, and in Washington, D.C. from 1878 to 1891. He was the United States Attorney for the District of Columbia from 1891 to 1893.

== Federal judicial service ==
Cole was nominated by President Benjamin Harrison on December 12, 1892, to an Associate Justice seat on the Supreme Court of the District of Columbia (now the United States District Court for the District of Columbia) vacated by Associate Justice Charles Pinckney James. He was confirmed by the United States Senate on January 28, 1893, and received his commission the same day. His service terminated on April 22, 1901, due to his resignation.

== Later career and death ==
Cole thereafter returned to private practice in Washington, D.C. from 1901 until his death there on March 17, 1905.

== Sources ==
Legal offices
Preceded by Charles Pinckney James	Associate Justice of the Supreme Court of the District of Columbia; 1893–1901	Succeeded by Thomas H. Anderson
