= Hiram, Maine =

Town in Maine, United States

- Town
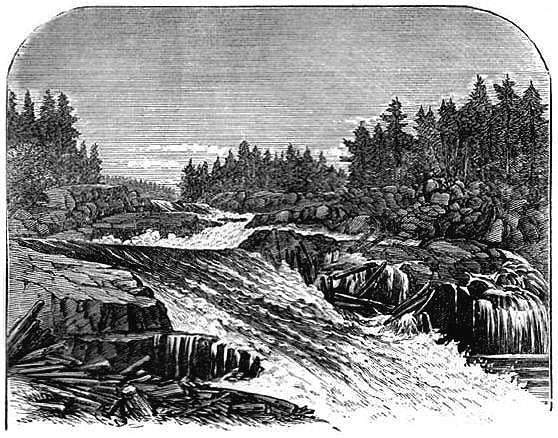
- Great Falls, Saco River in 1869

- Seal

- Location within Maine Location within the United States
- Coordinates: 43°52′28″N 70°50′12″W
- Country: United States
- State: Maine
- County: Oxford
- Incorporated: 1814

Area
  - Total: 38.87 sq mi (100.67 km^{2})
  - Land: 37.55 sq mi (97.25 km^{2})
  - Water: 1.32 sq mi (3.42 km^{2})
- Elevation: 663 ft (202 m)

Population (2020)
  - Total: 1,609
  - Density: 43/sq mi (16.5/km^{2})
- Time zone: UTC-5 (Eastern (EST))
  - Summer (DST): UTC-4 (EDT)
- ZIP code: 04041
- Area code: 207
- FIPS code: 23-33315
- GNIS feature ID: 582520
- Website: townofhiram.org

Hiram is a town in Oxford County, Maine, United States. The population was 1,609 at the 2020 census. It includes the villages of Hiram, East Hiram, South Hiram and Durgintown. Located among the rugged and unspoiled Western Maine Mountains, Hiram is part of the Portland-South Portland-Biddeford, Maine metropolitan New England city and town area.

== History ==
It became a stage stop along the Pequawket Trail, the former wilderness path of the Sokokis Abenakis which runs from Standish to Fryeburg (site of Pequawket, their stockaded village). First known as Great Ossipee after the Ossipee River, the town was settled in the 1780s and organized as Hiram Plantation, named after Hiram I, the biblical king of Tyre. Like King Hiram's domain, Hiram Plantation was set among forests. It was incorporated as a district on February 27, 1807, then as the town of Hiram on June 14, 1814. Peleg Wadsworth bought a tract of land here in 1790, and in 1792 or 1794 began clearing a farm for his eldest son.

Although uneven at the center, there was good and fertile farmland in the intervales. The soil was sandy loam, yielding wheat and hay, the principal crop. Sheep grazed the pastures, and their wool became an important product. In 1830, the town's population was 1,148.

The Saco River and ponds serving as reservoirs for tributary streams supplied water power for mills, and manufacturing timber became an important industry. In 1859, town industries included a number of cooper shops, two blacksmiths, several shoemaking shops and a harness making shop. By 1886, the town had five sawmills and planing mills, producing short and long lumber, barrel staves and shooks. It also had two gristmills and a carding mill. Other products included men's clothing, harness and slate blackboards. Described as "a pretty village amid charming scenery," Hiram was a junction where the Bridgton and Saco River Railroad met the Portland and Ogdensburg Railroad, which first opened service through the White Mountains on August 16, 1875.

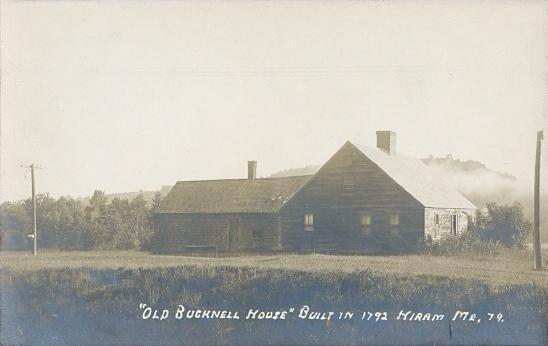
Bucknell House c. 1915, built in 1792 near the Saco

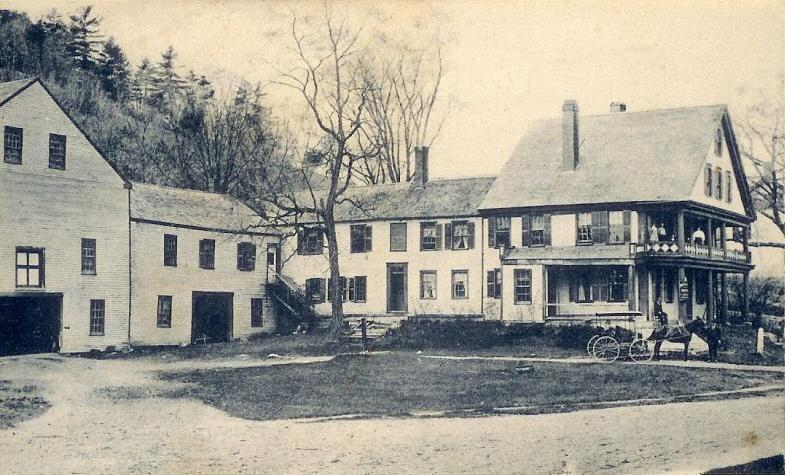
Mt. Cutler House in 1909, early stage stop and hotel

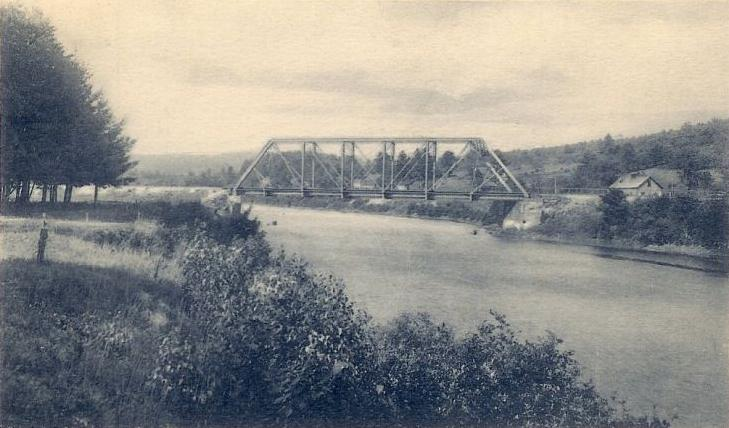
Railroad bridge across the Saco River in 1916

== Geography ==
According to the United States Census Bureau, the town has a total area of 38.87 square miles (100.67 km^{2}), of which 37.55 square miles (97.25 km^{2}) is land and 1.32 square miles (3.42 km^{2}) is water. Hiram is drained by the Ossipee River and Saco River.

The town is crossed by state routes 5, 113, 117, and 160. It is bordered by the towns of Brownfield and Denmark to the north, Porter to the west, Sebago and Baldwin to the east, and Cornish and Parsonsfield to the south.

=== Climate ===
This climatic region is typified by large seasonal temperature differences, with warm to hot (and often humid) summers and cold (sometimes severely cold) winters. According to the Köppen Climate Classification system, Hiram has a humid continental climate, abbreviated "Dfb" on climate maps.

== Demographics ==
Historical population
Census	Pop.	Note	%±
1790	92		—
1800	184		100.0%
1810	336		82.6%
1820	700		108.3%
1830	1,026		46.6%
1840	1,233		20.2%
1850	1,210		−1.9%
1860	1,283		6.0%
1870	1,393		8.6%
1880	1,452		4.2%
1890	1,063		−26.8%
1900	1,015		−4.5%
1910	945		−6.9%
1920	921		−2.5%
1930	813		−11.7%
1940	787		−3.2%
1950	804		2.2%
1960	699		−13.1%
1970	686		−1.9%
1980	1,067		55.5%
1990	1,260		18.1%
2000	1,423		12.9%
2010	1,620		13.8%
2020	1,609		−0.7%
U.S. Decennial Census

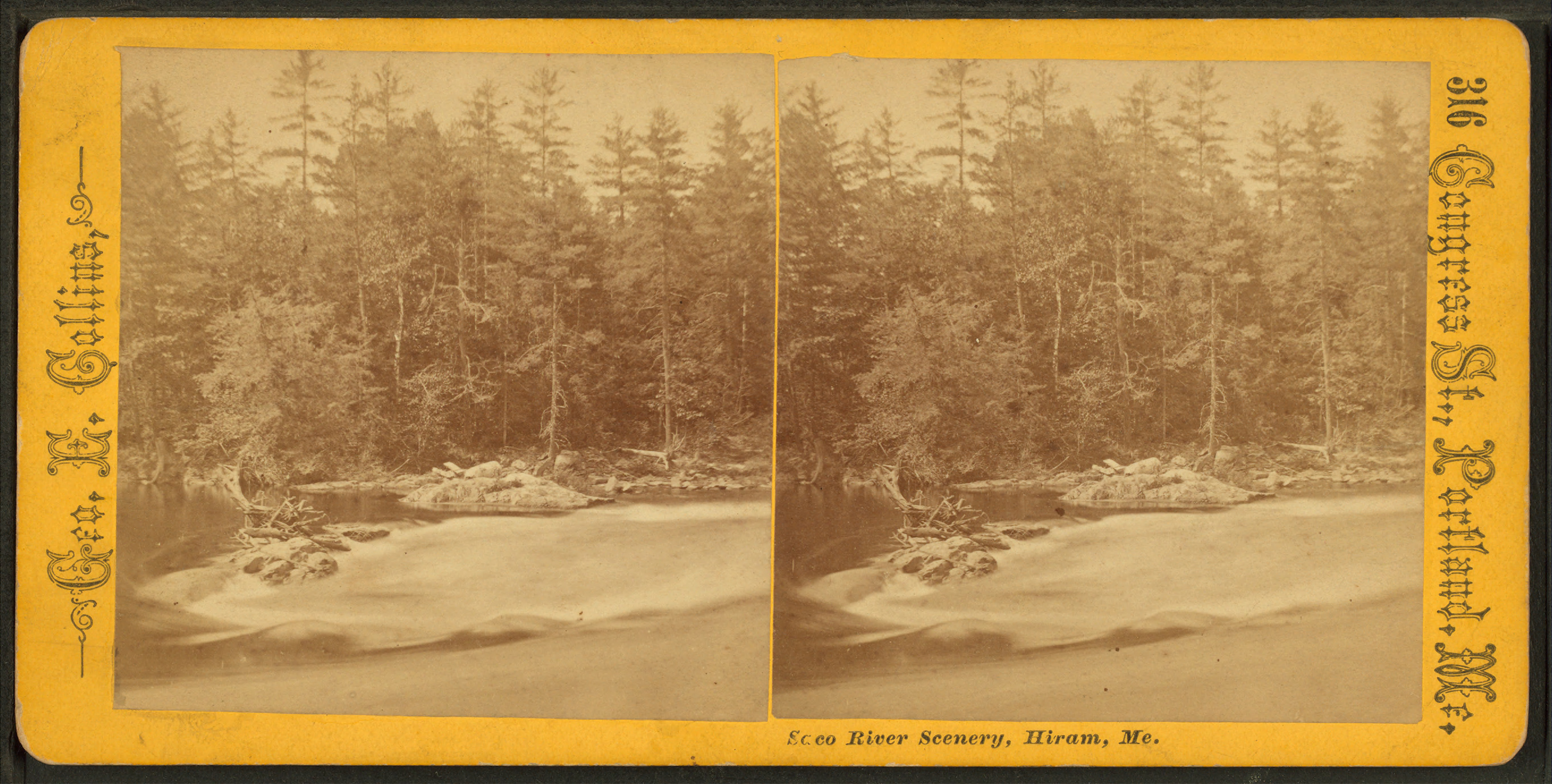
Saco River Scenery, Hiram, Me., a Victorian era stereographic card

=== 2010 census ===
As of the census of 2010, there were 1,620 people, 652 households, and 432 families living in the town. The population density was 43.1 inhabitants per square mile (16.6/km^{2}). There were 905 housing units at an average density of 24.1 per square mile (9.3/km^{2}). The racial makeup of the town was 95.7% White, 0.1% African American, 0.6% Native American, 0.4% Asian, 0.4% from other races, and 2.7% from two or more races. Hispanic or Latino of any race were 0.7% of the population.

There were 652 households, of which 31.4% had children under the age of 18 living with them, 50.6% were married couples living together, 11.0% had a female householder with no husband present, 4.6% had a male householder with no wife present, and 33.7% were non-families. 26.5% of all households were made up of individuals, and 8.9% had someone living alone who was 65 years of age or older. The average household size was 2.48 and the average family size was 3.00.

The median age in the town was 41.3 years. 25.1% of residents were under the age of 18; 7% were between the ages of 18 and 24; 23.2% were from 25 to 44; 30.9% were from 45 to 64; and 13.7% were 65 years of age or older. The gender makeup of the town was 51.4% male and 48.6% female.

=== 2000 census ===
As of the census of 2000, there were 1,423 people, 534 households, and 388 families living in the town. The population density was 37.9 inhabitants per square mile (14.6/km^{2}). There were 769 housing units at an average density of 20.5 per square mile (7.9/km^{2}). The racial makeup of the town was 97.61% White, 0.07% African American, 0.49% Native American, 0.28% Asian, 0.07% from other races, and 1.48% from two or more races. Hispanic or Latino of any race were 0.42% of the population.

There were 534 households, out of which 36.3% had children under the age of 18 living with them, 60.1% were married couples living together, 8.6% had a female householder with no husband present, and 27.3% were non-families. 19.5% of all households were made up of individuals, and 7.3% had someone living alone who was 65 years of age or older. The average household size was 2.66 and the average family size was 3.07.

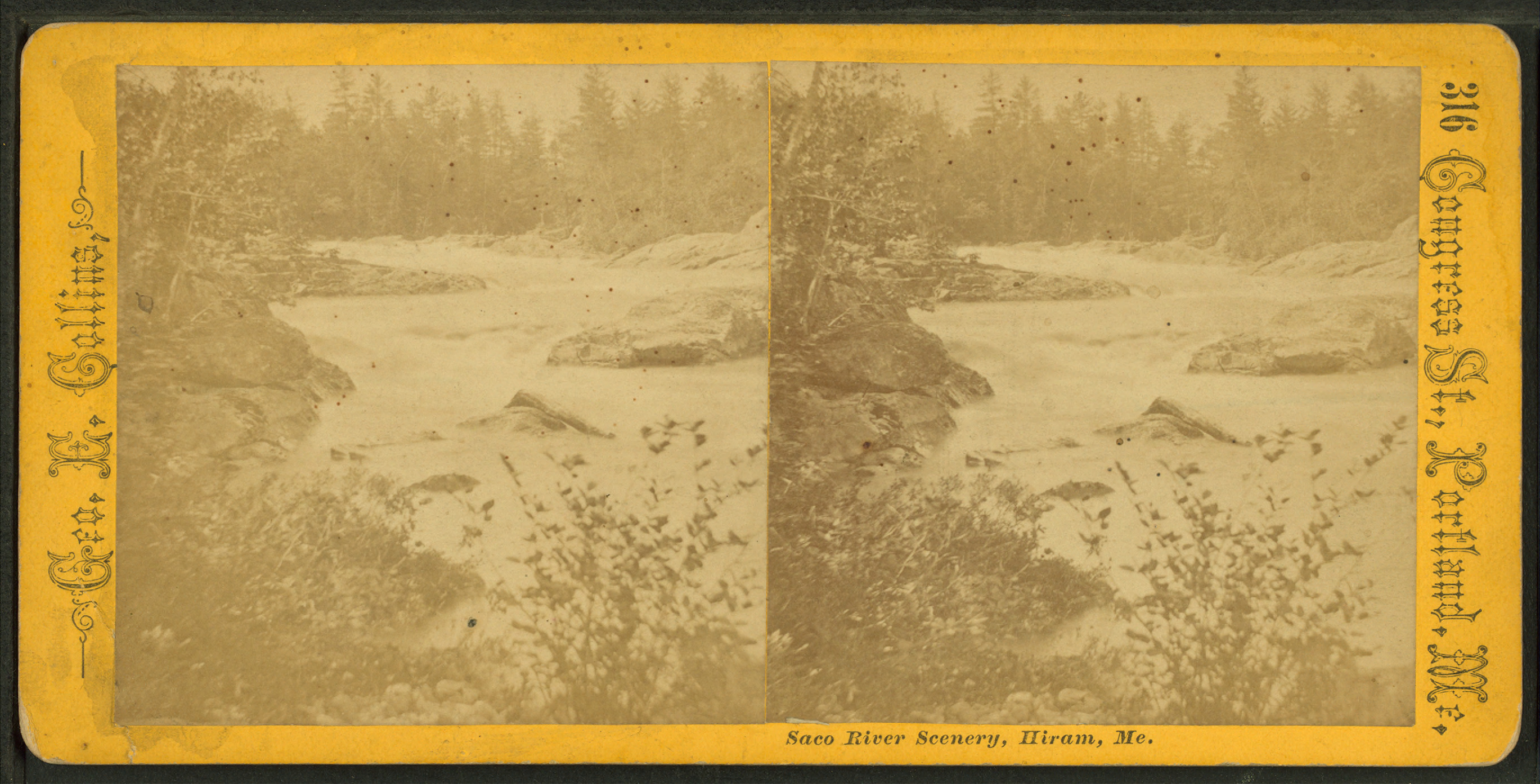
Saco River Scenery, Hiram, Me.

In the town, the population was spread out, with 27.8% under the age of 18, 6.4% from 18 to 24, 29.4% from 25 to 44, 25.7% from 45 to 64, and 10.8% who were 65 years of age or older. The median age was 37 years. For every 100 females, there were 99.3 males. For every 100 females age 18 and over, there were 99.8 males.

The median income for a household in the town was $34,167, and the median income for a family was $36,964. Males had a median income of $27,784 versus $22,500 for females. The per capita income for the town was $16,293. About 12.0% of families and 14.0% of the population were below the poverty line, including 18.8% of those under age 18 and 3.9% of those age 65 or over.

== Local schools ==
- Sacopee Valley Middle School
- Sacopee Valley High School

== Notable people ==
- Contessa Brewer, MSNBC anchorwoman
- Charles Cleaves Cole, federal judge
- Henry Wadsworth Longfellow, poet
- Peleg Wadsworth, general, founded Hiram
