= Revised Statutes of the United States =

First official codification of the Acts of Congress

The Revised Statutes of the United States (in citations, Rev. Stat.) was the first official codification of the Acts of Congress. It was enacted into law in 1874. The purpose of the Revised Statutes was to make it easier to research federal law without needing to consult the individual Acts of Congress published in the United States Statutes at Large.

After problems were quickly identified in the first edition, a second edition of the Revised Statutes was issued in 1878 that remedied some of those problems. However, for the next 50 years, subsequent Acts of Congress were not regularly incorporated into the Revised Statutes, once again requiring researchers to use the Statutes at Large or unofficial codes. This eventually led to the creation of the United States Code in 1926, which is now regularly maintained and updated.

== Background ==
For nearly nine decades after the United States Constitution was ratified, those needing to research federal law had no official codification upon which to authoritatively rely. Instead, the only way to accurately know the law was to consult the individual acts of Congress, which had been compiled and published since 1845 as session laws in the United States Statutes at Large. Previous codifications by private publishers were useful shortcuts for research purposes, but had no official status.

Senator Charles Sumner of Massachusetts began to press Congress to revise and consolidate national statutes in 1851. Ten years later, President Abraham Lincoln recommended such revision in his annual message of December 3, 1861. It was not until 1866 and the administration of President Andrew Johnson that the Congress finally approved Sumner's An Act to provide for the Revision and Consolidation of the Statute Laws of the United States.

The Act called for three commissioners to carry out this work for three years, and President Johnson appointed Caleb Cushing, Charles Pinckney James, and William Johnston as these commissioners. Cushing, James, and Johnston were unable to complete their task within the allotted time. Congress continued the work by passing a continuation of the original act in 1870. President Ulysses S. Grant renewed the appointment of Charles Pinckney James but called on Benjamin Vaughan Abbott and Victor C. Barringer to replace Cushing and Johnston.

However, a House committee decided that in the process of codification, the commission had changed the original statutes too much. Congress then authorized a joint committee to appoint someone to finish the project, and Washington D.C. lawyer Thomas Jefferson Durant then finalized a revision that undid the substantive changes made by the commission.

== First edition ==
Congress approved Durant's revision and enacted it into positive law on June 22, 1874 as the Revised Statutes of the United States, covering all laws in effect as of December 1, 1873. This version was published in two volumes in 1875, and is available online.

By a separate Act of June 20, 1874, Congress required the Secretary of State to publish it, and once published in 1875, it became "legal evidence" of the laws of the United States.

== Second edition ==
Various problems soon emerged with the first edition, including substantive errors. On March 2, 1877, the Congress called for an updated and expanded edition of the Revised Statutes. Charles Pinckney James was again called to service to support George S. Boutwell, who was named commissioner for this work.

The second edition was just one volume. Unlike the first edition, Congress did not enact the second edition into positive law. Instead, the second edition was specified to be prima facie evidence of the law that could be rebutted by referring to the original legal text of session laws in Statutes at Large.

== Subsequent developments ==
Following the second edition, subsequent new enactments by Congress were not incorporated into the official code. Thus, over time, researchers once again had to delve through many volumes of the United States Statutes at Large or use unofficial, privately published supplements.

According to the preface to the United States Code, "From 1897 to 1907 a commission was engaged in an effort to codify the great mass of accumulating legislation. The work of the commission involved an expenditure of over $300,000, but was never carried to completion." During the 1920s, some members of Congress revived the codification project, resulting in the approval of the Code by Congress in 1926.
