= Channing D. Phillips =

American lawyer (born 1958)

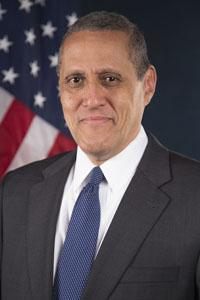

United States Attorney for the District of Columbia
- Acting
- In office March 3, 2021 – November 5, 2021
- President: Joe Biden
- Preceded by: Michael R. Sherwin
- Succeeded by: Matthew M. Graves
- In office October 19, 2015 – September 24, 2017
- President: Barack Obama; Donald Trump
- Preceded by: Vincent H. Cohen Jr.
- Succeeded by: Jessie Liu
- Acting
- In office May 28, 2009 – February 2010
- President: Barack Obama
- Preceded by: Jeffrey A. Taylor (acting)
- Succeeded by: Ronald Machen

United States Attorney General
- Acting
- In office January 30, 2017
- President: Donald Trump
- Deputy: Vacant
- Preceded by: Sally Yates (acting)
- Succeeded by: Dana Boente (acting)

Personal details
- Born: Channing Durward Phillips; March 9, 1958 (age 68) Washington, D.C., U.S.
- Party: Democratic Party
- Education: University of Virginia (BA); Howard University (JD)

Channing Durward Phillips (born March 9, 1958) is an American attorney who served as acting United States attorney for the District of Columbia from March to November 2021. He previously served in the position in a permanent capacity from October 2015 to September 2017 and in an acting capacity from May 2009 to February 2010. He also served as acting United States Attorney General in his capacity as United States Attorney for the District of Columbia for a few hours following the dismissal of Sally Yates on January 30, 2017 pursuant to Executive Order 13762 titled “Providing an Order of Succession Within the Department of Justice” that was signed by President Barack Obama on January 13, 2017 and published in the Federal Register on January 19, 2017. President Donald Trump signed an executive order naming United States Attorney for the Eastern District of Virginia Dana Boente as acting United States Attorney General a few hours after the dismissal of Sally Yates and automatic succession of Phillips to the position of acting United States Attorney General.

== Early life and education ==
Born and raised in Washington, D.C., Phillips earned a Bachelor of Arts degree from the University of Virginia in 1980 and a Juris Doctor from the Howard University School of Law in 1986.

== Career ==
In 1990, Phillips became a trial attorney at the United States Department of Justice Criminal Division in the Organized Crime & Racketeering Section. In 1994, he moved to the United States Attorney's Office in D.C. In 2010, he returned to the Justice Department to serve in the Office of the Attorney General.

In 2015, after Ronald Machen's resignation as U.S. Attorney, Delegate Eleanor Holmes Norton recommended Phillips for the position. Phillips was nominated by President Obama to be the next U.S. Attorney on October 8, 2015, and designated acting U.S. Attorney on October 19, 2015. In December 2015, Phillips announced the closure of a long-running and controversial investigation into former Mayor Vincent C. Gray, who was not charged.

During the 2017 dismissal of U.S. attorneys, Phillips was not asked to resign because he had not yet been confirmed and remained acting U.S. Attorney. On June 12, 2017, Donald Trump nominated Jessie Liu to serve as U.S. attorney. She became his successor after the United States Senate confirmed her nomination in September 2017.

On March 3, 2021, Phillips once again became acting U.S. attorney after being appointed by President Joe Biden. His service terminated once his successor, Matthew M. Graves was sworn in.

== Personal life ==
Phillips is the son of Channing E. Phillips, a minister and civil rights activist who became the first African-American to have his name placed in nomination for President of the United States by a major political party in 1968.

Legal offices
Preceded by Jeffrey A. Taylor; Acting	United States Attorney for the District of Columbia; Acting; 2009–2010	Succeeded by Ronald Machen
Preceded by Vincent H. Cohen Jr.	United States Attorney for the District of Columbia; 2015–2017	Succeeded by Jessie Liu
Preceded by Sally Yates; Acting	United States Attorney General; Acting; 2017	Succeeded by Dana Boente; Acting
Preceded by Michael R. Sherwin	United States Attorney for the District of Columbia; Acting; 2021	Succeeded by Matthew M. Graves
