= Jessie Liu =

American lawyer (born 1973)

- 劉潔西
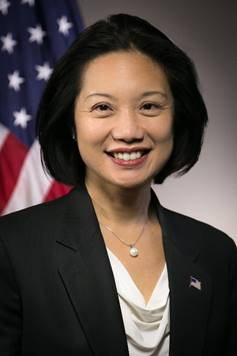

54th United States Attorney for the District of Columbia
- In office September 24, 2017 – January 31, 2020
- President: Donald Trump
- Preceded by: Channing D. Phillips
- Succeeded by: Timothy Shea

Personal details
- Born: Jessie Kong Liu; January 2, 1973 (age 53) Kingsville, Texas, U.S.
- Spouse: Michael Abramowicz (m. 1999)
- Education: Harvard University (BA); Yale University (JD)

Chinese name
- Traditional Chinese: 劉潔西
- Simplified Chinese: 刘洁西
Transcriptions
Standard Mandarin
- Hanyu Pinyin: Liú Jiéxī
- Bopomofo: ㄌㄧㄡˊㄐㄧㄝˊㄒㄧ
- Wade–Giles: Liu2 Chieh2-hsi1

Jessie Kong Liu (Chinese: 劉潔西; born January 2, 1973) is an American lawyer and jurist who served as the United States attorney for the District of Columbia from 2017 to 2020. She previously worked as deputy general counsel at the U.S. Treasury and served at the Justice Department. In 2020, she joined the law firm Skadden, Arps, Slate, Meagher & Flom as a partner.

== Early life and education ==
Liu was born in Kingsville, Texas, to a Taiwanese American immigrant family. She graduated from Harvard University with a Bachelor of Arts (B.A.) in literature, summa cum laude, in 1995 and then earned her Juris Doctor (J.D.) from Yale Law School in 1998. She clerked for Judge Carolyn Dineen King of the United States Court of Appeals for the Fifth Circuit from 1998 to 1999.

== Career ==
Liu worked as an associate at Jenner & Block from 1999 to 2002, as a partner at the same firm from 2009 to 2016, and as a partner at Morrison & Foerster from 2016 to 2017.

Liu served as assistant United States attorney in the District of Columbia from 2002 to 2006. She worked at the United States Department of Justice during the administration of President George W. Bush from 2006 to 2009. Her roles included deputy chief of staff in the National Security Division, counsel to the deputy attorney general, and deputy assistant attorney general in the Civil Rights Division.

Liu worked for the 2016 transition team of President-elect Donald Trump, and in 2017 became deputy general counsel at the United States Department of the Treasury. In June 2017, President Donald Trump nominated Liu to become the next United States attorney for the District of Columbia. Liu was confirmed by the Senate by voice vote in September 2017.

While serving as the U.S. attorney for the District of Columbia, Liu received criticism from residents and local lawmakers for her record of not prosecuting hate crimes. An investigation by The Washington Post found that under her leadership, hate crime prosecutions and convictions in D.C. were at their lowest point in at least a decade. After much public pressure, her office made more prosecutions for hate crimes in 2019 than it did in all of 2018 and 2017 combined.

In March 2019, President Donald Trump said he would nominate Liu to become United States associate attorney general, but she withdrew her name from consideration later that month because the Republican-controlled Senate Judiciary Committee objected to her nomination.

On December 10, 2019, President Trump announced his intent to nominate Liu as Under Secretary for Terrorism and Financial Crimes at the Department of the Treasury. The nomination was submitted to the U.S. Senate on January 6, 2020. Some Republicans doubted her conservative credentials and loyalty to Trump. As a US attorney, Liu had overseen some ancillary cases referred by the Mueller investigation including the prosecution of longtime Trump associate Roger Stone, as well as a politically charged case involving former FBI deputy director Andrew McCabe, a frequent target of Trump's ire. In January 2020 she determined there was insufficient evidence to indict McCabe. She was then transferred to the Treasury Department to await her confirmation, as Barr replaced her with his close advisor Timothy Shea. On February 11, 2020, Trump withdrew her nomination, two days before her confirmation hearing was scheduled to begin. CNN reported that Liu's nomination was withdrawn because she was perceived to be insufficiently involved in the Stone and McCabe cases. Liu resigned from the government on February 12, 2020. Days later it was reported that before Liu's nomination was withdrawn, Trump was presented with a lengthy memo describing a variety of ways Liu was perceived to be disloyal, primarily by not prosecuting individuals Trump disliked.

In November 2026, Judge Ana C. Reyes appointed Liu as special master to investigate possible ethical violations by Justice Department and Interior Department lawyers in a lawsuit over President Trump's plans for the East Potomac Park Golf Course.

== Awards and honors ==
Liu has received numerous awards. She was named a White Collar Trailblazer by the National Law Journal in 2015, was named among the Best Lawyers Under 40 by the National Asian Pacific American Bar Association in 2011, received a Rising Star Award from the Asian Pacific American Bar Association of Washington, D.C., in 2011, and received a Service Award from the National Association of Women Lawyers in 2005.

== Personal life ==
She is married to Michael Abramowicz, a lawyer who also attended Yale Law School.

== See also ==
- Michael Flynn
- Rick Gates (political consultant)
- Timeline of investigations into Trump and Russia (2019–2020)
