= Charles Pinckney James =

American judge

Associate Justice of the Supreme Court of the District of Columbia
- In office July 24, 1879 – December 1, 1892
- Appointed by: Rutherford B. Hayes
- Preceded by: David Campbell Humphreys
- Succeeded by: Charles Cleaves Cole

Personal details
- Born: Charles Pinckney James; May 11, 1818 Cincinnati, Ohio, U.S.
- Died: August 9, 1899 (aged 81) Leesburg, Virginia, U.S.
- Education: Harvard University

Charles Pinckney James (May 11, 1818 – August 9, 1899) was an associate justice of the Supreme Court of the District of Columbia.

== Education and career ==
Born in Cincinnati, Ohio, James graduated from Harvard University in 1838. He was in private practice in Cincinnati from 1840 to 1850, and was a professor of law at Cincinnati College (now the University of Cincinnati) from 1850 to 1856. He was Judge of the Superior Court of Cincinnati from 1856 to 1864. He was in private practice in Washington, D.C. from 1864 to 1879, also working as a professor of law at Georgetown University from 1870 to 1874.

== Contribution to the Revised Statutes ==
James substantially contributed to the Revised Statutes of the United States during the 1870s. He was appointed by President Andrew Johnson in 1866 and re-appointed by President Ulysses S. Grant in 1870 as one of three commissioners tasked to revise and consolidate existing federal statutes. The first edition of the Revised Statutes was adopted by Congress in 1874. In 1877, commissioner George S. Boutwell prepared the second edition of the Revised Statutes with the assistance of James. James appears to have been the only person to have worked on both the first and second editions of the Revised Statutes.

== Federal judicial service ==
James received a recess appointment from President Rutherford B. Hayes on July 24, 1879, to an associate justice seat on the Supreme Court of the District of Columbia (now the United States District Court for the District of Columbia) vacated by Associate Justice David Campbell Humphreys. He was nominated to the same position by President Hayes on December 1, 1879. He was confirmed by the United States Senate on December 10, 1879, and received his commission the same day. His service terminated on December 1, 1892, due to his retirement.

== Death ==
James died on August 9, 1899, in Leesburg, Virginia.

== Publications ==
- James, Charles Pinckney. Address delivered at Camp McRae: before the Citizens' Guards of Cincinnati, on their fourth anniversary, July 4th, 1842. Cincinnati: R. P. Brooks, 1842.
- James, Charles Pinckney, and C. A. L. Richards. Oration and Poem, delivered before the Cincinnati Literary Club, July 4th, 1853. Cincinnati: Truman & Spofford, 1853. (oration by James; poem by Richards)
- James, Charles Pinckney. Address to the class of 1872 Law Department of the University of Georgetown, June 4, 1872. Washington [D.C.]: Cunningham & McIntosh, 1872.
- James, Charles Pinckney. Oration delivered before the Philodemic Society of Georgetown College, June 24, 1874. Washington [D.C.]: Joseph L. Pearson, 1874.
- James, Charles Pinckney. The power of Congress to punish contempts and breaches of privilege. Washington [D.C.]: W. H. & O. H. Morrison, 1879.

== Sources ==
Legal offices
Preceded by William Johnston	Judge of the Cincinnati Superior Court; 1856–1864	Succeeded by George Hoadly
Preceded by David Campbell Humphreys	Associate Justice of the Supreme Court of the District of Columbia; 1879–1892	Succeeded by Charles Cleaves Cole
