= Dan Polster =

American judge (born 1951)

Dan A. Polster
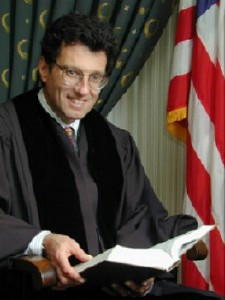
- Judge Polster c. 2000

Senior Judge of the United States District Court for the Northern District of Ohio
- Incumbent
- Assumed office January 31, 2021

Judge of the United States District Court for the Northern District of Ohio
- In office August 3, 1998 – January 31, 2021
- Appointed by: Bill Clinton
- Preceded by: David Dudley Dowd Jr.
- Succeeded by: Bridget M. Brennan

Personal details
- Born: 1951 (age 74–75) Cleveland, Ohio, U.S.
- Education: Harvard University (BA, JD)

Dan Aaron Polster (born 1951) is a senior United States district judge of the United States District Court for the Northern District of Ohio. Polster mediated a settlement between the city of Cleveland and the family of Tamir Rice, a 12-year-old black boy who was killed by a white police officer in 2014. In December 2017, a federal judicial panel selected Polster to preside over more than 3,000 consolidated prescription opioid-related lawsuits in multidistrict litigation known as the National Prescription Opiate Litigation. A trial for the litigation began in October 2021.

== Education and career ==
Born in Cleveland, Polster received a Bachelor of Arts from Harvard College in 1972 and earned a Juris Doctor from Harvard Law School in 1976. He was a trial attorney in the Antitrust Division of the United States Department of Justice from 1976 to 1982, and an assistant United States attorney in the Northern District of Ohio from 1982 to 1998.

=== Federal judicial service ===
On July 31, 1997, Polster was nominated by President Bill Clinton to a seat on the United States District Court for the Northern District of Ohio vacated by David Dudley Dowd Jr. Polster was confirmed by the United States Senate on July 31, 1998, and received his commission on August 3, 1998. He assumed senior status on January 31, 2021.

=== Notable rulings and commentary ===
Polster helped to mediate a lawsuit over limits on protests at the 2016 Republican National Convention.

Polster mediated a settlement between the city of Cleveland and the family of Tamir Rice, a 12-year-old black boy who was killed by a white police officer in 2014. Rice's mother said "It's disturbing that I had to put a price on my son, that I was forced to make a decision I didn't want to make." She said she is angry and frustrated that no one has been held accountable for her son's death. The settlement meant that there would not be answers to some of the questions raised in the civil lawsuit, including whether dispatchers passed along sufficient information to the police and whether the department erred in hiring the officer who killed Rice. Some experts have questioned whether the settlement will lead to adequate reforms of the police department.

In February 2017, Polster said that comments made by Donald Trump criticizing federal judges called the president's legitimacy into question.

Polster mediated settlements in 700 cases involving medical contract dye. Of mediation, Polster has said "Sometimes I feel like I am a therapist, or a rabbi or a priest. I had to train myself to lean in to the emotions. For lawyers, it is just the facts–forget the feelings and emotions." He has said "I can do things, as a judge, that no one else can, because I am the judge. I also use my courtroom in the mediation. Mediation is qualitatively different if the party is sitting in the very courtroom, the very seat, he or she will be in if the case is tried in front of the jury box. I use that!"

Polster rejected arguments from Ohio Secretary of State Frank LaRose to limit the use of ballot drop boxes in the 2020 election. LaRose immediately appealed the decision. The U.S. Court of Appeals for the 6th Circuit granted an injunction against Polster's ruling, leaving the ultimate decision to be made after election day. The appeals court ruled that "Ohio's restrictions are reasonable and non-discriminatory" and that the state "offers many ways to vote." The plaintiffs dropped the case on October 22, facing the possibility of $40,000 in court costs.

=== Multidistrict opioid litigation ===
In December 2017, a federal judicial panel selected Polster to preside over more than 3,000 consolidated prescription opioid-related lawsuits in multidistrict litigation known as the National Prescription Opiate Litigation. The multidistrict litigation is a master case designed to simultaneously resolve all opioid lawsuits against drug companies and pharmacies. The defendants include makers of prescription painkillers, companies that distribute them, and pharmacies that dispense them. Legal experts have described the opioid litigation as the largest and most complex civil lawsuit in U.S. history.

During the case's first hearing in January 2018, Polster told lawyers that he planned to dispense with legal norms like discovery and ordered lawyers to immediately prepare for settlement discussions. The New York Times reported that many lawyers on both sides "were scathing, questioning his grasp of the issues and predicting that a stepped-up timetable was bound to collapse." In September 2019, attorneys for eight drug distributors sought to disqualify Polster from the case, saying his public comments about his intention to get plaintiffs help showed evidence of bias. Attorneys cited Polster's January 2018 remark that "My objective is to do something meaningful to abate the [opioid] crisis and to do it in 2018." Polster declined to step aside.

In April 2019, Polster barred the media from court proceedings in the opioid lawsuit. The Reporters Committee for Freedom of the Press criticized this move, saying "the public is presumed to have the right of access to proceedings in civil cases." Polster issued a gag order limiting the ability of attorneys to speak publicly about the litigation. An investigation by Reuters "showed that Polster has been more willing to seal documents than other judges involved in opioid litigation, raising concerns that important information about the crisis remains secret."

In June 2019, a three-judge panel of the Sixth U.S. Circuit Court of Appeals ruled that Polster's blocking of the release of court records in opioid cases was inappropriate.

In April 2020, the U.S. Court of Appeals for the Sixth Circuit issued a sharp rebuke of Polster, writing that his pretrial ruling allowing plaintiffs to add new claims more than a year after the deadline was a "clear abuse of discretion." Judge Raymond Kethledge wrote that multidistrict litigation is "not some kind of judicial border country, where the rules are few and the law rarely makes an appearance."

In September 2020, the U.S. Court of Appeals for the Sixth Circuit reversed Polster's 2019 approval of the nation's first "negotiation class." Judge Eric L. Clay wrote that "the district court simply is not authorized by the structure, framework, or language of Rule 23," referring to Federal Rule 23 of Civil Procedure, which governs class action lawsuits.

Polster has a history of encouraging parties to settle their cases outside of court. He has been clear about his preference for a settlement rather than a trial in the opioid litigation, saying at an initial hearing that "we don't need a lot of briefs and we don't need trials." Polster warned pharmaceutical companies that they would face bankruptcy if they did not settle. Legal Newsline wrote that in doing so, Polster "demonstrated why plaintiff lawyers love the strategy so much: Because it is extremely effective at extracting settlements from the companies they sue."

The multidistrict opioid litigation is thought to have wide-reaching legal implications. Writing for National Review, Jack Fowler said "Somewhat off America's radar screen is a legal case, of the huge-implications variety, that is not only vast and complex but also a nose-thumbing to those (naïvely?) believing that social policy should be set by the people's legislative representatives, and not by judges." In The Wall Street Journal, Yale law professor Abbe Gluck wrote, "What began as a single opioid lawsuit in Ohio is now the only such case that matters. Every significant opioid lawsuit in the U.S. has been lumped together into a giant case before one federal judge in Cleveland who has declared his extraordinary ambition to 'solve' the crisis in 2018." Gluck asked, "Is a federal courtroom, presided over by a single judge, a better forum for making policy than 50 state legislatures or Congress?"

The trial, which was originally scheduled for October 2020, was delayed due to COVID-19. A number of companies settled prior to trial, while other companies, including Walmart and Walgreens, elected to go to trial. Polster initially said he would automatically disqualify any potential jurors who were not vaccinated against COVID-19. He later reversed this order.

The trial began in October 2021. In the trial, lawyers for the plaintiffs claimed the pharmacies "dispensed like a vending machine" and failed to identify signs of drug misuse. A lawyer for one of the defendant companies said that others, including doctors, were instead to blame for the rise in prescriptions.

Three weeks into the six week trial, a juror committed grave misconduct by giving fellow jurors a printout from her home computer that cast doubt on testimony by a witness from Walgreens. All four defendants in the trial—Walgreens, Walmart, Giant Eagle Inc., and CVS—sought a mistrial due to the juror's misconduct. The Ohio counties' lead trial lawyer initially said it would be appropriate to declare a mistrial, but later changed his mind. Polster denied the mistrial motions.

On November 23, 2021, the jury found CVS, Walgreens, and Walmart liable for creating a public nuisance by contributing to the U.S. opioid crisis. The jury only decided liability, and now Polster will decide how much the companies will have to pay in damages. The companies have announced plans to appeal the verdict, saying that pharmacists only dispensed prescriptions written by licensed health care providers. Some experts expect the verdict to be set aside due to juror misconduct, and for an appeals court to order a retrial. Similar public nuisance arguments in other opioid lawsuits have been rejected in California and Oklahoma. The editorial board of The Wall Street Journal critiqued the Ohio verdict, writing "The jury verdict distorts product liability and public-nuisance law since opioids are legal products and pharmacies had no control over how they were used by customers. If the verdict stands, or the companies settle, the precedent could lead to similar nuisance suits across much of the U.S. economy."

In August 2022, Polster ruled that CVS, Walgreens, and Walmart pharmacies must pay $650.5 million in damages to Lake County and Trumbull County in Ohio for contributing to the opioid epidemic in those areas.

== See also ==
- List of Jewish American jurists

Legal offices
Preceded by David Dudley Dowd Jr.	Judge of the United States District Court for the Northern District of Ohio; 1998–2021	Succeeded by Bridget M. Brennan
