= George B. Corkhill =

American lawyer

George Corkhill

United States Attorney for the District of Columbia
- In office 1880–1884
- Nominated by: Rutherford B. Hayes
- Preceded by: Henry H. Wells
- Succeeded by: Augustus S. Worthington

Personal details
- Born: George Baker Corkhill; 1838 Harrison County, Ohio, U.S.
- Died: July 6, 1886 (aged 47–48) Mount Pleasant, Iowa, U.S.
- Education: Iowa Wesleyan University (BA); Harvard Law School

Military service
- Battles/wars: American Civil War

George Baker Corkhill (1838–1886) was an American lawyer who served as United States Attorney for the District of Columbia and prosecuted Charles J. Guiteau for the assassination of James A. Garfield.

== Early life and education ==
Corkhill was born in Harrison County, Ohio, and moved to Iowa with his family at age nine. In 1859, he graduated from Iowa Wesleyan University in Mount Pleasant, Iowa. He studied law at Harvard Law School but left to join the Union Army at the start of American Civil War. He served throughout the war, attaining the rank of lieutenant colonel.

== Career ==
After the war he worked for U.S. Senator and Secretary of the Interior James Harlan in Washington, D.C., and practiced law in Iowa. In 1872, he returned to Washington and became the editor and part-owner of a newspaper, The Washington Daily Chronicle, until it went out of business. In January 1880, he became United States Attorney for the District of Columbia and served on the prosecution team during the Guiteau trial, which began in November 1881 and ended with Guiteau's conviction in January 1882. He also prosecuted postal officials involved in the Star Route scandal.

== Personal life ==
Corkhill's first marriage was to Olive B. Miller, the eldest daughter of Supreme Court Justice Samuel Freeman Miller. His second marriage was to a daughter of Hiram Walbridge, a U.S. Representative from New York. During his time in Washington, he lived at Ingleside.

=== Death ===
He died in Mount Pleasant, Iowa, on July 6, 1886, from a disability caused by a war injury.
