= Humphreys–Rodgers House =

Historic house in Alabama, United States

- David C. Humphreys House
- U.S. National Register of Historic Places
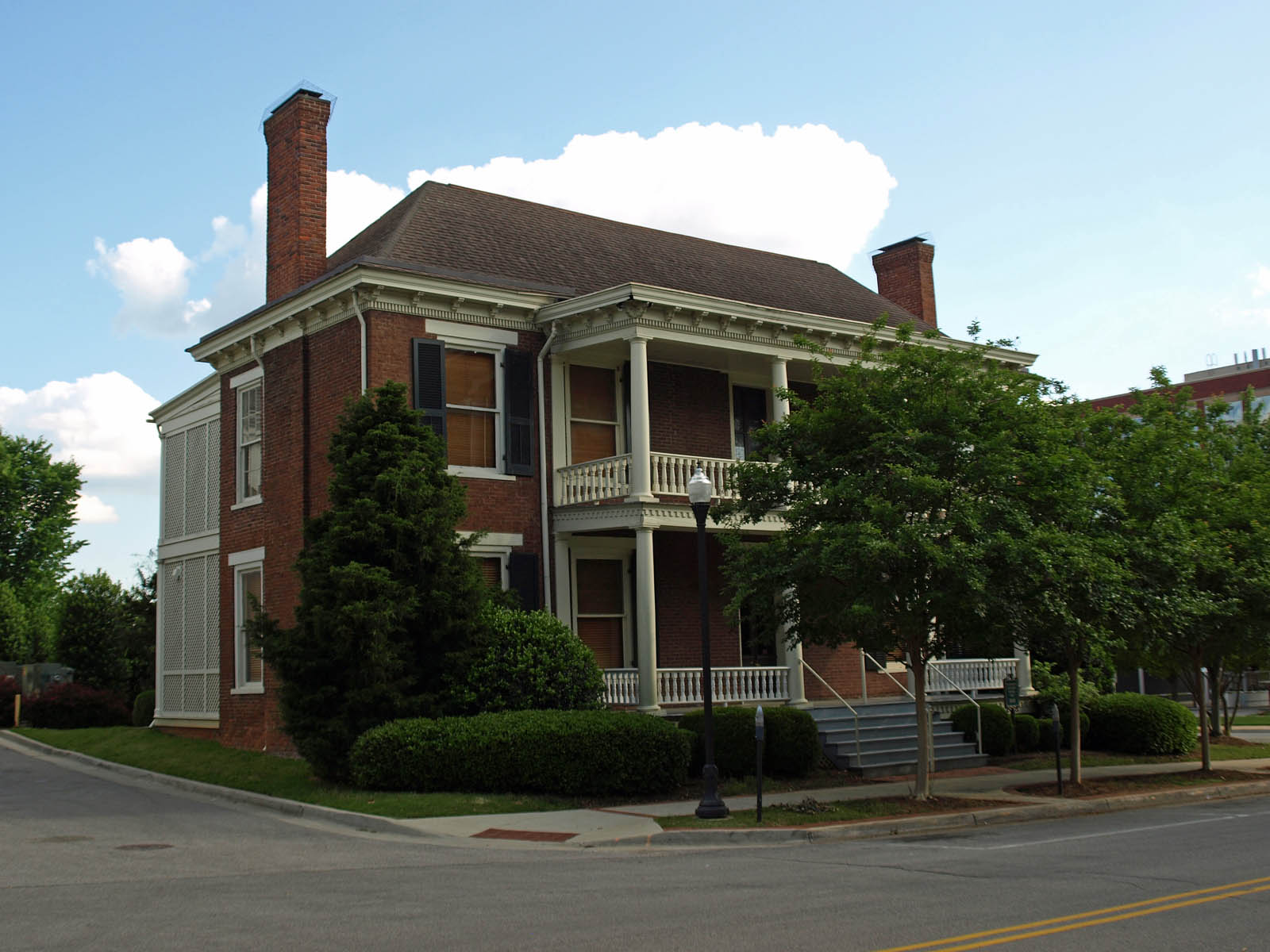
- The house in May 2011

- Location within Huntsville, Alabama Location within Alabama Location within the United States
- Location: 102 Gates Ave., Huntsville, Alabama
- Coordinates: 34°43′41″N 86°35′7″W
- Area: less than one acre
- Built: 1848
- Architectural style: Colonial Revival, Georgian Revival
- NRHP reference No.: 77000211
- Added to NRHP: August 3, 1977

The Humphreys–Rodgers House (also known as the David C. Humphreys House) is a historic residence in Huntsville, Alabama. Since its construction in 1848, it has been expanded and altered at least three times, saved from demolition twice, and moved once. The house was built by David Campbell Humphreys, a four-term member of the Alabama House of Representatives and anti-secessionist during the Civil War.

The house was originally a two-story, hall and parlor design with a gable roof. Prior to 1861, an additional room was added to the west of the entrance, creating a three-room plan with a central hall. Many Greek Revival details were added to the interior around this time. The house was extensively modified around 1886, when Augustus D. Rodgers bought the house from Humphreys, who had been appointed a judge on the Supreme Court of the District of Columbia. A one-story, two-room ell was added to the rear of the east side of the house, adding an attached kitchen and dining room. The previous gable roof was replaced with a hipped roof, and a two-story hipped roof portico was added to the façade, giving the house its current Colonial Revival appearance. By 1913, the ell had been replaced with a central, two-story ell that featured a one-story portico with fluted columns.

By the 1970s, the house was vacant and in disrepair, and the encroaching development of a Coca-Cola bottling plant and the Von Braun Center threatened its demolition. Efforts by preservationists led the bottling plant to purchase the house and renovate it for use as offices and a Coca-Cola memorabilia museum. Part of the effort led to the house's listing on the National Register of Historic Places in 1977. In 1990 the bottling plant needed to expand, and the house faced demolition once again. The house was purchased by the Alabama Constitution Village and moved to a site one block from the museum. Today, the house is owned by the City of Huntsville and the property is managed by Global Ties Alabama, who use it for their International Headquarters. The historic Humphreys Rodgers house is available for events both business related and purely social.
