= Matthew M. Graves =

American lawyer (born 1975)

Matthew Graves
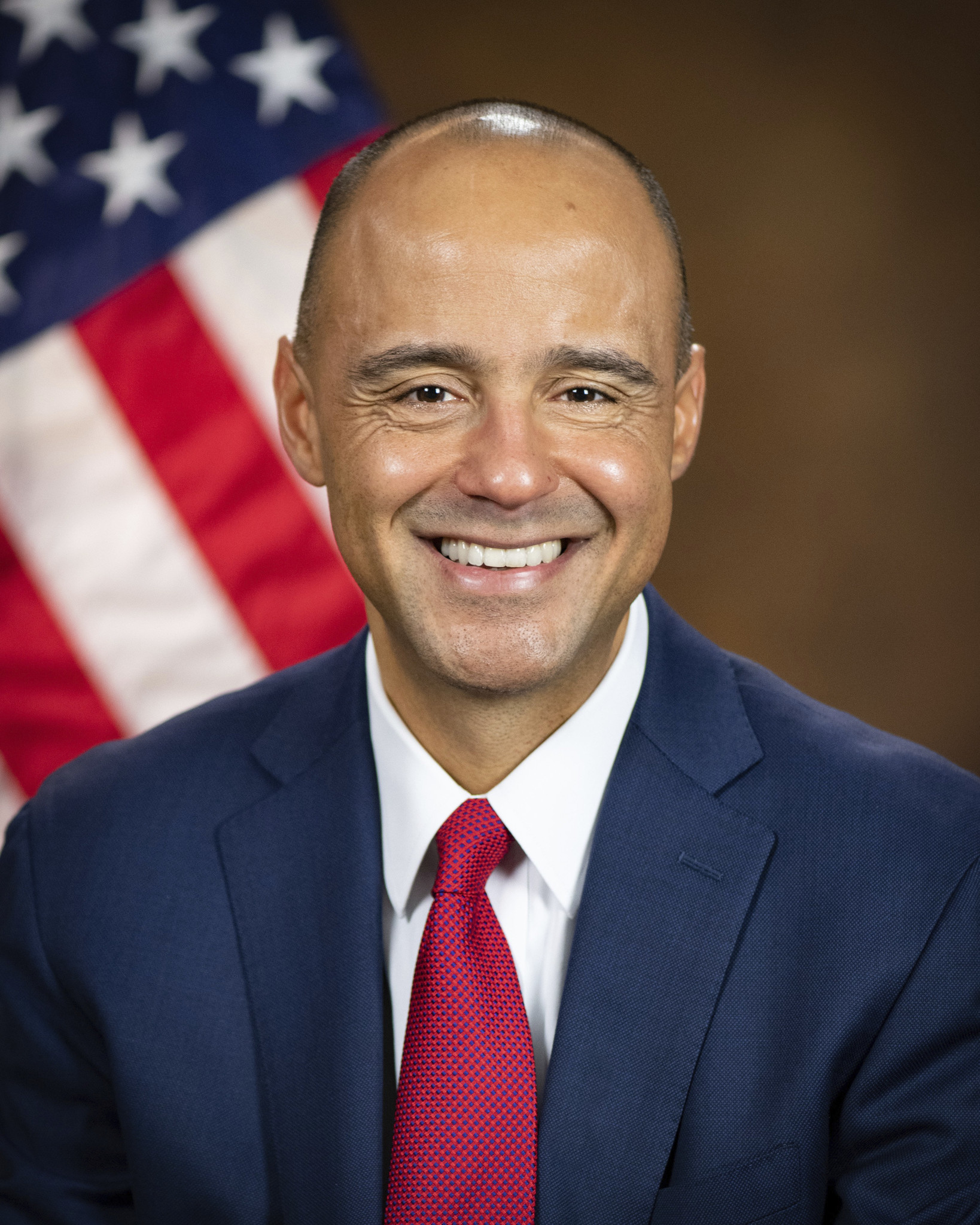

United States Attorney for the District of Columbia
- In office November 5, 2021 – January 16, 2025
- Appointed by: Joe Biden
- Preceded by: Channing D. Phillips (acting)
- Succeeded by: Jeanine Pirro

Personal details
- Born: Matthew Michael Graves; 1975 (age 50–51) Reading, Pennsylvania, U.S.
- Education: Washington and Lee University (BA); Yale University (JD)

Matthew Michael Graves (born 1975) is an American lawyer who served as the United States attorney for the District of Columbia from 2021 to 2025.

== Early life and education ==
Graves was born in Reading, Pennsylvania. He earned a Bachelor of Arts degree from Washington and Lee University in 1998 and a Juris Doctor from Yale Law School in 2001.

== Career ==
After graduating from law school, Graves began his legal career as a law clerk for Judge Richard W. Roberts of the United States District Court for the District of Columbia. From 2002 to 2007, he was an associate at WilmerHale. From 2007 to 2016, Graves worked as an assistant United States attorney in the District of Columbia, where he served in the office's fraud and public corruption section, ultimately serving as the acting chief of the section. From 2016 to 2021, he was a partner at DLA Piper.

At DLA Piper, Graves represented Qatar and foreign banks accused of financing terrorism, including Bank of Palestine, Arab Bank PLC, and Bank of Beirut. Politico reported in 2021 that Graves also represented Gazprom Neft, "a Russian state-owned energy company with a market cap north of $30 billion."

=== United States attorney for the District of Columbia ===
Graves was recommended as U.S. attorney by Delegate Eleanor Holmes Norton. On July 26, 2021, President Joe Biden nominated Graves to serve in the role. On September 23, 2021, his nomination was reported out of committee by voice vote. On October 28, 2021, his nomination was confirmed in the United States Senate. On November 5, 2021, he was sworn into office by Chief Judge Beryl A. Howell. He resigned on January 16, 2025.

On May 16, 2023, U.S. Representative Marjorie Taylor Greene announced that she planned to introduce articles of impeachment against Graves for his prosecution of participants in the January 6 United States Capitol attack.

Under Graves, the US Attorney's Office declined to prosecute 67% of those arrested for crimes in DC in 2022, including 72% of misdemeanor arrests and 53% of felony arrests.

On December 30, 2024, he announced his resignation effective January 16, 2025.

Legal offices
Preceded by Channing D. Phillips; Acting	United States Attorney for the District of Columbia; 2021–2025	Succeeded by Bridget M. Fitzpatrick; Acting
