= Ronald Machen =

American lawyer (born 1969)

Ronald C. Machen
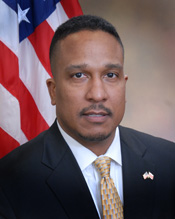

United States Attorney for the District of Columbia
- In office February 2010 – March 31, 2015
- Appointed by: Barack Obama
- Preceded by: Kenneth L. Wainstein
- Succeeded by: Channing D. Phillips

Personal details
- Born: May 6, 1969 (age 57)
- Education: Stanford University (B.A.); Harvard Law School (J.D.)

Ronald C. Machen Jr. (born May 6, 1969) is the former United States Attorney for the District of Columbia. In April 2015, he left the position and returned to the law firm WilmerHale after the longest tenure as US Attorney for the District of Columbia in more than 35 years.

== Early life and education ==
Machen grew up in Detroit, Michigan. He attended Stanford University, where he was a walk-on wide receiver for the Stanford Cardinal football team. Machen graduated from Stanford in 1991 with bachelor degrees in economics and political science. He earned his Juris Doctor from Harvard Law School in 1994. After graduating from Harvard, Machen served as a law clerk to Damon J. Keith, U.S. Court of Appeals for the Sixth Circuit.

== Career ==
Mr. Machen began his career in U.S. government as an Assistant U.S. Attorney in the U.S. Attorney's Office for the District of Columbia under then U.S. Attorney Eric Holder in January 1997. He held this position for 5 years before returning to private practice in white-collar criminal defense, corporate internal investigations, and civil litigation until 2010.

On December 23, 2009, President Barack Obama nominated Machen to serve as the United States Attorney for the District of Columbia. He was confirmed by the United States Senate on February 11, 2010.

Machen prosecuted numerous corruption cases involving Jesse Jackson Jr. and the administration of D.C. mayor Vincent C. Gray.

On September 12, 2014, Machen set up the first federal unit in the nation to identify and investigate cases that ended in wrongful convictions. The unit reviews cases in which defendants convicted of violent felonies can offer new evidence, such as DNA testing, that may establish innocence. A number of prosecutors’ offices have established similar units in recent years, including the Manhattan District Attorney's Office and the Dallas County District Attorney's Office in Texas.

Machen resigned and, on April 1, 2015, was succeeded by Vincent H. Cohen Jr. as Acting United States Attorney for the District of Columbia.

== Lois Lerner contempt case in the IRS targeting controversy ==
In May 2014, Machen began investigating the embattled director of the tax-exempt organizations division of the Internal Revenue Service, Lois Lerner, for Contempt of Congress with regard to her statements before a congressional committee involving the 2013 IRS targeting controversy.

On March 31, 2015, Machen issued a seven-page letter to Speaker John Boehner of the U.S. House of Representatives to the effect that Machen had concluded that Lerner did not waive her privilege against compelled self-incrimination. Machen asserted that because Lerner made only "general denials" of wrongdoing, her statements did not amount to "testimony" that would have waived her privilege.

Machen also asserted another possible reason that, in his view, Lerner could not be found to have waived her Fifth Amendment privilege. Citing the U.S. Supreme Court decision in McCarthy v. Arndstein, Machen stated that Lerner was an ordinary witness compelled to testify by subpoena and that "where the previous disclosure by an ordinary witness is not an actual admission of guilt or incriminating facts, he is not deprived of the privilege of stopping short in his testimony whenever it may fairly tend to incriminate him."

== National security leaks ==
Machen participated in a number of prosecutions of individuals involved in the dissemination of information of natural security interest. One such notable case included the application of the Espionage Act against Dr. Stephen Jin-Woo Kim after Kim told a reporter that North Korea would probably test its nuclear program. The case was controversial because it was one of a string of unprecedented uses of the Espionage Act against officials for speaking with journalists .

Machen's office successfully prosecuted individuals who conspired to provide information to Cuba, Israel, and a Chinese nuclear construction firm.

== 2012 Benghazi ==
Shortly after the 2012 attack on the American embassy in Benghazi, Libya, and the death of the American ambassador, the U.S. Attorney of Washington, D.C. was assigned the case. Ahmad Khattala has been arrested and awaits trial. Questions have been raised why this case is being handled in this office, and not others with more experience in this type of case.

== Public corruption ==
Over 160 guilty pleas were acquired during his tenure including, most notably three District of Columbia council members Harry Thomas Jr., Kwame Brown, and Michael A. Brown. His office also successfully obtained a conviction of Congressman Jesse L. Jackson Jr. for conspiracy to defraud his campaign of $750,000.

== Investigation of Mayor Gray ==
Between 2011 and 2015, Machen led an investigation into the 2010 District of Columbia mayoral election that led to the felony convictions of six people – including several top associates of Mayor Vincent Gray – involved in secretly funneling $653,000 to support Gray's 2010 campaign. In March 2014, Machen and other law enforcement officials held a press conference to announce the guilty plea of contractor Jeffrey Thompson, who admitted to conspiring with Gray during the 2010 campaign. The announcement, which came just weeks before the Democratic primary, was widely believed to influence the 2014 Mayoral Election and Muriel Bowser's primary victory. In December 2015, Machen's successor, Channing D. Phillips, closed the investigation without filing criminal charges against Gray.

== Blackwater conviction ==
In 2014, Machen's office successfully convicted 4 former Blackwater guards who participated in the mass killing of Iraqi civilians in Nusoor Square.
