= Thomas H. Anderson (judge) =

American judge (1848–1916)

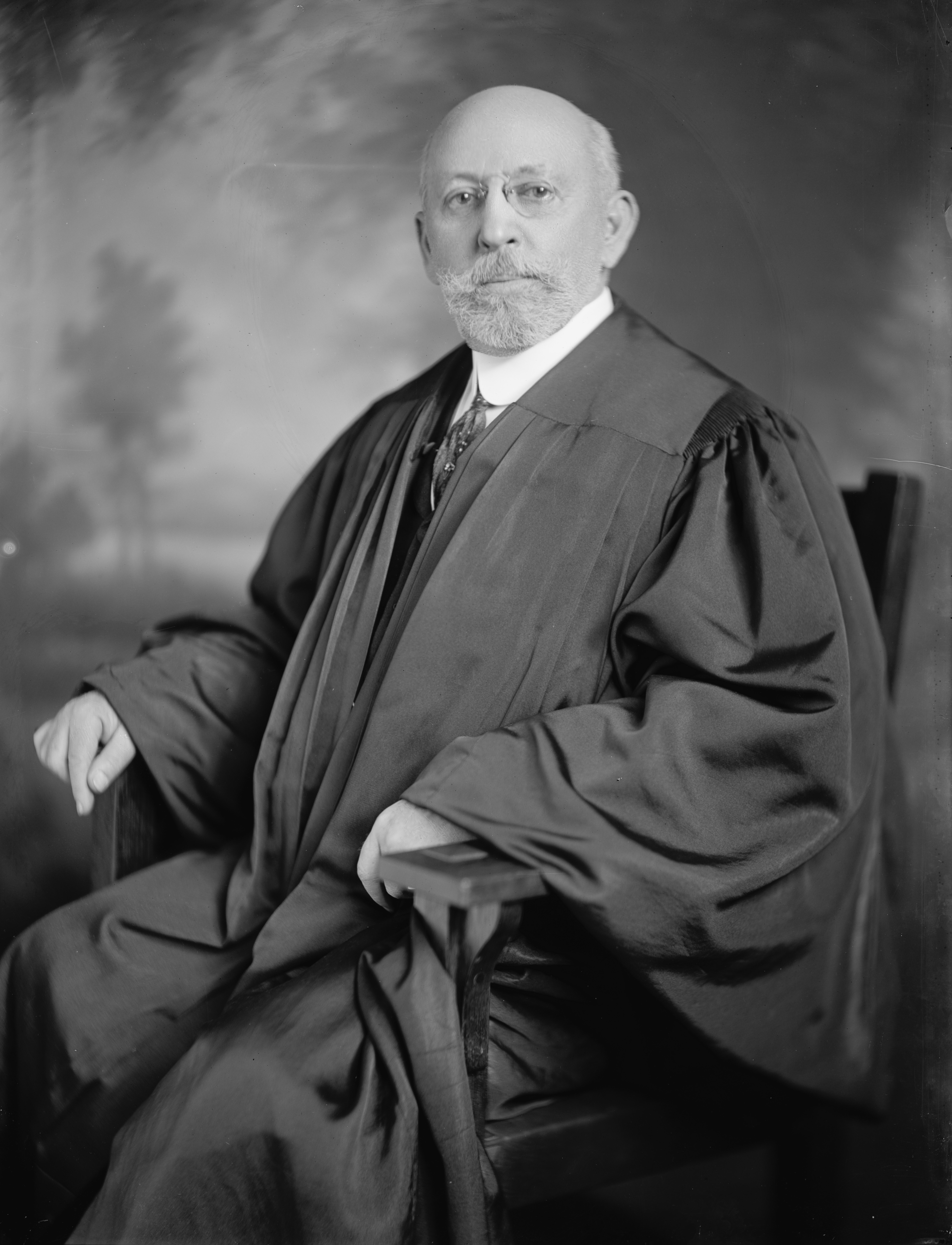
- Portrait of Anderson, c. 1905–1916

Associate Justice of the Supreme Court of the District of Columbia
- In office April 23, 1901 – September 30, 1916
- Appointed by: William McKinley (recess); Theodore Roosevelt (commission)
- Preceded by: Charles Cleaves Cole
- Succeeded by: William Hitz

Personal details
- Born: Thomas Henry Anderson; June 6, 1848; Belmont County, Ohio, U.S.
- Died: September 30, 1916 (aged 68); Denver, Colorado, U.S.
- Resting place: Rock Creek Cemetery
- Political party: Republican
- Spouse: Laura B. Augustine (m. 1879)
- Children: 1
- Education: Mount Union College
- Occupation: Politician; educator; lawyer; judge

Thomas Henry Anderson (June 6, 1848 – September 30, 1916) was an Associate Justice of the Supreme Court of the District of Columbia.

== Early life ==
Thomas Henry Anderson was born on June 6, 1848, in Belmont County, Ohio, to Amelia (née Dallas) and John Anderson. He attended public schools and Mount Union College. He taught at schools in Belmont and Guernsey counties. He then was a high school principal at Cambridge High School in Cambridge, Ohio, until his resignation in 1870 to finish his law studies. In June 1871, he was admitted to the law in Cambridge.

== Law and political career ==
Anderson was in a private law practice in Cambridge with Joseph D. Taylor from 1871 to 1883. After Taylor joined Congress, Anderson led the practice until he started the firm Anderson & Locke with John L. Locke. The law firm would dissolve in April 1893. Anderson served as the rank of general in the staff of Ohio Governor Charles Foster. In 1887, he was a candidate for attorney general of Ohio. He was chairman of the Republican Executive Committee of Guernsey County, member of Cambridge's city council and school board, and president of multiple corporations. He was appointed by President Benjamin Harrison and served as the United States Envoy Extraordinary and Minister Plenipotentiary to Bolivia from 1889 to 1893. Following the request of James G. Blaine, he wrote the Handbook of Bolivia in 1893. He practiced law in Washington, D.C., from 1893 to 1899. He served as the United States Attorney for the District of Columbia from 1899 to 1901.

== Federal judicial service ==
Anderson received a recess appointment from President William McKinley on April 23, 1901, to an Associate Justice seat on the Supreme Court of the District of Columbia (now the United States District Court for the District of Columbia) vacated by Associate Justice Charles Cleaves Cole. He was nominated to the same position by President Theodore Roosevelt on December 5, 1901. He was confirmed by the United States Senate on February 4, 1902, and received his commission on February 6, 1902. His service terminated on October 1, 1916, due to his death.

== Personal life ==
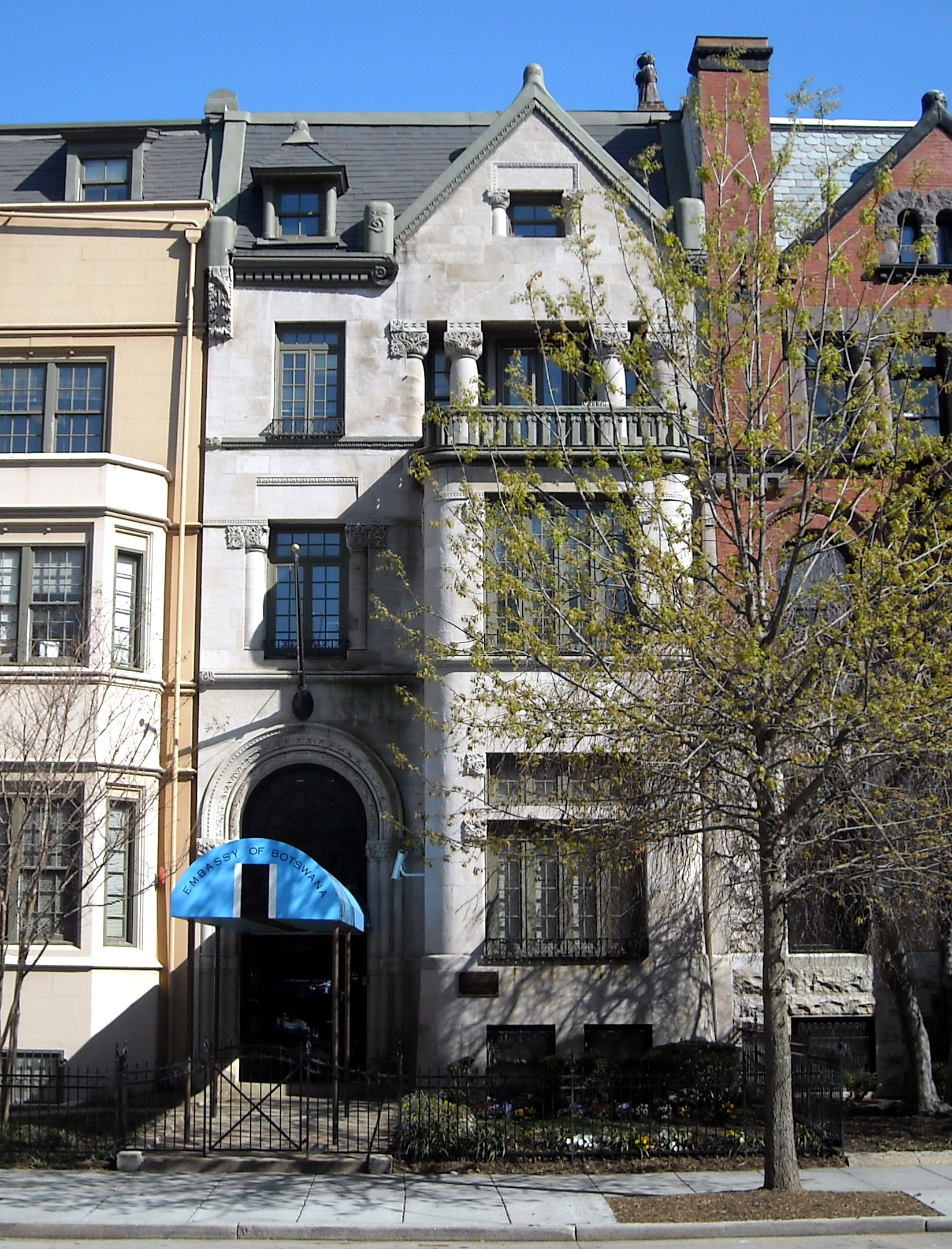
Former residence of Thomas H. Anderson on New Hampshire Avenue NW, Washington, D.C.

Anderson married Laura B. Augustine, daughter of Daniel and Mary Augustine, of Addison, Pennsylvania, in 1879. They had one daughter, Perie Augustine. His daughter married a son of Connecticut Governor George L. Lilley. He was a member of the Sons of the American Revolution, Ohio Society of New York, Historical Society of Washington, D.C., Chevy Chase Club, member of the board of trustees of American University and Howard University, and a member and served as president of the board of trustees of the Metropolitan Methodist Episcopal Church in Washington, D.C. He was personal friends with William McKinley. He lived on New Hampshire Avenue NW in Washington, D.C. Later in life, he had a summer home in Colorado Springs, Colorado.

Following an operation, Anderson died at St. Joseph's Hospital in Denver. He was buried in Rock Creek Cemetery.

== Awards ==
Anderson received an honorary Doctor of Laws from Mount Union College.

== Sources ==
Legal offices
Preceded by Charles Cleaves Cole	Associate Justice of the Supreme Court of the District of Columbia; 1901–1916	Succeeded by William Hitz
