= Contessa Brewer =

American journalist (born 1974)

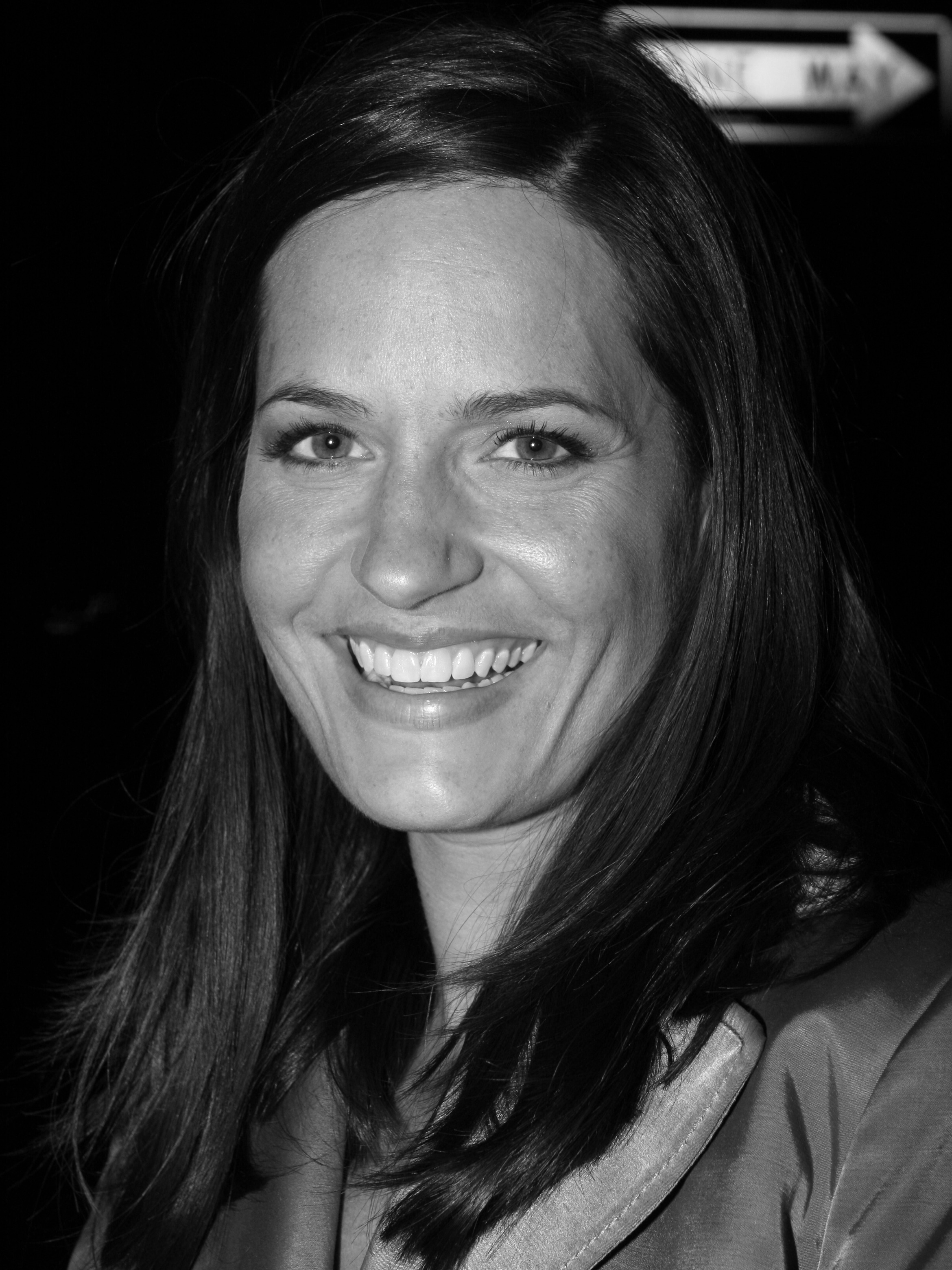
- Brewer at Waverly Inn in New York City, New York on November 16, 2007.
- Born: March 16, 1974 (age 52); Parsonsfield, Maine, U.S.
- Education: Newhouse School, Syracuse University (B.S.)
- Occupations: Television news anchor and host
- Years active: 1997–present
- Notable credit: Verdict with Dan Abrams
- Children: 2

Contessa Brewer (born March 16, 1974) is an American television journalist for CNBC Business News. As a correspondent, she covers casinos and gaming. She is also a substitute anchor. She formerly hosted the MSNBC weekend program Caught on Camera and was also a correspondent for NBC News and an anchor at NBC's flagship station WNBC.

== Early life and education ==
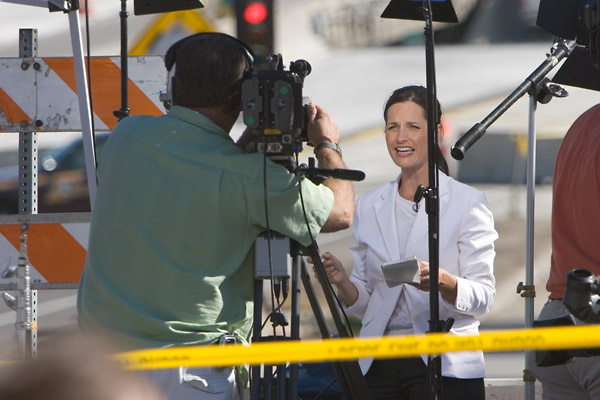
Brewer at the site of the collapse of the I-35W Mississippi River bridge

Brewer was born in Parsonsfield, Maine, and graduated from Sacopee Valley High School in Hiram, Maine, in 1992. She graduated magna cum laude from Syracuse University's Newhouse School of Public Communications with a B.S. in Broadcast Journalism in 1996, as well as a Certificate of Contemporary Europe following her political studies in Strasbourg, France.

== Career ==
Brewer joined MSNBC in September 2003, after working for WTMJ-TV in Milwaukee, Wisconsin as a weekend anchor and general assignment reporter. She has also worked for KMIR-TV in Palm Springs, California from 1997 to 1999, and KRNV-TV in Reno, Nevada.

In spring 2005, Brewer served briefly as a news reader on the Imus in the Morning radio show, which was syndicated nationally. Her tenure was brief; she became embroiled in a public feud with Don Imus after the New York Post published a gossip item in which she was allegedly overheard disparaging the radio personality. Imus replied, on air, with his own disparaging remarks directed at Brewer. She later appeared as the news reader on Verdict with Dan Abrams before its cancellation in 2008. She and Dan Abrams would discuss the "Winners and Losers" of the day, as well as reading responses from readers. Brewer hosted MSNBC Live weekdays at noon, until her departure on August 26, 2011.

In January 2010, New Hampshire Senator Judd Gregg, a guest on It's the Economy, hosted by Brewer and Melissa Francis, called for cuts in the federal budget. When Gregg failed to respond to Francis' questions concerning the specific cuts he supported, Brewer pressed him, asking "Which programs are you willing to cut? Are you willing to tell schools, no money for you?" Gregg reacted by saying Brewer was "absurd", "fundamentally dishonest", "irresponsible" and lacked "integrity" for her handling of interviews, and stated "in your introduction to me, you said that, that education funding would be cut."

In August 2009, Brewer was criticized by conservative blogs for a story about a man carrying an AR-15 rifle at an Obama appearance in Phoenix, Arizona, on August 17. MSNBC was accused of editing the video to conceal the race of the man, who was black, and Brewer commented "you have a man of color in the presidency and white people showing up with guns strapped to their waists or to their legs."

In May 2010, Brewer received criticism for her comments about the Times Square car bomb attempt:

There was part of me that was hoping this was not going to be anybody with ties to any kind of Islamic country, because there are a lot of people who want to use this terrorist intent to justify writing off people who believe in a certain way or come from certain countries or whose skin color is a certain way. I mean they use it as justification for really outdated bigotry.

On July 20, 2011, while interviewing Representative Mo Brooks (R-AL) on MSNBC regarding the debt crisis, Brewer asserted: "We were looking at going ... reverting a depression at that point." When Brooks said he disagreed, Brewer challenged, "Do you have a degree in economics?" Brooks replied "Yes ma'am, I do. Highest honors." According to his Congressional web site, "Mo graduated from Duke University in three years with a double major in political science and economics, with highest honors in economics. In 1978, he graduated from the University of Alabama Law School." After the interview, Brewer commented on her Facebook page that she "just learned why lawyers are told never to ask a question they don't know the answer to."

On August 26, 2011, Brewer announced at the conclusion of her regular anchoring hour on MSNBC that she would no longer be serving as an anchor for the network. Brewer stated that she would continue hosting Caught on Camera and filing reports for NBC news but that she would be pursuing other opportunities in the future.

In March 2012, Brewer began doing fill-in anchor work for WNBC in New York City, mostly on weekends.

In 2017, Brewer joined CNBC full-time as a correspondent and fill-in anchor.

== Personal life ==
In 2013, Brewer gave birth to twin boys.
