= David Campbell Humphreys =

American judge

Associate Justice of the Supreme Court of the District of Columbia
- In office May 13, 1870 – July 12, 1879
- Appointed by: Ulysses S. Grant
- Preceded by: George P. Fisher
- Succeeded by: Charles Pinckney James

Member of the Alabama House of Representatives
- In office 1843; 1849; 1853; 1868

Personal details
- Born: David Campbell Humphreys; November 9, 1817 Morgan County, Alabama
- Died: July 12, 1879 (aged 61) Fairfax County, Virginia, U.S.

David Campbell Humphreys (November 9, 1817 – July 12, 1879) was an associate justice of the Supreme Court of the District of Columbia.

== Education and career ==
Born in Morgan County, Alabama, Humphreys began the practice of law in Madison County, Alabama. He was a member of the Alabama House of Representatives in 1843, 1849, 1853, and 1868. He was a planter and in private practice in Huntsville, Alabama from 1850 to 1861. During the American Civil War, he served in the Confederate States Army, rising to the rank of Colonel.

== Federal judicial service ==
Humphreys was nominated by President Ulysses S. Grant on April 22, 1870, to an Associate Justice seat on the Supreme Court of the District of Columbia (now the United States District Court for the District of Columbia) vacated by Associate Justice George P. Fisher. He was confirmed by the United States Senate on May 10, 1870, and received his commission on May 13, 1870. His service terminated on July 2, 1879, due to his death in Fairfax County, Virginia.

== Unsuccessful nomination ==
In 1873, President Grant nominated Humphreys to a joint seat on the United States District Court for the Middle District of Alabama, the United States District Court for the Northern District of Alabama and the United States District Court for the Southern District of Alabama, in an effort to replace the increasingly unpopular Judge Richard Busteed with an Alabama native (Busteed was simultaneously nominated to take Humphreys' seat in the District of Columbia), but the nomination was returned by the Senate as irregular.

== Home ==
Humphreys' house in Huntsville, built in 1848, was listed on the National Register of Historic Places in 1977.

== Sources ==
Legal offices
Preceded by George P. Fisher	Associate Justice of the Supreme Court of the District of Columbia; 1870–1879	Succeeded by Charles Pinckney James
