= Michael R. Sherwin =

American lawyer (born 1971)

Michael Sherwin
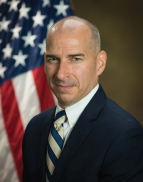

Acting United States Attorney for the District of Columbia
- In office May 19, 2020 – March 3, 2021
- Preceded by: Timothy Shea (acting)
- Succeeded by: Channing D. Phillips (acting)

Personal details
- Born: Michael Rafi Sherwin; December 8, 1971 (age 54) Ohio, U.S.
- Education: Ohio State University (BA); University of Notre Dame (JD)

Military service
- Branch/service: United States Navy
- Years of service: 1999–2004
- Battles/wars: Operation Southern Watch; Operation Northern Watch; Operation Enduring Freedom; Operation Iraqi Freedom
- Awards: Joint Service Commendation Medal with Oak leaf cluster

Michael Rafi Sherwin (born December 8, 1971) is an attorney who served as the acting United States Attorney for the District of Columbia from 2020 to 2021. He was appointed by Attorney General William Barr during the Trump administration. He is a partner at TolmanSherwin, a firm he co-founded with former U.S. Attorney Brett Tolman in 2025 specializing in complex government investigations.

== Education ==
Raised in Cleveland, Ohio, Sherwin earned his B.A. in political science and liberal arts at the Ohio State University in 1994 and his J.D. at the University of Notre Dame in 1998.

== Military career ==
Sherwin served as a naval intelligence officer from 1999 to 2004, participating in Operation Southern Watch, Operation Northern Watch, Operation Enduring Freedom, and Operation Iraqi Freedom. Sherwin served aboard both the USS John F. Kennedy and USS Theodore Roosevelt as the lead intelligence briefer and targeting officer for Navy fighter squadron VFA-82. Post-9/11, Sherwin joined the intelligence staff of General Tommy Franks at the United States Central Command assisting in the planning of military combat operations in Afghanistan and Iraq. Sherwin was awarded the Joint Service Commendation Medal Oak Leaf Cluster in 2003, among other commendations.

== Legal career ==
Sherwin began his legal career as a law clerk for Chief Judge Paul Ramon Matia, U.S. District Court, Northern District of Ohio. In 2008, he became an Assistant U.S. Attorney for the Southern District of Florida. In 2011, then Attorney General Eric Holder appointed him to serve as part of a special detail for the United States Department of State prosecuting terrorists in Bagram, Afghanistan, where he assisted in more than 120 primary court terrorism trials and 250 appellate cases convened by the Afghan judicial tribunal.

During his time as assistant U.S. attorney, Sherwin prosecuted Colombian and Venezuelan drug cartels and kingpins, including the successful conviction of Sigifredo Maya, a top member of the Medellín Cartel. Sherwin also won multiple convictions of developers and contractors who had stolen tens of millions of dollars from the Low Income Housing Tax Credit program which is supposed to provide housing for people in need. In 2016, he ran the country's largest task force on health care fraud which led the department in health care fraud indictments, trials and asset forfeitures. In 2018 Sherwin joined the Miami office's national security section where he prosecuted counterintelligence cases, economic espionage, and state-sanctioned theft of trade secrets and digital currency.

In September 2019, Sherwin won the conviction of a Chinese woman, Yujing Zhang, who trespassed at President Donald Trump’s Mar-a-Lago Club in Florida.

In 2019, Sherwin became associate deputy attorney general for national security advising Attorney General William Barr and Deputy Attorney General Jeffrey A. Rosen at the Justice Department in Washington D.C.

Sherwin investigated a deadly December 2019 shooting at a naval air station in Pensacola, Florida. During the investigation he met and impressed Attorney General William Barr, officials told The Washington Post.

== U.S. Attorney's Office for the District of Columbia ==
Barr asked Sherwin to become the deputy of Timothy Shea at the District of Columbia office in March 2020. Sherwin was named acting U.S. Attorney in April 2020 when Shea, after three months as U.S. Attorney, was appointed to lead the Drug Enforcement Administration. Trump nominated Justin Herdman to be Shea's permanent successor.

Some high-profile investigations the U.S. Attorney's office handled are related to special counsel Robert Mueller's Russia investigation.

=== Michael Flynn case ===
In May 2020, Barr moved to dismiss the guilty plea of former Trump national security adviser Michael Flynn. Flynn had pleaded guilty to charges of lying to the Federal Bureau of Investigation about his conversations in 2016 with Russia's ambassador. Sherwin approved the decision to give to Flynn's defense team internal FBI records that the government cited in its dismissal motion, an official told The Washington Post. Sherwin joined Barr's effort to drop charges in a move that was seen as controversial. Some alleged Sherwin was acting politically to protect Trump allies under Barr's orders, while others cited Sherwin's long history as an apolitical prosecutor in making prosecutorial decisions.

=== BLM Protests ===
Sherwin's office arrested hundreds of people in the wake of weeks of protests in D.C. following the murder of George Floyd. The actions took a curious turn when Sherwin, acting in his position as U.S. Attorney at Trump's discretion, came to the defense of Black Lives Matter protestors that DC Mayor Muriel Bowser wanted charged with crimes. Bowser publicly criticized Sherwin for not bringing enough charges against the protesters. Sherwin fired back in a public letter saying her police department had not produced the bare minimum of evidence. "Surely, by your comments, you are not suggesting that this Office skirt constitutional protections and due process," Sherwin wrote.

=== Other cases ===
On May 28, 2020, Sherwin announced the indictment of 28 North Korean and five Chinese citizens charged with laundering more than $2.5 billion in illegal payments for North Korea's nuclear weapons and missile program.

In June 2020, Sherwin closed a three-year-long investigation into whether a state-owned Egyptian bank had secretly financed a $10 million loan by Trump to his political campaign in the days shortly before the 2016 presidential election.

In December 2020, Sherwin charged bombmaker Abu Agila Mas’ud in a criminal complaint with designing and building the bomb which took down Pan Am Flight 103 in 1988 over Lockerbie, Scotland, killing all 270 people aboard.

=== Capitol Riots ===
Through March 2021, Sherwin supervised the early months of investigations into the 2021 storming of the United States Capitol charging 325 individuals. Several participants were indicted on conspiracy charges during Sherwin's tenure and he stated in media interviews he believed the evidence would support possible sedition charges against some participants in the incident. The Biden administration and, later, Attorney General Merrick Garland asked Sherwin to stay on at the Justice Department in another role to continue the prosecutions.

Sherwin left the Justice Department in April 2021. During his last week as acting U.S. Attorney, Sherwin did an interview with 60 Minutes in which he said, "I personally believe the evidence is trending toward" seditious conspiracy charges, which echoed comments he had made in previous interviews. Two days later, federal Judge Amit Mehta convened an emergency hearing criticizing Sherwin for the comments. While department referrals are required to remain private, federal prosecutor John Crabb announced in open court that Sherwin had been referred to the department's ethics office for conducting a media interview without official permission and commenting on a pending case. Some observers called Sherwin's comments "improper", but others came to his defense, saying he provided the public "some much-needed and welcome insight" into the cases.

On March 3, 2021, the Biden administration appointed Channing D. Phillips acting U.S. Attorney for D.C.

In April 2021, Sherwin joined the law firm Kobre & Kim as a partner where he handled international government investigations for four years before leaving to start his own firm.

== Personal life ==
Sherwin is the son of Allen Lewis Sherwin and Nora (Schlachet) Sherwin and the father of three boys.

== See also ==
- List of Jewish American jurists
