= Sacopee Valley High School =

Location
- 115 South Hiram Road; Hiram, ME 04041; United States; 43°48′39″N 70°52′10″W

Information
- Type: Public
- Established: 1967
- School district: MSAD 55
- Principal: Britton Wolfe
- Enrollment: 290 (2023-2024)
- Campus: Rural
- Colors: Royal Blue and White
- Athletics: 13 sports
- Mascot: Hawk
- Website: svhs.sad55.org

Sacopee Valley High School, founded 1967, is the public school for Maine School Administration District 55 (MSAD 55). It is located in Hiram, in the U.S. state of Maine. It was built to replace Porter High School, which is now the Porter Town Hall. The school covers the towns of Hiram, Porter, Parsonsfield, Cornish, and Baldwin.

== The name "Sacopee" ==
This High School is located in Hiram between the "Saco" and "Ossipee" rivers. This location inspired the high school to be named "Sacopee".

== Athletics ==
Sacopee Valley High School's athletic teams play in Class C of the Western Maine Conference. In fall, students can play football, boys' & girls' Soccer, boys' & girls' cross country, field hockey, golf, and cheerleading. In winter, students can play boys' & girls' basketball, cheerleading, and ice hockey on a club team involving Windham High School. In spring, students can participate in baseball, softball, and track.

All home games are played at SVHS, either out on the athletic fields or in the gymnasium, except for golf, which all home matches are played at Province Lake and ice hockey played at Bridgton Academy Ice Rink in Bridgton.

== Notable people ==
- Contessa Brewer, MSNBC News Anchor (alumni)
