= Justin Herdman =

American attorney

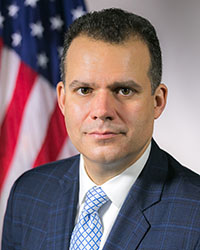

United States Attorney for the Northern District of Ohio
- In office August 21, 2017 – January 8, 2021
- President: Donald Trump
- Preceded by: Carole Rendon
- Succeeded by: Bridget M. Brennan (acting) Marisa Darden (nominated)

Personal details
- Education: Ohio University (BA); University of Glasgow (MPhil); Harvard University (JD)

Justin Herdman is an American lawyer who served as the United States Attorney for the Northern District of Ohio from 2017 to 2021.

Previously, Herdman was a partner in the investigations and white collar defense practice group at Jones Day, a Judge Advocate General in the United States Air Force Reserve, and an adjunct law professor at Case Western Reserve University.

== Education and legal career ==
Herdman received his Bachelor of Arts from Ohio University in 1996, his Master of Philosophy from the University of Glasgow in 1998, and his Juris Doctor from Harvard Law School in 2001.

Herdman was an Assistant District Attorney in New York City from 2001 to 2005. He also spent time as an associate at Vorys, Sater, Seymour and Pease. From 2006 to 2013, Herdman was an Assistant United States Attorney in Cleveland. In this position, he prosecuted a number of terrorism cases, including the case of five activists who plotted to blow up the Ohio 82 Bridge spanning the Cuyahoga Valley National Park in 2012. Prior to becoming a U.S. Attorney, Herdman was a partner at Jones Day.

== United States Attorney for the Northern District of Ohio ==
In June 2017, Herdman was nominated by President Donald Trump to become the United States Attorney for the Northern District of Ohio. The U.S. Attorney's Office in the Northern District of Ohio prosecutes cases in 40 counties, including areas in and around Cleveland, Akron, Youngstown, and Toledo. Herdman was recommended for the position by U.S. Senators Sherrod Brown (D-Ohio) and Rob Portman (R-Ohio). The U.S. Senate confirmed Herdman's nomination on August 3, 2017. He resigned on January 8, 2021.

== Expired nomination for United States Attorney for the District of Columbia ==
On May 18, 2020, President Trump announced his intent to nominate Herdman to be the next United States Attorney for the District of Columbia. On August 11, 2020, his nomination was sent to the Senate. On January 3, 2021, his nomination was returned to the President under Rule XXXI, Paragraph 6 of the United States Senate.
