= Arthur A. Birney =

American lawyer (1852–1916)

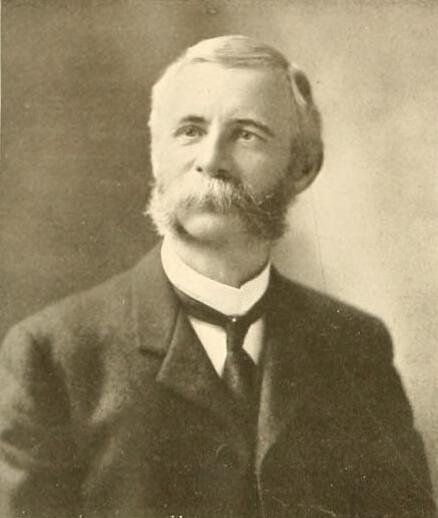
- Birney in a 1903 publication
- Born: Arthur Alexis Birney; May 28, 1852; Paris, France
- Died: September 4, 1916 (aged 64); Virginia, U.S.
- Resting place: Rock Creek Cemetery
- Education: University of Michigan Law School
- Occupation: Lawyer
- Political party: Republican
- Spouse: Helen Conway (m. 1895)
- Children: 7
- Father: William Birney
- Relatives: James G. Birney (grandfather); David B. Birney (uncle); James M. Birney (uncle)

Arthur Alexis Birney (May 28, 1852 – September 4, 1916) was an American lawyer who served as United States Attorney for the District of Columbia from 1893 to 1897.

== Early life ==
Arthur Alexis Birney was born on May 28, 1852, in Paris, to Catherine (née Hoffman) and William Birney. His paternal grandfather James G. Birney was an abolitionist and Free Soil candidate for U.S. President. His father and his uncle David B. Birney were lawyers and served in the Civil War. Another uncle, James M. Birney was lieutenant governor of Michigan.

Birney and his parents moved back to the United States and he attended public schools in Cleveland, Ohio. He graduated from Cleveland High School. He graduated with a law degree from the University of Michigan Law School in 1873.

== Career ==
After graduating, Birney moved to Washington, D.C., and was admitted to the bar. In 1874, he was appointed assistant to the attorney for the Commissioners of Washington, D.C. He continued there until his appointment as Assistant United States Attorney in 1875. He resigned that office in December 1877 and joined the firm Birney & Birney as a junior member. The firm was run by his father. He served in the role until February 1893. He was a Republican.

In 1893, Birney was appointed by President Benjamin Harrison as United States Attorney for the District of Columbia. He helped prosecute the Sugar Trust Case. He helped indict Elverton R. Chapman for refusing to answer questions asked by a Senate investigating committee. He also indicted Henry W. Howgate for making a false certificate as a disbursing officer. He was involved in the prosecution of members of Coxey's Army. According to one source, he was the first to convict a defendant of murder for causing the death of a premature infant using abortion. He retired from the U.S. Attorney's office in 1897 and became senior partner at Birney & Woodard. In 1897, he was special counsel for the Commissioners of Washington, D.C., in a matter about highway extensions. In 1898, he aided in the prosecution of U.S. Senator William A. Clark of Montana under the direction of the Senate Committee on Privileges and Elections, which resulted in the senator's resignation.

Birney was a faculty member of Howard University School of Law for over 20 years. Prior to his death, he was counsel on the "home rule" committee that attempted to oust Washington, D.C., commissioner Oliver Peck Newman for not meeting residence requirements.

== Personal life ==
Birney married Helen Conway, daughter of Jane S. and Richard H. Conway, of Baltimore on November 3, 1895. They had seven children, Richard C., Margaret M., Edith S., William M., Dion S., Helen and Catherine.

Birney died of heart failure on September 4, 1916, while playing golf at the Washington Country Club in Virginia. He was buried in Rock Creek Cemetery.
