= Bridget M. Brennan =

American judge (born 1974)

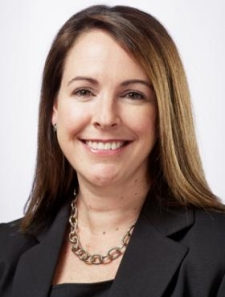

Judge of the United States District Court for the Northern District of Ohio
- Incumbent
- Assumed office February 8, 2022
- Appointed by: Joe Biden
- Preceded by: Dan Polster

United States Attorney for the Northern District of Ohio
- Acting
- In office January 8, 2021 – February 8, 2022
- President: Donald Trump; Joe Biden
- Preceded by: Justin Herdman
- Succeeded by: Michelle M. Baeppler (acting)

Personal details
- Born: Bridget Maeve Meehan; 1974 (age 51–52) Camp Hill, Pennsylvania, U.S.
- Education: John Carroll University (BA); Case Western Reserve University (JD)

Bridget Meehan Brennan (née Bridget Maeve Meehan, born 1974) is an American lawyer from Ohio who serves as a United States district judge of the United States District Court for the Northern District of Ohio. She served as acting United States attorney for the Northern District of Ohio from 2021 to 2022.

== Education ==
Brennan received her Bachelor of Arts from John Carroll University in 1997 and her Juris Doctor from the Case Western Reserve University School of Law in 2000.

== Career ==
Brennan was previously an associate at BakerHostetler in Cleveland from 2000 to 2007. She served in the U.S. Attorney's office from 2007 to 2022, including first assistant United States attorney from 2018 to 2021, chief of the Criminal Division from 2017 to 2018, chief of the Civil Rights unit from 2015 to 2017, and ethics advisor from 2013 to 2018. From January 2021 to February 2022, she served as the acting United States attorney, and in turn chief federal law enforcement officer for the Northern District of Ohio.

=== Federal judicial service ===
On September 30, 2021, President Joe Biden nominated Brennan to serve as a United States district judge of the United States District Court for the Northern District of Ohio. President Biden nominated Brennan to the seat vacated by Judge Dan Polster, who assumed senior status on January 31, 2021. On November 17, 2021, a hearing on her nomination was held before the Senate Judiciary Committee. During her confirmation hearing, Senator Ted Cruz questioned her over her support for Case Western Reserve University law professor Ayesha Bell Hardaway, who stepped down from her position on a team examining ways to improve the Cleveland Police Department after saying she thought there should be an "honest and frank conversation and reckoning with the violence and the harm that continues to be inflicted against Black communities through law enforcement." On December 16, 2021, her nomination was reported out of committee by a 16–6 vote. On January 3, 2022, her nomination was returned to the president under Rule XXXI, Paragraph 6 of the United States Senate; she was renominated the same day.

On January 13, 2022, her nomination was reported out of committee by a 15–7 vote. On January 31, 2022, the Senate invoked cloture on her nomination by a 61–30 vote. On February 1, 2022, her nomination was confirmed by a 61–35 vote. She received her judicial commission on February 8, 2022. She was sworn in on February 10, 2022.

Legal offices
Preceded by Justin Herdman	Acting United States Attorney for the Northern District of Ohio; 2021–2022	Vacant
Preceded by Dan Polster	Judge of the United States District Court for the Northern District of Ohio; 2022–present	Incumbent
