= United States Attorney for the District of Columbia =

Representative of US federal government

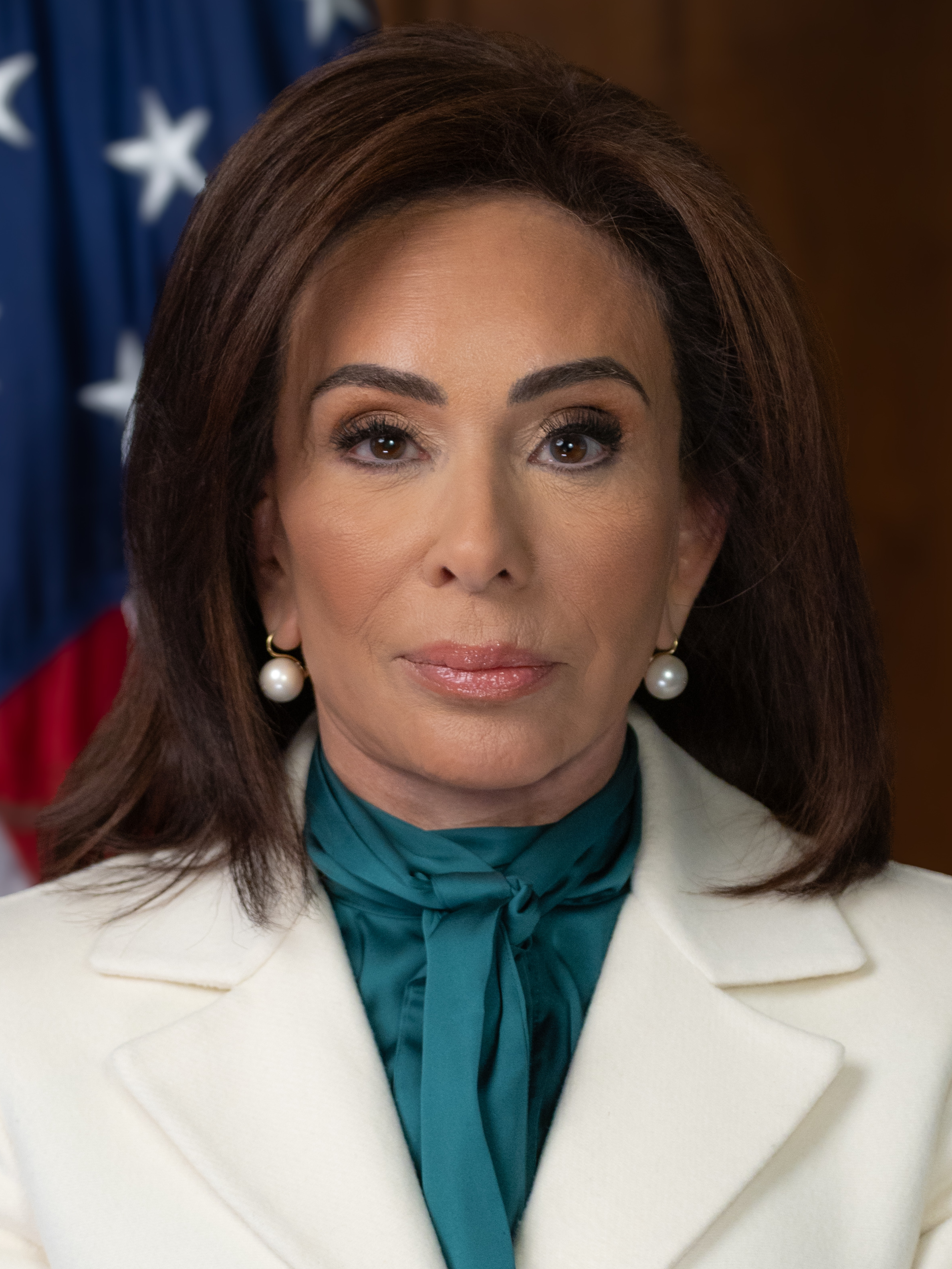
- Incumbent; Jeanine Pirro since May 14, 2025
- United States Department of Justice
- Reports to: The attorney general
- Appointer: The president with Senate advice and consent

The United States attorney for the District of Columbia (USADC) is responsible for representing the federal government in the United States District Court for the District of Columbia. The U.S. Attorney's Office for the District of Columbia has two divisions, the Civil Division and the Criminal Division. The Civil Division is responsible for representing federal agencies in the U.S. District Court for the District of Columbia and in appeals before the U.S. Court of Appeals for the District of Columbia Circuit. The Criminal Division prosecutes federal crimes in the U.S. District Court for the District of Columbia, including cases involving national security, public corruption, violent crime, and narcotics trafficking.

Unlike the states, the District of Columbia is under the exclusive jurisdiction of the U.S. Congress. By statute, the U.S. attorney is responsible for prosecuting both federal crimes and all serious crimes committed by adults in the District of Columbia. Therefore, the U.S. attorney for the District of Columbia serves as both the federal prosecutor (as in the other 92 U.S. attorneys' offices) and as the local district attorney. The attorney general of the District of Columbia, who is elected by the people of the district, handles local civil litigation and minor infractions, comparable with a city attorney.

Because its jurisdiction covers the precincts of the United States Congress and the headquarters of several U.S. government agencies, the USADC is considered one of the most influential U.S. attorneys in the United States, along with the U.S. attorney for the Southern District of New York. Appointment to the role is considered a significant career achievement for prosecutors.

== List of U.S. attorneys for the District of Columbia ==
- John T. Mason: 1801
- Walter Jones Jr.: 1801–1821
- Thomas Swann: 1821–1833
- Francis Scott Key: 1833–1841
- Philip Richard Fendall II: 1841–1845
- James Hoban Jr.: 1845–1846
- Philip Barton Key II: 1846–1849
- Philip Richard Fendall II: 1849–1853
- Philip Barton Key II: 1853–1859
- Robert Ould: 1859–1861
- Edward S. Carrington: 1861–1876
- George P. Fisher: 1870–1875
- Henry H. Wells: 1875–1880
- George B. Corkhill: 1880–1884
- Augustus S. Worthington: 1884–1888
- John B. Hoge: 1888–1891
- Charles Cleaves Cole: 1891–1893
- Arthur A. Birney: 1893–1897
- Henry E. Davis: 1897–1899
- Thomas H. Anderson: 1899–1901
- Ashley M. Gould: 1901–1903
- Morgan H. Beach: 1903–1905
- Daniel W. Baker: 1905–1910
- Clarence R. Wilson: 1910–1914
- John E. Laskey: 1914–1921
- Peyton Gordon: 1921–1928
- Leo A. Rover: 1928–1934
- Leslie C. Garnett: 1934–1937
- David Andrew Pine: 1938–1940
- Edward Matthew Curran: 1940–1946
- George M. Fay: 1946
- George E. McNeil: 1946–1947
- George M. Fay: 1947–1951
- Charles M. Irelan:: 1951–1953
- Leo A. Rover: 1953–1956
- Oliver Gasch: 1956–1961
- David Campion Acheson: 1961–1965
- John C. Conliff Jr.: 1965
- David G. Bress: 1965–1969
- Thomas Aquinas Flannery: 1969–1971
- Harold H. Titus Jr.: 1971–1974
- Earl J. Silbert: 1974–1979
- Carl Raul: 1979
- Charles Ruff: 1979–1981
- Stanley S. Harris: 1982–1983
- Joseph diGenova: 1983–1988
- Timothy J. Reardon III (interim): 1988
- Jay B. Stephens: 1988–1993
- J. Ramsey Johnson (interim): 1993
- Eric Holder: 1993 – June 13, 1997
- Mary Lou Leary (interim): July 1997 – January 1998
- Wilma A. Lewis: January 1998 – April 2001
- Roscoe C. Howard: August 2001 – May 2004
- Kenneth L. Wainstein: May 2004 – September 28, 2006
- Jeffrey A. Taylor (interim): September 28, 2006 – May 28, 2009
- Channing D. Phillips (interim): May 28, 2009 – February 2010
- Ronald Machen: February 2010 – March 31, 2015
- Vincent Cohen Jr. (interim): April 1, 2015 – October 19, 2015
- Channing D. Phillips: October 19, 2015 – September 24, 2017
- Jessie Liu: September 24, 2017 – January 31, 2020
- Timothy Shea (interim) January 31, 2020 – May 19, 2020
- Michael R. Sherwin (interim) May 19, 2020 – March 3, 2021
- Channing D. Phillips (interim) March 3, 2021 – November 5, 2021
- Matthew M. Graves: November 5, 2021 – January 16, 2025
- Bridget M. Fitzpatrick (interim): January 16, 2025 – January 20, 2025
- Ed Martin (interim): January 20, 2025 – May 14, 2025
- Jeanine Pirro: May 14, 2025 – present

== Sources ==
- Bicentennial Celebration of the U.S. Attorneys, Executive Office for U.S. Attorneys. United States Department of Justice, 1989.
- United States Attorney for the District of Columbia
