= List of Cornell University alumni (education) =

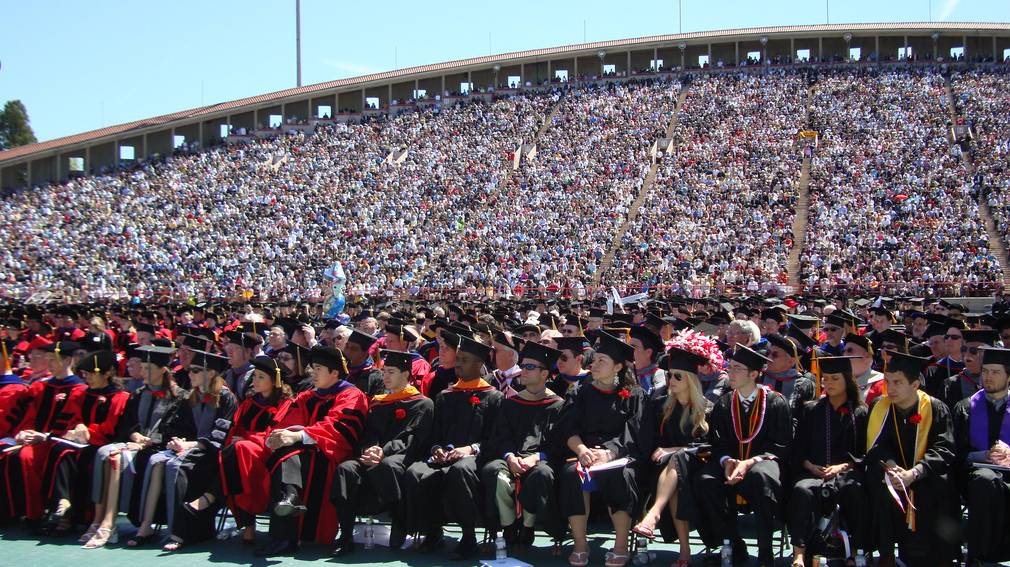
The 2008 graduation ceremony at Schoellkopf Field on the campus of Cornell University

This list of Cornell University alumni includes notable education graduates, non-graduate former students, and current students of Cornell University, an Ivy League university located in Ithaca, New York.

For other disciplines, see List of Cornell University alumni.

== Alumni ==
=== Founders and leaders of academic institutions ===
- John Cranford Adams (B.A. 1926, Ph.D. 1935) – 2nd president of Hofstra University (1944–1964)
- Ilesanmi Adesida (postdoctoral researcher 1979–1984) – dean of College of Engineering (2005–2012) and provost (2012–2015) at University of Illinois at Urbana–Champaign; member of National Academy of Engineering (2006) and the American Association for the Advancement of Science
- John Agresto (Ph.D. 1974) – president of St. John's College in Santa Fe (1989–2000)
- Joseph A. Alutto (Ph.D. 1968 organizational behavior) – dean of the SUNY Buffalo School of Management (1976–1990) and of Ohio State University's Max M. Fisher College of Business (1991–2007); executive vice president and provost of Ohio State University (2007–2013); interim president of Ohio State (2007, 2013–2014)
- Elam Jonathan Anderson (M.A. 1915) – president of Linfield College (1932–1938) and the University of Redlands (1938–1944)
- James A. Anderson (Ph.D. 1980) – chancellor and professor of psychology at Fayetteville State University (2008–)
- Alfred Atkinson (M.S. 1912) – 4th president of Montana State University (1919–1937) and 12th president of University of Arizona (1937–1947)
- Nadine Aubry (Ph.D. 1987 mechanical and aerospace engineering) – dean of the College of Engineering and University Distinguished Professor at Northeastern University; member of the National Academy of Engineering (2011)
- Joel D. Baines (Ph.D. 1988) – dean of Louisiana State University School of Veterinary Medicine (2014–)
- Michael Barber (Ph.D. 1972) – vice chancellor (CEO) of Flinders University, Australia (2008–2014)
- James Francis Barker (mechanical engineering graduate 1893) – 2nd president of Rochester Institute of Technology (1916–1919)
- William S. Barker (M.A. 1959) – church historian who served as president of Covenant Theological Seminary (1977–1984)
- George Wells Beadle (Ph.D. 1930 genetics) – president of University of Chicago, 1961–1968
- Steven D. Bennion (MPA) – president of Snow College (1982–1989), Brigham Young University–Idaho (then Ricks College) (1989–1997) and Southern Utah University (1997–2006)
- Sherwood Berg (M.A. 1948) – president of South Dakota State University (1975–1984)
- Katherine Bergeron (M.A., Ph.D.) – 11th president of Connecticut College (2014–) and former dean of the college at Brown University
- Ekanem Ikpi Braide (M.S., Ph.D., Parasitology) – founding vice chancellor of Federal University Lafia (2011–2016)
- Jamshed Bharucha (research associate 1982–1983) – 12th president of Cooper Union (2011–2015)
- Henry Bienen (B.S. 1960) – president of Northwestern University, 1995–2009
- Claude Bissell (Ph.D. English Literature) – president of Carleton University (1956–1958) and the University of Toronto (1958–1971); Companion of the Order of Canada
- William Fremont Blackman (Ph.D. 1893) – 4th president of Rollins College (1902–1915)
- Edward J. Bloustein (Ph.D. 1954, LL.B. 1959) – president of Bennington College (1965–1971) and Rutgers University (1971–1989)
- John C. Bliss (A.B. 1889) – president of what is now State University of New York at New Paltz (1908–1923)
- John G. Bollinger (M.S. 1958 mechanical engineering) – former dean (1981–1999) and dean emeritus of College of Engineering at the University of Wisconsin–Madison; member of the National Academy of Engineering (1983)
- Karen Boroff (B.S. ILR) – dean of Stillman School of Business, Seton Hall University
- Jonathan M. Brand (J.D. 1996) – president of Doane College (2005–2011) and of Cornell College (2011–)
- John Casper Branner (B.S. 1882) – president of Stanford University, (1913–15); geologist, member of the National Academy of Sciences (1905)
- Hilton Marshall Briggs (Ph.D.) – 13th president of South Dakota State University (1958–1975)
- Victor L. Butterfield (B.A. 1927, M.A. 1928) – 11th president of Wesleyan University (1943–1967)
- Colin G. Campbell (B.A.) – 13th president of Wesleyan University (1970–1988)
- Carlos Eugenio Chardón (B.A. 1919, M.S. 1921) – chancellor of the University of Puerto Rico (1931–1935)
- J. Richard Chase (Ph.D.) – president of Biola University (1970–1982) and Wheaton College (Illinois) (1982–1993)
- Amrik Singh Cheema (Ph.D. Agriculture Extension) – vice chancellor of the Punjab Agricultural University (1976–1981)
- Stanley Chodorow (B.A. 1964 government, Ph.D. 1968 history) – provost of the University of Pennsylvania (1994–1997) and Dean of Arts and Humanities at the University of California, San Diego
- Marc P. Christensen (B.S. 1993 engineering physics) – dean of Lyle School of Engineering at Southern Methodist University
- Lisa Staiano-Coico, aka Lisa S. Coico (Ph.D. 1981 Weill Cornell Graduate School of Medical Sciences) – dean of New York State College of Human Ecology (2004–2007); provost of Temple University (2007–2010); president of City College of New York (2010–2016)
- Elizabeth Coleman (M.A.) – president of Bennington College (1987–2013)
- Stirling Colgate (B.S. 1948, Ph.D. 1951) – president of New Mexico Institute of Mining and Technology (1965–1974) and co-founder of Santa Fe Institute; member of the National Academy of Sciences
- Theodore B. Comstock (B.S. 1870, D.Sc. 1886) – first president of the University of Arizona (1894–1895)
- Roger B. Corbett (B.S., M.S., Ph.D.) – president of New Mexico State University (1955–1970)
- Edmund Cranch (B.A. 1945. Ph.D. 1951) – dean of Cornell University College of Engineering (1972–1978), president of Worcester Polytechnic Institute (1978–1985)
- Steven C. Currall (Ph.D. 1990 organizational behavior) – president of the University of South Florida (2019−), provost and vice president for academic affairs at Southern Methodist University (2016–2019) and former dean of the Graduate School of Management at UC Davis (2009–2014); Fellow of the American Association for the Advancement of Science
- Paul D'Anieri (M.A., Ph.D. 1991) – dean of University of Florida College of Liberal Arts and Sciences (2008–2014); executive vice president and provost of University of California, Riverside (2014–)
- Thomas B. Day (Ph.D. 1957 physics) – 6th president of San Diego State University (1978–1996)
- William W. Destler (Ph.D. 1972 applied physics) – president of Rochester Institute of Technology (2007–2017)
- Cathy Dove (MBA) – former vice president of Cornell Tech; 10th president of Paul Smith's College 2014–present
- Faye Duchin (B.A. 1965 experimental psychology) – dean of the School of Humanities and Social Sciences at Rensselaer Polytechnic Institute (1996–2002)
- Hu Dunfu (B.A. 1909 mathematics) – Chinese mathematician who co-founded the Chinese Mathematical Society and served as its first president; He co-founded Utopia University in March 1912, which became one of the most reputable private universities in China, and served as its president for 20 years (1912–1928, 1941–1945)
- Clyde A. Duniway (A.B. 1892) – president of the University of Montana (1908–1912), the University of Wyoming (1913–1917) and Colorado College (1917–1924)
- Edward D. Eddy (B.A. 1944, Ph.D. 1956) – provost of the University of New Hampshire (1955–1960) and Pennsylvania State University (1977–1983); president of Chatham University (1960–1977) and University of Rhode Island (1983–1991)
- Henry Turner Eddy (Ph.D. 1872) – president of the University of Cincinnati (1874–1875, 1884, 1889–1891)
- Roger O. Egeberg (B.A. 1925) – dean of the University of Southern California School of Medicine, assistant secretary of Health and Scientific Affairs in the Department of Health, Education, and Welfare
- Kristin Esterberg (M.A. 1988, Ph.D. 1991 sociology) – provost and academic vice president at Salem State University (2009–2014); president of the State University of New York at Potsdam (2014–)
- Gregory L. Fenves (B.S. 1979) – dean of the Cockrell School of Engineering (2008–2013), executive vice president and provost (2013–2015) and the 29th president of the University of Texas at Austin (2015–2020), 21st president of Emory University (2020–); member of National Academy of Engineering (2014)
- Glenn W. Ferguson (B.A. Economics 1950, MBA 1951) – chancellor of Long Island University (1969–1970), president of Clark University (1970–1973), the University of Connecticut (1973–1978), the American University of Paris (1992–1995) and Lincoln Center for the Performing Arts in New York City (1983), U.S. diplomat
- Daniel Fischel (B.A. 1972) – former dean of the University of Chicago Law School (1999–2001) and Lee and Brena Freeman Professor of Law and Business, emeritus at the University of Chicago
- Daniel Mark Fogel (B.A. 1969 English, M.F.A. 1974 creative writing, Ph.D. 1976 English) – president of the University of Vermont (2002–2011)
- George K. Fraenkel (Ph.D. 1949) – physical chemist, chairman of the chemistry department (1965–1968) and Dean of Graduate School of Arts and Sciences (1968–1983) at Columbia University
- Sharon Gaber (Ph.D.) – provost of the University of Arkansas (2009–2015), president of the University of Toledo (2015–)
- Zvi Galil (Ph.D. 1975) – president of Tel Aviv University (2007–2009); dean of the Fu Foundation School of Engineering & Applied Science at Columbia University (1995–2007) and of Georgia Tech's College of Computing since April 9, 2010; member of the National Academy of Engineering (2004), fellow of the American Academy of Arts and Sciences (2005) and of the ACM (1995)
- Maria Gallo (B.S. Agronomy) – 13th president of Delaware Valley University (2016–)
- James C. Garland (Ph.D. 1968 physics) – 20th president of Miami University (1996–2006)
- Charles Garside (Law School graduate, 1923) – former president of the State University of New York (1951–1952)
- John W. Gilmore (B.S. 1898, MSA 1906) – president of the University of Hawaii, 1908–1913
- Milton Glick (postdoctoral fellow 1965–1967) – president of the University of Nevada, Reno (2006–2011)
- Joseph Glover (B.A. 1974 mathematics) – provost of the University of Florida 2008–present
- Jeffrey P. Gold (B.S.E 1974, M.D. 1978) – chancellor of the University of Nebraska Medical Center (2014–) and the University of Toledo Health Sciences Campus (2010–2014)
- Richard Alton Graham (B.S. 1942 mechanical engineering) – president of Goddard College in Plainfield, Vermont (1975–1976); equal rights leader who served as founding commissioner of the United States Equal Employment Opportunity Commission (1965–1966)
- John C. Green (Ph.D. 1983) – dean of the Buchtel College of Arts and Sciences (2017–) and interim president (2018–) at the University of Akron
- Wang Guosong (M.S. 1931, Ph.D. 1933) – co-founder of the Chinese Society for Electrical Engineering in 1934; head of the electrical engineering of Zhejiang University, vice president (1950–1951, 1952–1957) and acting president (1951–1952) of Zhejiang University
- Carl A. Hanson (Ph.D. 1948 ILR) – president of the Gettysburg College (1961–1977)
- Zhang Hanying (M.S. 1925) – president of what is now Tianjin University (1948–1949)
- Fred Harvey Harrington (B.A. 1933) – president of the University of Wisconsin–Madison (1962–1970)
- Franklin S. Harris (Ph.D.) – president of Brigham Young University (1921–1945) and Utah State University (1945–1950)
- William Williams Henderson (M.A. 1905) – president of what is now Weber State University (1910–1914)
- Albert Ross Hill (Ph.D. 1896 philosophy) – president of the University of Missouri (1908–1921)
- Carl McClellan Hill (M.S., Ph.D.) – president of Kentucky State University (1962–1975) and Hampton University (1976–1978)
- Linnaeus N. Hines (attended Graduate School, 1899) – president of Indiana State University (1921–1934) and Ball State University (1921–1924)
- Jerome H. Holland (B.S. 1939, M.S. 1941) – president of Delaware State University (1953–60) and Hampton University (1960–70); U.S. diplomat
- Julia Irvine – 4th president of Wellesley College (1894–1899)
- Leslie Jacobs (B.A. 1981) – founder of Educate Now, Louisiana Board of Elementary and Secondary Education; instrumental in transforming the moribund Orleans Parish School System after Hurricane Katrina
- Emil Q. Javier (Ph.D. 1969) – president of the University of the Philippines, 1993–99
- Walter H. Johns (Ph.D. 1934 classics and ancient history) – president of the University of Alberta, 1959–1969; Officer of the Order of Canada
- David Starr Jordan (M.S. 1872, honorary LL.D. 1886) – founding president of Stanford University (1891–1913), president of Indiana University (1885–91), Smithsonian Institution associate
- Horace A. Judson (Ph.D.) – president of the State University of New York at Plattsburgh (1994–2003), Grambling State University, Louisiana (2004–2009) and Knoxville College (2010–2013)
- Charnvit Kasetsiri (Ph.D. 1972) – president of Thammasat University, 1994–95
- Dexter Keezer (M.A. 1923) – president of Reed College (1934–1942)
- William Jasper Kerr – president of Utah State University (1900–1907) and Oregon State University (1907–1932)
- Rakesh Khurana (B.S. 1990) – dean of Harvard College (2014–)
- Akhlaqur Rahman Kidwai (Ph.D. 1950) – chancellor of Aligarh Muslim University, Aligarh (1983–1992)
- Lawrence A. Kimpton (Ph.D. 1935 philosophy) – president of University of Chicago, 1951–1960
- John E. King (Ph.D. 1941) – provost of the University of Minnesota Duluth, president of what is now Emporia State University (1953–1966) and the University of Wyoming (1966–1967)
- P.C. King (1913) – president of what is now China Agricultural University (1917–1920) and Tsinghua University (1920–1922)
- Joseph T. Kingsbury – president of the University of Utah (1892–1894, 1897–1916)
- Steven Knapp (M.S. 1977, Ph.D. 1981) – provost of Johns Hopkins University (1996–2007); president of The George Washington University (2007–2017)
- Warren Powers Laird (architecture 1985–1987) – founding dean of the school of fine arts at the University of Pennsylvania (1920–1932)
- Frank Lazarus (M.A. 1968, Ph.D. 1972) – president of the University of Dallas (2004–2009)
- Patrick F. Leahy (Master's in Business Administration and Labor Relations) – 6th president of Wilkes University (2012–) and president-elect of Monmouth University
- Robert C. T. Lee (Ph.D. Veterinary Medicine) – president of National Chung Hsing University (1981–1984)
- Jeffrey S. Lehman (A.B. 1977) – president of Cornell University, 2003–2005; dean of the University of Michigan Law School, 1994–2003; Founding Vice Chancellor and CEO of NYU Shanghai, 2012–present
- Charles A. LeMaistre (M.D. 1947) – chancellor of the University of Texas System (1971–1978), president of the University of Texas MD Anderson Cancer Center (1978–1996)
- E.L.Li (Ph.D. 1941) – civil engineer and educator; former vice-president of Zhejiang University and former president of the Zhejiang University of Technology
- Shu-tian Li (Ph.D. 1928) – studied hydraulic issues in China; grandfather of Steven Chu; president of what is now Southwest Jiaotong University (1930–1932) and of what is now Tianjin University (1932–1939)
- Wendy B. Libby (B.A. 1972, MBA 1977) – president of Stephens College (2003–2009) and Stetson University (2009–)
- Winthrop C. Libby – president of the University of Maine, 1969–1973
- Jay O. Light (B.S.E. 1963) – dean of Harvard Business School, 2006–2010
- Franklin M. Loew (B.S., V.M.D.) – dean of the Tufts University School of Veterinary Medicine (1982–1995) and of the Cornell University College of Veterinary Medicine (1995–1997); president of Becker College (1998–2003)
- Wallace Loh (M.A.) – president of the University of Maryland, 2010–present
- Richard P. Longaker (Ph.D.) – provost and vice president of academic affairs of Johns Hopkins University (1976–1986)
- Katharine Culbert Lyall (B.A. 1963, Ph.D. 1969) – president of the University of Wisconsin System (1992–2004)
- Louis L. Madsen (Ph.D. 1934) – president of Utah State University (1950–1953)
- C. Peter Magrath (Ph.D.) – president of Binghamton University (1972–1974, 2010–2012); president of the University of Minnesota (1974–1984); president of the University of Missouri System (1985–1991); president of West Virginia University (2008–2010)
- Tomas Mapua (B.Arch. 1911) – founder of the Mapúa Institute of Technology and architect
- Robert Marshak (Ph.D.1939) – president of City College of New York (1970–1979); fourteen-year chairmanship of physics department at University of Rochester
- Dale Rogers Marshall (B.A. 1959 government) – 6th president of Wheaton College (Massachusetts) (1992–2004)
- Burton Clare Matthews (Ph.D. 1952) – president of the University of Waterloo (1970–1981) and the University of Guelph (1983–1988), chairman of the Ontario Council of University Affairs (1982–1984)
- Stuart McCutcheon (postdoctoral fellow 1982–1984) – vice-chancellor of Victoria University of Wellington (2001–2004) and of the University of Auckland (2005–)
- Michael C. McFarland (B.A. 1969 physics) – president of College of the Holy Cross (2000–2012)
- Alexander Meiklejohn (Ph.D. 1897) – president of Amherst College (1912–1924); dean of Brown University (1901–1912)
- Thomas Noel Mitchell (Ph.D.) – provost (president) of Trinity College Dublin (1991–2001)
- Fred Tom Mitchell (Ph.D.) – president of Mississippi State University (1945–1953)
- Mary Molloy (Ph.D. 1907) – president of the College of Saint Teresa (1928–1946)
- Carlo Montemagno (B.S. 1980 agricultural and biological engineering) – chancellor of Southern Illinois University Carbondale (2017–2018)
- Don Moon (B.S. 1957) – president of Shimer College, 1978–2004
- Harcourt A. Morgan – 13th president of the University of Tennessee (1919–1934)
- Steven Muller (Ph.D. 1958 political science) – president of Johns Hopkins University, 1972 to 1990
- Keith Murray (Ph.D.) – rector of Lincoln College, Oxford (1944–1953) and chancellor of University of Southampton (1964–1974)
- Priscilla Nelson (Ph.D. 1983 geotechnical engineering) – provost and senior vice president for academic affairs at the New Jersey Institute of Technology (2005–2008); department head and professor of mining engineering at the Colorado School of Mines (2014–)
- Claudia Neuhauser (Ph.D. 1990 mathematics) – vice chancellor for academic affairs at the University of Minnesota Rochester (2008–2013); fellow of the American Association for the Advancement of Science (2011)
- Ernest Fox Nichols (M.S. 1893, Ph.D. 1897) – president of MIT (1921–22) and Dartmouth (1909–16), professor of physics at Colgate (1892–98), Dartmouth (1898–1903), Columbia (1903–09), and Yale; recipient of Rumford Prize for his proof that light exerts pressure using Nichols radiometer, member of the National Academy of Sciences (1908)
- S. Georgia Nugent (Ph.D.) – 18th president of Kenyon College (2003–2013); interim president of the College of Wooster (2015–2016)
- Lynn Okagaki (Ph.D. developmental psychology) – former commissioner of Education Research in the Institute of Education Sciences at the U.S. Department of Education; dean of the College of Education and Human Development and deputy provost for academic affairs at the University of Delaware
- Archie Palmer (A.B. 1920) – 8th president of the University of Tennessee at Chattanooga (1938–1942)
- Marc Brendan Parlange (M.S. 1987 agricultural engineering, Ph.D. 1990 civil and environmental engineering) – 12th president of the University of Rhode Island (2021–); dean of faculty of applied science, University of British Columbia, provost and senior vice-president at Monash University (2017–); member of the National Academy of Engineering (2017)
- Frederick D. Patterson (Ph.D. 1933) – president of what is now Tuskegee University (1935–53); founder of the United Negro College Fund; 1987 Presidential Medal of Freedom recipient
- Raymond A. Pearson (B.S. 1894, M.S. 1899) – president of Iowa State University (1912–1926) and the University of Maryland, College Park (1926–1935)
- Eduardo Peñalver (B.A. 1994) – 16th Dean of Cornell Law School (2014–2021), president of Seattle University (July 1, 2021–March 31, 2026), 49th president of Georgetown University (July 1, 2026–)
- Joseph B. Platt (Ph.D. 1942) – founding president of Harvey Mudd College (1956–1976); 8th president of Claremont Graduate University (1976–1981)
- Jennifer Raab (class of 1977) – president of Hunter College (2001–)
- Richard M. Ramin (B.A. 1951) – vice president for Public Affairs at Cornell University
- Charles H. Rammelkamp (B.A. 1896, Ph.D. 1900) – president of Illinois College (1905–1932)
- Wendy Raymond (A.B. 1982 chemistry) – 16th president of Haverford College (2019–); vice president for academic affairs and dean of faculty at Davidson College (2013–2019)
- George Rea (1915) – president of what is now Drexel University (1942–1944)
- Hermengildo B. Reyes (B.Eng. 1918) – co-founder and president of Far Eastern University (1946–1947) and of University of the East (1951)
- Melody Rose (M.A., Ph.D.) – 15th president of Marylhurst University (2014–present); former chancellor of the Oregon University System (OUS)
- Brian C. Rosenberg (B.A.) – 16th president of the Macalester College (2003–)
- John R. Rosenberg (M.A. 1984, Ph.D. 1985) – dean of the College of Humanities (2005–2015) and Washington Irving Professor of Spanish and American Relations at Brigham Young University
- Neil Albert Salonen (attended, transferred) – president of the University of Bridgeport (2000–)
- Eugene G. Sander (M.S. 1959, Ph.D. 1965 biology) – president of the University of Arizona (2011–2012)
- Carlos E. Santiago (Ph.D. 1982 economics) – chancellor, University of Wisconsin–Milwaukee
- Charles Madison Sarratt (bachelor's 1911) – chair of the department of mathematics (1924–1946), dean of students (1939–1945) and vice-chancellor (1946–1958) at Vanderbilt University
- Earl Rogers Sayers (M.A. 1961, Ph.D. 1964) – president of the University of Alabama (1988–1996)
- George L. Scherger (Ph.D. 1899) – 3rd president of Columbia College Chicago (1927–1929)
- Robert A. Scott (Ph.D.) – former president of Ramapo College (1985–2000); 9th president of Adelphi University (2000–2015)
- Werner Seligmann (B.Arch. 1955) – dean and professor of architecture at Syracuse University (1976–1990)
- Mary Antoinette Brown Sherman (Ph.D. 1967) – first woman to serve as president of the University of Liberia (1978–1984)
- Hu Shih (B.A. 1914) – chancellor of Peking University (1946–1948)
- Michael Sipser (B.A. 1974 mathematics) – Donner Professor of Mathematics and dean of science at Massachusetts Institute of Technology; Fellow of the American Academy of Arts and Sciences, the American Mathematical Society and the Association for Computing Machinery
- Arthur K. Smith (Ph.D. 1970) – president of the University of Utah (1991–1997) and the University of Houston (1997–2003); chancellor of the University of Houston System (1997–2003); provost/executive vice president/interim president of the University of South Carolina (1988–1991); vice president for administration at the Binghamton University
- Robert L. Sproull (B.A. 1940 English, Ph.D. 1943 physics) – president and CEO of University of Rochester (1975–1984)
- Harvey G. Stenger (B.S. 1979 chemical engineering) – 7th president of Binghamton University (2012–)
- Bertha Stoneman (bachelor's, Ph.D.) – botanist and university professor in South Africa; 3rd president of Huguenot College (1921–1933)
- Kathleen Sullivan (B.A. 1976) – professor of law at Harvard Law School (1984–93), dean (1999–2004) and professor (1993–2012) of Stanford Law School
- Louis Wade Sullivan (Medical College Resident) – founder, dean (1975–1981) and president (1981–1989, 1993–2002) of Morehouse School of Medicine; Secretary of Health and Human Services under George H. W. Bush (1989–1993)
- Raghu Sundaram (Ph.D. 1988 economics) – dean of the New York University Stern School of Business (2018–)
- Phebe Temperance Sutliff (A.M. 1890) – president, Rockford College
- Samuel O. Thier – president of Brandeis University (1991–1994), of Massachusetts General Hospital (1994–1996) and of the Institute of Medicine (1985–1991); CEO of Massachusetts General Hospital (1996–2002); Fellow of the American Academy of Arts and Sciences
- M. Carey Thomas (B.A. 1877) – founder and second president of Bryn Mawr College (1894–1922); suffragist
- George R. Throop (Ph.D. 1905) – chancellor of Washington University in St. Louis (1927–1944)
- Adrian Tinsley (Ph.D. 1969 English literature) – president of Bridgewater State University (1989–2002)
- Martha Van Rensselaer (1909) – co-founder of Cornell's College of Home Economics, which later became the College of Human Ecology
- Suzanne Elise Walsh (B.S.W.) – 19th president of Bennett College (2019–)
- W. Clarke Wescoe (M.D. 1944) – dean of the University of Kansas School of Medicine (1952–1960) and 10th Chancellor of the University of Kansas (1960–1969)
- Joan Wexler (born 1946) – dean and president of Brooklyn Law School
- Warren Elvin Wilson (M.C.E.) – president of South Dakota School of Mines and Technology (1948–1953)
- Crystal Williams (MFA) – 18th president of the Rhode Island School of Design (2022–)
- Kenneth E. Wing (B.A., M.A., Ph.D.) – former president of the State University of New York at Cobleskill (1992–2002)
- Lynton Wilson (M.A. Economics) – chancellor of McMaster University (2007–2013)
- George T. Winston (B.A. 1874 literature, professor) – president of University of North Carolina (1891–1896), the University of Texas at Austin (1896–1899), and North Carolina State University (1899–1908)
- Randy Woodson (M.S. and Ph.D. Horticulture) – former provost of Purdue University; 14th Chancellor of North Carolina State University (2010–)
- Carl R. Woodward (Ph.D. 1926) – president of the University of Rhode Island (1941–1958)
- Gregory S. Woodward (Ph.D. Doctor of Musical Arts) – 22nd president of Carthage College (2012–2017) and 6th president of the University of Hartford (2017–)
- Harry Woolf (Ph.D. 1955) – provost of Johns Hopkins University (1972–1976), fifth director of Institute for Advanced Study (1976–1987)
- Henry T. Yang (Ph.D.) – president of University of California, Santa Barbara (1994–); member of the National Academy of Engineering (1991)
- Mao Yisheng (M.S. 1917) – former president of Southwest Jiaotong University, Tianjin University etc.; structural engineer, member of the National Academy of Engineering (1982)
- J. Meejin Yoon (B.Arch. 1995) – professor (2001–2018) and department head (2014–2018) of the department of architecture at MIT School of Architecture and Planning, first female dean-elect of College of Architecture, Art and Planning at Cornell University (07/2018)
- E.T. York (Ph.D. 1955) – president of the University of Florida (1973–1974); chancellor of the State University System of Florida (1974–1980)
- H. C. Zen (B.S. 1916) – Chinese politician, academic who served as president of National Sichuan University (1935–1937)
- George F. Zook (Ph.D. 1913 European history) – 9th president of the University of Akron (1925–1933); United States Commissioner of Education (1933–1934) and president of the American Council on Education (1934–1950)

=== Educators and scholars ===
- Rawi Abdelal (M.A. 1997, Ph.D. 1999 government) – Joseph C. Wilson Professor of Business Administration at Harvard Business School
- Amanda Anderson (Ph.D.) – Andrew W. Mellon Professor for the Humanities at Brown University, former faculty member at the University of Illinois at Urbana–Champaign and Caroline Donovan Professor of English Literature and the head of the English department at Johns Hopkins University; Guggenheim Fellows (2009)
- Paul Avrich (B.A. 1957) – professor and historian; taught at Queens College, City University of New York for most of his life
- William Bagley (Ph.D. 1900 psychology and education) – educator and editor
- Jacques Bailly (Ph.D. 1997 classics and philosophy) – winner of Scripps National Spelling Bee (1980) and the Bee's chief pronouncer (2003–); recipient of the Fulbright Scholarship (1988–1990) and associate professor of classics at the University of Vermont (2004–)
- Brian A. Barsky (M.S. Computer Science) – professor of computer science and vision science at the University of California, Berkeley
- Shlomo Benartzi (Ph.D. 1994) – behavioral economist at the UCLA Anderson School of Management in Los Angeles, California
- Lauren Berlant (Ph.D. 1985) – George M. Pullman Distinguished Service Professor of English at the University of Chicago
- Laurie Brown (Ph.D. 1951) – theoretical physicist and historian of quantum field theory and elementary particle physics at Northwestern University
- Lawrence Buell (Ph.D.) – Powell M. Cabot Professor of American Literature emeritus at Harvard University
- Millar Burrows (class of 1912) – biblical scholar; professor, and later department chairman of Biblical literature and history of religions at Brown University (1925–1934); Winkley Professor of Biblical theology at Yale Divinity School (1934–1950) and chairman of near eastern languages and literatures at Yale Graduate School (1950–1958)
- Hannah Buxbaum (J.D. 1992) – John E. Schiller Chair in Legal Ethics at Indiana University Maurer School of Law
- Yuen Ren Chao (B.A. 1914) – Chinese-American linguist, educator, scholar, poet, and composer; president of Linguistic Society of America (1945)
- Gregory Chow (B.A. 1951) – Chinese American economist, Class of 1913 professor of Political Economy at Princeton University, known for Chow test
- Paul A. Cohen (attended 1952–1953, transferred) – Edith Stix Wasserman Professor of Asian Studies and History emeritus at Wellesley College
- Kimberlé Williams Crenshaw (B.A. 1981) – professor of law at Columbia Law School and UCLA Law School and Centennial Professor at the London School of Economics; critical race scholar, civil rights advocate, introduced and developed intersectional theory
- Shai Davidai, Israeli assistant professor at Columbia Business School, advocate against antisemitism
- Alan Deardorff (M.A. 1969, Ph.D. 1971 economics) – John W. Sweetland Professor of International Economics and Professor of Economics and Public Policy at the University of Michigan
- Mary Ann Doane (B.A. 1979 English) – Class of 1937 Professor of Film and Media at the University of California, Berkeley and former George Hazard Crooker Professor of Modern Culture and Media at Brown University
- Theodore Drange (Ph.D. 1963) – philosopher of religion and professor emeritus at West Virginia University
- Cliff Eisen – professor of music at King's College London (1997–)
- Herman LeRoy Fairchild (B.S. 1874) – co-founder of Geological Society of America (GSA), secretary (1891–1906) and president (1912) of GSA
- Joel S. Fetzer (B.A. 1988) – distinguished professor of political science at Pepperdine University
- Jill Fisch (B.A. 1982) – professor at the University of Pennsylvania Law School
- Marc A. Franklin (LL.B. 1956) – Frederick I. Richman Professor of Law at Stanford Law School
- Guillermo Gallego (
- Sandra Gilbert (B.A. 1957) – professor emerita of English at the University of California, Davis
- Martin D. Ginsburg (A.B. 1953) – former professor of law at Georgetown University Law Center in Washington, D.C. (M.S. 1987) - Liu Family Emeritus Professor at Columbia University
- Michael Goldsmith (B.S. 1972, J.D. 1975) – Woodruff J. Deem Professor of Law at Brigham Young University's J. Reuben Clark Law School.
- Paul S. Goodman (Ph.D. 1966 organizational psychology) – Organizational psychologist, author, filmmaker, and the Richard M. Cyert Professor of Organizational Psychology at Carnegie Mellon University
- Rema Hanna (B.S. 1999 policy analysis) – Jeffrey Cheah Professor of South East Asia Studies at Harvard University
- John Fillmore Hayford (1889) – geodesist; the crater Hayford on the far side of the Moon and Mount Hayford, a 1,871 m mountain peak near Metlakatla, Alaska, United States, are named after him; member of the National Academy of Sciences (1911)
- Steven Handel (M.S. 1974 and Ph.D. 1976 ecology and evolutionary biology) – distinguished professor of ecology at Rutgers University
- Hollis Dow Hedberg (M.S. 1926 geology) – geologist specializing in petroleum exploration, professor of geology at Princeton University (1959–1971); recipient of Wollaston Medal (1975) and Penrose Medal (1980), member of the National Academy of Sciences (1960)
- Ernest L. Hettich (1919) – scholar of classics
- Paul Horwich (Ph.D. 1974) – professor of philosophy at New York University, best known for his work Truth (1990); on faculties of the Massachusetts Institute of Technology (1973–1995), University College London (1995–2000), and the Graduate Center of the City University of New York (2000–2005)
- Jane Humphries (Ph.D. 1973) – professor of economic history and Fellow of All Souls College at the University of Oxford
- Bruce Jentleson (B.A. 1973, Ph.D. 1983) – professor of public policy and political science at Duke University
- Lilian Wyckoff Johnson (Ph.D., 1902) – professor of history at the University of Tennessee; president of the Western College for Women (1904–1906)
- Kevin Lane Keller (A.B. 1978 economics and mathematics) – E. B. Osborn Professor of Marketing at the Tuck School of Business at Dartmouth College
- Steven Klepper (B.A. 1970, M.A. 1972, Ph.D. 1975 economics) – Arthur Arton Hamerschlag Professor of Economics and Social Science at Carnegie Mellon University
- Justin Kruger (Ph.D. 1999 social psychology) – social psychologist and professor at New York University Stern School of Business
- Cornelius C. (Neil) Kubler (B.A. 1972; M.A. 1975; Ph.D. 1981) – principal, American Institute in Taiwan Chinese Language & Area Studies School, Taipei (1981–87), language training supervisor (1987–88) and chair of the Dept. of Asian & African Languages, Foreign Service Institute, United States Department of State (1988–91); chair of the Department of Asian Studies, Williams College and former American co-director of the Hopkins–Nanjing Center
- Robert Kurzban (B.A. 1991 psychology) – professor of psychology at the University of Pennsylvania
- Jeffrey R. Long (B.A. 1991) – professor of chemistry and of chemical and biomolecular engineering at the University of California, Berkeley, member of the American Academy of Arts and Sciences (2019)
- Mary Ting Yi Lui (M.A. 1995, Ph.D. 2000) – professor of history and American studies at Yale University
- Joseph Margulies (B.A. 1982) – professor of law and government at Cornell University (2015–)
- Emil Martinec (Ph.D. 1984) – professor at the Enrico Fermi Institute at the University of Chicago; specialist in string theory
- Clifford F. Mass (B.S. 1974 physics) – professor of atmospheric sciences at the University of Washington
- Edwin Mims (Ph.D. 1990) – professor of English literature who served as the chair of the English Department from 1912 to 1942 at Vanderbilt University
- Asoke Nath Mitra (Ph.D. 1955) – Indian physicist at Delhi University; received the Shanti Swarup Bhatnagar Prize in 1969
- David S. Moore (Ph.D.) – Shanti S. Gupta Distinguished Professor of Statistics, emeritus at Purdue University known for his leadership in statistics education; president of the American Statistical Association (1998)
- David A. Moss (B.A.) – John G. McLean Professor of Business Administration at Harvard University
- Daniel L. Nagin (B.A.) – clinical professor of law and the vice dean for experiential and clinical education at the Harvard Law School
- Paul M. O'Leary (Ph.D. 1929, faculty 1924–1967) – economist and educator; the first dean of the S.C. Johnson Graduate School of Management
- Julie O'Sullivan (J.D. 1984) – professor of law at Georgetown University Law Center
- Leonard Radinsky (B.A. 1958) – professor (1967–1985), chairman of the department of anatomy (1978–1983) at the University of Chicago
- John W. Reed (LL.B. 1942) – Thomas M. Cooley Professor of Law at the University of Michigan Law School
- Susan Mokotoff Reverby (B.S. 1967 labor history) – Marion Butler McLean Professor in the History of Ideas and Professor of Women's and Gender Studies at Wellesley College; known for uncovering the syphilis experiments in Guatemala
- Michelle Rhee (B.S. 1992 government) – founder and president of The New Teacher Project; appointed superintendent of Washington, DC Public Schools in 2007
- Gretchen Ritter (B.A. 1983) – dean of the Cornell University College of Arts and Sciences
- John Rodgers (B.A. 1936, M.S. 1937) – Silliman Professor of Geology emeritus at Yale University; member of the National Academy of Sciences (1969), fellow of the American Association for the Advancement of Science
- Dennis A. Rondinelli, Ph.D. 1969 – professor and researcher of public administration at the Sanford School of Public Policy
- Serge Rudaz (Ph.D. 1979) – theoretical physicist, professor of physics and director of undergraduate honors at the University of Minnesota; Fellow of the American Physical Society, recipient of the Canadian Association of Physicists Herzberg Medal
- Eve Kosofsky Sedgwick (class of 1971) – academic scholar in the fields of gender studies, queer theory (queer studies), and critical theory
- Sydney Shoemaker (Ph.D. 1958) – Susan Linn Sage Professor Emeritus of Philosophy at Cornell University
- Daniel Simons (Ph.D. 1997) – professor of psychology at the University of Illinois, known for "Gorillas in Our Midst"; Ig Nobel Prize winner (2004) for "demonstrating that even gorillas can become invisible when people are attending to something else"
- Elaine Sisman (B.A. 1972) – Anne Parsons Bender Professor of Music who served as department chair from 1999 to 2005 at Columbia University, president of the American Musicological Society (2005–2006); member of the American Academy of Arts and Sciences (2014)
- G. William Skinner (B.A. 1947, Ph.D. 1954) − anthropologist and scholar of China at Columbia University (1958−1960), Cornell University (1960−1965), Stanford University (1965−1989), University of California, Davis (1990–2005); member of the National Academy of Sciences (1980) and president of Association for Asian Studies (1983−1984)
- Eleonore Stump (M.A. 1973, Ph.D. 1975) – Robert J. Henle Professor of Philosophy at Saint Louis University; member of the American Academy of Arts and Sciences (2012)
- Sridhar Tayur (Ph.D. 1990 operations research and industrial engineering) – Ford Distinguished Research Chair Professor of Operations Management at Carnegie Mellon University; member of the National Academy of Engineering (2017)
- George B. Thomas (Ph.D. 1940) – professor of mathematics at MIT for 38 years, known for being the author of the widely used calculus textbook Calculus and Analytic Geometry
- Barry Voight – professor emeritus of geology and geological engineering at Pennsylvania State University; member of the National Academy of Engineering (2017)
- Michael Wachter (B.S. 1964) – professor at the University of Pennsylvania Law School
- Michael S. Wald (B.A. 1963) – professor (1967–2005), Jackson Eli Reynolds Professor of Law, emeritus (2005–) at Stanford Law School
- Huang Wanli (M.S. 1935 hydrology) – Chinese hydrologist and professor at Tsinghua University (1953–2001)
- Richard H. Weisberg (Ph.D. 1970) – Walter Floersheimer Professor of Constitutional Law at Cardozo School of Law, founding director at Cardozo of the Holocaust, Genocide and Human Rights Program and the Floersheimer Center for Constitutional Democracy, and a recipient of France's Legion of Honour (2008)
- Eric W. Weisstein (B.A. 1990 physics, minor astronomy) – encyclopedist, created and maintains MathWorld, ScienceWorld, and other encyclopedias
- John W. Wells (Ph.D. 1933, professor 1948–1973) – paleontologist, biologist and geologist; president of Paleontological Society (1961–1962), member of the National Academy of Sciences (1968)
- Robert C. West (B.A. 1950) – E. G. Rochow Professor of Chemistry Emeritus at the University of Wisconsin–Madison; Fellow of the American Association for the Advancement of Science (1978)
- David White (1886) – geologist; served as president of the Geological Society of America in 1923; recipient of the Thompson Medal (1931) and the Walcott Medal (1934); Fellow of the American Academy of Arts and Sciences (1921); member of the National Academy of Sciences (1912)
- Eliot Wigginton (B.A. 1965) – high school teacher; founder and editor of the Foxfire books; MacArthur Fellow (1989)
- Stephen Yale-Loehr (B.A. 1977, J.D. 1981) – professor of immigration law practice at Cornell Law School (1991–)
- Raymond W. Yeung (B.A. 1984, MEng 1985, PhD 1988) – professor of information engineering at Chinese University of Hong Kong
- E-An Zen (B.A. 1951) – geologist; Roebling Medal recipient, fellow of the Geological Society of America (president, 1991–1992); the American Association for the Advancement of Science (AAAS), the American Academy of Arts and Sciences and the Mineralogical Society of America, member of the Geological Society of Washington (president 1973) and the National Academy of Sciences
- Qing Zhao (Ph.D. 2001 electrical engineering) – professor of electrical and computer engineering at Cornell University, fellow of Institute of Electrical and Electronics Engineers (IEEE) (2013)

== See also ==
- List of Cornell University faculty
- List of Nobel laureates by university affiliation
- List of Quill and Dagger members
- Notable alumni of the Sphinx Head Society
