= John Rosenberg =

John Rosenberg may refer to:

- John Rosenberg (academic) (born 1953), Australian academic and information technology professional
- John Rosenberg (American football), American football coach and graduate of Harvard University
- John R. Rosenberg (born 1956), American academic
- John M. Rosenberg (born 1931), Holocaust survivor and civil and human rights activist
