= Roger Corbett (disambiguation) =

Roger Corbett is an Australian businessman.

Roger Corbett may also refer to:

- Roger B. Corbett, American academic and college administrator
- Roger Corbett (musician) of The Bushwackers

== See also ==
- Roger Corbet (disambiguation)
