= Hayford =

Hayford may refer to the following people:

- Adelaide Casely-Hayford (1868-1960), Sierra Leonean author and activist
- Harrison Hayford (1916-2001) Melville scholar.
- Jack W. Hayford (born 1934), American pastor
- John Fillmore Hayford (1868–1925), American geodesist
- J. E. Casely Hayford (1866–1930), Fante journalist, author and politician
- J. E. S. de Graft-Hayford (1912–2002), British-born Ghanaian Air Force Commander
- Justin Hayford (born 1970), American singer, pianist and AIDS activist

Hayford may also refer to the following places:

- Hayford (crater), on the Moon
- Hayford Park, Bangor, Maine
- Hayford Junction, railroad yard in Chicago, Illinois
