= William Blackman =

William Blackman or Blackmon may refer to:

- William Blackman (cricketer) (1862–1885), English cricketer
- William Fremont Blackman (1855–1932), president of Rollins College
- Billy Blackman (1895–1969), Australian rules footballer
- William Haden Blackman, American video game designer and writer
- Will Blackmon (born 1984), American football player
- William Joshua Blackmon (1921–2010), American street preacher and Milwaukee artist
