= Sing Chinese With Slater =

Studio album by Slater Rhea
- Released: February 5, 2019
- Genre: Educational, Pop, Folk, C-pop, Mandopop
- Length: 30:08

Sing Chinese With Slater (Chinese: 跟帅德一起唱中文！; pinyin: gēn shuàidé yīqǐ chàng zhōngwén) is the first studio album by Slater Rhea. It was first reported in September 2018 as part of a China Daily feature on Rhea, who was said to be "recording an album of songs he has written".

The album was released in connection with Rhea's February–March 2019 tour of U.S. schools and is composed of 14 original songs by Rhea, each touching on one or more Chinese language or culture points, for instance, greetings, family members or Chinese zodiac signs.

== Reaction ==
Stanford University Professor of East Asian Languages Chaofen Sun was reported to have called Rhea's songs "beautiful and moving" while dubbing Rhea a "musical emissary between the Chinese and American peoples". Williams College Professor of Chinese and Asian Studies Cornelius Kubler reportedly said that the songs "possess considerable pedagogical value" while remarking that Rhea sang "very clearly and with excellent standard Mandarin pronunciation".

== Track listing ==
1. "Hello, Hello"（《你好，你好》） – 1:53
2. "I Love My Family"（《我爱我的家》） – 2:30
3. "Chinese ABC's"（《拼音歌》） – 1:35
4. "Counting Stars"（《数星星》） – 3:22
5. "Chinese Zodiac Animals"（《十二生肖》） – 3:00
6. "I Love Fruit"（《我爱吃水果》） – 2:12
7. "Rainbow, Rainbow In The Sky"（《彩虹，彩虹在天上》） – 2:30
8. "Let's Do Sports"（《一起运动》） – 2:17
9. "The Four Seasons"（《一年有四季》） – 2:22
10. "How's The Weather?"（《天气怎么样？》） – 2:05
11. "Get Up"（《起床啦》） – 2:32
12. "I'm Gonna Succeed"（《我会成功的》） – 2:10
13. "Wash, Wash, Wash Your Hands"（《洗洗洗洗手》） – 1:35
14. "See You Later"（《再见》） – 2:05
