= Roger Corbet (disambiguation) =

Roger Corbet (c. 1501–1538) was an English politician and landowner.

Roger Corbet or Corbett may also refer to:

- Roger Corbet (died 1395), ancestor of the above, MP for Shropshire in three Parliaments
- Roger Corbet (died 1430), his son, MP twice for Shrewsbury and once for Shropshire

== See also ==
- Roger Corbett, Australian businessman
- Roger Corbett (disambiguation)
