= SAIS Europe =

Italian campus of Johns Hopkins SAIS

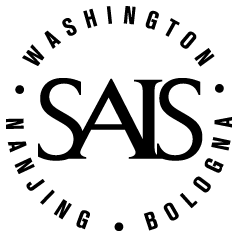
- Type: Private
- Established: 1955; 71 years ago
- Parent institution: Johns Hopkins University
- Academic affiliations: APSIA
- Rector: Renaud Dehousse
- Postgraduates: 242 (Fall 2023)
- Location: Bologna, Italy 44°29′41″N 11°21′21″E
- Campus: Urban
- Website: sais.jhu.edu/sais-europe

The SAIS Europe, located in Bologna, Italy, is the European campus of the School of Advanced International Studies (SAIS) under Johns Hopkins University. SAIS Europe's degree programs emphasize international economics, international relations, European Union policy, and global risk with options to specialize in a broad range of other policy areas and geographic regions.

The Bologna Center, later renamed SAIS Europe in 2013, was founded in 1955 by American academic Charles Grove Haines. The campus was initially a Cold War era project that is believed to have been funded by the CIA to establish a pro-American foothold in the center of Communism in Europe. In 1961, the school moved to its current location on Via Beniamino Andreatta (formerly named Via Belmeloro), where it was inaugurated by the then university president, Milton S. Eisenhower. A major renovation of its facilities was completed in 2006.

Notable alumni at SAIS have included foreign ministers, ambassadors, corporate board members, journalists, and deans at academic institutions. As of 2020, SAIS Europe has 8000+ alumni from 115 countries.

== Overview ==
Foreign Policy magazine has included SAIS among top master's degree programs for those pursuing a career in international relations.

SAIS Europe has an enrollment of about 200 students from 40 countries with a student-faculty ratio of approximately 6 to 1. One of the distinguishing characteristics of the school is its resident faculty complemented by some 40 adjunct professors drawn from universities, institutes, think tanks, international NGOs, consulting firms, and financial institutions in Europe and beyond. In a typical year, students can choose from more than 70 course offerings.

The rector of SAIS Europe is Renaud Dehousse, a Belgian lawyer, academic, and university administrator. Prior to assuming the rectorate of SAIS Europe in January 2024, Dehousse was president of the European University Institute (EUI) from 2016 to 2024. Dehousse was also a professor at the Paris Institute of Political Studies, where he chaired the Board of Directors from 2013 to 2016.

In 2022, SAIS Europe alumnus '81 James Anderson and his spouse, Morag Anderson, donated $100 million to support the European campus.

SAIS Europe is located next to the Brown in Bologna campus by the Brown University Department of Italian Studies, and the University of Bologna campus, the oldest university in Europe. The SAIS Europe campus has previously been featured in popular media: in 2012, HGTV House Hunters International (HHI!) Season 32 Episode 6 "Hitting the Books in Bologna, Italy" filmed MAGR candidate Kevin Rejent at the campus.

== Degree Programs Offered ==
- Master of Arts in International Relations - MAIR: The MAIR is a two-year program that explores the links between economics, geopolitics, security, and the environment. The first year is in Bologna and the second year at the SAIS Washington DC campus. Candidates are required to specialize in one functional area and one regional area during their degree.
- Master of Arts in International Affairs - MAIA: The MAIA is a two-year research-focused degree where students have the flexibility to pursue a personalized curriculum. Candidates can opt to spend both years in Bologna or spend one of two years at one of the cooperative degree partners, such as the Hopkins Nanjing Center, Sciences Po Lille, Diplomatic Academy of Vienna, McGill University, SOAS University of London, Tel Aviv University, Leiden University, and the University of Bologna.
- Master of International Public Policy - MIPP: The MIPP is a one-year degree course for experienced professionals with at least seven years of experience, who wish to develop advanced analytical and leadership skills. Candidates can complete the degree full-time in one academic year, or part-time in two to three years through evening courses.
- Master of Arts in Global Risk - MAGR: The MAGR program is a one-year, cohort-based program aimed at equipping candidates with the skills, concepts, and analytical techniques necessary to tackle complex political and economic risk analysis. The program is selective and admits around 10 student a year.
- Master of Arts in European Public Policy - MEPP: The MEPP is a one-year degree that provides a working knowledge of how Europe functions in a globalized world. It covers issues including climate and sustainability, energy security, public health, data protection and digitization, as well as trade, finance, foreign affairs, and security policy, with a focus on EU decision-making.
- Dual Degree (with MAIR): Candidates can typically complete both degrees up to one year faster. These include MAIR-MBA with the Johns Hopkins Carey Business School, INSEAD, University of Virginia Darden School of Business, Dartmouth College Tuck School of Business, and the University of Pennsylvania Wharton School; MAIR-Master of Law with Tsinghua University; MAIR-MPA with Syracuse University; MAIR-MSPH with the Johns Hopkins Bloomberg School of Public Health; MAIR-JD with Stanford Law School, and the University of Virginia School of Law; as well as the MAIR-MIEF with the National University of Singapore. Candidates can request to pursue a dual degree with institutions other than the listed partner schools.
- Exchange Programs: MAIR candidates entering their third semester can participate in exchange programs with the Hertie School of Governance, National University of Singapore, Tsinghua University, and Sciences Po.
- Diploma in International Studies: The SAIS Europe Diploma is a one-year sequence where candidates can pursue a personalized curriculum.
- Johns Hopkins University BA/MA Program: The five-year BA/MA program with SAIS in Washington, D.C., allows select undergraduate students to pursue an intensive program in international studies and also obtain a Master of Arts in International Relations (MAIR) from SAIS. All students may apply to spend their first year of SAIS at the Bologna campus.
- Johns Hopkins University Junior Year Study Abroad: Undergraduate students pursuing the International Studies Program can apply to spend their junior year or one semester at SAIS Europe.

== Research Institutions and Publications ==
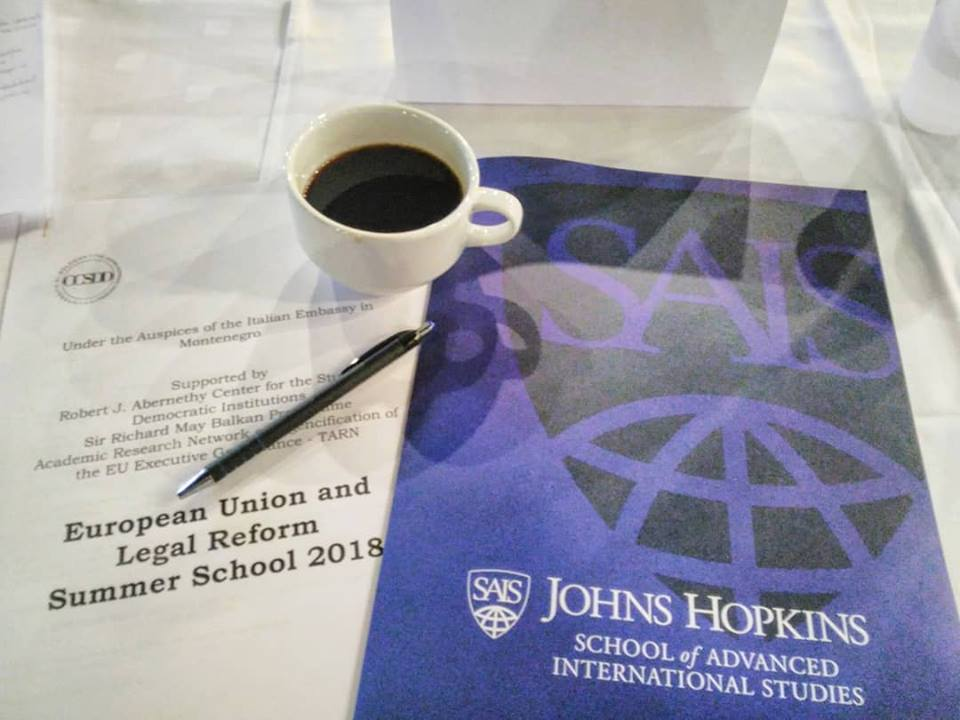
2018 Summer School Materials (Igalo, Montenegro).

- The Center for Constitutional Studies and Democratic Development: The CCSDD is a joint project of the Bologna Center and the University of Bologna Faculty of Law. It conducts research and training in the field of comparative constitutional law, focusing on countries undergoing a process of democratic transition. Through conferences, workshops, publications, summer schools, study trips, and speaker series, the CCSDD addresses issues of civil society development and legal reform.
- The Bologna Institute for Policy Research: The BIPR is the research division of SAIS Europe. The purpose of the institute is to promote problem-centered, interdisciplinary research in international policy by drawing upon the global network of SAIS faculty, students and scholars.
- The SAIS Europe Journal of Global Affairs: The SAIS Europe Journal of International Affairs is a scholarly journal run by the students of SAIS Europe, published by the center yearly since 1997. Its stated purpose is to provide, 'a forum for the discussion and dissemination of ideas about current issues in the field of international relations to a broad audience concerned with foreign relations.'
- The Italian Foreign Policy Dialogue: The Italian Foreign Policy Dialogue is a forum for Italian academics, foreign affairs professionals and think-tanks. It aims to improve communication between these groups and improve the effectiveness of Italian foreign policy.
