= Anthony G. Collins =

American academic (born 1949)

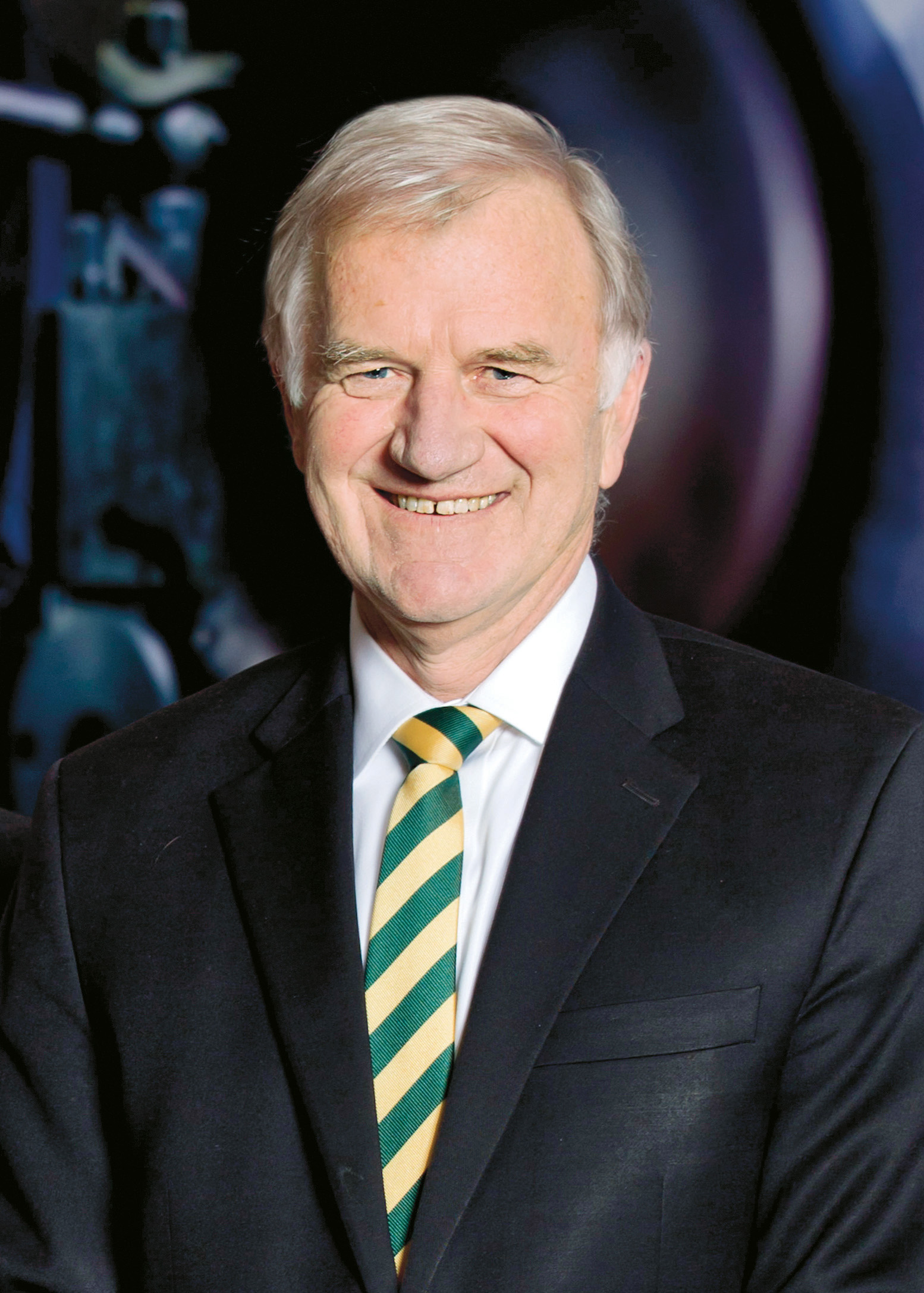

16th President of Clarkson University
- In office July 1, 2003 – June 30, 2022
- Succeeded by: Marc P. Christensen

Personal details
- Born: 1949 (age 76–77)
- Education: Monash University (B.S.); Lehigh University (Ph.D.)

Anthony G. Collins (born 1949) was the 16th President of Clarkson University in Potsdam, New York.

== Early life, education, and career ==
Collins grew up outside Melbourne, Australia. He earned an undergraduate civil engineering degree from Monash University, and his master's and Ph.D. degrees from Lehigh University in Pennsylvania. Prior to his doctoral studies, he worked for Australian Consolidated Industries and Utah Development Company.

== Career at Clarkson ==
After receiving his Ph.D. in 1982, Collins began his academic career as an assistant professor of civil and environmental engineering at Clarkson. He eventually rose to the rank of professor, and served many administrative roles, including department chair, dean, vice president for academic affairs, and provost. He was elected the 16th president of Clarkson University in 2003.

At Clarkson, He received the John W. Graham Faculty Research Award, the Distinguished Teaching Award, and two Outstanding Advising awards. In February 2007, Collins was recognized by Lehigh University for his accomplishments in advancing engineering education and as a leader in higher education, when he received the Lynn S. Beedle Award.

Collins is a regional and national advocate for higher education-industrial partnerships that couple research discovery and engineering innovation with enterprise for commercialization and economic development with a focus on advancing sustainable energy solutions and environmental technology innovation. New York State Governor Andrew Cuomo appointed Collins in July 2011 to serve as co-chair for the North Country Regional Economic Development Council. He served in that role until February 2019.

He is the 2020-2021 chair-elect of the Association of Independent Technological Universities (AITU). Collins is chair emeritus and a trustee of the Commission on Independent Colleges and Universities (CICU), an executive board member of the Central New York Metropolitan Development Authority (MDA), president of the Seaway Private Equity Corporation (SPEC), vice president of the Associated Colleges of St. Lawrence Valley, and a board member of CITEC Manufacturing & Technology Solutions and the New York Indoor Environmental Quality Center (NYIEQ).

In fall of 2006, Collins and his family moved into a new president's house on campus. In 2003, the University Board of Trustees had chosen to sell the previous president's house (known as Hepburn House) due to its deteriorating condition and distance from the campus. Collins and his family lived in their own home in the Village of Potsdam until the move. Funding for the new home came completely as donations from the trustees and not from the university's general fund or other gifts. The trustees said that they believed it was important for the president's house to be on campus. In addition to serving as living space for the president and his family, the new home is designed for hosting students, prospective students, faculty, alumni and university benefactors.

He was succeeded by Marc P. Christensen, PhD, PE, who began serving as the 17th president on July 1, 2022.
