= Amy Celico =

American educator

Amy P. Celico is an American China policy specialist who has served as executive director of Schwarzman Scholars, the graduate fellowship program at Tsinghua University in Beijing, since March 2025. She was previously a principal of Albright Stonebridge Group (ASG) and head of the firm's China team in Washington, DC. She earlier worked as a diplomat for the US Departments of State, Defense, Commerce, and the Office of the US Trade Representative.

== Education ==
Amy Celico graduated with a B.A. with honors in Asian Studies from Mount Holyoke College in 1991. She earned her M.A. in International Economics and Strategic Studies at the Johns Hopkins School of Advanced International Studies. She also attended the Hopkins-Nanjing Center in China.

== Career ==
Previously, she was Deputy Director of the Office of the Chinese Economic Area at the U.S. Department of Commerce. In addition, Amy Celico worked at the U.S. State Department, where she was a Foreign Affairs Analyst in the Bureau of Research and Intelligence and a Vice Consul for economic affairs at the U.S. Consulate in Shanghai.

She has stated that early on in her career, she expected to become a Chinese historian. Turning to a career in the U.S. government was an unexpected career turn for her.

She regularly contributes to global business panels.

In February 2025, Schwarzman Scholars announced that Celico would become its executive director effective March 3, 2025, overseeing day-to-day operations of the program's New York office. She joined the program after nearly two decades at Albright Stonebridge Group and its successor firm, DGA-Albright Stonebridge Group, where she was a partner and co-lead of the China practice.
