= Phyllis Hayford Hutchings =

American astronomer

- Phyllis Hayford Hutchings, from the 1936 yearbook of Rollins College
- Born: May 18, 1904; Washington, D.C., U.S.
- Died: July 7, 1965 (aged 61); Lawrence, Kansas, U.S.
- Occupations: Astronomer, engineer, college professor

Phyllis Hayford Hutchings (May 18, 1904 – July 7, 1965) was an American astronomer, engineer, and college professor. She taught astronomy at Rollins College in Florida, and at Whitman College in Washington.

== Early life and education ==
Hayford was born in Washington, D.C., the daughter of John Fillmore Hayford and Lucy Dalzell Stone Hayford. Her father was director of the College of Engineering at Northwestern University. She earned a degree in civil engineering from Northwestern University in 1926, and earned a Ph.D. in astronomy at the University of California, Berkeley, in 1932. Her dissertation was titled "The Galactic Rotation Effect in Open Clusters".

== Career ==
Hayford worked at Lick Observatory from 1926 to 1937, in various positions, including assistant to Donald Howard Menzel, computer and research fellow. Her work their often involved calculating the orbits of comets. She taught astronomy at Rollins College in Florida from 1935 to 1943, and at Whitman College in Washington from 1947 until her death in 1965. She also spoke to school and community groups about astronomy topics.

== Publications ==
- "A Brilliant Meteor" (1927)
- "Elements and ephemeris of Minor Planet 1929 PA" (1930, with Charlotte E. Moore)
- "Elements and ephemeris of Comet D 1930 (Schwassmann-Wachmann)" (1930, with Claude M. Anderson Jr.)
- "Observations of Comet B 1929 (Neujmin) and of minor planets" (1930, with C. J. Krieger, N. T. Bobrovnikoff, F. L. Whipple, and Charlotte E. Moore)
- "A study of galactic rotation with special reference to the radial velocities of the galactic star clusters" (1932)
- "Occultation of an 8.9 Magnitude Star by Jupiter" (1933)
- "Observations of Eros made at the Lick Observatory during the opposition of 1931, with a preliminary determination of the solar parallax" (1937, with R. J. Trumpler, F. J. Neubauer, C. E. Smith, and K. P. Kaster)

== Personal life ==
Hayford married mathematician William Lawrence Hutchings in 1934; they had a daughter, Lucy, born in 1938. Phyllis Hutchings died in 1965, at the age of 61, while she was teaching a summer course in Lawrence, Kansas.
