= Slater Rhea =

American singer and songwriter in China

- 帅德
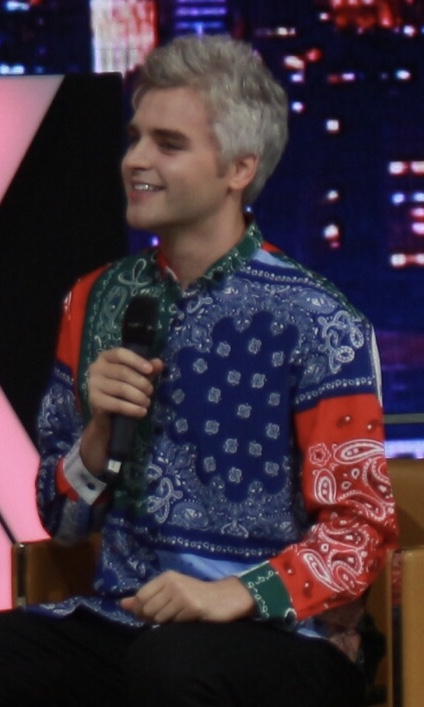
- Rhea in 2019
- Born: Slater David Rhea; 1987 (age 38–39); Alexandria, Louisiana, U.S.
- Education: Johns Hopkins University; Nanjing University; University of Oklahoma
- Occupations: Singer, songwriter, TV personality
- Website: shuaideslater.com

Slater David Rhea (Chinese: 帅德; pinyin: Shuài Dé; born 1987) is an American singer, songwriter and television personality based in China. Rhea is a performer of Chinese music and has made appearances on China Central Television, China Education Television as well as local and provincial television stations across China. Rhea performs in Chinese (primarily Mandarin, but also in Shaanxi dialect), Mongolian, and English. While he rose to prominence in China for singing traditional Chinese folk tunes, he also writes and sings Chinese pop and educational music and performs a variety of English-language material including American jazz standards and rock-and-roll.

Rhea has been referred to in Chinese and international media as a cultural ambassador and "musical diplomat" because of his background in international relations and dream to improve U.S.–China relations through his music and performances. Rhea additionally credits former U.S. Secretary of State Madeleine Albright, whom he met and sang for in 2016, as an inspiration to pursue a career in cultural diplomacy. Rhea lives in Beijing and, in addition to his entertainment career, holds a position as lecturer in English and International Studies at Beijing Foreign Studies University.

== Life and career ==
Rhea was born and raised in Alexandria, Louisiana, where he was first singled out to sing solos in his Catholic church choir and learned piano and violin in local music programs. He was enrolled in the Boy Scouts of America from grade one and earned the rank of Eagle Scout at age 13.

He graduated from the Louisiana School for Math, Science and the Arts in Natchitoches, Louisiana, before attending the University of Oklahoma as a National Merit Scholar, where he earned dual bachelor's degrees in Chinese Language and Literature and Asian Studies. He attended the Johns Hopkins University-Nanjing University Center for Chinese and American Studies in Nanjing, China, where he studied, wrote and defended a 100-page thesis in Mandarin and earned dual master's degrees in China Studies and International Politics from Johns Hopkins University and Nanjing University while first performing on Nanjing-based Jiangsu TV.

=== Connection to Xi'an, Shaanxi folk songs, and biangbiang noodles ===
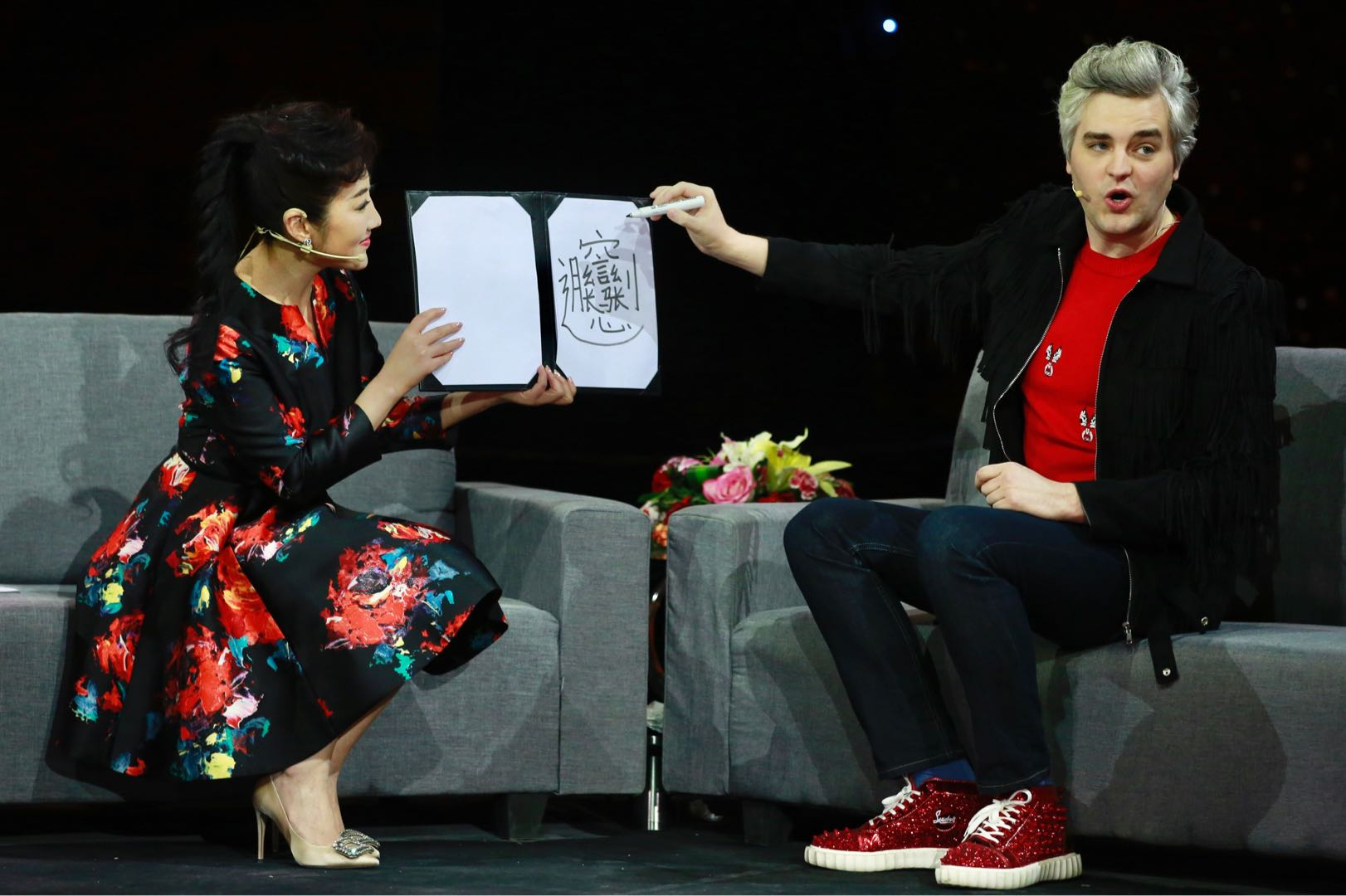
Rhea writes and explains a "biang" character on Xi'an TV.

Rhea has a close connection with the ancient Chinese capital of Xi'an (and Shaanxi Province) and its culture, having first visited the city and established connections there in 2010. Rhea often sings North Shaanxi folk songs, which he first heard and fell in love with on his first visit to China. His connection to Xi'an and Shaanxi Province is often discussed in his TV appearances, including his love of Shaanxi's distinctive cuisine, including roujiamo ("Chinese hamburger"), liangpi (cold noodles), yangrou paomo (lamb stew with bits of crumbled flatbread), fried persimmon cakes, and, most prominently, biangbiang noodles (Shaanxi's famous 'thick-as-a-belt' handmade noodles).

The "biang" in biangbiang noodles is known for being one of the most complex Chinese characters; and Rhea made front-page news in Shaanxi province's Chinese Business View when he first wrote the character on CCTV. Show hosts and guests often "test" Rhea's ability to write it, and as a result, Rhea has since been associated with the character in Chinese media. For instance, CCTV host Zhu Jun demonstrated to him how Shaanxi people crouch down to eat the noodles (a folk custom in Shaanxi); in other cases, Rhea has taught other TV personalities, for instance Hong Kong singer Leo Ku, to write the character while reciting a mnemonic poem for remembering the character's 43 strokes.

== Discography ==
=== Albums ===
- 2019: Sing Chinese With Slater (跟帅德一起唱中文！)

=== Singles ===
- 2021:《过大年》("Happy Chinese New Year")
- 2019:《中国我的家》("China, My Home")
- 2019:《中国姑娘》("Chinese Girl")
- 2019:《天籁之爱》(with 阿鲁阿卓)
- 2019:《敖包相会》(with 阿木古楞)
