= Hibernia National Bank =

Former bank in New Orleans Louisiana

Hibernia Corporation
- Industry: Banking
- Founded: April 1870; 156 years ago
- Defunct: November 16, 2005; 20 years ago
- Fate: Acquired by Capital One
- Headquarters: New Orleans, Louisiana
- Area served: Louisiana, Texas
- Key people: J. Herbert Boydstun, President & CEO; Marsha M. Gassan, CFO
- Total assets: ▲$22.3 billion (2004)
- Number of employees: 6,210 (2004)

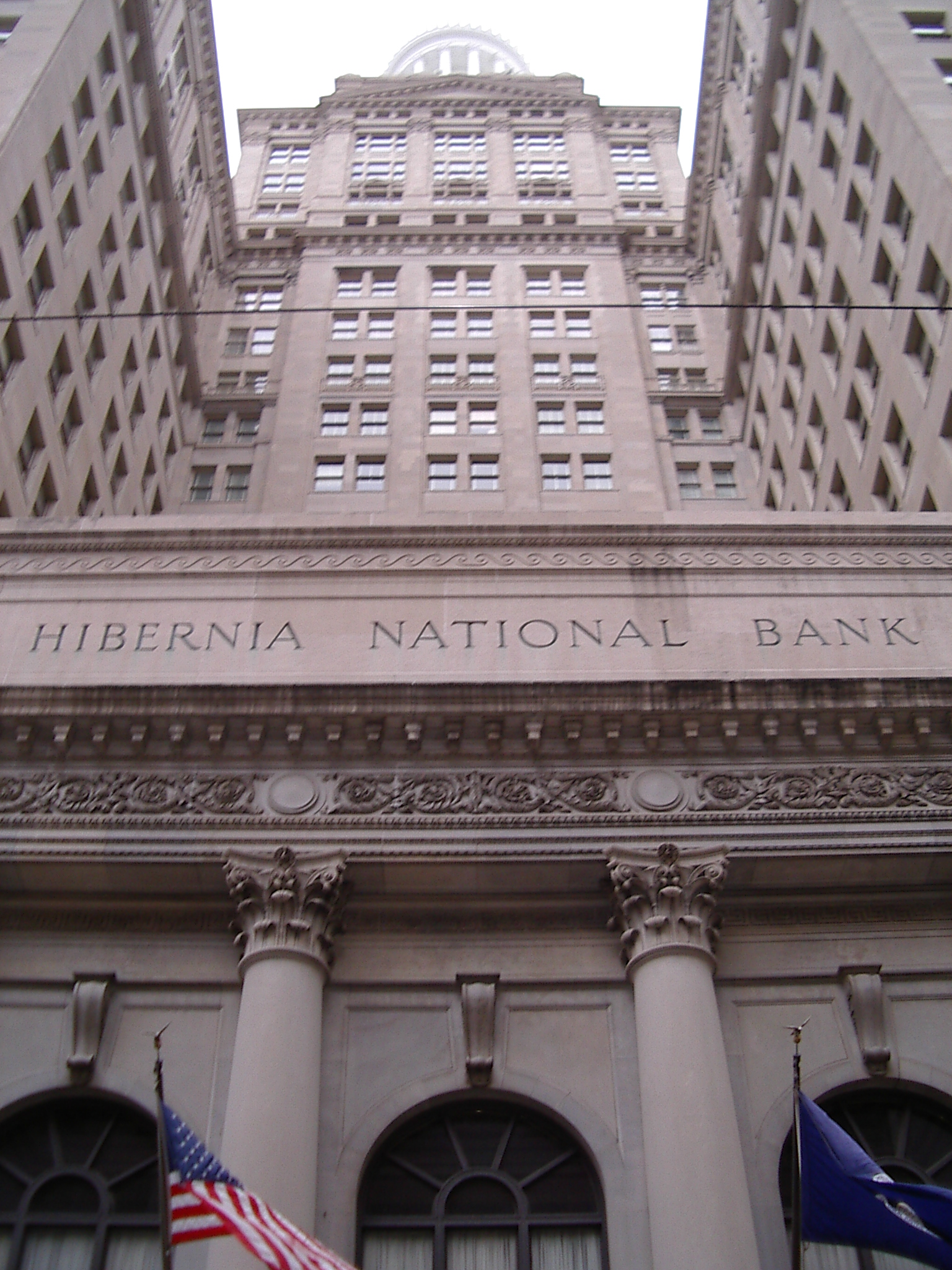
The Hibernia Bank Building in the New Orleans Central Business District. Although all former Hibernia branches have been re-branded as Capital One, this building's historic name and signage remain unaltered.

Hibernia National Bank was a bank headquartered in New Orleans, Louisiana. The bank was the primary subsidiary of Hibernia Corporation, a bank holding company. In November 2005, the bank was acquired by Capital One.

Hibernia is the classical Latin name for Ireland. The logo of the bank included a harp, the national symbol of Ireland.

== History ==
In April 1870, three Irish-American businessmen co-founded the Hibernia Bank & Trust Company in New Orleans. Patrick Irwin was named the first President, Hugh McCloskey, the first Vice-President, and Thomas Fitzwilliam, first Secretary. In September 1870, the bank began operations.

In 1973, the board of directors hired 38-year-old Martin C. Miler, formerly an executive at First Union, to be the bank's president and chairman. In 1975, the Louisiana legislature approved multi-parish banking. By 1983, Hibernia grew to be the largest bank in the state in terms of assets. Despite its operations in Louisiana, the bank never lent heavily to the petroleum industry.

In 1989, the bank entered Texas via the acquisition of First State Bank of Pflugerville, which was shut down by regulators as a result of bank failure.

In 1990, the bank acquired BancTexas after it also failed.

The bank had positive growth every quarter from 1973 to 1990; however, in 1990, as a result of the savings and loan crisis, the bank reported a loss, eliminated its dividend and needed capital.

In 1991, Martin Miler retired.

In 1992, the company sold its operations in Texas to Comerica for $63.1 million in cash. The company also recapitalized by giving Chase Manhattan Bank a majority ownership stake in the company in exchange for debt forgiveness.

In 2000, the company entered the insurance business with the acquisition of The Rosenthal Agency.

In 2003, the company re-entered the Texas market with the acquisition of Coastal Bancorp. The company also announced plans to open additional branches in Texas.

In November 2005, Capital One acquired the company. The acquisition price was re-negotiated downward after Hurricane Katrina struck New Orleans.
