= Winthrop C. Libby =

- Born: 1912; Caribou, Maine
- Died: 1993 (aged 77–78)
- Education: University of Maine; Rutgers University; Cornell University
- Known for: President of the University of Maine
- Scientific career
- Fields: Agronomy

Winthrop C. Libby (1912–1993) was an American agronomist, educator and academic administrator who served as the president of the University of Maine from April 17, 1969, to August 31, 1973.

== Biography ==
Libby was a native of Caribou, Maine, United States. He was a graduate of the University of Maine and received both his bachelor's and master's degrees from UMaine. He pursued additional studies in agronomy at Rutgers University and Cornell University. His entire UMaine career started in 1934, from an assistant professor of agronomy to full professor and then chair of the department. He served as dean of the College of Life Sciences and Agriculture and director of the Cooperative Extension Service before being named president in 1969. He dedicated to improve the learning environment at UMaine during a time when the structure and goals of higher education were under intense scrutiny in the nation and laid the groundwork for the Franco-American Center on campus.

Libby Hall is the home of University of Maine Cooperative Extension, which was dedicated in 1990 in his honor.
