= Leslie Jacobs =

Leslie Rosenthal Jacobs (born 1959, New Orleans, Louisiana) is a charter school advocate, business executive, and philanthropist. She was a business partner with an elementary school, served as an elected member of the Orleans Parish School Board, and then, as a member of the State Board of Elementary and Secondary Education (BESE) for twelve years, first appointed by Governor Foster (R) and then re-appointed by Governor Blanco (D). Jacobs pushed for reform of Louisiana Public Schools in the 1990s and 2000s. Her work to implement charter schools has been controversial.

== Business ==
Jacobs was born and raised in New Orleans, where she attended Isidore Newman School, a private school, where she also sent her own children to school. She began work at her family's independent insurance agency in 1981 after graduating from Cornell University. In 2000, Hibernia National Bank purchased the agency, and Jacobs became President of the merged Hibernia Rosenthal Agency. She remained president until 2002. In 2006, Hibernia, the largest deposit holder in Southeast Louisiana, was purchased by Capital One and re-branded under the Capital One banner. She went on to become a co-founder of Strategic Comp, a workers compensation insurance company that sold to Great American in 2008. Jacobs served as past chair of GNO, Inc., a non-profit economic development corporation dedicated to cultivating the Greater New Orleans area's economy. She was CEO and co-founder of the New Orleans Startup Fund, a nonprofit venture fund focused on business creation and innovation in the 10-parish Greater New Orleans region.

== Orleans Parish School Board ==
In 1992, Jacobs ran for a position on the Orleans Parish School Board from District 6, a majority African-American district comprising much of southwestern Orleans Parish, including parts of Dixon, Uptown, Mid-City and the Black Pearl. She ran in an open primary and placed first, taking 29% of the vote, or about 3,575 votes. In the run-off election, Jacobs received 13,909 votes and defeated fellow Democrat Henry Julien 59% to 41%. She served on the board until 1996, and in her final year, served as board vice-president.

== Louisiana State Board of Elementary and Secondary Education ==
Jacobs was appointed in 1996 to the State Board of Elementary and Secondary Education and served as a gubernatorial appointee until 2008, serving both Republican Governor Mike Foster and Democratic Governor Kathleen Blanco. Jacobs advocated for and implemented reform of Louisiana's Public Schools throughout the 1990s and 2000s, including developing and implementing a school accountability system. According to a 2009 Education Watch Report released by the Education Trust, Louisiana was the only state in which the gap between African American and white students has narrowed significantly in both 4th grade reading and 8th grade math.

As part of Louisiana's school accountability system, Jacobs helped create the Recovery School District (RSD) in 2003. The RSD is administered by the Department of Education, and is designed to take over academically failing schools.

== Mayoral campaign ==
Jacobs ran for Mayor in the 2010 New Orleans mayoral election. Her platform included: safe streets, better schools and honorable government. Jacobs decided to exit the race when Mitch Landrieu made entered the field.

== Personal life ==
Jacobs is married to Scott Jacobs. She has two daughters and four grandchildren. Jacobs has lived in Denver since 2018.

== Awards ==
- "Twenty People Who Influenced Louisiana 1981-2001," Louisiana Life Magazine
- "Co-New Orleanian of the Year," Gambit Weekly
- "Whitney Young, Jr. Award", Boy Scouts of America
- Tricentennial Award (2018), NOLA.com
- Alumna of the Year, 2013, Isidore Newman School
- Role Model, Young Leadership Council (YLC)
- Business Hall of Fame Role Model, Junior Achievement
- Role Model, YWCA
- Outstanding Young Woman, Louisiana Jaycee
- "Women of the Year," New Orleans CityBusiness
- Board of Directors Award for community service, Louisiana Association of Fundraising Executives
