= Elam J. Anderson =

Academic administrator

- Born: February 28, 1890; Chicago, Illinois
- Died: August 17, 1944 (aged 54)
- Education: Drake University; Cornell University; University of Chicago
- Scientific career
- Fields: Education

Elam J. Anderson (February 28, 1890 – August 17, 1944) was an educator and academic administrator who served as president of Linfield College in McMinnville, Ore. from 1932 to 1938 and as president of the University of Redlands from 1938 to 1944.

== Education ==
He earned his A.B. degree from Drake University in Des Moines, Iowa in 1912, a master's degree from Cornell University in 1915, and his Ph.D. from the University of Chicago in 1924.

== Career ==
He was a professor of education and music at the University of Shanghai in China from 1918-1926 and was principal of the Shanghai American School from 1926-1932. Following his service in China, he became the president of Linfield College from 1932 to 1938 and led the University of Redlands from 1938 to 1944 through the end of the Great Depression and during World War II and was instrumental in Redlands becoming a site for the U.S. Navy’s V-12 training program.
