= Lynn Okagaki =

American academic administrator

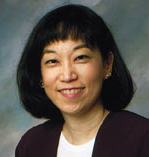
Lynn Okagaki

Lynn Okagaki is deputy provost for academic affairs at the University of Delaware. She was appointed to this position in January 2016, after serving as interim since July 2015.

As chief advisor to the Provost and a member of the senior leadership team for the University of Delaware, Okagaki oversees a number of academic and administrative units. Her major responsibilities include academic program planning and review, working with the Faculty Senate and deans to establish and review academic programs, working with the colleges in the design and delivery of general education, and overseeing the university's global initiatives and academic support services.

Okagaki came to the Office of the Provost from the University of Delaware's College of Education and Human Development, where she had been dean since 2011.

Prior to joining the University of Delaware, Okagaki was Commissioner of Education Research in the Institute of Education Sciences since December 2005. She was the commissioner of the National Center for Education Research and the interim commissioner of the National Center for Special Education Research, two of the four centers within the Institute of Education Sciences at the U.S. Department of Education.

Like many researchers in her field, Okagaki holds that views on intelligence may vary in different cultures, the majority of these views may not match Western views.

Okagaki was associate dean of the School of Consumer and Family Science and professor of Child Development and Family Studies at Purdue University. She has held appointments at Yale University, Cornell University and the University of Houston.

== Education ==
Okagaki received her Bachelor of Science degree in applied behavioral sciences from the University of California at Davis and her doctoral degree in developmental psychology from Cornell University.
