= Warren Elvin Wilson =

American civil engineer and college administrator

Warren Elvin Wilson was an American professor of civil engineering and college administrator. He was educated at Lehigh University with a B.S. in 1928, followed by Cornell University with an M.C.E. in 1932, California Institute of Technology with an M.S. in 1939. He received his Ph.D. from the University of Iowa in 1941. He served as president of South Dakota School of Mines and Technology from 1948 to 1953.
