= Kristin Esterberg =

American sociologist and university administrator

Kristin G. Esterberg
- Education: Boston University; Cornell University
- Known for: Chancellor University of Washington Bothell (2021-Present)
- Scientific career
- Fields: Sociologist, University President

Kristin G. Esterberg is an American sociologist and administrator who has been serving as the sixteenth president of the State University of New York at Potsdam since June 30, 2014. She has been offered and has accepted a position as the new Chancellor of the University of Washington Bothell to start October 1, 2021 - this is subject to approval by the UW Board of Regents.

== Biography ==
Esterberg was educated at Boston University where she received a bachelor's degree (B.A.) in philosophy and political science, magna cum laude (1982). She went on to earn a master's degree (M.A.) in 1988 and a Ph.D. in 1991 in sociology from Cornell University.

She started her career as a lecture of sociology at Cornell from 1990 to 1991 and was on faculty of the University of Missouri–Kansas City from 1991 to 1997. Between 1997 and 2008, she was an assistant professor, then an associate professor of sociology at the University of Massachusetts Lowell. While at UMass Lowell, she served as chair of sociology department from 2002 to 2004, associate provost from 2004 to 2007 and deputy provost 2007. From 2009 to 2014, she was provost and academic vice president at Salem State University. She was selected as the president of the State University of New York at Potsdam in 2014.
