= Melody Rose =

Melody Rose became the 15th president of Marylhurst University in 2014. Prior to her Marylhurst presidency, Rose was the first female Chancellor of the Oregon University System (OUS).

She was appointed the interim chancellor of the OUS from February 2013 to May 2014, and was later appointed Chancellor from May 2014 to August 2014.

Before moving to the Oregon University System, Rose served in a number of roles at Portland State University, culminating in her service as vice provost for academic programs and instruction and dean of undergraduate studies. She is also the founder and first director of the Center for Women's Leadership. Rose was also professor and chair of the political science division before moving into academic administration.

While on the PSU faculty, Rose authored a number of award-winning books, articles and chapters on the U.S. presidency, social policy, women and politics, and elections. Her fourth book, an edited volume entitled Women and Executive Office: Pathways and Performance, was published during the 2012 elections.

She received her bachelor's degree in politics from the University of California, Santa Cruz (Phi Beta Kappa) and a master's degree in public administration, a master's in government and a Ph.D. in government from Cornell University.

Rose volunteers for education, civic engagement and women's organizations. She was a 2013 Portland Business Journal Women of Influence honoree, and she received the 2010 Governor's Women of Achievement Award. She served as president of the City Club of Portland in 2011–12, and she is an active member of the International Women's Forum.

On May 17, 2018, Marylhurst University announced it would close its doors after 125 years of service. In a May 17, 2018, press release, Chip Terhune, chair-elect of the Marylhurst Board of Trustees, which voted on May 16, 2018, to close the institution, thanked Rose for her leadership in difficult times. "On behalf of my fellow Trustees, I want to thank Dr. Rose for her expertise and leadership during these challenging times and express our continued trust in her as she shepherds our community through this transition," Terhune said. "We value her guidance and her insistence on prioritizing what’s best for students, faculty and the rest of the Marylhurst community."
