= Guillermo Gallego =

American data scientist, academic and author

- Occupations: Data scientist, academic and author

Academic background
- Education: University of California, San Diego; Cornell University

Guillermo Gallego is the Liu Family Emeritus professor at Columbia University, the Crown Worldwide Professor Emeritus at The Hong Kong University of Science and Technology and is the X.Q. Deng Presidential Chair Professorship at The Chinese University of Hong Kong, Shenzhen (CUHK-Shenzhen). Since 2025, he has served as the Dean of School of Data Science at CUHK-Shenzhen.

== Education ==
Gallego completed his B.A. in Mathematics from the University of California, San Diego in 1980. Later in 1987, he obtained his M.S. from Cornell University, followed by a PHD from the same institution in 1988.

== Career ==
Gallego began his academic career at Columbia University in 1988, holding various positions within the Department of Industrial Engineering and Operations Research, promoted to full professor in 2000, and to the Liu Family Professorship in 2012. Additionally, from 2016 to 2022, he served as the Crown Worldwide Professor of Engineering at The Hong Kong University of Science and Technology. Since 2022, he is the holder of the X.Q. Deng Presidential Chair Professorship at The Chinese University of Hong Kong, Shenzhen.

From 2002 to 2008, he held an appointment as the department chairman of Industrial Engineering and Operations Research (IEOR) at Columbia University. Gallego served as the department head of the Department of Industrial Engineering and Decision Analytics at Hong Kong University of Science and Technology from 2016 to 2021. He currently serves as the Operations Research Area Coordinator in the School of Data Science at the Chinese University of Hong Kong, Shenzhen. Since 2025, he has served as the Dean of School of Data Science at CUHK-Shenzhen.

== Research ==
Gallego, in his early research, explored how companies could smoothly recover from production schedule disruptions, and on integrating inventory control and vehicle routing to optimize distribution systems. His 1993 collaborative work presented a new proof of Scarf's ordering rule for the newsboy problem and extended its analysis to scenarios in inventory management, including the recourse case, fixed ordering costs, random yields, and multi-item competition for scarce resources. In the following year, he proposed dynamic pricing strategies for inventory management in industries with time-constrained sales, stochastic and price-sensitive demand, using intensity control, obtaining structural monotonicity, closed-form solutions, and extensions to more complex scenarios. On 1995, he addressed the optimization of pricing strategies for industries facing fixed stock and finite horizon challenges. The study determined the optimal timing of mark-ups or mark-downs based on stochastic demand and price sensitivity to maximize revenues.

Gallego's 1997 work proposed stochastic pricing strategies to optimize network revenue management problems, deriving asymptotic optimality results for simple policies. In 2001, he explored optimal inventory control policies, such as state-dependent (s, S) and base-stock policies, considering advance demand information, aiming to improve revenue, capacity use, and operational performance in stochastic inventory systems. In 2008, he explored the strategic use of callable products, analyzing their role in generating riskless additional revenue in the context of revenue management problems. While investigating the assortment optimization problems under the nested logit model in 2014, he demonstrated that the problem is polynomial solvability for the standard model, and proposed heuristic strategies for NP-hard cases. Later in 2016, he introduced a Markov chain choice model for assortment planning, approximating discrete choice models, optimizing assortments, and offering insights into substitution behavior.

In 2022, he presented a learning algorithm for a firm to optimize revenue through personalized pricing for various consumer types over a finite selling period, using a primal-dual formulation to explicitly learn the dual optimal solution and overcoming the curse of dimensionality. His more recent work has focused on personalized pricing and personalized assortment optimization.

In 2019, Gallego authored a book titled Revenue Management and Pricing Analytics with H. Topaloglu. Through this book, he bridged the disparity between current research findings and well-established literature within the field. Georgia Perakis from Massachusetts Institute of Technology, in her review of the book said "The book by Gallego and Topaloglu provides a fresh, up-to-date and in depth treatment of revenue management and pricing. It fills an important gap as it covers not only traditional revenue management topics but also new and important topics such as revenue management under customer choice as well as pricing under competition and online learning." She also lauded the book's ability to cater to a diverse range of readers, from advanced undergraduates to those pursuing masters and PhD degrees.

== Awards and honors ==
- 2011 – INFORMS Revenue Management and Pricing Historical Prize, INFORMS
- 2012 – Fellow, INFORMS
- 2021 – INFORMS Revenue Management and Pricing Section Prize, INFORMS

== Selected articles ==
- Gallego, G., & Van Ryzin, G. (1994). Optimal dynamic pricing of inventories with stochastic demand over finite horizons. Management science, 40(8), 999–1020.
- Feng, Y., & Gallego, G. (1995). Optimal starting times for end-of-season sales and optimal stopping times for promotional fares. Management science, 41(8), 1371–1391.
- Gallego, G., & Özer, Ö. (2001). Integrating replenishment decisions with advance demand information. Management science, 47(10), 1344–1360.
- Gallego, G. & O. Sahin. (2010). Revenue Management with Partially Refundable Fares. Operations Research, 58, 817 – 833.
- Gallego, G. & R. Wang. (2014). Multiproduct Price Optimization and Competition Under the Nested Logit Model with Product-Differentiated Price Sensitivities. Operation Research, 62 (2), 450–461.
- Gallego, G. & M. Hu. (2014). Dynamic Pricing of Perishable Assets under Competition. Management Science, 60 (5), 1241–1259.
- Blanchet, J., Gallego, G., & Goyal, V. (2016). A Markov chain approximation to choice modeling. Operations Research, 64(4), 886–905.
- Gallego, G., Li, A., Truong, V. A., & Wang, X. (2020). Approximation algorithms for product framing and pricing. Operations Research, 68(1), 134–160.
- Gao, P., Ma, Y., Chen, N., Gallego, G., Li, A., Rusmevichientong, P., & Topaloglu, H. (2021). Assortment optimization and pricing under the multinomial logit model with impatient customers: Sequential recommendation and selection. Operations research, 69(5), 1509–1532.
- Chen, N., & Gallego, G. (2022). A primal–dual learning algorithm for personalized dynamic pricing with an inventory constraint. Mathematics of Operations Research, 47(4), 2585–2613.
