= Joel Baines =

American virologist

- Education: University of Pennsylvania School of Veterinary Medicine; Cornell University College of Agriculture and Life Sciences
- Scientific career
- Fields: Virology
- Workplaces: Cornell University; Louisiana State University

Joel D. Baines is an American virologist who is serving as dean of the School of Veterinary Medicine, Louisiana State University (LSU) since 2014.

Dr. Joel Baines (PhD, VMD) received a bachelor's degree in microbiology from Kansas State University in 1979, earned his VMD degree from the University of Pennsylvania in 1983 and PhD in molecular virology from Cornell University in 1988. He did postdoctoral research at the University of Chicago. Baines was a James Law Professor of Virology in the Department of Microbiology and Immunology at Cornell. He was chosen as the sixth dean of LSU School of Veterinary Medicine in 2014 and holds the Dr. Kenneth F. Burns Chair in Veterinary Medicine.

Throughout his career he has studied many molecular aspects of herpes virus infections. During his postdoctoral research in Bernard Roizman's lab at the University of Chicago he identified UL10 as the HSV-1 gene that encodes glycoprotein M. Since his postdoctoral work he has had 6500 citations of his over 90 peer-reviewed research publications surrounding various aspects of HSV-1 replication. His lab is currently focused on how HSV-1 alters the host transcriptional machinery for its own benefit.
