= Qing Zhao =

Electrical engineer

Qing Zhao is the Joseph C. Ford Professor of Engineering in the Department of Electrical and Computer Engineering at Cornell University. Prior to joining Cornell, she held positions as a Systems Engineer at Aware, Incorporated (2001–2003) and on the Electrical and Computer Engineering faculty at the University of California, Davis. She is expert on sequential decision-making under uncertainty with a focus on infrastructure networks and communication systems.

== Education ==
B.S. (Electrical Engineering), Sichuan University, 1994

M.S. (Electrical Engineering), Fudan University, 1997

Ph.D. (Electrical Engineering), Cornell University, 2001

Postdoc (Electrical Engineering), Cornell University, 2004

== Awards ==
Zhao was named Fellow of the Institute of Electrical and Electronics Engineers (IEEE) in 2013 for contributions to learning and decision theory in dynamic systems with applications to cognitive networking.

Other awards include the Marie Sklodowska-Curie Fellow 2018–2019 and the Chancellor's Fellow 2010.
