= Richard M. Ramin =

American academic (born 1995)

Richard Max Ramin (November 22, 1929 – May 27, 1995) was an American university administrator and fundraiser, best known for his twenty-four-year tenure as Vice President for Public Affairs at Cornell University. Over the course of his forty-one years at Cornell, Ramin played a pivotal role in university development and fundraising.

== Early life and education ==
Ramin was born in Williamsport, Pennsylvania, to Richard and Florence Ramin. He attended Williamsport High School, where he was a standout football player. In 1946, he was named to the Pennsylvania All-State Team as a lineman. Ramin enrolled at Cornell University, where he joined the Sphinx Head society and Delta Kappa Epsilon fraternity. He graduated in 1951 with a degree in political science from Cornell’s College of Arts and Sciences.

After graduating, Ramin served two years in the U.S. Army as a First Lieutenant. He later worked as a Cruise Director for the Holland-American Steamship Lines.

== Football career ==
Ramin was involved in Cornell University’s football program as both a co-captain of the freshman team and a starting player on the varsity team from 1948 to 1950. During his time as a player, Cornell won two Ivy League football championships.

== University administrator ==
Ramin joined the Cornell University administration in 1954 as Alumni Field Secretary. He was promoted to Assistant Director of Admissions in 1956 and later served as Associate Director of Development. In 1964, Ramin became Director of Development at Cornell during a period of significant expansion under President James A. Perkins.

In 1971, Ramin was appointed Vice President for Public Affairs, a role in which he oversaw various university departments, including Alumni Affairs, Gift Services, University Development, and Public Affairs offices. Ramin’s leadership was instrumental in raising significant funds for the university. Under his direction, Cornell successfully completed the Centennial Campaign (1965), the 1980 Cornell Campaign ($250 million), and the 1991 Cornell Capital Campaign, which raised $1.25 billion by the time of Ramin’s death in 1995.

== Personal life ==
Ramin married Frances Anthony, a graduate of Keuka College, in 1956. The couple had two children: Robert Anthony Ramin (born 1960) and Nancy Alice Ramin (born 1963). Robert Ramin married Denise DeConcini, the daughter of former U.S. Senator Dennis DeConcini, in 1985. She took her medical degree from the George Washington University School of Medicine. She took her bachelor’s degree from Cornell University, as did Robert Ramin, who also took his masters in business administration from Cornell's Graduate School of Management.

== Associations ==
Dick Ramin was a member of the Delta Kappa Epsilon fraternity and the Sphinx Head honorary society. He served as a member of the Board of Managers of Willard Straight Hall (1956–58) and the Straight Board of Governors (1958–60). From 1956 to 1959, he was Delta Kappa Epsilon’s faculty advisor and also a member of Cornell’s National Scholarship Committee during the same period. Ramin was also involved in various administrative roles, including the university’s Administrative Systems Planning and Control Committee. He was an active member of professional organizations such as the American Alumni Council (AAC) and the American College Public Relations Association (ACPRA).

In the Ithaca community, Ramin contributed to local organizations, including the Tompkins County Chamber of Commerce, where he was a member, and the YMCA, where he served on the Board of Directors. He was also a deacon at the First Congregational Church and was involved in Explorer scouting and the United Way.

Harvey Sampson, a long-time confidante of Ramin, remarked that he was known for his modesty and his ability to give credit to others for their contributions. Former Cornell president Dale Corson summarized Ramin's legacy by noting his integrity, kindness, and dedication to the university.

== Death and legacy ==
Ramin died of pulmonary fibrosis on May 27, 1995. His death was widely mourned, with many noting his contributions to Cornell’s success. A memorial service was held at Sage Chapel on June 18, 1995, and Cornell’s Bartels Hall features a multipurpose room named in his honor "Ramin Room".
