= John M. Rosenberg =

German-American Holocaust survivor and activist

John Rosenberg (born 1931), is a Holocaust survivor, longtime civil and human rights activist, former attorney in the Civil Rights Division and founder of the Appalachian Research and Defense fund in Prestonsburg, Kentucky.

== Biography ==
Rosenberg was born in Magdeburg, Germany in 1931. On November 9, 1938, Kristallnacht, seven-year-old Rosenberg and his parents were pulled from their home by Nazis and stood in the court yard of the adjacent synagogue, where they were forced to watch the holy scriptures burned and the building blown up. His father was arrested the next day and sent to Buchenwald concentration camp for eleven days but was released later due to local government intervention. For a year afterward, Rosenberg stayed with his family in an internment camp in Rotterdam, Holland before leaving for America in February 1940. Upon arrival, Rosenberg and his parents moved in with his mother's sister's family in New York. His father had difficulty finding employment in the city, so the family moved to South Carolina where he worked as a janitor in a textile mill.

Rosenberg was the first in his family attend college, and while there, he joined the ROTC program. As a two-year commitment in a branch of the military was required after graduation, he decided to join the Air Force. After the Air Force, Rosenberg went to Law School at the University of North Carolina in 1959. During this time the civil rights movement was gaining momentum, and by the end of his studies in 1962, he obtained work through the Civil Rights Division of the United States Department of Justice. Working there provided him with a strong foundation for arguing court cases later in life, and it was also where he met his wife, Jean.

Rosenberg and his wife left the Civil Rights Division in 1970 and almost immediately were contacted by former colleague Terry Lenzner inquiring about his interest in joining an organization that would address issues surrounding poverty in Appalachia. The evolving organization became the Appalachian Research and Defense Fund, otherwise known as AppalReD.

Rosenberg worked as the Director of AppalReD for twenty-eight years before retiring, but retirement did not end his career as a human rights activist. He continued to speak publicly about the Holocaust and has written about his time working for the Civil Rights Division and AppalReD.

== Growing Up in the South ==
Living in the more rural south provided a different socialization for Rosenberg than for Holocaust survivors who remained in major metropolitan areas: without a large Jewish community with similar experiences, his upbringing was somewhat different from other survivors. However, Rosenberg claimed that his Jewish identity and adherence to Judaism was never a hindrance to his socialization and he was able to adapt with relative ease to his largely Christian community.

Rosenberg understood that his family was different from those in the congregations where his father acted as rabbi. Rosenberg recollected that many families were well-to-do and traveled frequently and his parents were not afforded such means. Adding to this disconnect was their status as Holocaust survivors and immigrants in contrast to the largely American-born Jews in the congregations. So, while Rosenberg was friendly with the people who attended the same congregation, there was a certain barrier to a mutual understanding of each other. How experiences like Rosenberg's inform identity and community in Appalachia is further explored in “This is Home Now: Kentucky’s Holocaust Survivors Speak,” a collection of interviews compiled by Arwen Donahue.

He contends that his experience with the persecution of Jewish people during WWII aided development of his passion for civil and human rights activism. Witnessing similar prejudice in the form of segregationist policies was particularly bothersome to Rosenberg. A memory he cited as transformative to his activist mindset occurred while on a train home with an Air Force friend who had traveled with him from England where they were stationed. Upon arrival in Washington, D.C., his friend, an African American, stood up and explained to Rosenberg that he needed to move to a segregated car for Black passengers or they would encounter trouble as they moved farther south. He eventually saw that becoming an attorney and litigating cases involving discrimination would aid his civil rights activism.

== Work in the Civil Rights Division and the Appalachian Research and Defense Fund (AppalReD) ==
Work in the Civil Rights Division focused on legal disputes about voting rights and their constitutional protections. This often resulted in backlash from the Ku Klux Klan, and several suits were brought forward against the use of acts of terror in the voting process. A particular case Rosenberg worked on involved the murder of three voter registration workers, James Chaney, Andrew Goodman, and Michael Schwerner in Neshoba County, Mississippi. His team's victory in that court case was monumental, as the presiding judge on the case routinely sympathized with white supremacist viewpoints. In 1965, with passage of the Voting Rights Act, Rosenberg was involved with filing several suits that worked to enforce the law, including the required removal of poll taxes and literacy tests across the south. Rosenberg stayed at the Civil Rights Division working on similar cases until 1970.

Rosenberg and his wife Jean decided to leave the Civil Rights Division when President Nixon's administration took its focus away from enforcing civil rights legislation. Rosenberg, his wife, and their son Michael were traveling cross country when Rosenberg was informed of the Appalachian Research and Defense Fund, a burgeoning organizational effort in Appalachia that would provide legal representation to those who could not afford or otherwise find representation. This career turn switched Rosenberg's focus largely to environmental law as a gateway to protect people living on land that historically had been exploited. Particularly, the work focus was to represent those in poverty due to the coal economy, recognizing that the “relationship between the coal economy and the incidence of poverty was very direct."

His cases involved defense and reform involving the devastating impact of the extraction industry such as black lung disease and varied forms of environmental devastation. He advocated for mine safety regulations and compensation for workers affected by black lung disease. He rallied against “broad form deeds,” which catered to out of state interests in mineral extraction to the detriment of local communities. He also advocated for enforcing legislation that would regulate surface mining, which would in turn reduce erosion and water pollution.

Cases that Rosenberg directly represented often involved surface mining and the dangers it posed to Appalachian citizens, and frequently he succeeded in having mining licenses revoked. Informed by his experience at the Civil Rights Defense division, Rosenberg was accustomed to massive preparation in going up against big business. He was also very involved in redeveloping an old coal town, David, KY where renters consistently paid their rent but were afforded no reparations to their properties. AppalReD incorporated the David Community and Development Corporation (DCDC) and refinanced homes and sold them to renters, built new low to moderate income homes, created a new water and sewage system, and developed David School, a school for poor children who struggled in the public school system. Rosenberg took a very hands-on approach to lawyering, insisting that it is more than "sitting behind a desk." Such an approach was seen when he had a lawyer dig up a water main and measure its distance in the ground to prove it was too shallow to prevent freezing in the winter, and therefore needed replaced.

Apart from fighting big business, AppalReD represents individuals who cannot afford legal aid otherwise, 70% of whom are women. Cases taken on include family matters, and in the late 1990s there was often difficulty finding lawyers due to Reagan era budget cuts. Therefore, aiding those divorces that involved domestic abuse were prioritized. Budget cuts to legal services has been a continual obstacle faced by AppalReD, but it continues to serve eastern Kentucky.

== Awards and Recognitions ==
Rosenberg has received many awards recognizing his contributions toward bettering the lives of others. In 2004, he received the Lifetime Achievement Award from the American Lawyer Magazine. In 2013 he received both the Kentucky Bar Association Distinguished Lawyer Award and the American Bar Association Difference Makers Award. In April 2015, he received the American Bar Association Grassroots Advocacy Award, and in November of that same year the ACLU of Kentucky honored him for his leadership at AppalReD.
