= Hilton Briggs =

American animal scientist (1913–2001)

Hilton Marshall Briggs (January 9, 1913 – November 23, 2001) was an American animal scientist, educator and college administrator.

== Biography ==
He was born in Cairo, Iowa, to John Weaver and Ethel (Marshall) Briggs. He attended Iowa State University where he received a B.S. in Animal Science (1933), followed by a master's degree from North Dakota State University (1935) and a Ph.D. from Cornell University.

He joined the Animal Science faculty at Oklahoma State University in 1936 and later was a Professor and Associate Dean of College of Agriculture and Associate Director of Agricultural Experiment Station. From 1950 to 1958, he served as Dean of Agriculture and Director of Agricultural Experiment Station at the University of Wyoming in Laramie.

=== Presidency at South Dakota State ===
He was selected as the 13th president of South Dakota State University in 1958 and served in that post until 1975. His 17 years as president of SDSU was marked by growth. Enrollment more than doubled from 3,800 to 8,000 and sixty-five percent of the square footage on the current campus was built during his tenure. Honors bestowed on him included Fellow in the American Society of Animal Science, Fellow in the American Association for the Advancement of Science, Decoration for the Distinguished Civilian Service by the Department of the Army, Exceptional Service Award by the U.S. Air Force. Hilton M. Briggs Library at South Dakota State University was dedicated in his honor. North Dakota State University and the University of South Dakota each awarded him an Honorary Doctorate.
