= Michael S. Wald =

American lawyer

Michael S. Wald is an American lawyer currently the Jackson Eli Reynolds Professor of Law, Emeritus at Stanford Law School and an Elected Fellow of the American Law Institute.

== Education ==
- BA Cornell University 1963
- MA (political science) Yale University Graduate School of Arts and Sciences
- LLB Yale Law School 1967
