= Cornelius C. Kubler =

- Traditional Chinese: 顧百里
- Simplified Chinese: 顾百里
Transcriptions
Standard Mandarin
- Hanyu Pinyin: Gù Bǎilǐ
- Bopomofo: ㄍㄨˋ ㄅㄞˇ ㄌㄧˇ
- Gwoyeu Romatzyh: Guh Baelii
- Wade–Giles: Ku^{4} Pai^{3}-li^{3}
- Tongyong Pinyin: Gù Bǎilǐ
- IPA: [kû pǎɪ.lì]

Cornelius C. Kubler (also known as Neil Kubler) is an academic in the disciplines of Chinese Linguistics and Chinese Language Pedagogy, an expert in Chinese dialects, and a polyglot who speaks twelve languages including English, German, Mandarin, Taiwanese, Cantonese and Japanese. He is the Stanfield Professor of Asian Studies at Williams College, former American Co-Director of the Johns Hopkins University-Nanjing University Center for Chinese and American Studies in Nanjing, China, and a former American diplomat.

== Biography ==
Neil Kubler earned his undergraduate, master's and Ph.D. degrees in linguistics from Cornell University, writing his dissertation on the development and use of Taiwanese Mandarin, a subject he continues to research and write about. He earned a second master's degree in Chinese literature from National Taiwan University.

Kubler worked at the U.S. Department of State's Foreign Service Institute from 1980 to 1991, during which time, he served as Language Training Supervisor over Mandarin, Cantonese, Japanese and Mongolian. He also served as Principal of the advanced Chinese field school based in Taipei and as Chair of the Department of Asian and African Languages.

In 1991, he accepted an appointment as chair of the then Chinese and Asian Studies Program at Williams College, going on to chair the Department of Asian Studies, which he was instrumental in founding.

Kubler's other teaching appointments include at Eisenhower College, Portland State University, Middlebury College, National Taiwan Normal University, and the Chinese University of Hong Kong.

Over the course of his career, he has authored or coauthored more than 15 books and more than 50 articles on Chinese language pedagogy and linguistics. He is a frequent reviewer and consultant for Chinese and Asian Studies programs in the U.S. and abroad. He has served as Chair of the Test Development Committee for the SAT Subject Test in Chinese and as member of the Executive Committee of the Association of Departments of Foreign Languages of the Modern Language Association.

Kubler served as 2014-2016 American Co-Director of the Hopkins–Nanjing Center, where he oversaw the 30th anniversary of the graduate center in 2016. During his tenure there, he also taught courses in Classical Chinese.

== Selected works ==
- Basic Mandarin Chinese: Reading & Writing (Tuttle Publishing, 2017)
- Intermediate Written Chinese 进阶中文读与写 (Tuttle Publishing, 2015)
- 500 Common Chinese Idioms: An Annotated Frequency Dictionary 成语五百条, ed. (Routledge, 2011)
- What Works: Helping Students Reach Native-Like Second-Language Competence [authorial collective, with Betty Lou Leaver et al.] (Coalition of Distinguished Language Centers, MSI Press, 2008)
- Listening Comprehension in Chinese: Performing 'Comic Dialogs' 說相聲 (Far Eastern Publications, Yale

University, 1995)

- Read Chinese Signs 中文路標與招牌的認識 [with Hsiaojung Sharon L. Chi] (Cheng & Tsui Company, 1993)
