= Marc P. Christensen =

American college president (born 1971)

Marc P. Clarkson
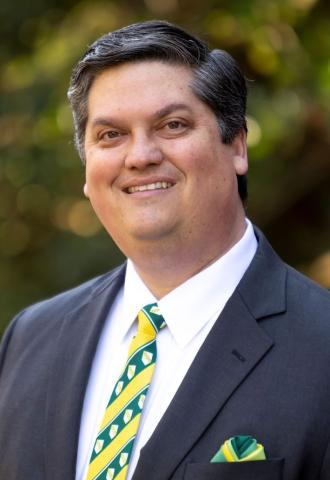
- Christensen in 2022

17th President of Clarkson University
- In office July 1, 2022 - July 22, 2024
- Succeeded by: David K. Heacock (acting)
- Preceded by: Anthony G. Collins

Personal details
- Born: 1971 (age 54–55)
- Spouse: Seema Christensen
- Education: George Mason University (M.S., Ph.D.); Cornell University (B.S.)
- Scientific career
- Fields: electrical engineering
- Workplaces: Southern Methodist University; Clarkson University
- Thesis: Multi -chip global free -space optical interconnections: Scaling, embedding, design, and implementation (2001)
- Doctoral advisor: Michael W. Haney

Marc P. Christensen is an American engineer and academic who served as the 17th president of Clarkson University in Potsdam, New York.

== Early life, education, and career ==
Christensen earned his Bachelor of Science degree in engineering physics from Cornell University, and his Master of Science in electrical engineering and Ph.D. in electrical and computer engineering from George Mason University.

Early in his academic career, Christensen was identified by the Defense Advanced Research Projects Agency (DARPA) as a "rising star in microsystems research." He began his professional career as a technical leader in BDM's Sensors and Photonics Group, now part of Northrop Grumman Mission Systems. His work ranged from developing optical signal processing and VCSEL-based optical interconnection architectures, to infrared sensor modeling, simulation, and analysis. In 1997, he co-founded Applied Photonics, an optical interconnection company that provided hardware demonstrations for multiple DARPA programs.

In 2002, he joined Southern Methodist University where he rose through the ranks and served as the department chair of Electrical Engineering from 2007 to 2012 and Dean of the Lyle School of Engineering from 2012 to 2022.

In 2008, Christensen was recognized for outstanding research with the Gerald J. Ford Research Fellowship. In 2010, he was selected as the inaugural Bobby B. Lyle Professor of Engineering Innovation. In 2011, he was recognized for outstanding and innovative teaching as a recipient of the Altshuler Distinguished Teaching Professor Award.

Christensen is a leader in photonics research and technology development and holds 10 U.S. patents.

== Clarkson University ==
The Clarkson University Board of Trustees appointed Christensen to serve as the 17th President of Clarkson University, effective July 1, 2022. Christensen and his wife, Seema Christensen, took up residence in Foster House on the Clarkson University campus in summer 2022. Christensen resigned from the position in July 2024 for personal reasons.
