= Dennis A. Rondinelli =

Dennis A. Rondinelli (March 30, 1943 – March 7, 2007) was a professor and researcher of public administration.

Rondinelli was born in Trenton, New Jersey, and he received his B.A. from Rutgers University in 1965 and his Ph.D. from Cornell University in 1969. He worked at the University of North Carolina at Chapel Hill for 15 years before joining Duke University at the Sanford School of Public Policy in 2005.

== Bibliography ==
- Development administration and U.S. foreign aid policy, Boulder : L. Rienner Publishers, 1987
- Planning Education Reforms in Developing Countries: The Contingency Approach, John Middleton, Adriaan M. Verspoor; Duke University Press, 1990
- Development projects as policy experiments. An adaptive approach to development administration, Routledge, London and New York, 1993.
- Privatization and Economic Reform in Central Europe: The Changing Business Climate, Quorum Books, 1994
- Expanding Sino-American Business and Trade: China's Economic Transition, Quorum Books, 1994
- Great Policies: Strategic Innovations in Asia and the Pacific Basin, John D. Montgomery, Praeger, 1995
