= Earl Rogers Sayers =

Earl Rogers Sayers was an American professor of biology and college administrator. He was educated at University of Illinois with a bachelor's degree in 1958. He later received a master's degree in 1961 and a Ph.D. in 1964 from Cornell University. He served as president of the University of Alabama from 1988 to 1996.
