= Roger Corbett =

Australian businessman

Roger Corbett AO
- Born: Roger Campbell Corbett; 6 September 1942 (age 84)
- Education: Shore School; UNSW Sydney
- Occupation: Businessman
- Political party: Liberal

Roger Campbell Corbett AO (born 6 September 1942) is an Australian businessman. From January 1999 to September 2006, Corbett was CEO of the Woolworths conglomerate.

== Career ==
Educated at Shore School, Corbett graduated from UNSW Sydney with a Bachelor of Commerce.

In 2003, Corbett was appointed a Member of the Order of Australia (AM) for service to the retail industry, particularly as a contributor to the development of industry policy and standards, and to the community, he was awarded an honorary doctorate from Charles Sturt University the same year. In 2008, he was promoted to an officer of the Order of Australia (AO) for service to business, particularly through leadership and executive roles in the retail sector and a range of allied organisations, and to the community. He is also a member of the Liberal Party of Australia and is president of its Warringah branch.

== Personal life ==
Corbett is married and has three children. He is a committed Christian.
