= Hopkins–Nanjing Center =

US–China graduate center in Nanjing

The Johns Hopkins University– Nanjing University Center for Chinese and American Studies
- 南京大学—约翰斯·霍普金斯大学 中美文化研究中心
- Type: Private
- Established: 1986
- Academic affiliations: Johns Hopkins University; Nanjing University
- Director: Adam K. Webb; Li Xiaorong
- Postgraduates: 175
- Location: Nanjing, China
- Website: hnc.nju.edu.cn sais.jhu.edu

The Hopkins–Nanjing Center (HNC; Chinese: 中美中心), formally the Johns Hopkins University–Nanjing University Center for Chinese and American Studies (Chinese: 南京大学—约翰斯·霍普金斯大学中美文化研究中心), is an international campus of the Paul H. Nitze School of Advanced International Studies and a joint educational venture between Johns Hopkins University and Nanjing University that opened in Nanjing, China, in 1986. Former Hopkins President Steven Muller and former NJU President Kuang Yaming worked together to create the center, recognizing the importance of improved understanding and relations between their respective countries. Muller believed China to be "the country of the future."

== History ==
In 1981, Steven Muller, then the president of Johns Hopkins University, conceived of the HNC as a legacy of his presidency, and as an opportunity for JHU to be the first American university to establish a formal presence in China. Nanjing University was chosen as a partner because of its prestige, as one of the best universities in China, because of its location, and because of its willingness to devote resources to the center. After breaking ground in 1984, the HNC officially opened in 1986, and has operated continuously since, even during tumultuous periods like the 1989 Tiananmen Square Protests and the 2003 SARS crisis. In the latter case, the program was shifted to a temporary location in Hawaii for the duration of the outbreak. In 2006, the HNC underwent a considerable expansion, overseen by then HNC American co-director Robert Daly (director), adding a large new building to complete the compound. The COVID-19 pandemic saw the HNC shift to virtual course delivery in March 2020. In fall 2020, students were offered the option of relocating to The Johns Hopkins University SAIS Europe campus in Bologna, Italy, for an in-person community while continuing to take HNC virtual courses. After the shift to virtual delivery in March 2020, virtual delivery has continued. However, by September 2022, a limited number of international students were granted visas, and by fall 2023, normal operations fully resumed.

In recent years, the HNC has strengthened integration with the other SAIS campuses in Washington, DC and Bologna, Italy.

== Mission ==
The mission of the Hopkins–Nanjing Center is "to develop and train professionals to provide leadership in managing successful bilateral and multilateral relationships involving China and the West in an increasingly complex international environment." In the early years of the HNC, one long-term vision was that one day, the United States Secretary of State and the Foreign Minister of the People's Republic of China would discover that they were both graduates of the HNC.

== Academics ==
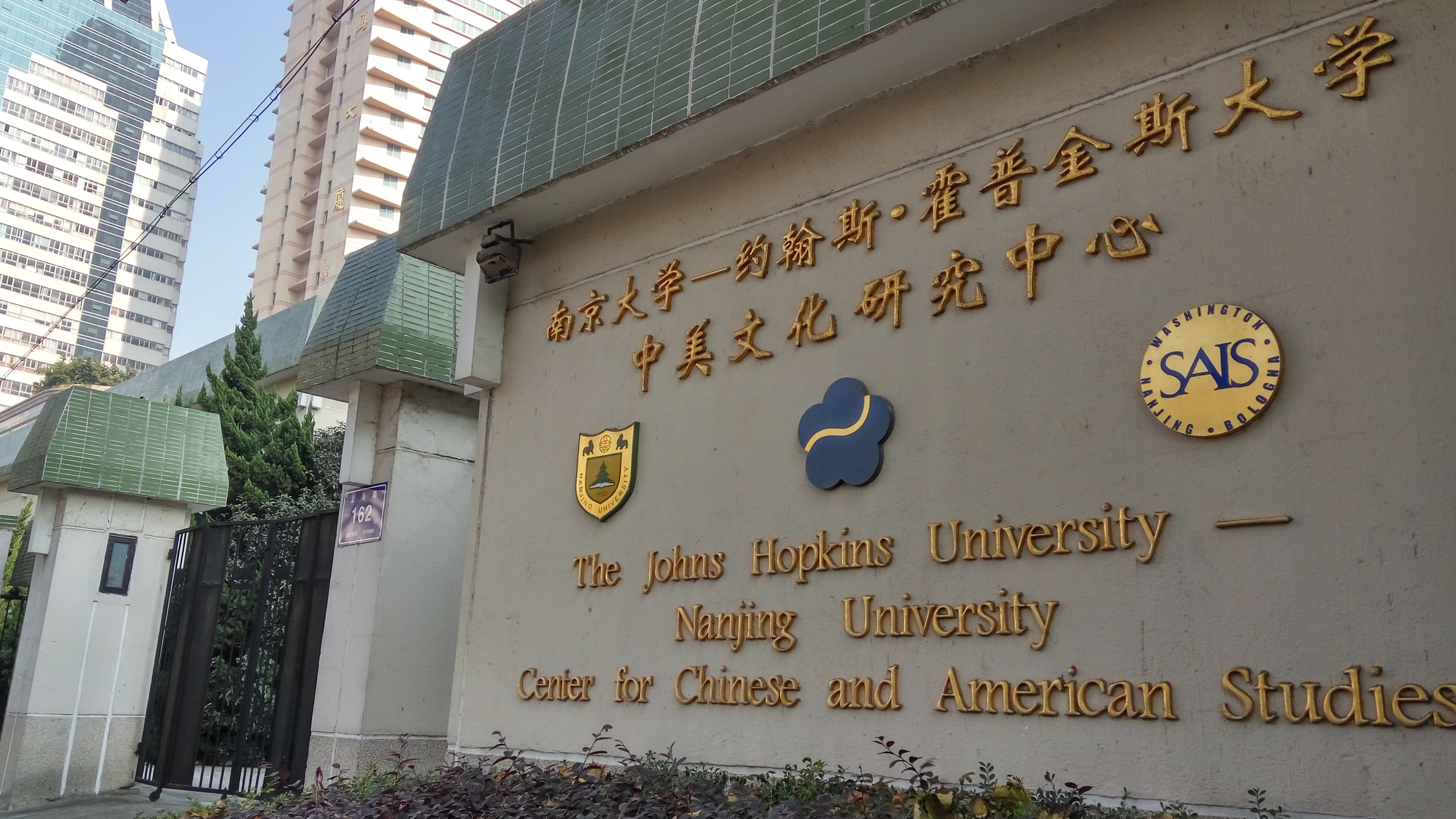
The west gate of the Hopkins-Nanjing Center, facing Shanghai Road in Nanjing.

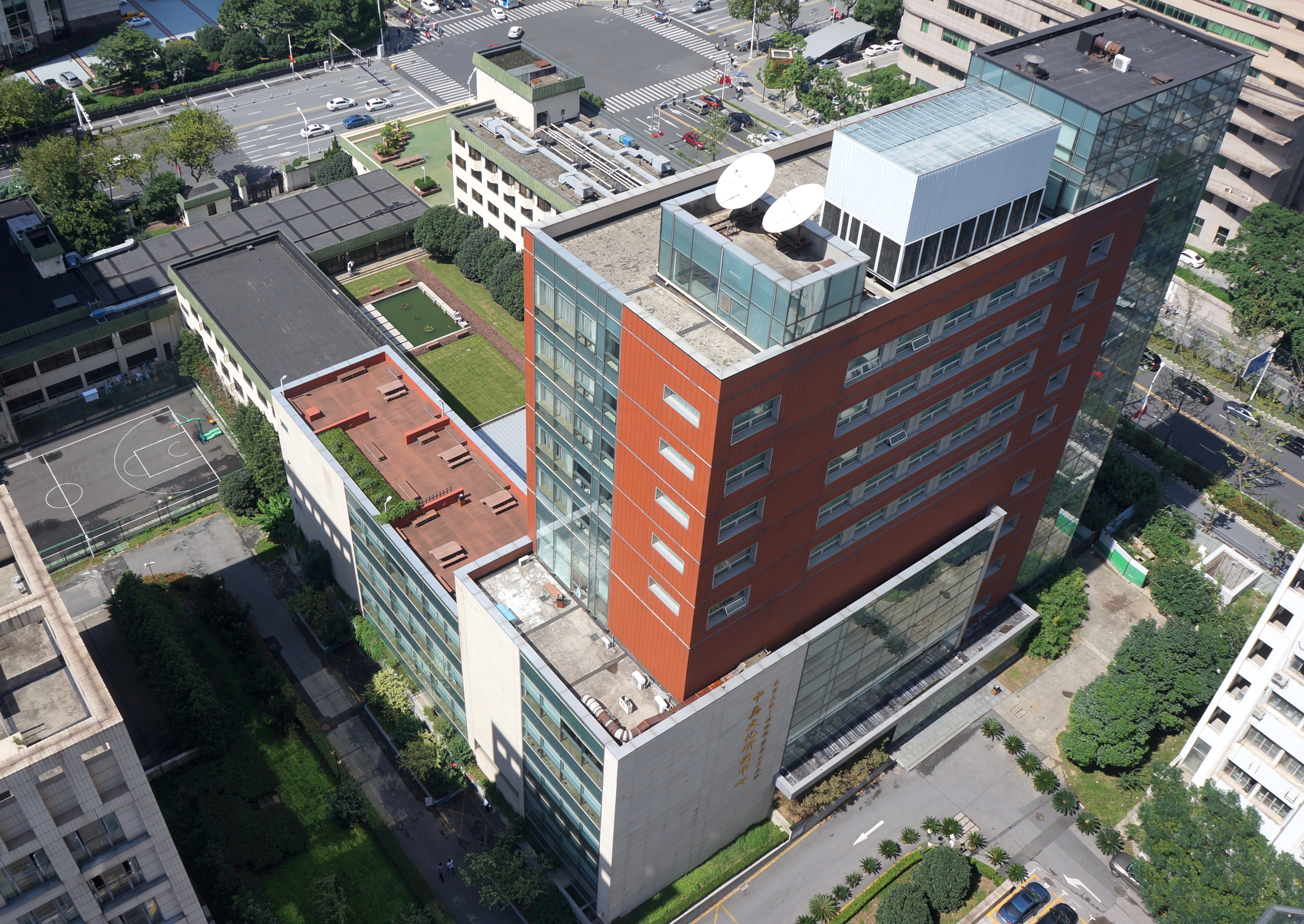
Aerial view of the Hopkins-Nanjing complex.

The HNC integrates a graduate-level academic program with the opportunity for deep cultural engagement. Students benefit from modern facilities, such as the only uncensored, open-stacks library in China, offering both English and Chinese collections totaling 120,000 volumes. Full academic freedom is guaranteed in the center's founding documents, however, this guarantee has been questioned by many students in recent years. For example, the Chinese administration previously blocked American students from starting an academic journal, a common fixture of top ranked graduate programs.

The HNC is the only institution of its kind that is fully bilingual, English and Chinese, in its academic programs. All students must have advanced proficiency in both languages. A strong “target language” component requires students to take a substantial number of courses in their target language and, if writing a thesis, to write and defend it in their target language (English for Chinese students and Chinese for international students). Chinese faculty teach primarily in Chinese and international faculty in English. Most classes have a mix of Chinese and international students, and some co-taught classes are fully bilingual.

== Students ==
The student body at the center is composed of approximately 50% Chinese citizens and 50% international students. Chinese students are admitted through Nanjing University, while international students are admitted through Johns Hopkins University, though both are considered fully students of both universities at the same time. The international population is made up largely of Americans but includes individuals from all over the world. Many students hold undergraduate degrees with a Chinese or East Asian Studies component. Some also hold advanced degrees prior to attending the Hopkins–Nanjing Center.

== Programs of Study ==
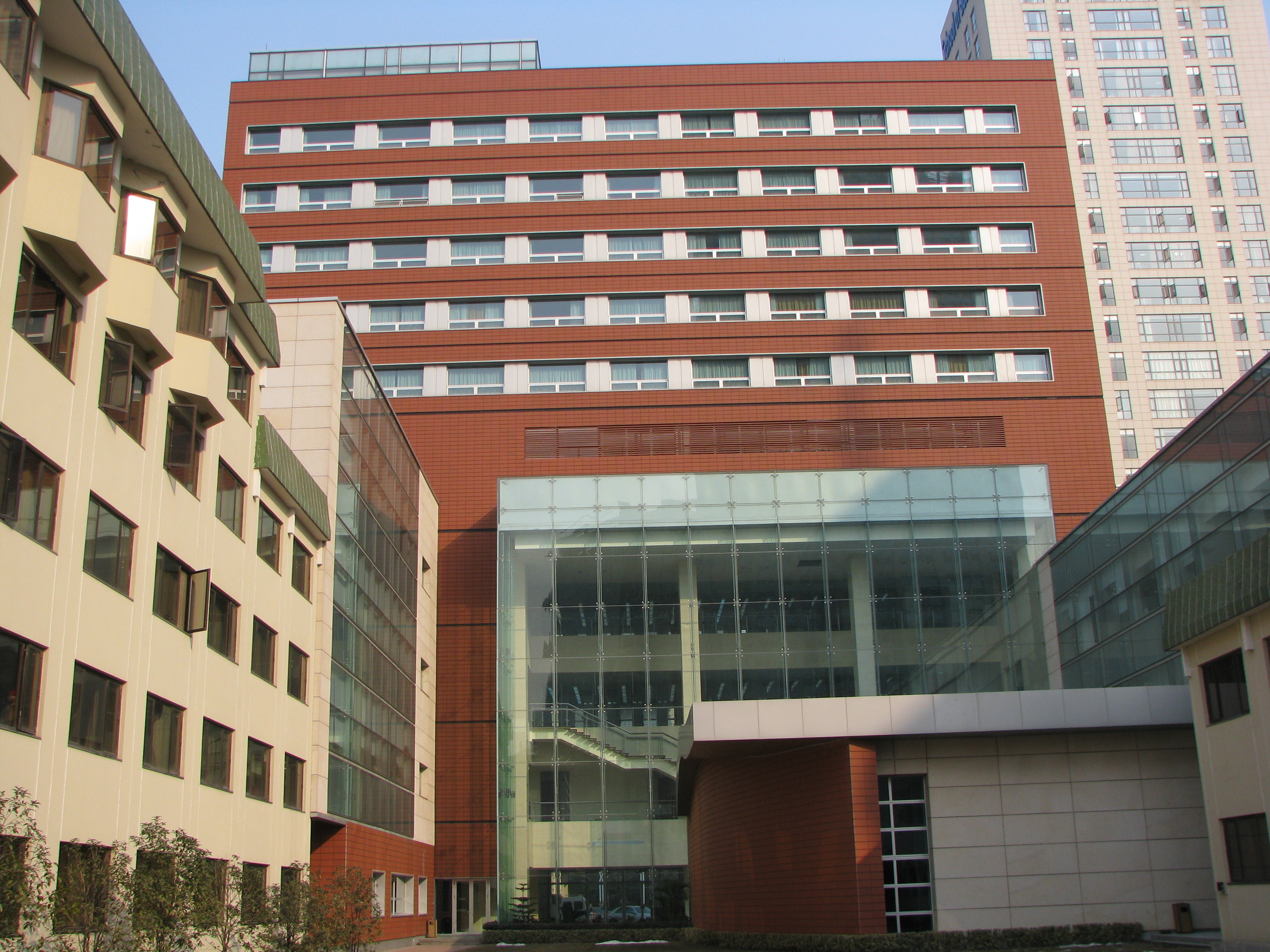
The Sam Pollard building houses the center's library and academic classrooms.

The Hopkins–Nanjing Center offers two distinct academic programs: a two-year Master of Arts in international studies and a one-year graduate Certificate program. Both credentials are issued jointly by Johns Hopkins University and Nanjing University and are recognized in the United States and China. The Certificate can be combined with further master's study at campuses of the School of Advanced International Studies in Washington, DC or Bologna, Italy.

=== HNC Certificate in Chinese and American Studies ===
The one-year certificate gives students flexibility in course selection while deepening their knowledge of Sino-global relations. Graduate-level courses on topics such as Chinese studies, energy, economics, and law help students advance their research and language skills while gaining the multidisciplinary background needed in today's global workforce. The certificate is jointly awarded by Johns Hopkins SAIS and Nanjing University.

=== Master of Arts in international studies (MAIS) ===
This two-year master's program with a thesis component is the first master's degree to be fully accredited in both China and the United States. Thesis topics reflect diverse course offerings and have covered areas ranging from women's rights in China to Chinese soft power.

=== HNC Certificate + Johns Hopkins SAIS MA in International Relations (MAIR) ===
After completing the one-year certificate in Chinese and American studies, students continue their studies to complete the Master of Arts in international relations degree from Johns Hopkins. The program's interdisciplinary coursework emphasizes international economics, geopolitics, data analysis, quantitative methods, decision-making, and policy studies. Students receive a jointly awarded certificate from Johns Hopkins SAIS and Nanjing University, and a Master of Arts in international relations from Johns Hopkins SAIS. At least one semester of the degree must be completed in Washington, DC.

=== HNC Certificate + Johns Hopkins SAIS Master of Arts in International Affairs (MAIA) ===
Students in this research-focused program complete the certificate in Nanjing and continue their studies for one year at SAIS Europe in Bologna, Italy. Students personalize the curriculum to their professional interests and focus on contemporary issues in international affairs. Graduates receive a jointly awarded certificate from Johns Hopkins SAIS and Nanjing University, and a Master of Arts in international affairs from Johns Hopkins SAIS.

== Notable alumni ==
- Rosemary Gallant, '87, minister counselor for commercial affairs at the US Embassy in London
- David B. Shear '87, former US ambassador to Vietnam
- Chen Deming '88, former Chinese minister of commerce
- Brian Linden '88, author and co-founder of the Linden Centre
- James Heller ‘92, consul general, US consulate General Shanghai
- Anthony Kuhn '92, National Public Radio correspondent in Seoul, South Korea; Former NPR correspondent in Beijing, China
- Hua Xinghong '93, managing director-China, Lone Star Funds
- Amy Celico '94 Principle at Albright Stonebridge Group; former senior director for China affairs at the Office of the U.S. Trade Representative
- Julia Lovell '98, author, translator, and professor of modern Chinese history and literature, University of London
- Margaret Myers '11, director of the Asia & Latin American Program, Inter-American Dialogue
- Slater Rhea '17, American entertainer and TV personality in China

== Former Faculty ==
- Barry Sautman (1991-1992), Professor Emeritus/Visiting Professor Hong Kong University of Science and Technology Division of Social Science

== See also ==
- Paul H. Nitze School of Advanced International Studies
- Johns Hopkins University
- Nanjing University
- Nanjing
- SAIS Bologna Center
