= Hayford (crater) =

Crater on the Moon

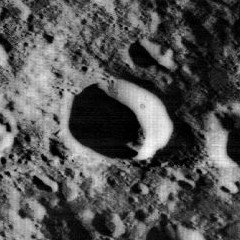
- Lunar Orbiter 2 image
- Coordinates: 12.7°N 176.4°W
- Diameter: 27 km
- Depth: Unknown
- Colongitude: 177° at sunrise
- Eponym: John F. Hayford

Hayford is a lunar impact crater on the Moon's far side. It is a relatively isolated feature with the nearest named crater being Krasovskiy, some 300 km due south. Hayford has a well-defined edge that is not significantly eroded. The inner walls slope directly down to the floor, with little slumping or terrace formation. The infrared spectrum of pure crystalline plagioclase has been identified on the northwest wall. The interior floor is relatively featureless.

== Satellite craters ==
By convention these features are identified on lunar maps by placing the letter on the side of the crater midpoint that is closest to Hayford.

Hayford	Latitude	Longitude	Diameter
E	13.5° N	172.1° W	21 km
K	9.6° N	174.2° W	26 km
L	8.2° N	175.9° W	16 km
P	11.1° N	177.6° W	21 km
T	13.3° N	179.5° E	31 km
U	14.0° N	179.9° E	21 km
