= William Fremont Blackman =

Fourth president of Rollins College

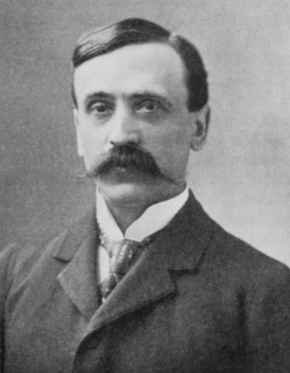
- Born: September 26, 1855; North Pitcher, New York, US
- Died: August 9, 1932 (aged 76); Winter Park, Florida, US
- Education: Oberlin College; Yale University; Cornell University
- Occupation: Academic

William Fremont Blackman (1855–1932) was the fourth president of Rollins College from 1902 to 1915.

== Biography ==
William Fremont Blackman was born on September 26, 1855, in North Pitcher, New York. He attended Oberlin College with a Bachelor of Arts in 1877. He went on to earn a Bachelor of Divinity degree from Yale University in 1880 and his Ph.D. from Cornell University in 1893. He did further studies at the Berlin University (Royal Statistical Bureau, 1893) and the College de France in Paris (1894).

Before he joined Yale as Professor of Christian Ethics in 1893, he held pastorates at congregational churches in Steubenville, Ohio, Naugatuck, Connecticut, and Ithaca, New York. While at Yale he lectured on social philosophy and ethics, and served as editor of the Yale Review. He was appointed as President of Rollins College in 1902.

He received an honorary Doctor of Laws degree in 1910 from the University of Florida. He died at his home in Winter Park, Florida on August 9, 1932.
