= Roger B. Corbett =

American academic

Roger B. Corbett (1900 - January 25, 1984) was an American academic and college administrator who served as President of New Mexico State University (NMSU) from 1955 to 1970. He was born in Morgantown, W.Va. and was educated at Cornell University, receiving his B.S., M.S., and Ph.D. degrees from the same institution.

Prior to his appointment as NMSU's president in 1955, he taught at Rhode Island College, and served as dean of the College of Agriculture at the University of Connecticut and Director of the University of Maryland’s Agricultural Experiment Station. He also was a senior economist for the United States Department of Agriculture, secretary-treasurer of the American Farm Bureau Federation and executive secretary of the New England Research Council. During his tenure at NMSU, New Mexico A&M became New Mexico State University.
