= John R. Rosenberg =

John R. Rosenberg (born 1956) is currently the Washington Irving Professor of Spanish and American Relations at Brigham Young University (BYU).

Rosenberg holds bachelor's and master's degrees from BYU and master's and PhD degrees from Cornell University.

Rosenberg joined the faculty of BYU in 1985. He was chair of BYU's Department of Spanish and Portuguese from 1993 to 1997. From 1997 to 2005 Rosenberg was associate dean of BYU's College of Humanities. when he succeeded Van C. Gessel as dean. He succeeded Van C. Gessel as the college's dean in 2005 and served in that role until 2015. In addition to being in a named professorial chair, he is also a senior fellow with BYU's Public-school partnership and associate director of BYU's faculty center where he oversees the training of academic administrators. His literary work has mainly focused on Spanish literature. His earliest work involving adding psychology to the study of Cervantes work Don Quijote. He has also written on Spanish Romanticism. Starting with his work at Cornell Rosenberg has mainly focused on literary productions in Spain since 1800, both in the 19th and 20th centuries. He has also studied the literature of Equatorial Guinea.

He has worked with the Seattle, Washington-based Institute for Educational Inquiry. He has not only taught classes on literature of Spain, but also on the foreign relations of Spain, Venezuela and Mexico.

Rosenberg is a member of the Church of Jesus Christ of Latter-day Saints (LDS Church). He served as a missionary for the LDS Church from 1975 to 1977 in Venezuela. Among other positions in the LDS Church, Rosenberg has served as a bishop.

In 2018, Rosenberg was one of four finalists to be the next president of Utah Valley University, with Astrid S. Tuminez eventually being chosen as the new president.

== Sources ==
- Deseret News article with section on Rosenberg
- Daily Herald article on Rosenberg
