= John Fillmore Hayford =

American geodesist (1868–1925)

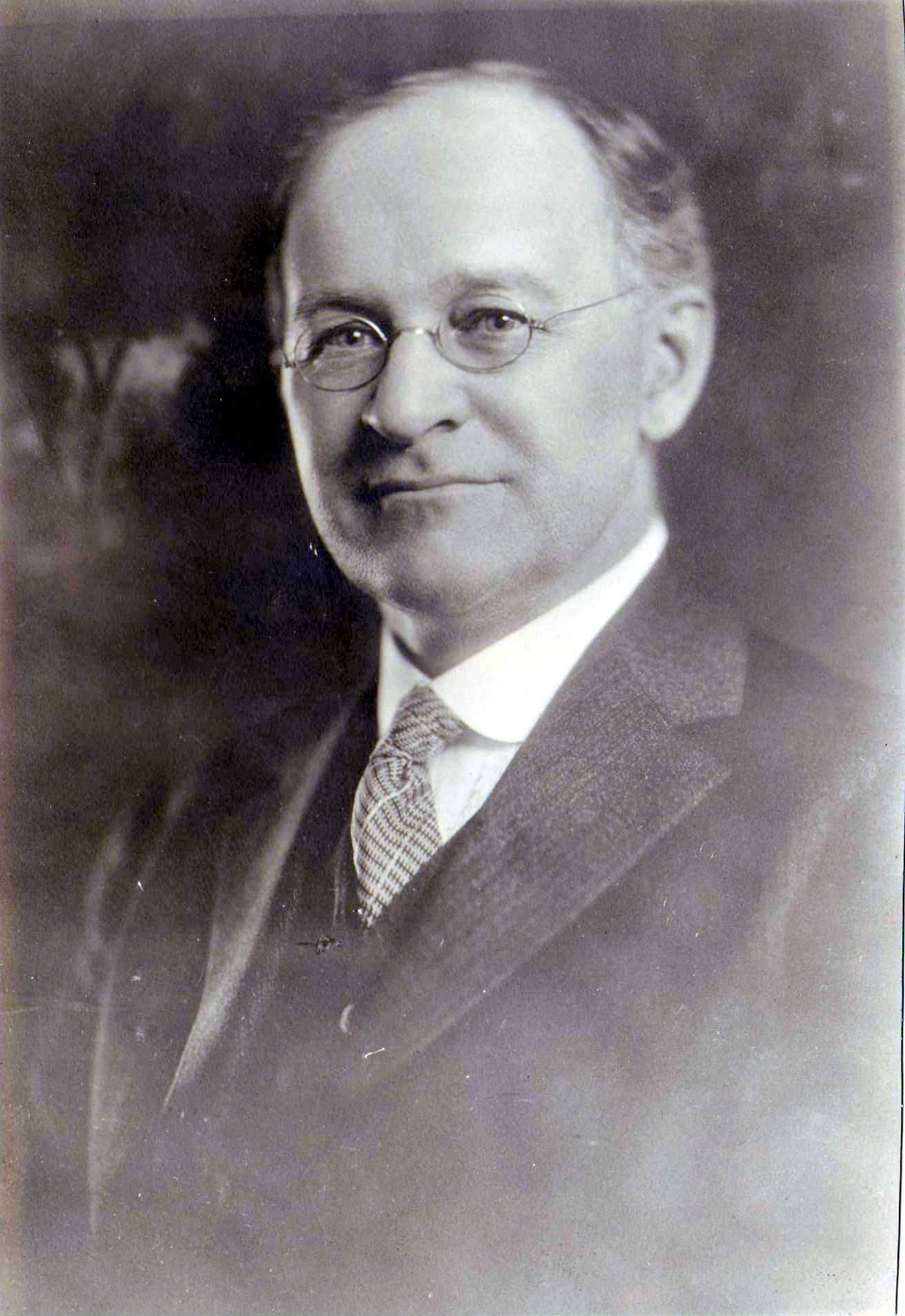
- Born: May 19, 1868; Rouses Point, New York
- Died: March 10, 1925 (aged 56); Evanston, Illinois, U.S.
- Education: Cornell University College of Engineering
- Known for: Isostasy
- Children: 4, including Phyllis Hayford Hutchings
- Awards: Honorary doctorate from George Washington University 1918; Victoria Medal of the Royal Geographical Society 1924
- Scientific career
- Fields: Geodesy
- Workplaces: United States Coast and Geodetic Survey; Northwestern University, College of Engineering

John Fillmore Hayford (May 19, 1868 – March 10, 1925) was an eminent United States geodesist. His work involved the study of isostasy and the construction of a reference ellipsoid for approximating the figure of the Earth. Hayford was elected to the United States National Academy of Sciences in 1911 and the American Philosophical Society in 1915. The crater Hayford on the far side of the Moon is named after him. Mount Hayford, a 1,871 m mountain peak near Metlakatla, Alaska, United States, is named after him. A biography of Hayford may be found in the Biographical Memoirs of the National Academy of Sciences, 16 (5), 1935.

== See also ==
- Hayford ellipsoid

== Bibliography ==
- Hayford, JF (1917), "Gravity and Isostasy.", Science, 45 (1163) (published Apr 13, 1917): 350–354, doi:10.1126/science.45.1163.350, PMID 17795741
- Hayford, JF (1911), "The American Association for the Advancement of Science the Relations of Isostasy to Geodesy, Geophysics and Geology.", Science, 33 (841) (published Feb 10, 1911): 199–208, doi:10.1126/science.33.841.199, PMID 17815861
- Hayford, JF (1909), "The New College of Engineering, an Opportunity.", Science, 29 (753) (published Jun 4, 1909): 887–891, doi:10.1126/science.29.753.887, PMID 17817509
- Hayford, JF (1907), "Report of the General Secretary.", Science, vol. 25, no. 628 (published Jan 11, 1907), pp. 46–50, doi:10.1126/science.25.628.46, PMID 17771974
- Tittmann, OH; Hayford, JF (1906), "The Budapest Conference of the International Geodetic Association.", Science, 24 (623) (published Dec 7, 1906): 713–719, doi:10.1126/science.24.623.713, PMID 17836523
- Hayford, JF (1906), "Report of the General Secretary.", Science, 24 (602) (published Jul 13, 1906): 33–40, doi:10.1126/science.24.602.33, PMID 17811031
- Hayford, JF (1905), "A Connection by Precise Leveling Between the Atlantic and Pacific Oceans.", Science, 21 (539) (published Apr 28, 1905): 673–674, doi:10.1126/science.21.539.673, PMID 17789796
- Hayford, JF (1903), "The Longitude of Honolulu, Various Determinations, 1555-1903.", Science, 18 (462) (published Nov 6, 1903): 589–593, doi:10.1126/science.18.462.589, PMID 17812559
- Hayford, JF (1901), "A New Connection Between the Gravity Measures of Europe and of the United States.", Science, 13 (330) (published Apr 26, 1901): 654–655, doi:10.1126/science.13.330.654, PMID 17808951
- Hayford, JF (1901), "Recent Progress in Geodesy.", Science, 13 (323) (published Mar 8, 1901): 381–383, doi:10.1126/science.13.323.381, PMID 17801118
- Hayford, JF (1900), "Recent Progress in Geodesy.", Science, vol. 11, no. 271 (published Mar 9, 1900), pp. 369–374, doi:10.1126/science.11.271.369, PMID 17768837
- Hayford, JF (1899), "Section A--Astronomy and Mathematics.", Science, 10 (245) (published Sep 8, 1899): 331–333, doi:10.1126/science.10.245.331, PMID 17790921
- Hayford, JF (1898), "The Limitations of the Present Solution of the Tidal Problem.", Science, vol. 8, no. 206 (published Dec 9, 1898), pp. 810–814, doi:10.1126/science.8.206.810, PMID 17754918
