= Beggar's lice =

Beggar's lice is a common name for several species of plants and may refer to:

- Hackelia virginiana
- Species of the genus Desmodium
- Species of the genus Hylodesmum
  - Hylodesmum glutinosum, native to North America
- Species of the genus Torilis
  - Torilis arvensis, invasive in North America
