= Daisy fleabane =

Daisy fleabane is a common name for several species in the genus Erigeron:

- Erigeron annuus, the eastern daisy fleabane
- Erigeron bellidiastrum, the western daisy fleabane
- Erigeron strigosus, the prairie fleabane
