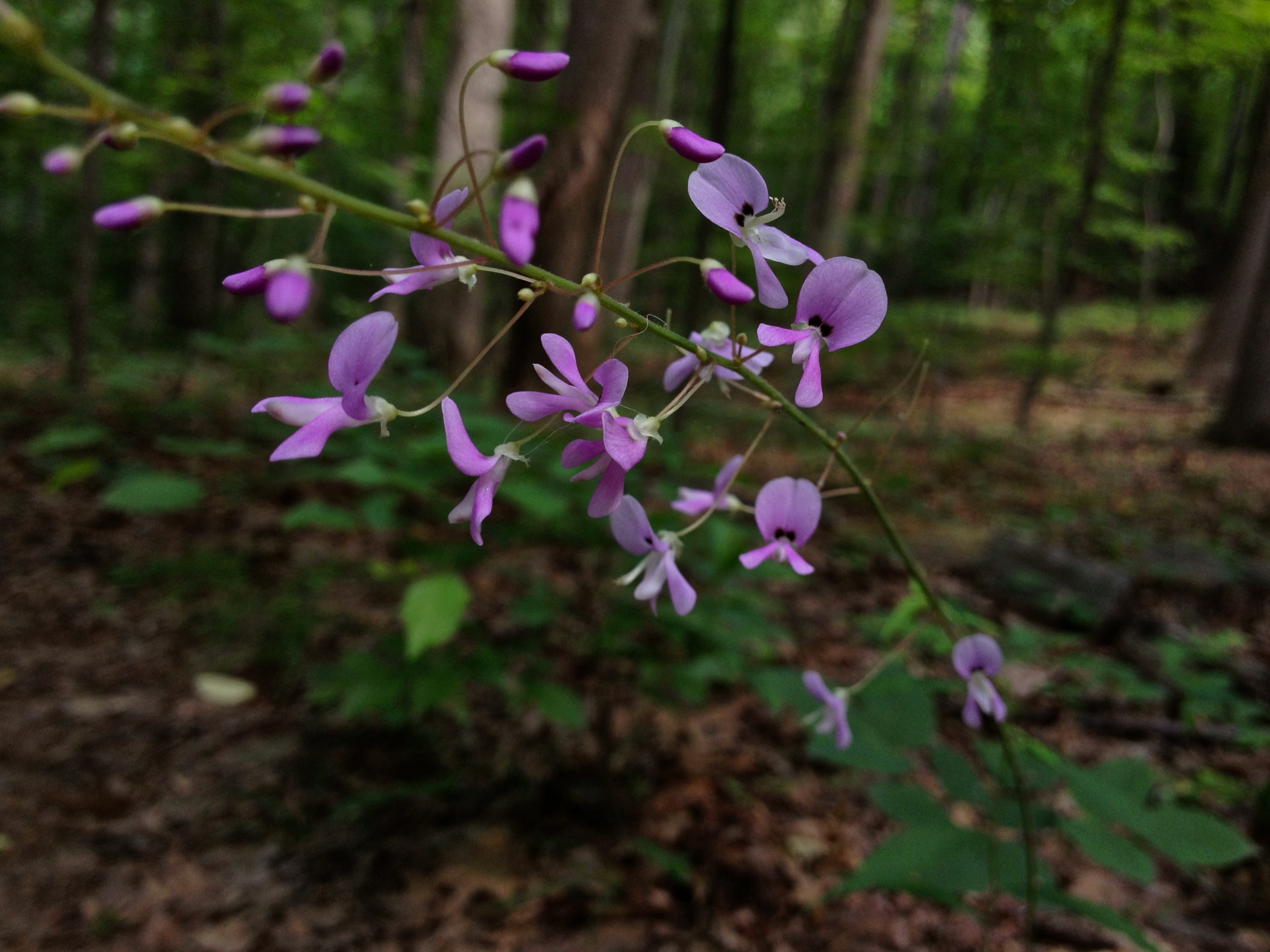
- In Scott's Run Nature Preserve, Virginia
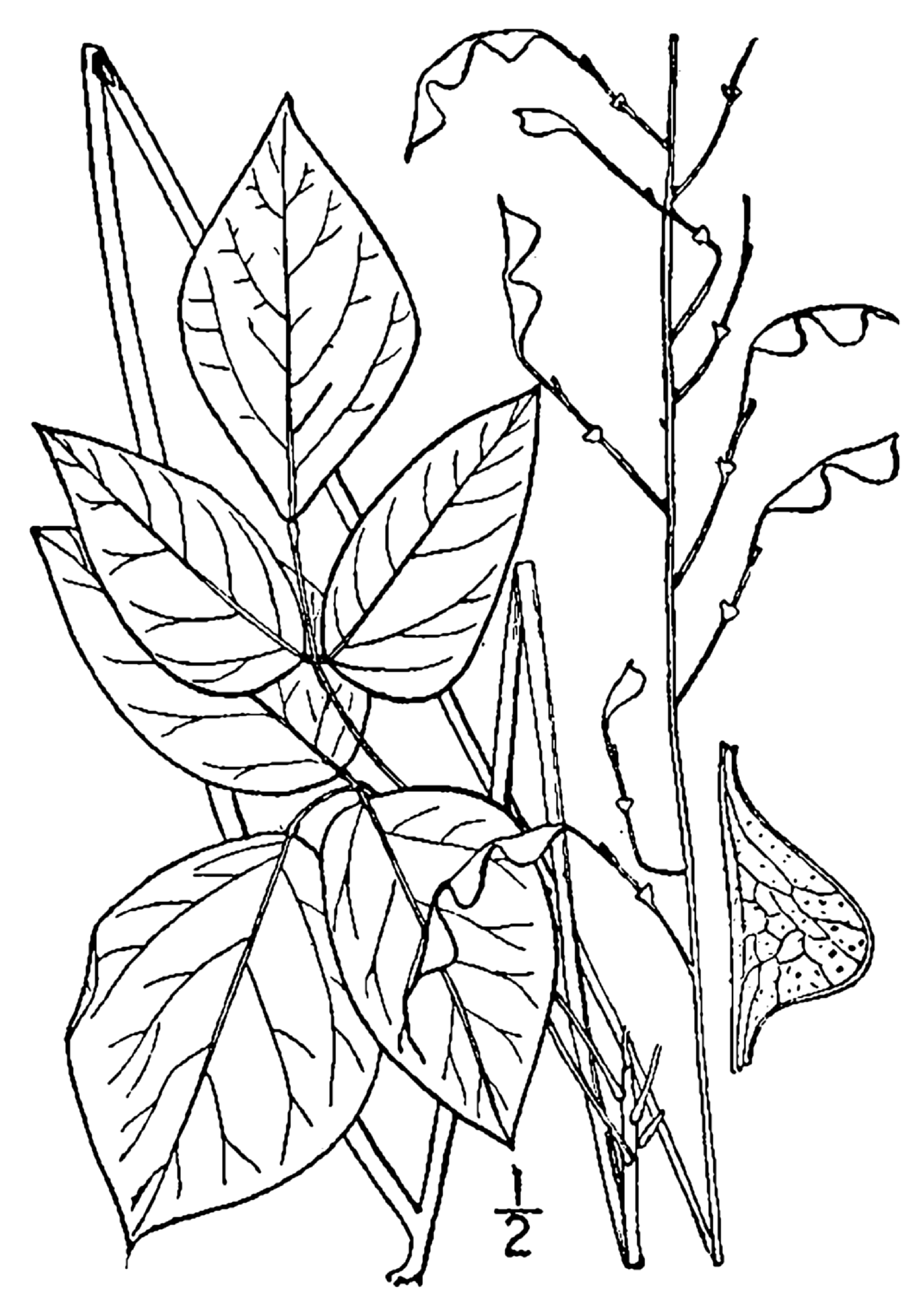
- Botanical illustration

Conservation status
- Secure (NatureServe)

Scientific classification
- Kingdom: Plantae
- Clade: Embryophytes
- Clade: Tracheophytes
- Clade: Spermatophytes
- Clade: Angiosperms
- Clade: Eudicots
- Clade: Rosids
- Order: Fabales
- Family: Fabaceae
- Subfamily: Faboideae
- Genus: Hylodesmum
- Species: H. nudiflorum

Binomial name
- Hylodesmum nudiflorum (L.) H.Ohashi & R.R.Mill

Synonyms
- List: Desmodium nudiflorum DC.; Desmodium nudiflorum f. dudleyi (House) Fassett; Desmodium nudiflorum f. foliolatum (Farw.) Fassett; Desmodium nudiflorum f. personatum Fassett; Hedysarum nudiflorum L.; Meibomia nudiflora Kuntze; Meibomia nudiflora f. dudleyi House; Meibomia nudiflora f. foliolata Farw.; Pleurolobus nudiflorus (DC.) MacMill.

= Hylodesmum nudiflorum =

Species of plant

Hylodesmum nudiflorum (syn. Desmodium nudiflorum), the naked-flowered tick trefoil, panicled leaf tick trefoil or stemless tick trefoil, is a species of flowering plant in the family Fabaceae, native to eastern North America. The species is perennial, and is typically found in mature, open woodlands in a variety of soils, preferring those with substantial organic content. It requires a humid climate, and can withstand extremes in temperature, precipitation, and wind.

== Physical Characteristics ==
The stemless tick trefoil received its common name due to the absence of leaves on the flowering stem, as a separate stem which is about 50 cm or 1.6 ft. tall contains the leaves. The leaves are compound with three distinct 4–10 cm (1.6-3.9in.) leaflets that are deltoid, oval, or ovate in shape and are in an alternate leaf arrangement.

Near the base of the leaf bearing stem, a leafless stem containing the flowers of the plant grows to about 3 ft tall. The flowers are 6–8 mm (0.2-0.3in.) long, range from pink to purple in color, and follow the standard panicle or raceme form.

The species creates loment type fruit that can have from 1-4 seeds, but usually has 2-3, each having hooked hairs that stick onto clothing and fur as multiple seeded segments separate from the fruit.

An adult H. nudiflorum can bloom up to 109 flowers, and have a mean of 50 total flowers per plant, with 22 percent of its flowers producing fruit, each having an average of 2.8 seeds (Schaal and Smith, 1980). The species root system is led by a tap root.

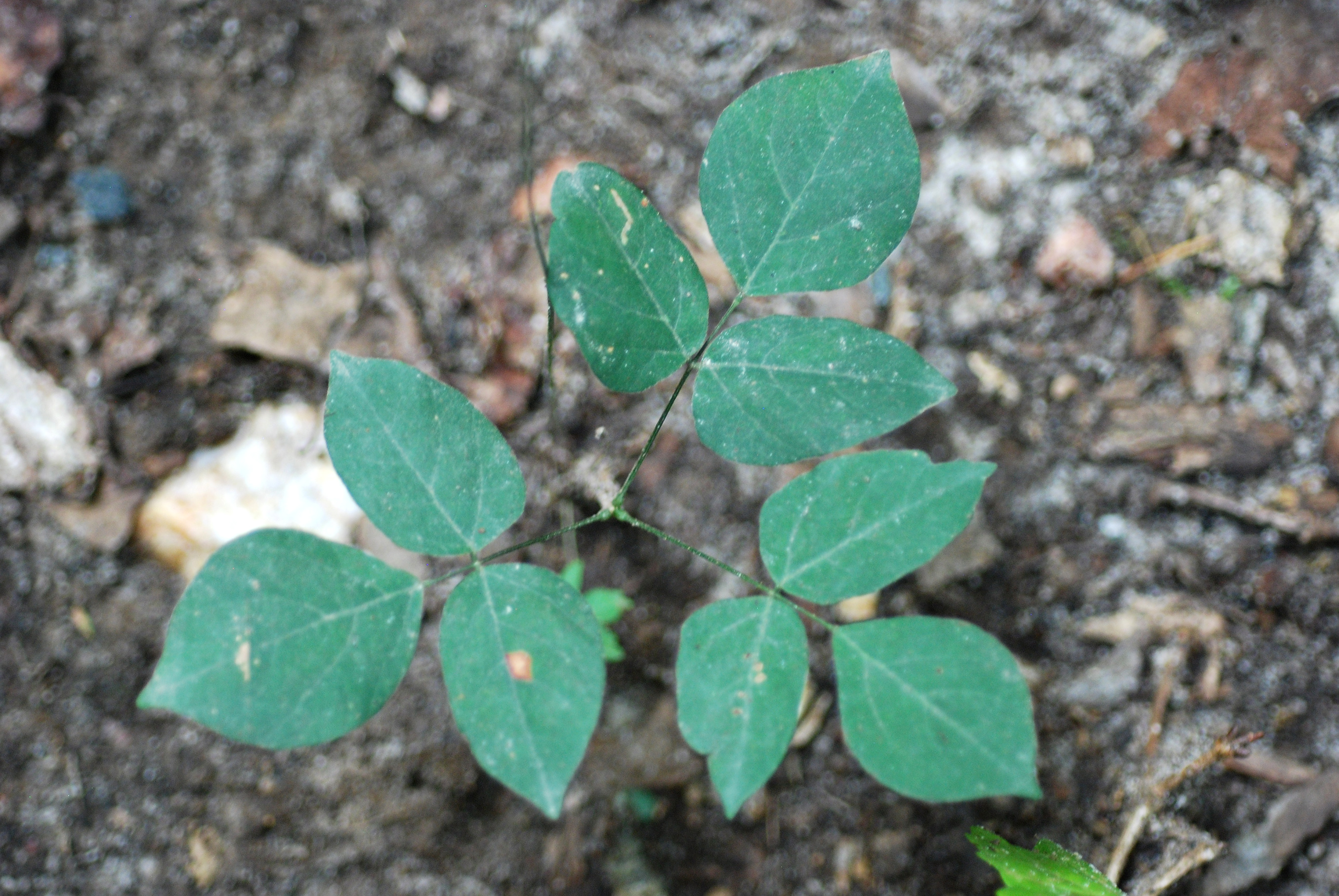
Leaves

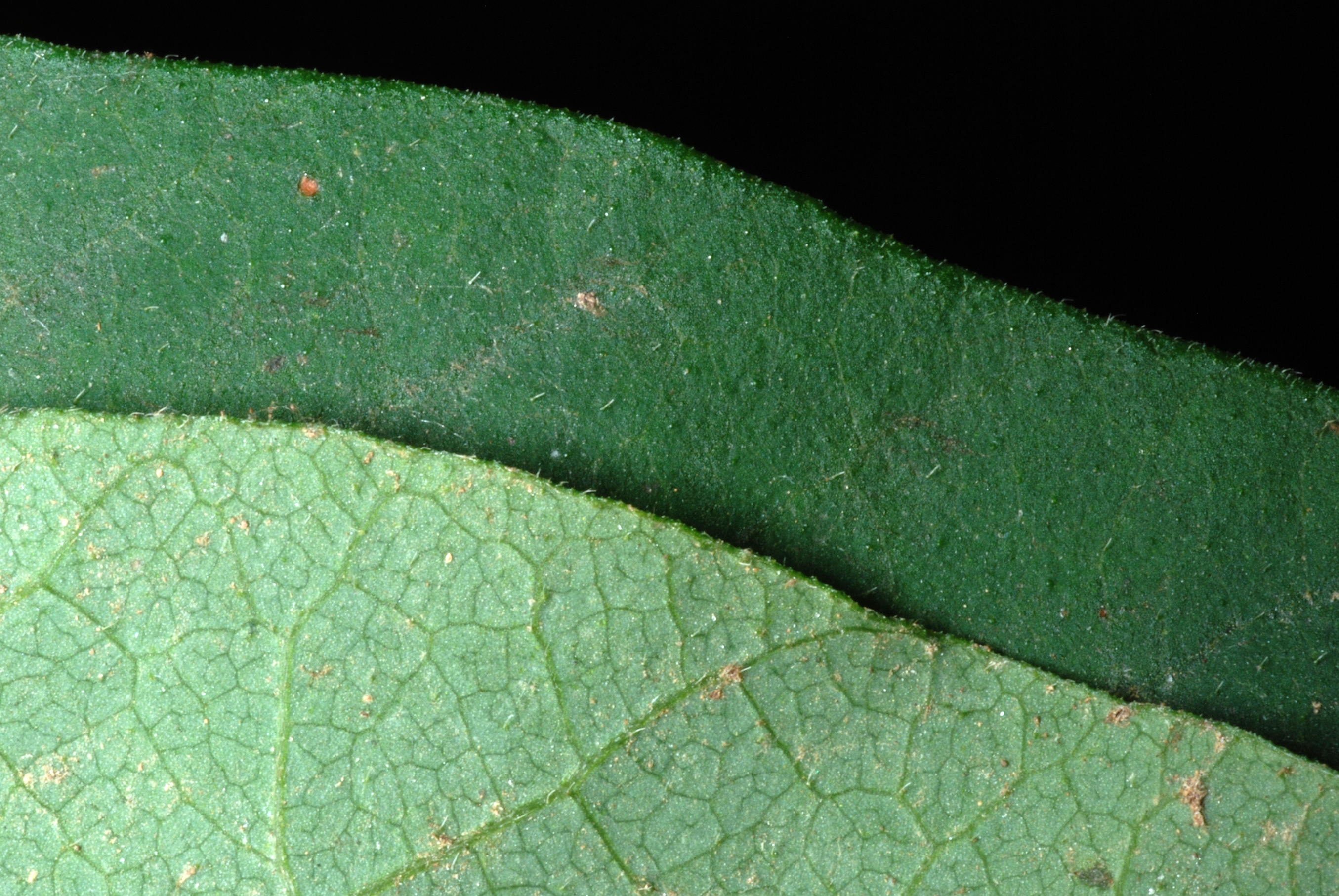
Extreme close-up of leaves

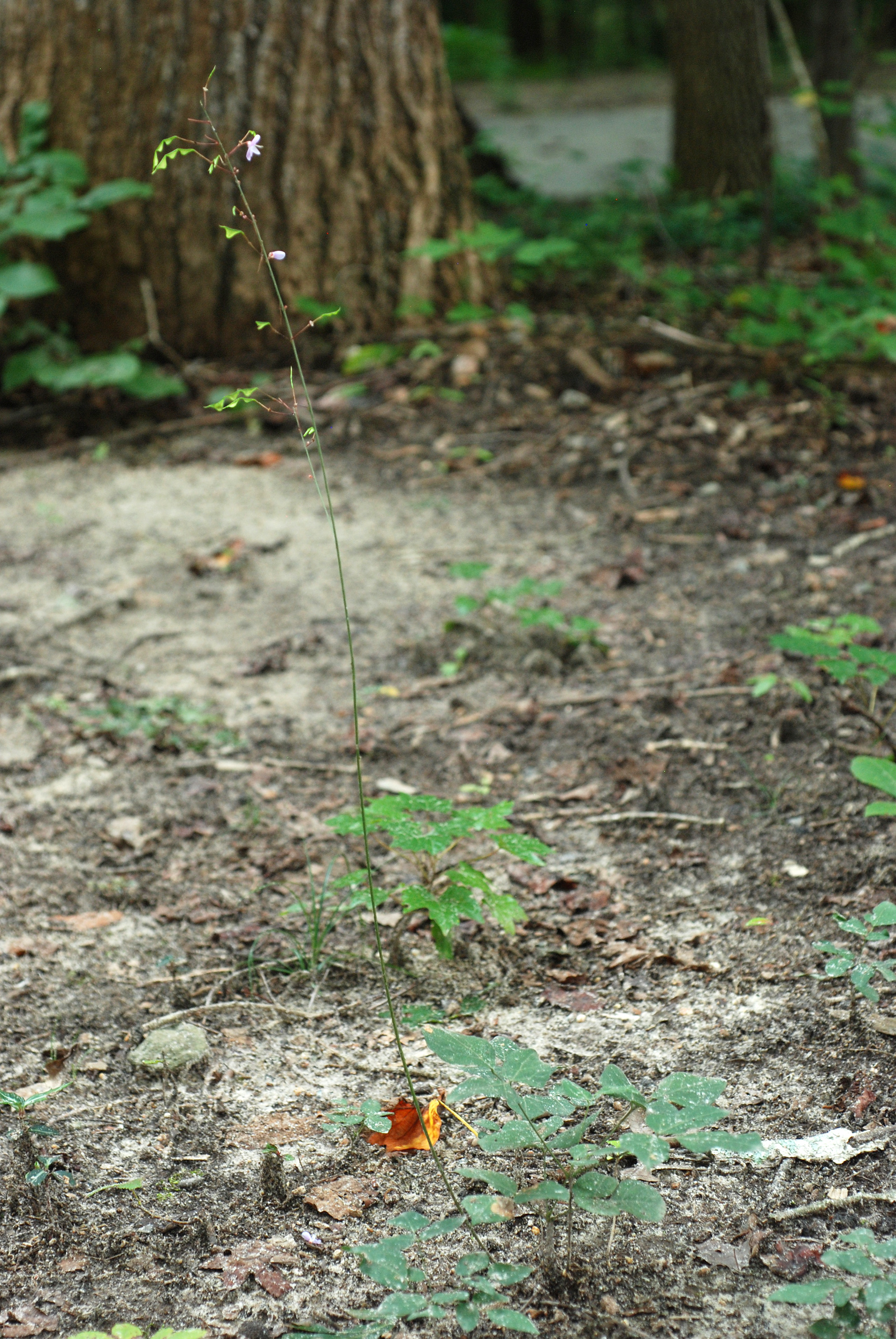
Habitat

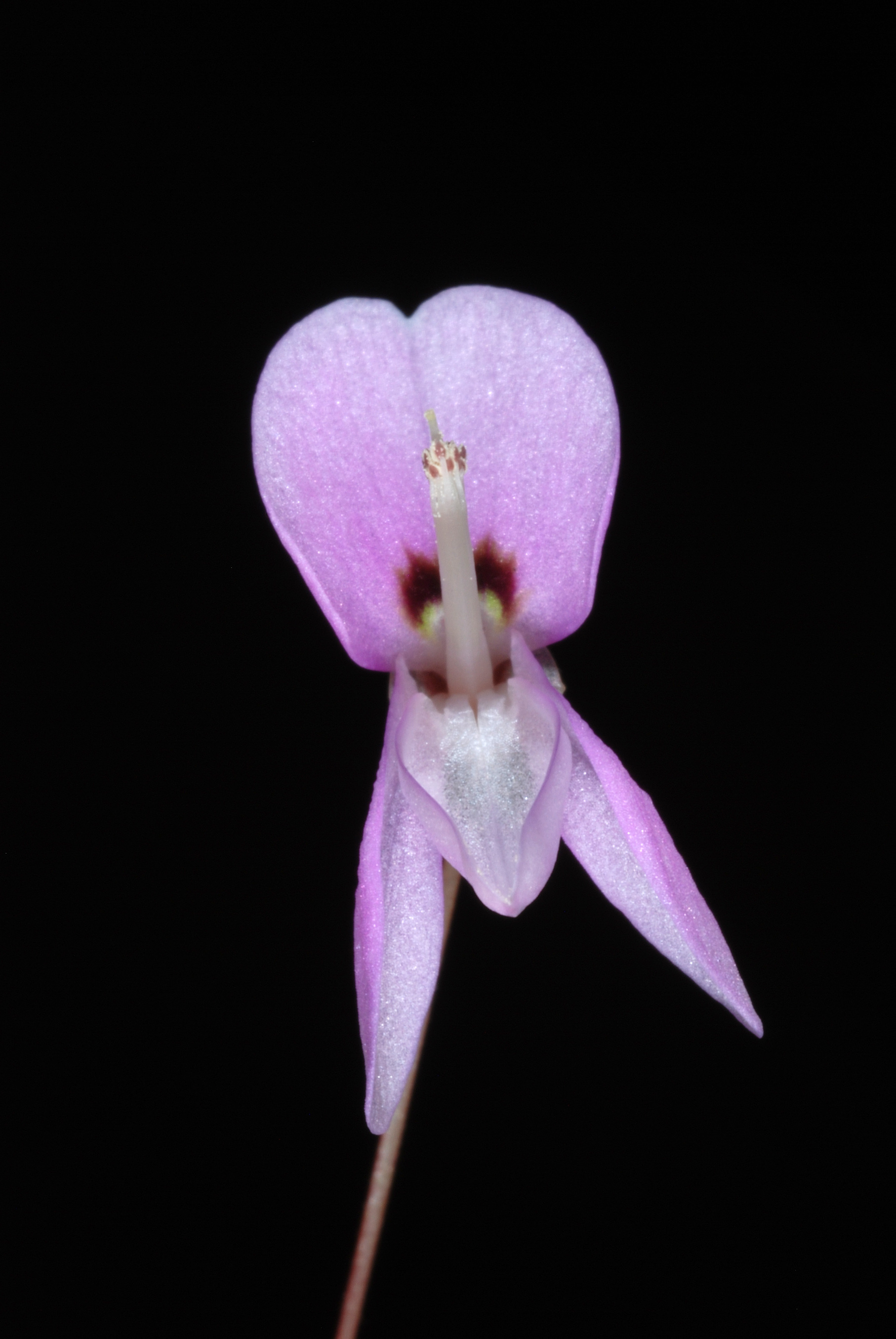
Close-up of flower

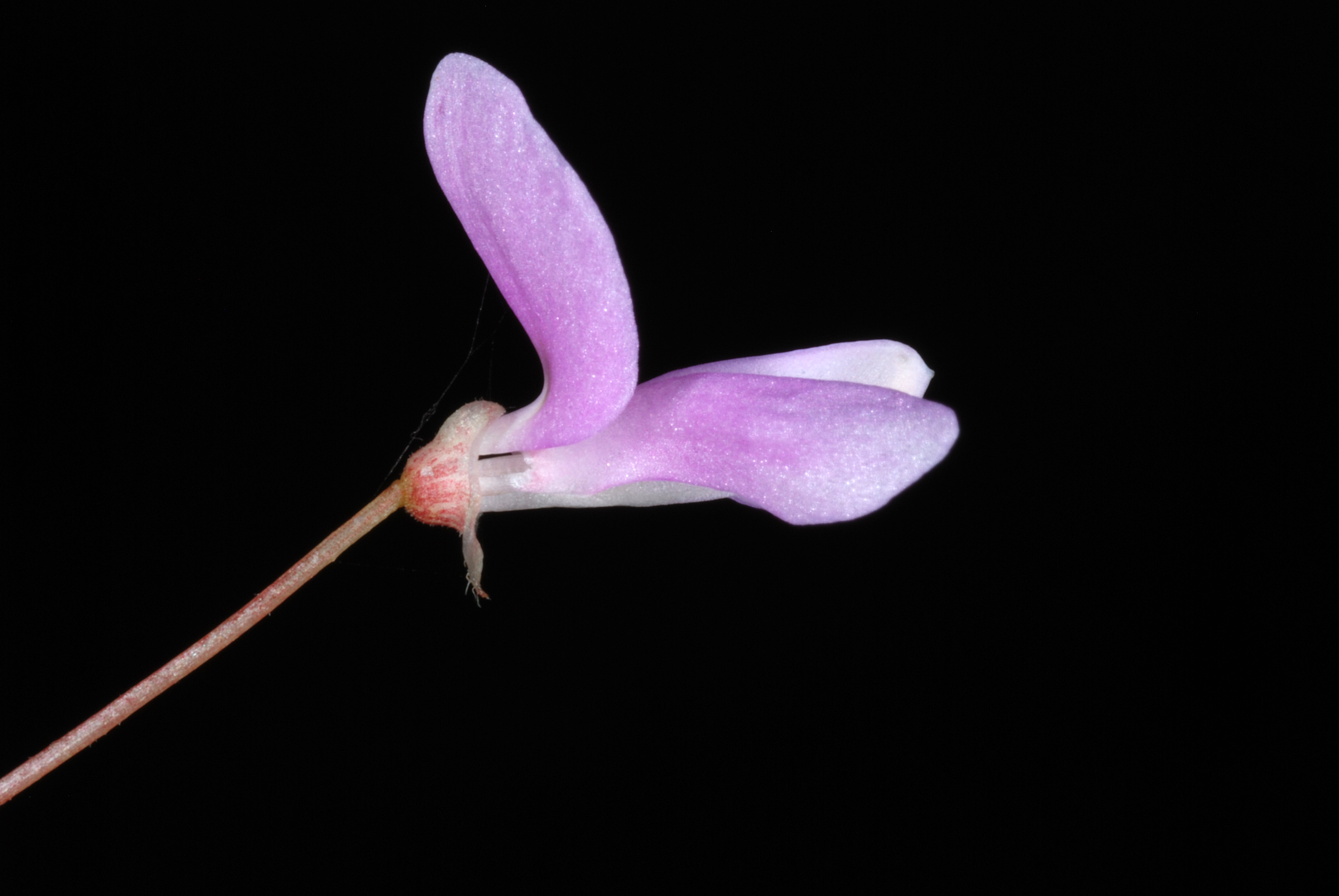
Side view of flower

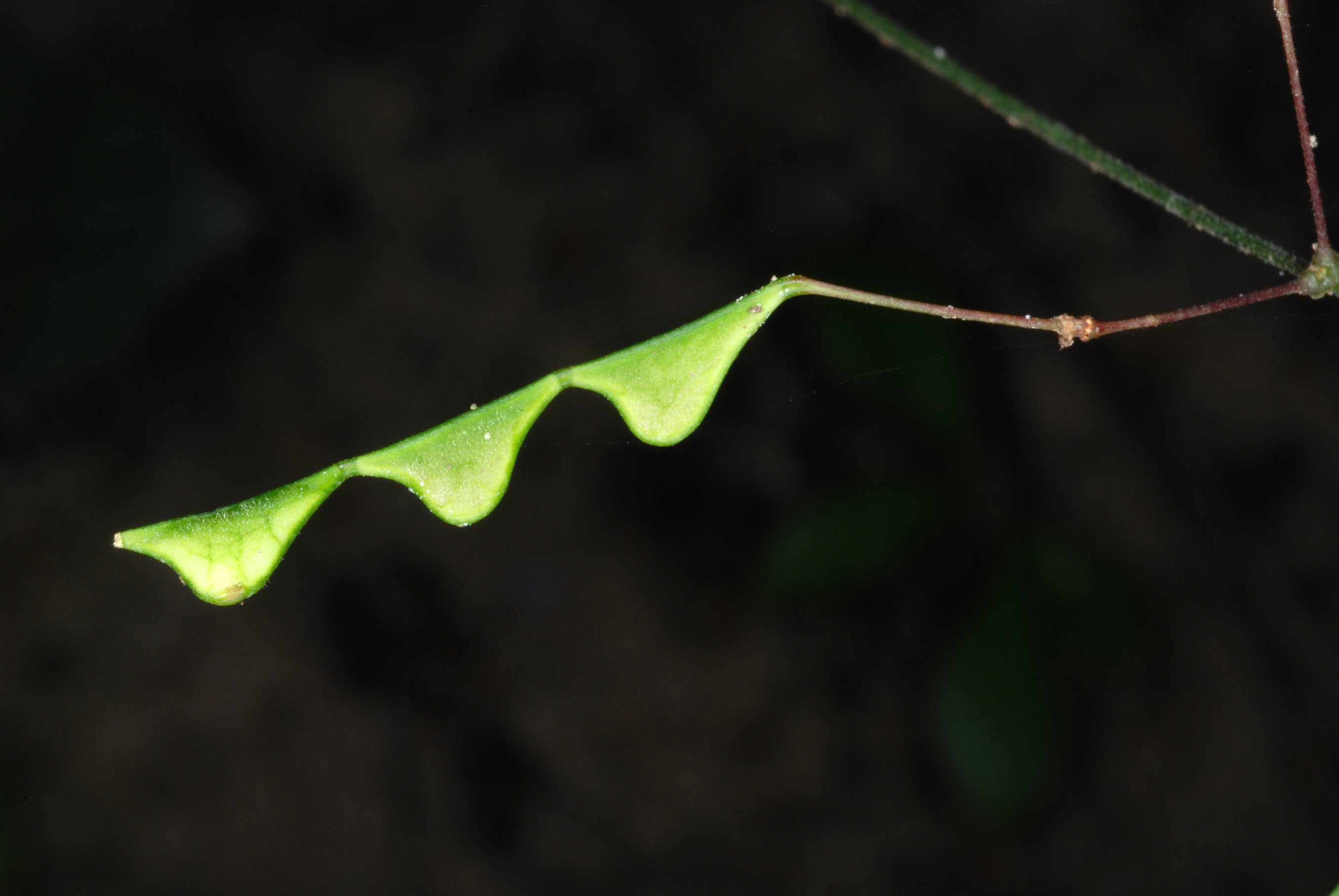
Seed pod

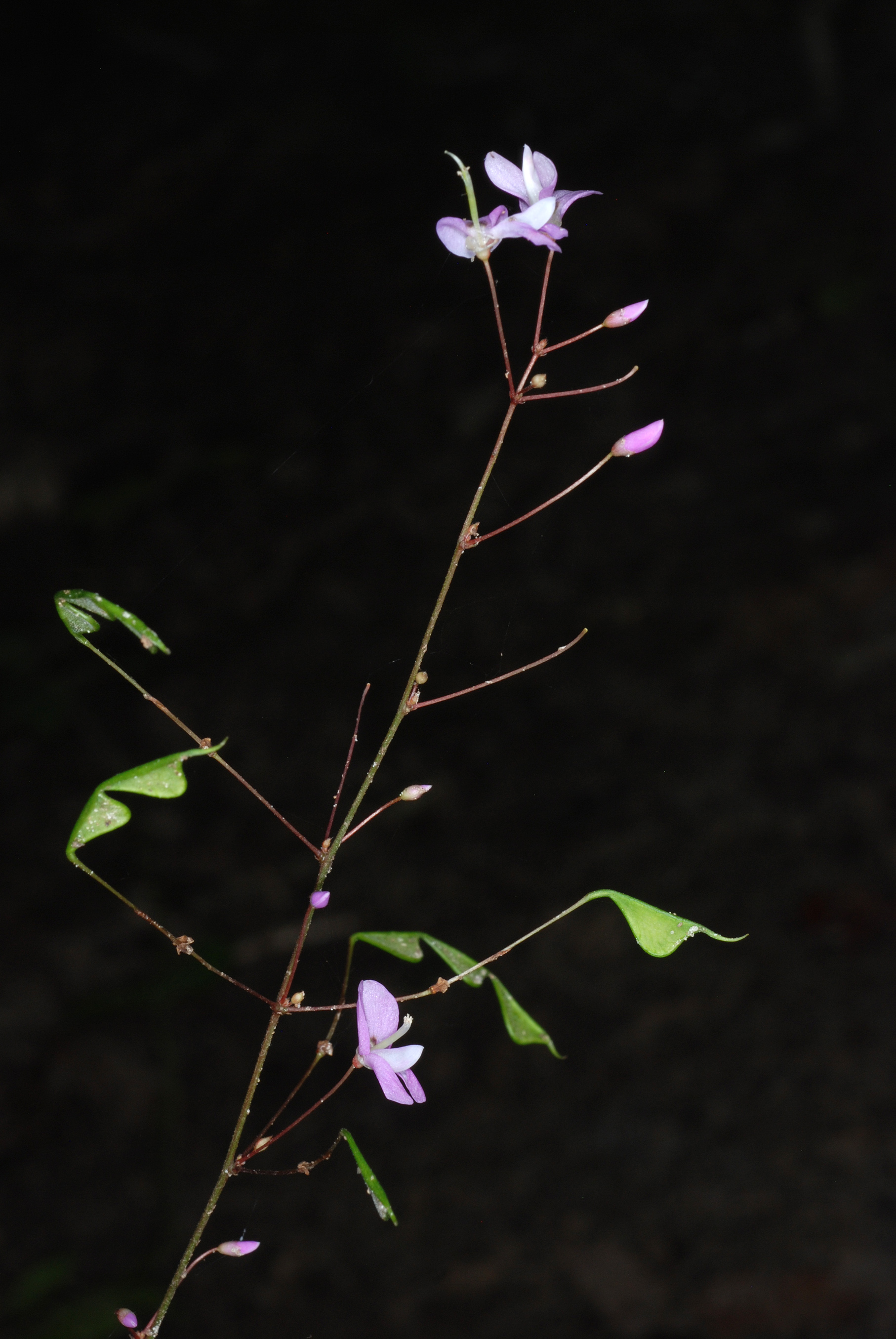
Indicating

== Pollination and Seed Dispersal ==
H. nudiflorum flowers have a sweet fragrance that attracts bees and other nectarivorous insects. Bumblebees serve the plant as its main pollinator, as outcrossing is the predominant form of reproduction and asexual reproduction doesn't occur. Dispersal of seeds is mainly attributed to the hooked hairs that attach to mammals with fur like deer.

The plants pollen grains are "tricolporate, medium in size, (28.1–)30.2(–33.1) μm in polar axis, (25.0–) 27.3(–29.7) μm in equatorial diameter, P/E = (1.02–)1.11(–1.21), prolate spheroidal or subprolate in shape, elliptic in equatorial view, and almost circular in polar view."

== Environment ==
H. nudiflorum is most typically seen in mature mesic oak forests, which is dominated by the Northern red oak and basswood, and can also contain white oak and black cherry trees. Within its habitat, the plant is described as a perennial forest forb as it subsides in low number and is confined to a specific colony area. The plant uses a usual amount of water, is typically found in partly shady areas that have a moist soil moisture, and grows in a circumneutral soil pH while being tolerant to the cold. The plants flowers bloom in July and August, and fruits in August and October.

== Distribution and Conservation Status ==
Hylodesmum nudiflorum is present across the eastern United States including AL, AR, CT, DC, DE, FL, GA, IA, IL, IN, KS, KY, LA, MA, MD, ME, MI, MN, MO, MS, NC, NH, NJ, NY, OH, OK, PA, RI, SC, TN, TX, VA, VT, WI, WV, as well as Canadian provinces Ontario and Quebec. As for its conservation status, the species is listed as secure in Indiana, Kentucky, New York, North Carolina, Pennsylvania, South Carolina, Virginia, and West Virginia; apparently secure in Ontario, Delaware, New Jersey, and Vermont; vulnerable in Iowa; imperiled in Quebec and Minnesota; and critically imperiled in Kansas. The rest of the areas aren't researched enough for determining conservation status. In less secure areas like Minnesota, the species is increasingly threatened due to loss of habitat and invasive species. Conservation efforts are put towards mainly habitat, so active management is not required.
