= Sand fleabane =

Sand fleabane is a common name for multiple plants and may refer to:

- Erigeron arenarioides, endemic to Utah
- Erigeron bellidiastrum, native to the western and central United States and northern Mexico
