= DeArment =

DeArment may refer to:

- Champion–DeArment Tool Company, shortened to Channellock, an American company that produces hand tools
- Roderick Allen DeArment (born 1948), U.S. politician, nominated to be United States Deputy Secretary of Labor under President George H.W. Bush in 1989.
