= School of Advanced International Studies =

International relations school of Johns Hopkins University

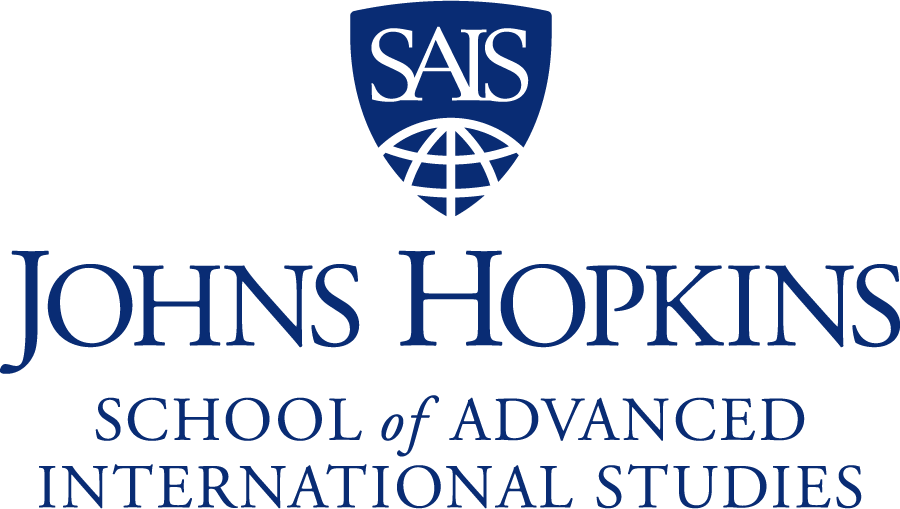
- Other names: SAIS; Paul H. Nitze School of Advanced International Studies
- Type: Private graduate school
- Established: 1943
- Parent institution: Johns Hopkins University (1950-)
- Academic affiliations: APSIA
- Dean: James Steinberg
- Postgraduates: 950
- Location: Washington, D.C., U.S.; Bologna, Italy; Nanjing, China; 38°53′35″N 77°01′09″W
- Website: sais.jhu.edu

The School of Advanced International Studies (SAIS) is a graduate school of Johns Hopkins University based in Washington, D.C. The school also maintains campuses in Bologna, Italy, and Nanjing, China.

The school is devoted to the study of international relations, diplomacy, national security, economics, and public policy. The school has hosted world leaders on a regular basis for public debate in international affairs.

The school was established in 1943 by Paul Nitze and Christian Herter who were seeking new methods of preparing men and women to cope with the international responsibilities that would be thrust upon the United States in the post-World War II world. Nitze feared the diplomatic and economic expertise developed in World War II might get lost if the nation became isolationist. Originally founded as a standalone graduate school, it became a part of Johns Hopkins University in 1950.

The school's DC campus is located in the 420,000-square-foot 555 Pennsylvania Avenue building, which was purchased by the university in 2019 and has undergone extensive renovation. Previously, the school was based on Embassy Row at Massachusetts Avenue.

== History ==
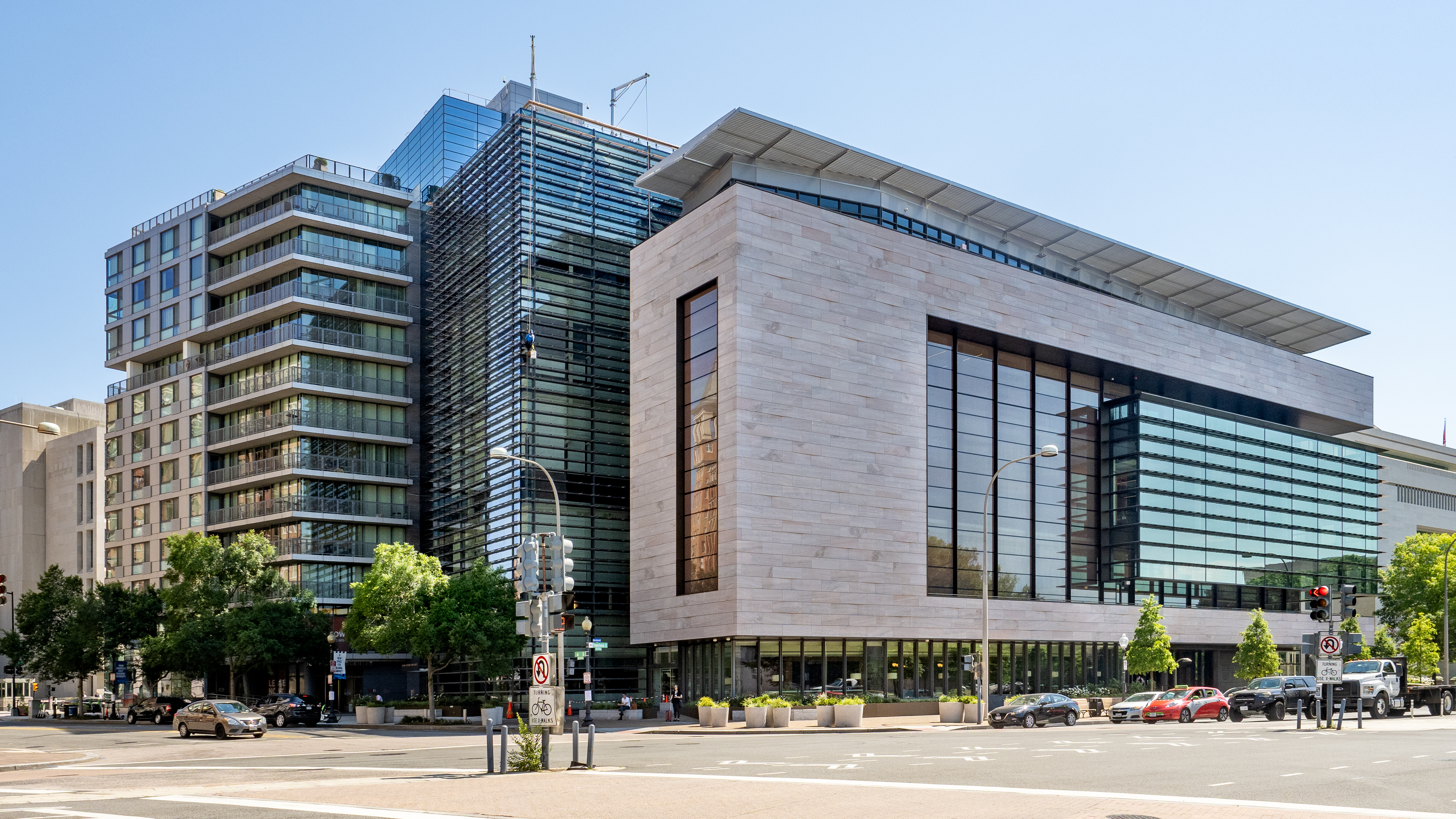
The Bloomberg Center (Previously the Newseum)

The School of Advanced International Studies was established in 1943 by Paul H. Nitze and Christian Herter who were seeking new methods of preparing men and women to cope with the international responsibilities that would be thrust upon the United States in the post-World War II world. Nitze feared the diplomatic and economic expertise developed in World War II might get lost if the nation became isolationist. Originally founded as a standalone graduate school, it became a part of Johns Hopkins University in 1950.

The founders assembled a faculty of scholars and professionals (often borrowed from other universities) to teach international relations, international economics, and foreign languages to a small group of students. The curriculum was designed to be both scholarly and practical. The natural choice for the location of the school was Washington, D.C., a city where international resources are abundant and where American foreign policy is shaped and set in motion. When the school opened in 1944, 15 students were enrolled.

In 1955, the school created the Bologna Center in Italy, the first full-time graduate school located in Europe under an American higher-education system. By 1963, Johns Hopkins SAIS outgrew its first quarters on Florida Avenue and moved to a location on Massachusetts Avenue. In 1986, the Hopkins–Nanjing Center was created in Nanjing, China, expanding the school's global presence. In January 2019, Johns Hopkins University announced that it had purchased the Newseum building on Pennsylvania Avenue NW and would remodel the building to house SAIS and other Washington, D.C.-based programs.

The school is a member of the Association of Professional Schools of International Affairs (APSIA), a group of schools of public policy, public administration, and international studies.

== Organization and academic programs ==
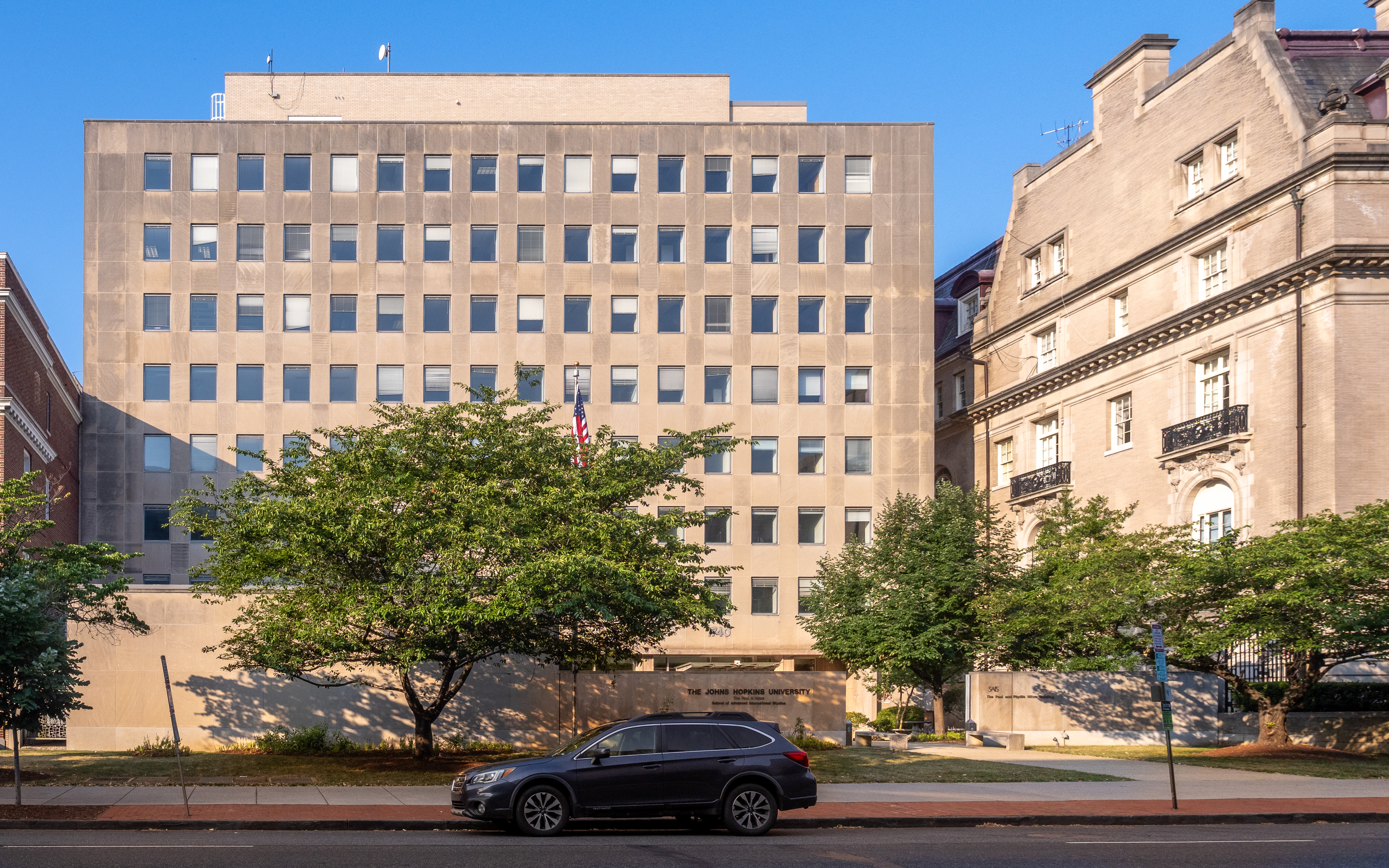
A campus building on Massachusetts Avenue NW in Washington, D.C.

Johns Hopkins SAIS is a global school with campuses on three continents. It has nearly 700 full-time students in Washington, D.C.; 190 full-time students in Bologna, Italy; and about 160 full-time students in Nanjing, China. Of these, 60 percent come from the United States and 37 percent from more than 70 other countries. Around 50% are women and 22% are from U.S. minority groups. SAIS Europe is home to the Bologna Center and the only full-time international relations graduate program in Europe that operates under an American higher-education system, and the Hopkins–Nanjing Center, which teaches courses in both Chinese and English, is jointly administered by Johns Hopkins SAIS and Nanjing University.

The school offers multidisciplinary instruction leading to the degrees of Master of Arts for early and mid-career professionals, as well as a Doctor of Philosophy program. Approximately 300 students graduate from the Washington, D.C., campus each year from the two-year Master of Arts program in international relations and international economics. Unlike most other international affairs graduate schools that offer professional master's degrees, Johns Hopkins SAIS requires its Master of Arts candidates to be proficient in another language outside their mother tongue and fulfill the International Ecopass, a one-hour capstone oral examination synthesizing and integrating knowledge from the student's regional or functional concentration and international economics. The oral examination and international economics requirements of the Master of Arts curriculum have been the signature aspects of the school's education.

== Rankings ==
A study conducted in 2005 examined graduate international relations programs throughout the United States, interviewing over a thousand professionals in the field, with the results subsequently published in Foreign Policy magazine as "Inside the Ivory Tower" rankings. 65 percent of respondents named Johns Hopkins University–SAIS as the best terminal master's program in international relations. SAIS received the most votes, followed by Georgetown University's School of Foreign Service, Harvard University's John F. Kennedy School of Government, Tufts University's Fletcher School of Law and Diplomacy, and the School of International and Public Affairs at Columbia University. The latest edition of the study was produced in 2014, with the master's program at SAIS ranking second globally after the Georgetown School of Foreign Service. SAIS students and alumni have been informally known as the ‘SAIS Mafia’ among international relations circle especially by networks inside the Beltway owing to their presence within the field and close-knit community.

Since 1990, SAIS and the Fletcher School have been the only non-law schools in the United States to participate in the Philip C. Jessup International Law Moot Court Competition. Competing against full-time law students, SAIS generalists have performed very well. SAIS has twice placed second overall out of 12 schools and advanced to the "final four" in its region. In head-to-head competitions, SAIS has defeated schools such as Georgetown University Law Center and the University of Virginia School of Law.

SAIS students have successfully competed in the Sustainable Innovation Summit Challenge hosted by Arizona State University's Thunderbird School of Global Management. Two different SAIS teams won first place in both 2007 and 2008.

A joint team from SAIS and the Wharton School at the University of Pennsylvania received second place in the first "Global Challenge" competition, a first-of-its-kind competition that challenged teams of MBA and other graduate students to develop a public–private venture to support development and the tourism industry in Asia. The competition was organized in 2010 by the Robert H. Smith School of Business at the University of Maryland and the United States Agency for International Development.

Notable economists affiliated with the school include former World Bank Chief Economist Anne Krueger, and former Fulbright Chair in Economics at Harvard University Michael D. Plummer. Many influential political scientists are also affiliated with the school, including Pulitzer-prize winning historian Anne Applebaum, United States Institute of Peace Board Member Eric Edelman, member of the International Board of Advisors at Oxford University Blavatnik School of Government Vali R. Nasr, former Counselor of the United States Department of State Eliot Cohen, former Chair in Southeast Asian Studies at the Carnegie Endowment for International Peace Vikram Nehru, former Chairperson of the United Nations Human Rights Council Advisory Committee Obiora Okafor, and former MIT Frank Stanton Chair in Nuclear Security Policy Studies Francis J. Gavin.

== Annual themes ==
From 2005 to 2012, Johns Hopkins SAIS dedicated a substantive theme for each academic year in order to encourage its students, faculty, academic programs, policy centers, and alumni to examine the role of the particular theme within international affairs. These specific themes provided opportunities for the school to review scholarship and exchange views through special lectures, conferences, and guest speakers. The school hosted public events during the following themes of Energy (2005–06), China (2006–07), Elections and Foreign Policy (2007–08), Year of Water (2008–09), Religion (2009–10), Demography (2010–11), and Agriculture (2011–12) and enhanced its fundraising with high-profile public events such as the lecture delivered by then–vice president of BP, Nick Butler, during the Year of Energy in 2005.

== Child Protection Project ==
In June 2009, The Protection Project at SAIS partnered with the Koons Family Institute of the International Centre for Missing & Exploited Children (ICMEC), creating the Child Protection Project, to draft a model law focusing on the issues of child protection; in particular: "neglect, abuse, maltreatment, and exploitation". The primary objectives of the Child Protection Project are to "research existing child protection laws in the 193 member states of the United Nations (UN); convene a series of regional expert working group meetings to establish a common definition for 'child protection'; create a database of national legislation and case law on child protection issues from around the world; and draft, publish, and globally disseminate model child protection legislation".

The drafting process included six expert group meetings, held in Singapore, Egypt, Costa Rica, Spain, Turkey, and the United States. The final version of the Child Protection Model Law was published in January 2013. It was presented to the members of the United Nations Committee on the Rights of the Child during its 62nd Session in Geneva, Switzerland, in January 2013. It was also presented before the 129th Assembly of the Inter-Parliamentary Union (IPU) in Geneva in October 2013. Accompanying the Child Protection Model Law, ICMEC and The Protection Project published a companion "100 Best Practices in Child Protection" guide in 2013.

== Research centers ==
- JHU Foreign Policy Institute
- Alperovitch Institute for Cybersecurity Studies
- Bologna Institute for Policy Research (Italy)
- Center for Canadian Studies
- Central Asia-Caucasus Institute
- Silk Road Studies Program
- Center For Constitutional Studies And Democratic Development (Italy)
- Center for Displacement Studies
- Center for International Business and Public Policy
- Center for Strategic Education
- Center on Politics and Foreign Relations
- China-Africa Research Initiative
- Cultural Conversations
- The Edwin O. Reischauer Center for East Asian Studies
- Hopkins-Nanjing Research Center (China)
- Grassroots China Initiative
- Institute for International Research (China)
- International Reporting Project
- Philip Merrill Center for Strategic Studies
- The Protection Project
- Public-Private Partnerships Initiative
- Bernard L. Schwartz Forum on Constructive Capitalism
- SME Institute
- Swiss Foundation for World Affairs
- Global Energy and Environment Initiative
- Global Health and Foreign Policy Initiative

== Publications ==
In addition to the different books and periodicals edited by SAIS programs or research centers, several school-wide publications are to be mentioned:

- SAIS Review – A journal on leading contemporary issues of world affairs, founded in 1956
- SAIS Observer – A student-written, student-run newspaper founded in 2002, the official student newspaper of the global SAIS community
- SAIS Reports – A newsletter that highlights new faculty, research institutes, academic programs, student and alumni accomplishments, and events at the school, published bimonthly from September through May
- SAIS Europe Journal of Global Affairs (formally the Bologna Center Journal of International Affairs) – A student-run journal on scholarly contributions to international relations, published online and annually as a print version
- Centerpiece – The alumni newsletter of the Nanjing Center
- Working Paper Series – A series of papers managed by the PhD students
- SAIS Perspectives – Publication focused on Development, Climate, and Sustainability

== Notable alumni ==
Johns Hopkins SAIS has nearly 17,000 alumni working around the world in approximately 140 countries. Over 130 SAIS graduates have become ambassadors for various countries.

- Gina Abercrombie-Winstanley – Current Chief Diversity and Inclusion Officer for The Department of State, former U.S.Ambassador to The Republic of Malta (2012-2016)
- Thomas Bolling Robertson – former U.S Ambassador to Slovenia, former Dean of the Leadership and Management School of the Foreign Service Institute of the Department of State
- Thomas Stelzer – Dean and Executive Secretary of the International Anti-Corruption Academy (IACA)
- Mahamat Ali Adoum – former foreign affairs minister, Chad's ambassador to the United Nations
- Ebenezer Akuete – former Ghanaian diplomat
- Madeleine Albright – former U.S. Secretary of State (attended SAIS, but did not earn degree)
- Peter F. Allgeier – deputy U.S. Trade Representative (2001–2009) and former acting U.S. Trade Representative
- Mark Andersen – Washington, D.C.–based activist and author. Co-founded punk activist group Positive Force and senior citizen support and advocacy organization We are Family.
- Cresencio S. Arcos – U.S. Ambassador to Honduras (1989–1993), deputy assistant secretary of state for international narcotics and law enforcement (1993–95), and Assistant Secretary of Homeland Security for International Affairs (2003–2006)
- David Berger – 38th commandant of the U.S. Marine Corps
- Nancy Birdsall – founding president of the Center for Global Development in Washington, D.C.
- Robert O. Blake, Jr. – U.S. Ambassador to Indonesia (since 2013), former U.S. Assistant Secretary of State for South and Central Asian Affairs (2009–13), former U.S. Ambassador to Sri Lanka and the Maldives (2006–2009)
- Wolf Blitzer – CNN journalist and television news anchor
- Adam Boulton – Sky News political editor
- Jeremy Bowen – BBC journalist and presenter
- Gayleatha B. Brown – former U.S. Ambassador to Benin and current Ambassador designee to Burkina Faso
- R. Nicholas Burns – current U.S. Ambassador to China, former U.S. Under Secretary of State for Political Affairs, former U.S. Ambassador to NATO and Greece, member of the Board of Directors of Harvard Kennedy School Belfer Center for Science and International Affairs
- James Cason – former U.S. Ambassador to Paraguay
- Herman Jay Cohen – U.S. diplomat, former ambassador to various countries in Africa
- Cui Tiankai – People's Republic of China's ambassador to the United States of America, former vice foreign minister
- Jean-Maurice Dehousse – former Belgian Minister-President of the Wallonia region, former mayor of Liège
- Anne E. Derse – U.S. Ambassador to Lithuania, SAIS '81
- John Caspar Dreier – former U.S. Ambassador to the Organization of American States
- Hermann Eilts – former U.S. Ambassador to Saudi Arabia and Egypt, worked with Egyptian president Anwar el-Sadat throughout the Camp David Accords
- Jessica Einhorn – former dean of SAIS, member of the board of directors of Time Warner, former director of the Council on Foreign Relations, and a former managing director of the World Bank
- Robert Stephen Ford – former U.S. Ambassador to Algeria and Syria
- Dennis Francis – Trinidad and Tobago ambassador and President of the United Nations General Assembly at its seventy-eighth session
- Jeffrey Garten – former U.S. Under Secretary of Commerce for International Trade, and former dean of the Yale School of Management
- Timothy F. Geithner – former U.S. Secretary of the Treasury and president and CEO of the Federal Reserve Bank of New York
- April Glaspie – American diplomat, first woman to be appointed U.S. Ambassador to an Arab country, best known as the U.S. Ambassador to Iraq in the runup to the 1991 Gulf War
- Gabriel Guerra-Mondragón – U.S. Ambassador to Chile (1994–1998)
- Geir H. Haarde – former Prime Minister of Iceland (2006–2009)
- John J. Hamre – president and CEO of the Center for Strategic and International Studies (CSIS), former U.S. Deputy Secretary of Defense
- John E. Herbst – former U.S. Ambassador to Ukraine and Uzbekistan, current Coordinator for Reconstruction and Stabilization as a career member of the Senior Foreign Service
- John J. Hicks – intelligence officer, second director of National Photographic Interpretation Center
- Melanie Harris Higgins – U.S. Ambassador to Burundi
- James Howard Holmes – former U.S. Ambassador to Latvia
- Hans Hoogervorst – Dutch politician and economist, Minister of Finance (2002–2003), Minister of Health, Welfare and Sport (2003–2007)
- Tracey Ann Jacobson – former U.S. Ambassador to Turkmenistan and Tajikistan
- Colin F. Jackson—former Deputy Assistant Secretary of Defense for Afghanistan, Pakistan, and Central Asia; Chairman of the Strategic and Operational Research Department (SORD) at the U.S. Naval War College
- Angela Kane – UN Undersecretary General for Management
- Malcolm H. Kerr – American University of Beirut President and Academic, assassinated
- Shahal M. Khan – owner of the Plaza Hotel
- Bert Koenders – Dutch politician and diplomat, Minister for Development Cooperation (2007–2010), Minister of Foreign Affairs (2014–2017)
- Andrew Kuchins – former President of American University of Central Asia, Bishkek, Kyrgyzstan, Central Asia and Russia expert
- Anthony Kuhn – NPR correspondent in Beijing, China, Hopkins-Nanjing Center Certificate '92
- Lousewies van der Laan – Dutch politician and jurist
- Alan Larson (born 1949), diplomat and U.S. Ambassador
- Frank Lavin – U.S. Under Secretary of Commerce for International Trade, former U.S. Ambassador to Singapore
- Jim Leach – chairman of National Endowment for the Humanities, former U.S. Representative from Iowa, former chair of U.S. House of Representatives Committee on Financial Services, former faculty and trustee at Princeton University
- Lee Tae-sik – former Republic of Korea's ambassador to the United States
- Samuel W. Lewis – former U.S. Ambassador to Israel and U.S. Ambassador at the Camp David Accord talks in 1978
- Dennis P. Lockhart – president and CEO of the Federal Reserve Bank of Atlanta
- Gabriel Silva Luján – Colombia's twice ambassador to the United States, and Minister of Defence
- Edward Luttwak – political scientist and military historian, author of Coup d'État: A Practical Handbook
- Peter Magowan – former owner of the San Francisco Giants and former CEO of Safeway (attended SAIS, but did not earn degree)
- Sir David Manning – British Ambassador to Israel (1995–1998), Foreign Policy Adviser to former British prime minister Tony Blair (2001–2003), British Ambassador to the United States (2003–2007)
- John E. McLaughlin – former Deputy Director of Central Intelligence
- Christopher Meyer – British ambassador to the United States during the Second Gulf War
- Ana Belen Montes – spy for Cuba working at the Defense Intelligence Agency and arrested in 2001
- Thant Myint-U – Burmese historian, writer, grandson of former Secretary-General of the United Nations U Thant
- Loretta Napoleoni – bestselling author of Terror Incorporated and Insurgent Iraq. She is an expert on financing of terrorism and advises several governments on counter-terrorism
- Pat O'Brien – television personality
- John E. Osborn – former commissioner, U.S. Advisory Commission on Public Diplomacy; affiliate faculty in law and international studies, University of Washington; senior executive with life sciences companies Cephalon and Onyx Pharmaceuticals
- Ted Osius – former U.S. Ambassador to Vietnam (2014–2017)
- Suyoi Osman – Bruneian health minister
- Ronald D. Palmer – former U.S. Ambassador to Malaysia
- Gerhard Pfanzelter – secretary general of the CEI, former permanent representative of Austria to the UN, Ambassador of Austria to Syria, Senegal, Gambia, Cape Verde, Guinea-Bissau, Mali and Mauritania
- Nicholas Platt – former U.S. Ambassador to Pakistan, Philippines, and Zambia; former president of the Asia Society
- Danielle Pletka – senior vice president of the American Enterprise Institute for Foreign and Defense Studies and former member of Senate Foreign Relations Committee
- Slater Rhea – singer and TV personality in China, Hopkins-Nanjing Center MAIS '17
- Charles P. Ries – U.S. Minister for Economic Affairs and Coordinator for Economic Transition in Iraq (2007–2008), U.S. Ambassador to Greece (2004–07)
- Marcie Berman Ries – former U.S. Ambassador to Albania, former U.S. Ambassador to Bulgaria
- Jauhar Saleem – Pakistani diplomat
- Arturo Sarukhán – Mexico's ambassador to the United States
- David Shear – former U.S. Ambassador to Vietnam (2011–2014)
- Kevin Sieff – Africa bureau chief at The Washington Post, former Afghanistan bureau chief (2012–2014)
- Bandar bin Sultan – Saudi Arabia's former ambassador to the United States
- Levi Tillemann – advisor to the Department of Energy, author
- Michael G. Vickers – Under Secretary of Defense for Intelligence, Department of Defense
- Joris Voorhoeve – Dutch politician, diplomat and political scientist, Minister of Defence (1994–1998)
- Jacob Walles – U.S. Ambassador to Tunisia (2012–2015), U.S. Consul General in Jerusalem (2005–2009)
- Wang Guangya – People's Republic of China's Ambassador and Permanent Representative to the United Nations
- Juleanna Glover Weiss – political consultant and lobbyist
- Clifton R. Wharton, Jr. – former U.S. Deputy Secretary of State
- Jody Williams – Nobel Peace Prize recipient for her leadership of the International Campaign to Ban Landmines
- Lois Wolk – member of the California State Senate
- Cara Elizabeth Yar Khan – disability advocate, public speaker and United Nations humanitarian
- Bo Bo Nge – Burmese economist, vice governor of the Central Bank of Myanmar, and political prisoner
- Bill Grueskin – former Academic Dean at Columbia Journalism School, former Managing Editor of WSJ.com (The Wall Street Journal)

== Past and present faculty ==
- Fouad Ajami – professor of Middle Eastern studies
- David W. Barno - professor of practice, former Commander, Combined Forces Afghanistan. Senior Fellow, The Philip Merrill Center for Strategic Studies.
- Lucius D. Battle – former U.S. Ambassador to Egypt, Assistant Secretary of State for the Near East and Africa, and president, Middle East Institute; founded SAIS Foreign Policy Institute
- Peter Bergen – CNN terrorism analyst and author of Holy War, Inc
- Zbigniew Brzezinski – former National Security Advisor to President Jimmy Carter
- Edward B. Burling – partner of the law firm Covington & Burling
- David P. Calleo – former director of European Studies Program, author of Rethinking Europe's Future
- Rajiv Chandrasekaran – associate editor, The Washington Post; former SAIS journalist-in-residence for the International Reporting Project, author of Imperial Life in the Emerald City: Inside Iraq's Green Zone
- Eliot A. Cohen – professor of strategic studies and director of the Strategic Studies Program, former counselor of the U.S. Department of State, author of Military Misfortunes: The Anatomy of Failure in War and Supreme Command: Soldiers, Statesmen, and Leadership in Wartime
- W. Max Corden – trade economist, developed Dutch disease model
- Francis Deng – former representative of the UN Secretary-General on Internally Displaced Persons
- Luis Ernesto Derbez – Mexican minister of finance and foreign affairs
- David Dodge – former governor of the Bank of Canada
- Eric S. Edelman – former U.S. Under Secretary of Defense for Policy, former U.S. Ambassador to Finland and Turkey, visiting scholar at the Philip Merrill Center for Strategic Studies and Distinguished Fellow at the Center for Strategic and Budgetary Assessments
- Jessica Einhorn – former dean of SAIS, member of the Board of Directors of Time Warner, former director of the Council on Foreign Relations, and a former managing director of the World Bank
- Francis Fukuyama – former director of the SAIS International Development program, and author of The End of History and the Last Man
- Grace Goodell – professor of international development
- Jakub J. Grygiel – George H. W. Bush Assistant Professor of International Relations
- Christian Herter – former U.S. Secretary of State and Governor of Massachusetts
- Josef Joffe – German journalist
- Mara Karlin - assistant secretary of defense for strategy, plans, and capabilities
- Majid Khadduri – professor of Islamic law and Middle East specialist
- Kenneth H. Keller – former director of the SAIS Bologna Center, former president of the University of Minnesota system
- Pravin Krishna – Chung Ju Yung Professor of International Economics and Business
- Cornelius C. (Neil) Kubler – former American co-director of the Hopkins–Nanjing Center.
- Anne O. Krueger – professor of international economics, former first deputy managing director of the IMF and World Bank Chief Economist; former president, American Economic Association
- Andrew Kuchins – former President of American University of Central Asia, Bishkek, Kyrgyzstan, Central Asia and Russia expert.
- David M. Lampton – George and Sadie Hyman Professor of China Studies, Director of the China Studies Program, and former dean of faculty
- Paul Linebarger – former professor of Asian studies, best known as a science fiction author under the pseudonym Cordwainer Smith
- Marisa Lino – former director of the SAIS Bologna Center, former U.S. Ambassador to Albania, and former assistant secretary for international affairs at the U.S. Department of Homeland Security
- Michael Mandelbaum – professor of American foreign policy
- John E. McLaughlin – former deputy director of the Central Intelligence Agency, Senior Fellow at the Brookings Institution
- Robert H. Mundell – Nobel Prize in Economics laureate, 1999
- Kendall Myers – former U.S. Foreign Service Officer and SAIS part-time faculty member who was arrested in 2009 on charges of 30 years of espionage on behalf of Cuba
- Azar Nafisi – Iranian-American academic and author of Reading Lolita in Tehran and "Things I've Been Silent About"
- Paul H. Nitze – drafter of NSC 68 modifying the U.S. Cold War strategy of containment from a primarily economic and diplomatic strategy to one based more fully on military confrontation
- Don Oberdorfer – journalist, Korea expert
- Robert E. Osgood – third dean of SAIS, former director of the American Foreign Policy program and co-director of the Security Studies program, and former member of the U.S. Secretary of State's Policy Planning Council from 1983 to 1985.
- Henry Paulson – former U.S. Secretary of the Treasury, distinguished visiting fellow at the Bernard Schwartz Forum on Constructive Capitalism
- Riordan Roett – professor of Latin American studies
- Stephen M. Schwebel – former Edward B. Burling Professor of International Law and Organization at SAIS and former judge and president of the International Court of Justice, currently leading international arbitrator and counsel in Washington, D.C.
- András Simonyi – former ambassador of Hungary to the United States
- Robert Skidelsky – economist, biographer of John Maynard Keynes
- R. Jeffrey Smith – former journalist-in-residence, Pulitzer Prize winner
- Stephen Szabo – former professor of European studies, current head of the Transatlantic Academy at the German Marshall Fund
- Shirin R. Tahir-Kheli – former research professor, former Special Assistant to the President and National Security Council senior director for democracy, human rights and international operations
- Nate Thayer (Visiting Scholar) – investigative journalist who interviewed Pol Pot and Kang Kek Iew
- Dale C. Thomson – director of the Center of Canadian Studies, author, Secretary/Advisor to Canadian Prime Minister, Louis St. Laurent
- Robert W. Tucker – former professor of American foreign policy, and co-author of The Imperial Temptation: The New World Order and America's Purpose
- David Unger – journalist, member of The New York Times editorial board, author of The Emergency State: America's Pursuit of Absolute Security at All Costs
- Ruth Wedgwood – Edward B. Burling Professor of International Law and Diplomacy, and Director of the Program in International Law and Organizations; U.S. member of the United Nations Human Rights Committee
- Paul Wolfowitz – former president of the World Bank, former U.S. Deputy Secretary of Defense, former dean of SAIS
- I. William Zartman – former professor and director of the SAIS Conflict Management program
- Alejandro Toledo (visiting scholar) – former president of Peru
- Yascha Mounk – associate professor of the Practice, known for work on populism
- Jessica Chen Weiss – Professor of China Studies
- Jeremy Lee Wallace – Professor of China Studies

== See also ==
- Professorial Lecturer, a specialised title used for an academic expert at the school
- SAIS Bologna Center
- Hopkins-Nanjing Center
- Walter Hines Page School of International Relations, something of a predecessor school at Johns Hopkins
