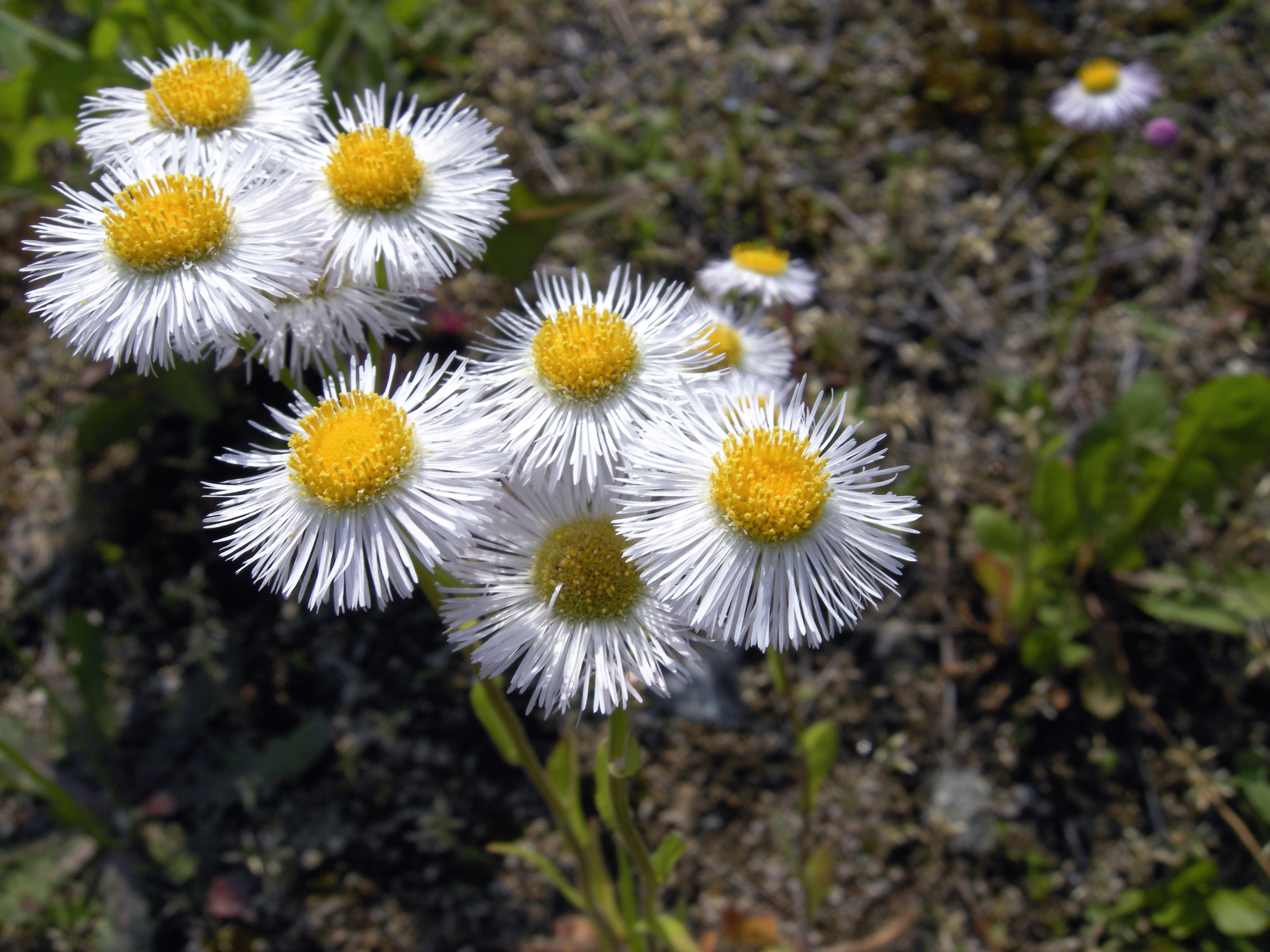
- Flower heads

Conservation status
- Secure (NatureServe)

Scientific classification
- Kingdom: Plantae
- Clade: Embryophytes
- Clade: Tracheophytes
- Clade: Spermatophytes
- Clade: Angiosperms
- Clade: Eudicots
- Clade: Asterids
- Order: Asterales
- Family: Asteraceae
- Genus: Erigeron
- Species: E. annuus

Binomial name
- Erigeron annuus (L.) Pers.

Subspecies
- E. annuus subsp. lilacinus Sennikov & Kurtto

Synonyms
- Basionym: Aster annuus L.; Alphabetical list: Aster stenactis E.H.L.Krause; Cineraria corymbosa Moench; Diplopappus annuus Bluff & Fingerh.; Diplopappus dubius Cass.; Doronicum bellidiflorum Schrank; Erigeron annuus f. discoideus Vict. & J.Rousseau; Erigeron annuus var. discoideus (Vict. & J.Rousseau) Cronquist; Erigeron annuus var. typicus Cronquist; Erigeron bellidioides Spenn.; Erigeron diversifolius Rich. ex Rchb.; Erigeron heterophyllus Muhl. ex Willd.; Erigeron strigosus Bigelow; Phalacroloma acutifolium Cass.; Phalacroloma annuum (L.) Dumort.; Pulicaria annua Gaertn.; Pulicaria bellidiflora Wallr.; Stenactis annua (L.) Cass. ex Less.; Stenactis annua Cass.; Stenactis dubia Cass.

= Erigeron annuus =

Species of flowering plant

Erigeron annuus (formerly Aster annuus), the annual fleabane, daisy fleabane, or eastern daisy fleabane, is a species of herbaceous flowering plant, annual or biennial, in the family Asteraceae.

== Description ==
Erigeron annuus often grows as an annual plant but can sometimes grow as a biennial. It is herbaceous with alternate, simple leaves, and green, sparsely hairy stems, which can grow to between 30 and 150 centimeters (about 1 to 5 feet) in height. Leaves are numerous and large relative to other species of Erigeron, with lower leaves, especially basal leaves, coarsely toothed or cleft, a characteristic readily distinguishing this species from most other Erigeron. Upper leaves are sometimes (not always) toothed, but may have a few coarse teeth towards the outer tips.

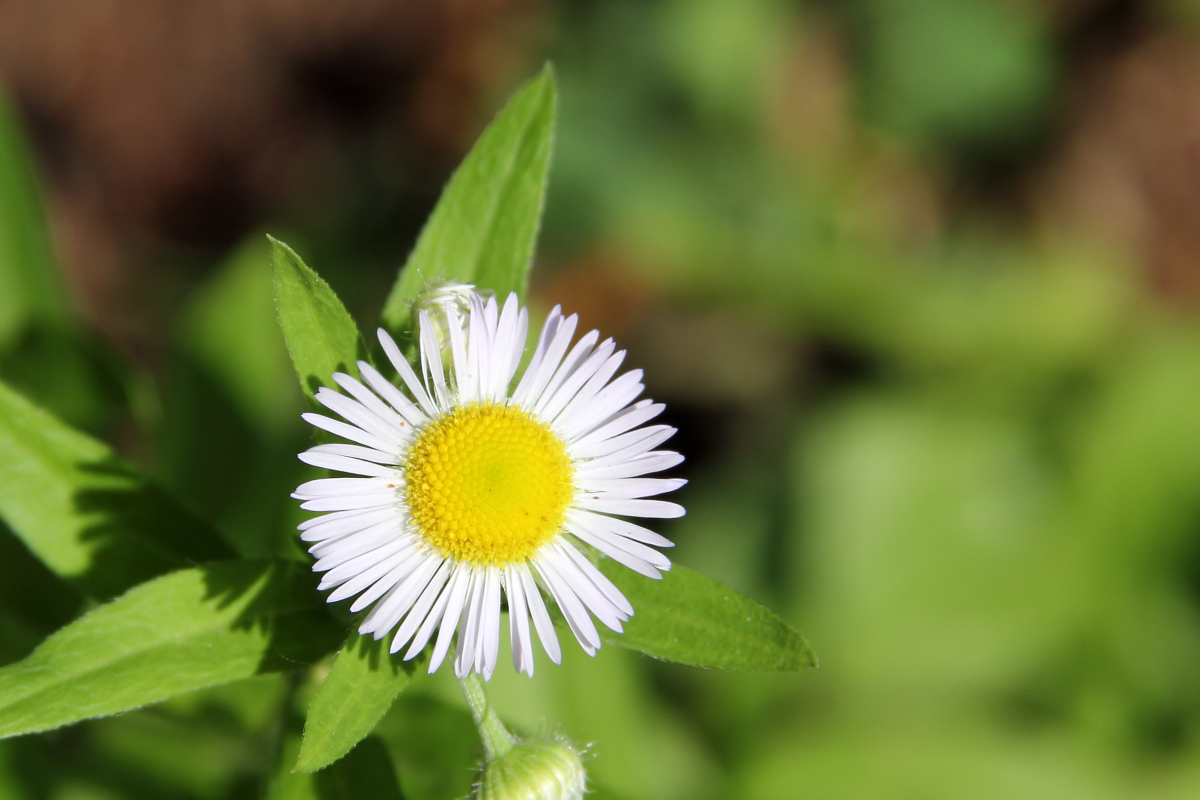
Close-up of Erigeron annuus

The flower heads are white with yellow centers, with rays that are white to pale lavender, borne spring through fall depending on the individual plant. Ray florets number 40 to 100.

== Distribution and habitat ==
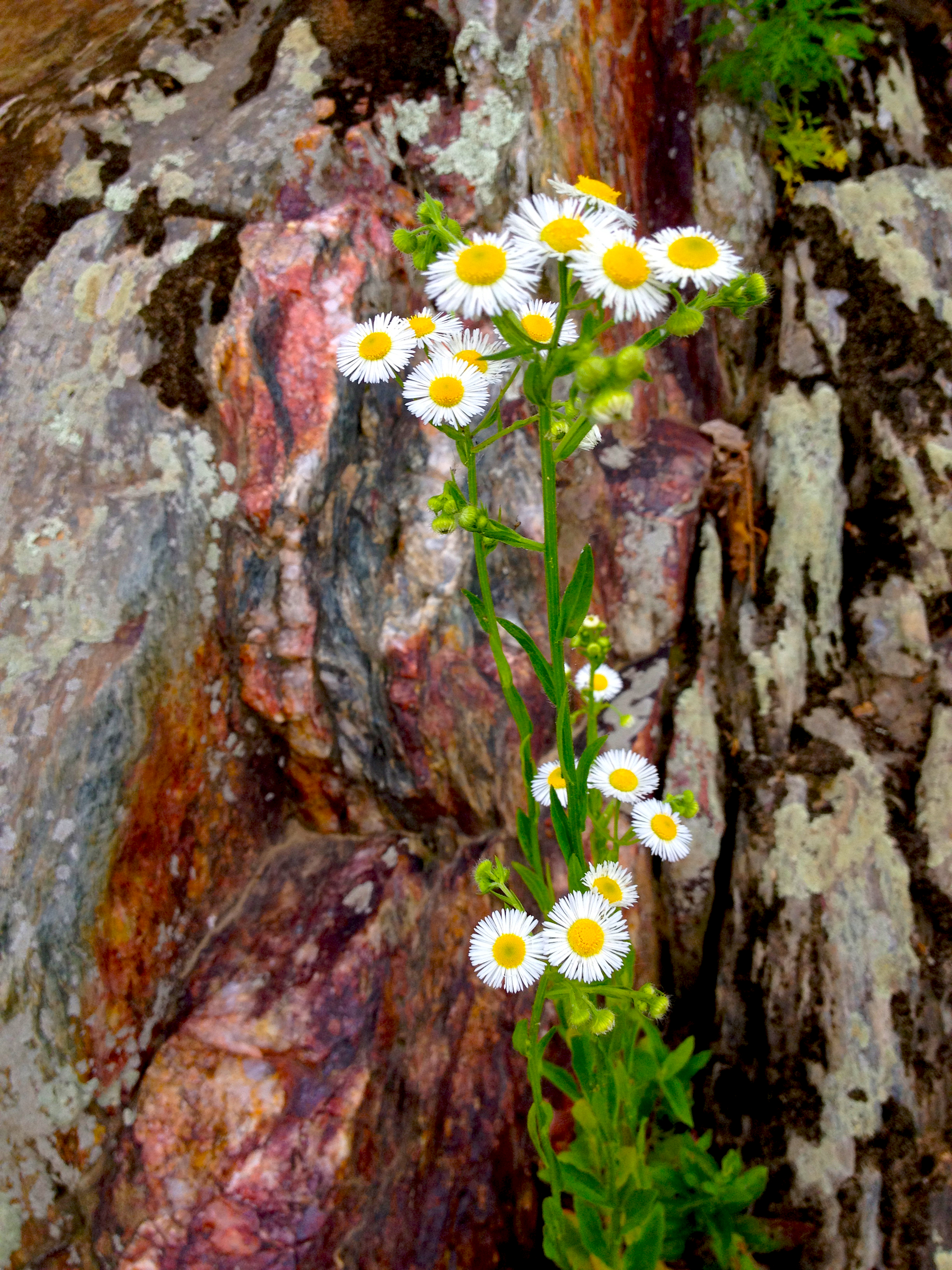
E. annuus at Scott's Run Nature Preserve, Fairfax County, Virginia

Erigeron annuus is native to North America and Central America. It is widespread in most of the United States, especially in the eastern part of its range, but occurs only in scattered locations in the western and southernmost parts of its range. It has been introduced to many other places, including Korea, Europe, India, and other areas in Asia.

Erigeron annuus grows well in full through partial sun on sites with ample moisture. It is tolerant of a wide range of soil conditions, including gravel and clay. In hot, dry weather, lower leaves often yellow and wither.

== Ecology ==
Erigeron annuus is a native pioneer species that often colonizes disturbed areas such as pastures, abandoned fields, vacant lots, roadsides, railways, and waste areas. In these habitats it competes, often successfully, with introduced invasive weeds.

Flowers are pollinated by a variety of bees, including little carpenter bees, cuckoo bees, halictine bees, and masked bees; as well as flies, including syrphid flies, bee flies, tachinid flies, flesh flies, anthomyiid flies, and muscid flies. Wasps, small butterflies, and other insects also visit the flowers to a lesser degree, seeking nectar, as well as a few pollen-feeding beetles.

Schinia lynx (lynx flower moth) caterpillars feed on the flowers and seeds of annual fleabane and other fleabanes, and Lygus lineolaris (tarnished plant bug) sucks the plant juices. Some mammals eat the foliage, flowers and stems, including sheep and deer.
