= Elizabeth Chryst =

American political strategist (born 1959)

Elizabeth Baldwin Chryst (born July 5, 1959, in Washington, DC) is a small business owner, Republican legislative strategist and consultant and a past elected United States Senate Officer. Chryst is the first woman to have been elected by the United States Senate to serve as the U.S. Senate Secretary for the Majority for the republicans. She was also elected as the United States Senate Secretary for the Minority. Chryst is the founder of GradeGov.com. and provides political information and commentary for several news and current events publications. Chryst was the chairperson of the Habitat for Humanity-Marion County, Florida affiliate. She also hosts a twice weekly radio show entitled Congress College and serves as a principal in the Washington, DC consulting firm of Congressional Global Strategies.

In office from 1995 to 2001, she was preceded by Howard O. Greene Jr. and succeeded by David Schiappa.

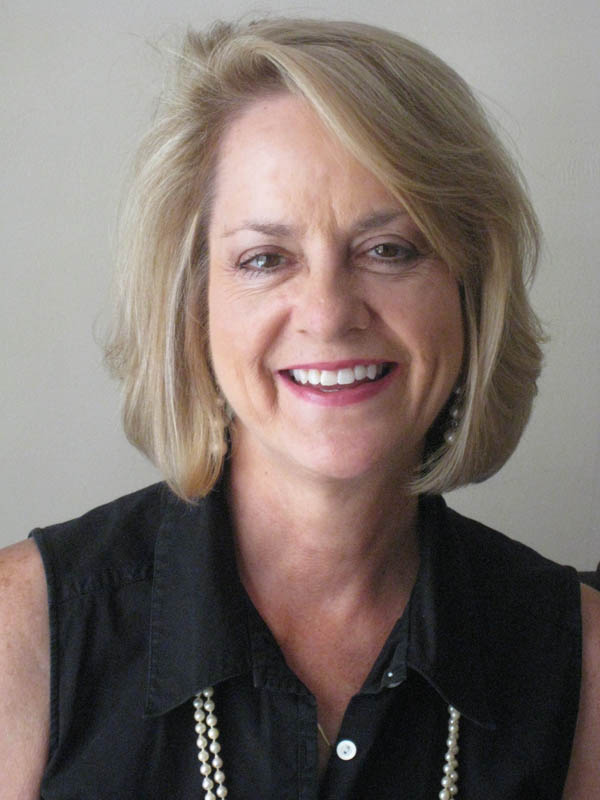
Elizabeth Chryst

== Personal life ==
Elizabeth Bolling Baldwin was born to Donald W. and Joan B. Baldwin in Washington DC. While living in the DC area and working in the Senate, Ms. Baldwin married Howard O. Greene Jr. and was known as Elizabeth B. Greene. She was the widow of Ron Hilton Letchworth until her marriage in 2015 to Raymond Richard Chryst. She currently divides her time between Washington D.C. and East Texas.

== Career ==
Elizabeth Baldwin Chryst began her 26-year career in the U.S. Senate in 1975 as a Senate page. From 1976 to 1977 Chryst (née Baldwin) worked in the leadership office of Senate Republican Leader Hugh Scott (R-PA). Subsequently, she moved into the Senate Republican Cloakroom and became the first female Cloakroom assistant. In 1980 Chryst moved to a newly created office as Director of the Senate Legislative Scheduling office where Chryst held responsibilities including scheduling officers to preside over daily Senate proceedings as well as scheduling legislation and Executive nominations for then Senate Majority Leader, Howard Baker (R-TN).

In 1994 Senator Bob Dole (R-KS) proposed that Chryst be elected by the United States Senate to be the first and only women elected to serve as the United States Senate Secretary for the Majority (Republican) On Jan. 4, 1995 Elizabeth was elected Secretary for the Majority pursuant to Senate Resolution 8. (104th Congress, 1st session.) She served in this position until June 2001 when, as a result of the party switching by Sen. James Jeffords of Vermont, the Senate republicans were then casts into the Minority party. Elizabeth was elected the Secretary for the Minority, U.S. Senate on June 6, 2001, by Senate Resolution 105

Chryst's career in the U.S. Senate involved all aspects of Senate floor proceedings. These aspects included: authoring Senate rules changes, overseeing the Presidential impeachment proceedings of President William J. Clinton and negotiating and coordinating the first and only 50/50 shared power agreement between the Senate Republicans and Democrats when the U.S. Senate membership ratio was equal for part of the calendar year 2001.

Chryst uses her previous political experience and current affiliations to help inform and to promote understanding for citizens within the current political climate. She currently is the founder and owner/editor of the website GradeGov.com.

Chryst was a frequent columnist for the Sunshine State News as well as The Daily Caller.com. Letchworth is the past chairperson of the Habitat for Humanity of Marion County Florida affiliate. (Link: Habitat for Humanity of Marion County - Home) and served as a senior legislative advisor to Covington & Burling in Washington, DC. She serves on various committees as a lay leader for the 1st United Methodist Church in Dunnellon, FL.

== Sources ==
- Resolution 8: http://thomas.loc.gov/cgi-bin/query/D?c104:4:./temp/~mdbsObSIdu::
- Resolution 105: http://thomas.loc.gov/cgi-bin/query/D?c107:1/temp/~jnDmXW::
- U.S. Senate Organizational Chart:
- Gradegov.com:
- Oral History Project, Women of the Senate
