= Jeremy Lee Wallace =

American political scientist

- Other names: 萬家瑞
- Citizenship: American
- Education: Indiana University Bloomington (BA); Stanford University (PhD)
- Occupation(s): Political scientist, China specialist
- Employer: Johns Hopkins SAIS
- Website: https://jeremywallace.org

Jeremy Lee Wallace is an American political scientist. He is currently A. Doak Barnett Professor of China Studies at Johns Hopkins University's School of Advanced International Studies. His research focuses on urbanization in China.

== Education ==
Wallace holds a BA in economics and political science from Indiana University Bloomington and a PhD in political science from Stanford University.

== Career ==
Prior to joining Johns Hopkins SAIS in July 2024, Wallace was a professor of government at Cornell University.

== Publications ==
=== Books ===
- Seeking Truth and Hiding Facts: Information, Ideology, and Authoritarianism in China, Oxford University Press, 2022
- Cities and Stability: Urbanization, Redistribution, and Regime Survival in China, Oxford University Press, 2014

=== Articles ===
- How Do We Know What's Happening in China? Foreign Policy, November 4, 2024
- Why China Aims Too High: The Return of Beijing's Dubious Economic Growth Targets, Foreign Affairs, October 18, 2022
