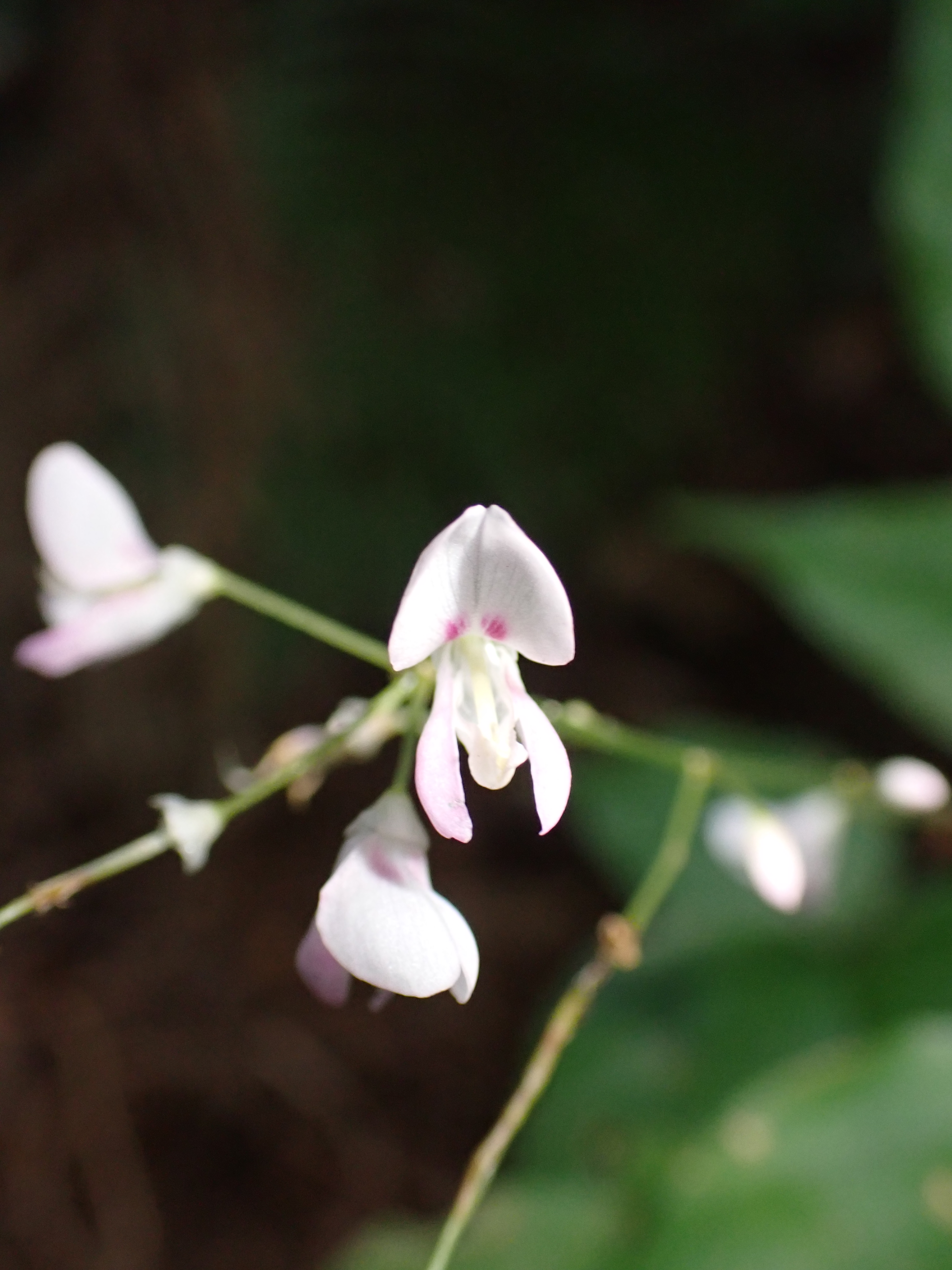

Scientific classification
- Kingdom: Plantae
- Clade: Tracheophytes
- Clade: Angiosperms
- Clade: Eudicots
- Clade: Rosids
- Order: Fabales
- Family: Fabaceae
- Subfamily: Faboideae
- Genus: Hylodesmum
- Species: H. leptopus

Binomial name
- Hylodesmum leptopus (A.Gray ex Benth.) H.Ohashi & R.R.Mill

= Hylodesmum leptopus =

Species of plant

Hylodesmum leptopus is a species of tick-trefoil in the family Fabaceae.
