= Kevin Sieff =

American journalist

Kevin Sieff is an American journalist who became the Washington Post's Latin America Correspondent in 2018. He was previously Africa bureau chief between 2014 and 2018. Before that, he was the paper's Kabul bureau chief for three years.

== Life and career ==
He attended Brown University and the Johns Hopkins School of Advanced International Studies. Previously, he was a reporter for the Financial Times based in Washington, D.C. He has also written for The Guardian.

In 2013, he was a finalist for the Livingston Award for "Field of Danger," which exposed the danger to civilians posed by a U.S. firing range in Afghanistan. In 2016, he was a finalist for the Livingston Award for a series on the migrant route from Sub-Saharan Africa to Europe.
