= Edward B. Burling =

American lawyer

- Born: Edward Burnham Burling; February 1, 1870; Eldora, Iowa, U.S.
- Died: September 3, 1966 (aged 96); Washington, D.C., U.S.
- Education: Grinnell College (AB); Harvard University (LLB)
- Occupation: Lawyer
- Employer: Covington & Burling
- Known for: founder of Covington & Burling

Edward Burnham Burling (February 1, 1870 – September 3, 1966) was a prominent American lawyer and the named partner of the Washington, D.C.–based law firm of Covington & Burling.

== Biography ==
He grew up in Eldora, Iowa, and worked in a grocery store at age eleven, and went on to Grinnell College and then to Harvard Law School. After graduation, he returned to the Midwest to practice in Chicago for almost 25 years.

Later he came to Washington as general counsel for the United States Shipping Board where he was introduced to Harry Covington. They established the law firm on January 1, 1919.

In the 1940s, Burling was one of the core group brought together by Paul Nitze and Christian Herter to establish the School of Advanced International Studies at Johns Hopkins University. Mr. Burling served on the School's Advisory Council until his death in 1966. The Chair of International Law and Organizations is named after him since 1972.

== See also ==
- Scott's Run Nature Preserve – previously under his ownership
