= Arjun Singh Sethi =

American lawyer and writer (born 1981)

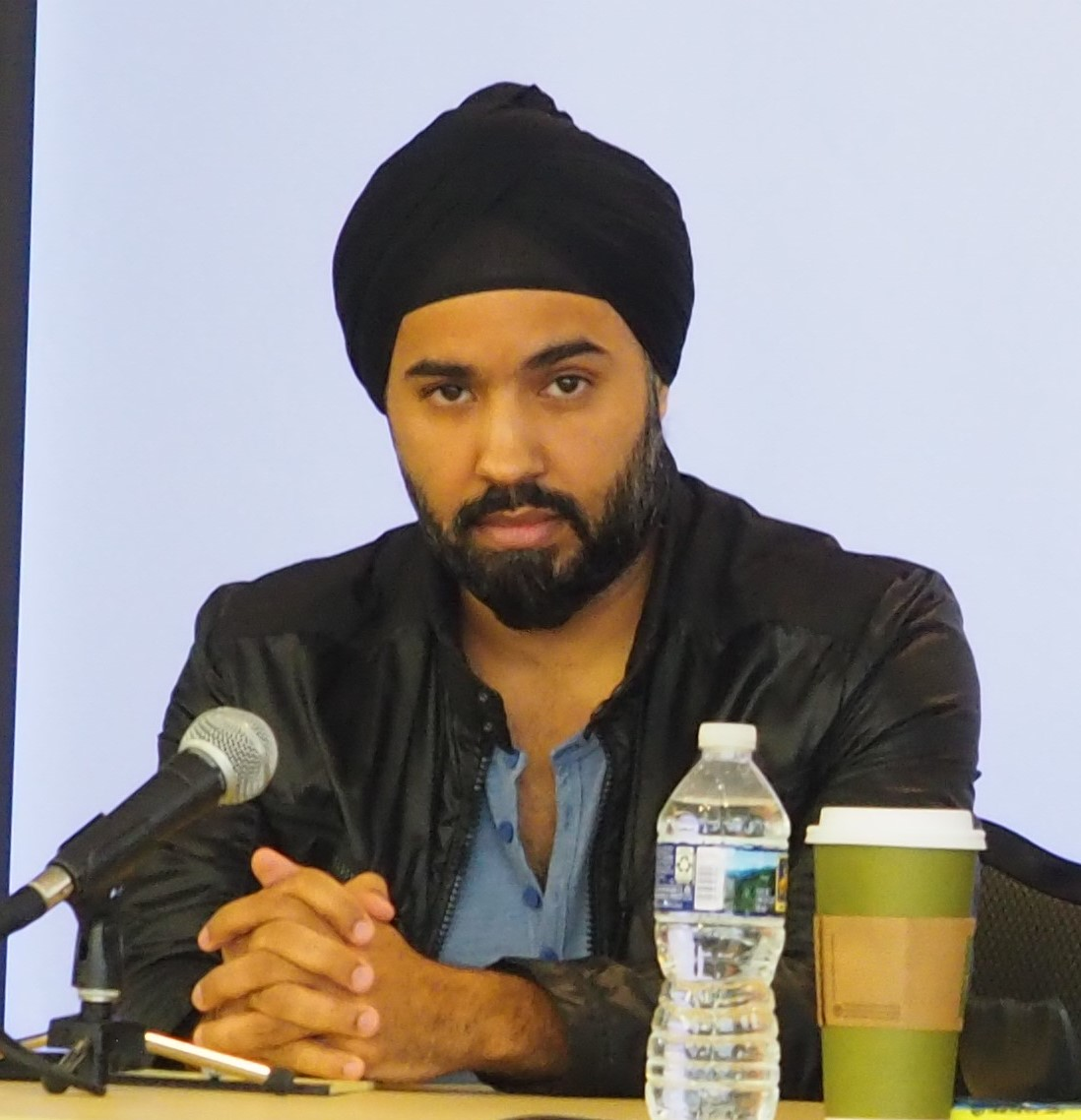
- Born: Virginia
- Education: B.S. Edmund A. Walsh School of Foreign Service at Georgetown University; J.D. New York University School of Law
- Alma mater: New York University; Georgetown University
- Occupations: Civil Rights Writer; Human Rights Lawyer; Adjunct Professor of Law at Georgetown University Law Center

Arjun Singh Sethi is an American civil and political rights writer, human rights lawyer, and adjunct professor of law at Georgetown University Law Center and Vanderbilt University Law School.

== Background and career ==
Sethi grew up in Virginia. His parents are Punjabi Sikhs originally from India. His family was one of the founding Sikh families in Virginia.

Sethi received his B.S. from the Edmund A. Walsh School of Foreign Service at Georgetown University in 2003 and his J.D. from the New York University School of Law in 2008. Sethi previously worked as an attorney with the international law firm of Covington & Burling in Washington D.C., and as the legislative counsel/policy advisor with the ACLU (American Civil Liberties Union), also in Washington, D.C. He has represented victims of domestic violence, asylum seekers, national security detainees, and criminal defendants on death row.

== Writing ==
Sethi is, according to CNN, "a frequent commentator on civil rights and social justice-related issues." The New York Times reports that he specializes in "counterterrorism and law enforcement," and he has been invited by the government to preview and assess numerous intelligence and law enforcement programs prior to launch. He is considered a subject-matter expert on racial and religious profiling. His essays on these subjects have appeared in The Washington Post, the Los Angeles Times, Politico Magazine, and in CNN. The Center for American Progress has recognized his work on these issues, noting that in "debates on national security, he has called out actions that stigmatize innocent groups, fan the flames of Islamophobia, and harm Muslim, Arab, and Sikh Americans."

His articles have appeared in Al Jazeera, Al Jazeera America, The Christian Science Monitor, CNN, The Guardian, The Huffington Post, the Los Angeles Times, Politico Magazine, USA Today, and The Washington Post.

On September 6, 2019, Sethi co-authored an op-ed, "The Gates Foundation Shouldn't Give An Award to Narendra Modi." The article was later cited by outlets across the world in connection with a global campaign calling upon The Bill and Melinda Gates Foundation to rescind its award to Prime Minister Modi.

== Books ==
In the wake of the 2016 US presidential election, Sethi traveled the country and documented the stories of people targeted by hate violence. NPR, Salon, Teen Vogue, Crooked Media, Center for Investigative Reporting, and other outlets interviewed him about the book. American Hate: Survivors Speak Out was named a 2018 Best Book of the Year by NPR & The Progressive. According to a review by Publishers Weekly, "This angry yet hopeful work is an important document of what the United States looks like to "the most vulnerable" among its people in 2018." Kirkus Reviews described it as a "useful book for those aiming to combat latter-day bigotry, with its many targets and manifestations."

== Censorship ==
On December 3, 2015, Al Jazeera America published Sethi's article, "Saudi Arabia Uses Terrorism As An Excuse For Human Rights Abuses." On December 18, 2015, The Intercept reported that the corporate headquarters of Al Jazeera had blocked access to the article, noting that the network had "told local press that it did not intend to offend Saudi Arabia or any other state ally, and would remove the piece." The Intercept republished Sethi's article in full. The censorship was covered by The Independent, The Times of India, Gawker, Jadaliyya, and other media outlets.

== Works ==
- Arjun Singh Sethi, ed. (July 2018). American Hate: Survivors Speak Out. The New Press. ISBN 9781620973714.
