= Richard A. Merrill =

American government official and university president

7th Dean of the University of Virginia School of Law
- In office 1980–1988
- Preceded by: Emerson Spies
- Succeeded by: Thomas H. Jackson

Personal details
- Born: May 20, 1937 Logan, Utah
- Died: October 26, 2017 (aged 80) Albemarle County, Virginia
- Education: Columbia University (BA, LLB)

Richard A. Merrill (May 20, 1937 – October 26, 2017) was an American lawyer, government official, and academic administrator who served as the 7th dean of the University of Virginia School of Law and the chief counsel of the Food and Drug Administration from 1976 to 1978.

== Biography ==
Merrill was born on May 20, 1937, in Logan, Utah. His father, Milton Reese Merrill, was a professor of political science and top academic administrator of Utah State University, becoming Vice President and Dean of the School of Commerce.

He graduated magna cum laude and phi beta kappa from Columbia University in 1959 and attended the University of Oxford as a Rhodes Scholar, earning a B.A. in 1961. He married Elizabeth "Lissa" Merrill in 1961 and moved to New York City to attend Columbia Law School, where he received a LL.B. and became the editor-in-chief of the Columbia Law Review.

Merrill clerked for Judge Carl McGowan on the D.C. Court of Appeals following graduation before joining the law firm Covington & Burling. In 1969, he joined the faculty of the University of Virginia School of Law, becoming associate dean from 1974 to 1975.

In 1975, the outgoing chief counsel of the Food and Drug Administration, Peter Hutt, who had known Merrill from Covington, recommended Merrill as his successor. He took a sabbatical from the law school to serve as chief counsel of the FDA from 1976 to 1978.

In 1980, he was selected to be the seventh Dean of the University of Virginia School of Law, a position he held until 1988. Following his deanship, he returned to full-time teaching and research. He returned to Covington & Burling as special counsel consulting on food and drug and other regulatory matters.

In 2007, Merrill retired from the law school. He died on Thursday, October 26, 2017, in Albemarle County, Virginia, from Parkinson's disease.
