= Phyllis D. Thompson =

American judge (born 1952)

Phyllis Thompson

Senior Judge of the District of Columbia Court of Appeals
- Incumbent
- Assumed office September 4, 2021

Associate Judge of the District of Columbia Court of Appeals
- In office 2006 – September 4, 2021
- Appointed by: George W. Bush
- Preceded by: John A. Terry
- Succeeded by: John P. Howard III

Personal details
- Born: October 1, 1952 (age 74) Washington, D.C., U.S.
- Education: George Washington University (BA, JD); Princeton University (MA)

Phyllis Diane Thompson (born October 1, 1952) is a Senior associate judge of the District of Columbia Court of Appeals.

== Biography ==
Thompson was born on October 1, 1952, in Washington, D.C. After earning a bachelor's degree in anthropology from George Washington University in 1974, she studied religion at Princeton University. She received her J.D. degree with high honors from George Washington University Law School in 1981. She then joined the law firm Covington & Burling, where she became the first African-American woman partner in 1989.

In 2006, Thompson was appointed to the D.C. Court of Appeals by President George W. Bush. Her term as Associate Judge expired on September 4, 2021.

Legal offices
Preceded by John A. Terry	Judge of the District of Columbia Court of Appeals; 2006–2021	Succeeded by John P. Howard III
