= John P. Howard III =

American judge (born 1984)

John Howard
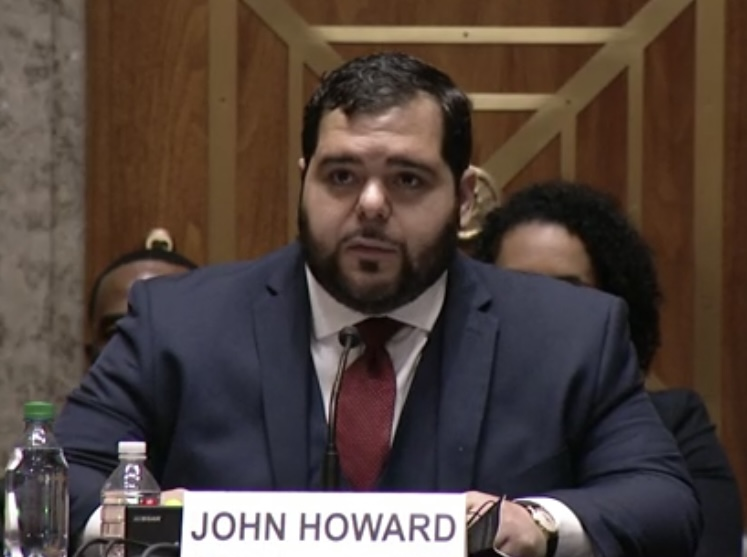

Associate Judge of the District of Columbia Court of Appeals
- Incumbent
- Assumed office February 18, 2022
- Appointed by: Joe Biden
- Preceded by: Phyllis D. Thompson

Personal details
- Born: John Peter Howard III; June 11, 1984 (age 40); Greenville, South Carolina, U.S.
- Education: Howard University (BA); Georgetown University (JD)

John Peter Howard III (born June 11, 1984) is an American lawyer who serves as an associate judge of the District of Columbia Court of Appeals. He previously served as an administrative law judge in Washington, D.C., from 2014 to 2022.

== Education ==
Howard earned his Bachelor of Arts from Howard University in 2006. He received his Juris Doctor from Georgetown University Law Center, which he attended as an Opportunity Scholar, in 2010.

== Career ==
Upon graduation from law school, Howard served as a law clerk to Judge Alexander Williams Jr. of the United States District Court for the District of Maryland and for Chief Judge David C. Simmons of the District of Columbia Commission on Human Rights. From 2012 to 2014, he practiced law as a sole practitioner and with a small firm, where he focused on civil litigation and family law. He served as an administrative law judge for the District of Columbia Commission on Human Rights from 2014 to 2018 and then from 2018 to 2022 served as an administrative law judge with the District of Columbia Office of Administrative Hearings. He is an adjunct faculty member at the Georgetown University Law Center.

== D.C. court of appeals service ==
=== Nomination under Trump ===
On June 25, 2020, President Donald Trump announced Howard to as a nominee to be an associate judge of the District of Columbia Court of Appeals to the seat vacated by Judge Kathryn A. Oberly who retired on November 1, 2013. His nomination was sent to the Senate the same day. On January 3, 2021, the nomination was returned. He was renominated the same day and that nomination was withdrawn on February 4, 2021, by President Joe Biden.

=== Renomination under Biden ===
On August 5, 2021, President Joe Biden renominated Howard to serve as an associate judge of the District of Columbia Court of Appeals. President Biden nominated Howard to the seat vacated by Judge Phyllis D. Thompson, whose term will expire on September 4, 2021. On December 2, 2021, a hearing on his nomination was held before the Senate Homeland Security and Governmental Affairs Committee. On December 15, 2021, his nomination was reported out of committee.

On February 2, 2022, the Senate invoked cloture on his nomination by a 62–34 vote. On February 8, 2022, the Senate confirmed his nomination by a 62–34 vote. He was sworn in by Chief Judge Anna Blackburne-Rigsby on February 18, 2022.

== Personal life ==
Howard and his wife, Brandi, have one child.

Legal offices
Preceded by Phyllis D. Thompson	Associate Judge of the District of Columbia Court of Appeals; 2022–present	Incumbent
