= Scott's Run Nature Preserve =

Nature preserve in Virginia, US

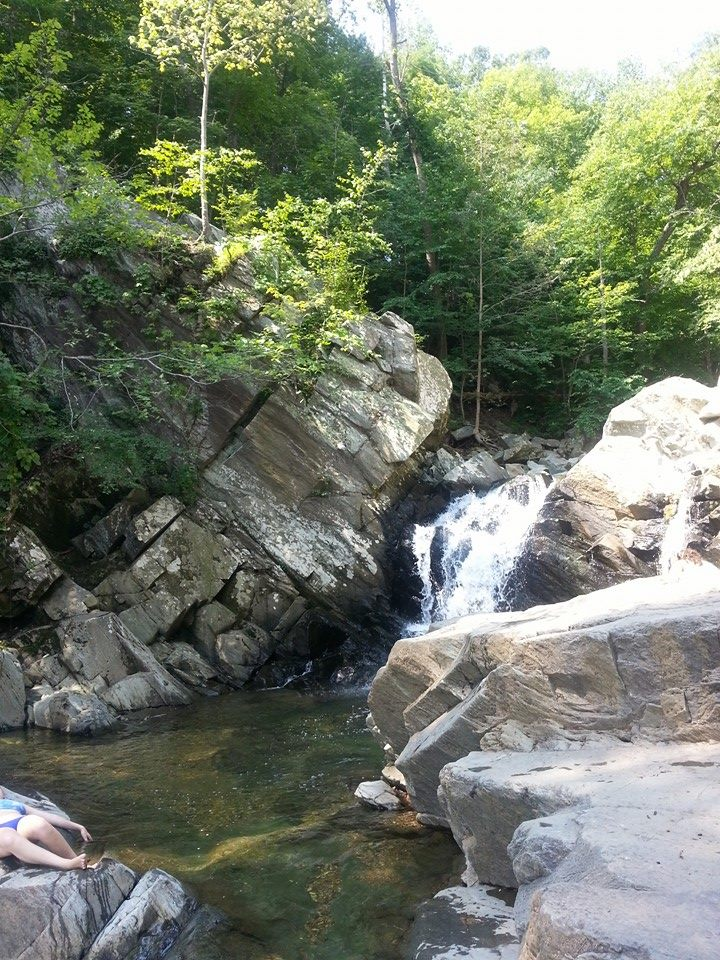
- Waterfall near the end of Scott's Run in the northwest corner of the park

- Location within Virginia Location within the United States
- Type: Nature preserve
- Location: Fairfax County, Virginia
- Nearest city: McLean
- Coordinates: 38°57′45″N 77°11′51″W
- Area: 336 acres (136 ha)
- Created: 1970
- Operator: Fairfax County Park Authority
- Open: One-half hour before sunrise to one-half hour after sunset
- Status: Open

Scott's Run Nature Preserve is a nature preserve in Fairfax County, Virginia, United States. Located in McLean, it is bordered by Virginia State Route 193 to its south, Interstate 495 to its east and the Potomac River to its north. It encompasses 336 acres (136 ha) of woodland with its namesake, Scott's Run, flowing through its west side. Scott's Run originates in nearby Tysons Corner and enters the Potomac on the northwest side of the preserve. The preserve is noted for including eastern hemlocks among its plant life, which are rare for the area. It is a popular destination for recreation and hiking and is operated by the Fairfax County Park Authority.

== History ==
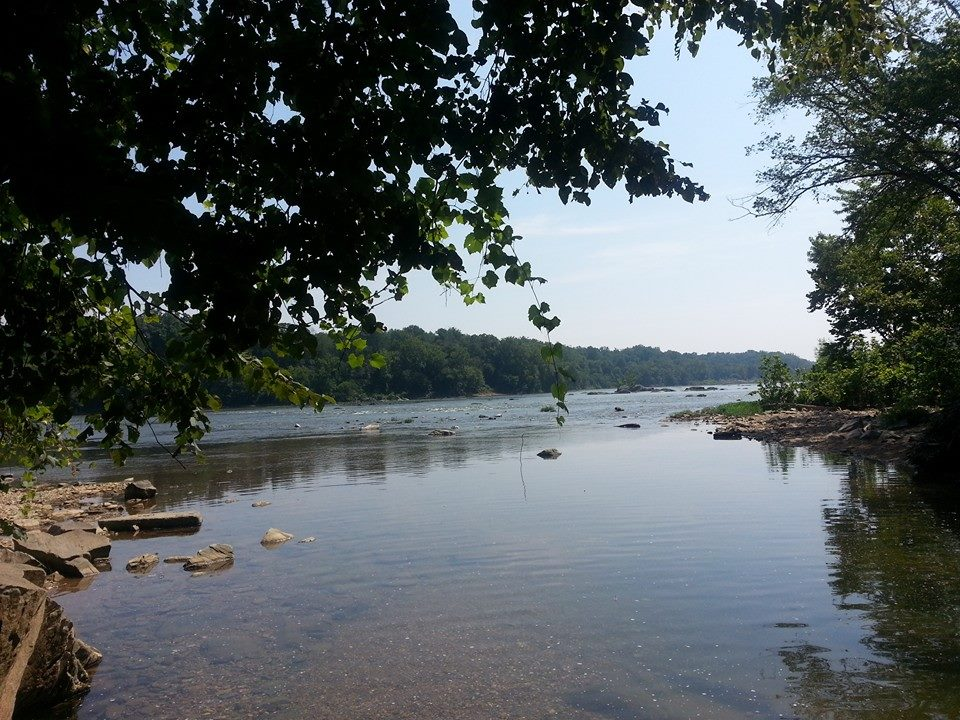
The confluence of Scott's Run with the Potomac River

Before the property was owned by Fairfax County, it belonged Edward B. Burling, a co-founder of the Covington & Burling law firm. During the 1920s Burling purchased the land for $200 an acre and built a cabin on the north side. He used the property for relaxation and informal business meetings.

After Burling's death in October 1966, his descendants sold the property to Miller & Smith Associates (MSA) to avoid its tax burdens. MSA planned to build 309 luxury homes on what was known as the "Burling Tract". Plans also included leaving 52 percent of the land relatively untouched. When Elizabeth Miles Cooke, who lived next to the tract, noticed it was slated for development, she help organize an opposition. After a lengthy debate between citizens, the Virginia Governor, several U.S. senators, developers, and local organizations, voters opted to raise their taxes in a referendum on July 14, 1970. The measure would secure $1.5 million in order to help purchase the land. An additional $1.5 million in funding was provided by the Department of the Interior and $0.6 million from state and local governments. On September 5, 1970, the tract was officially purchased by Fairfax County for $3.6 million.
