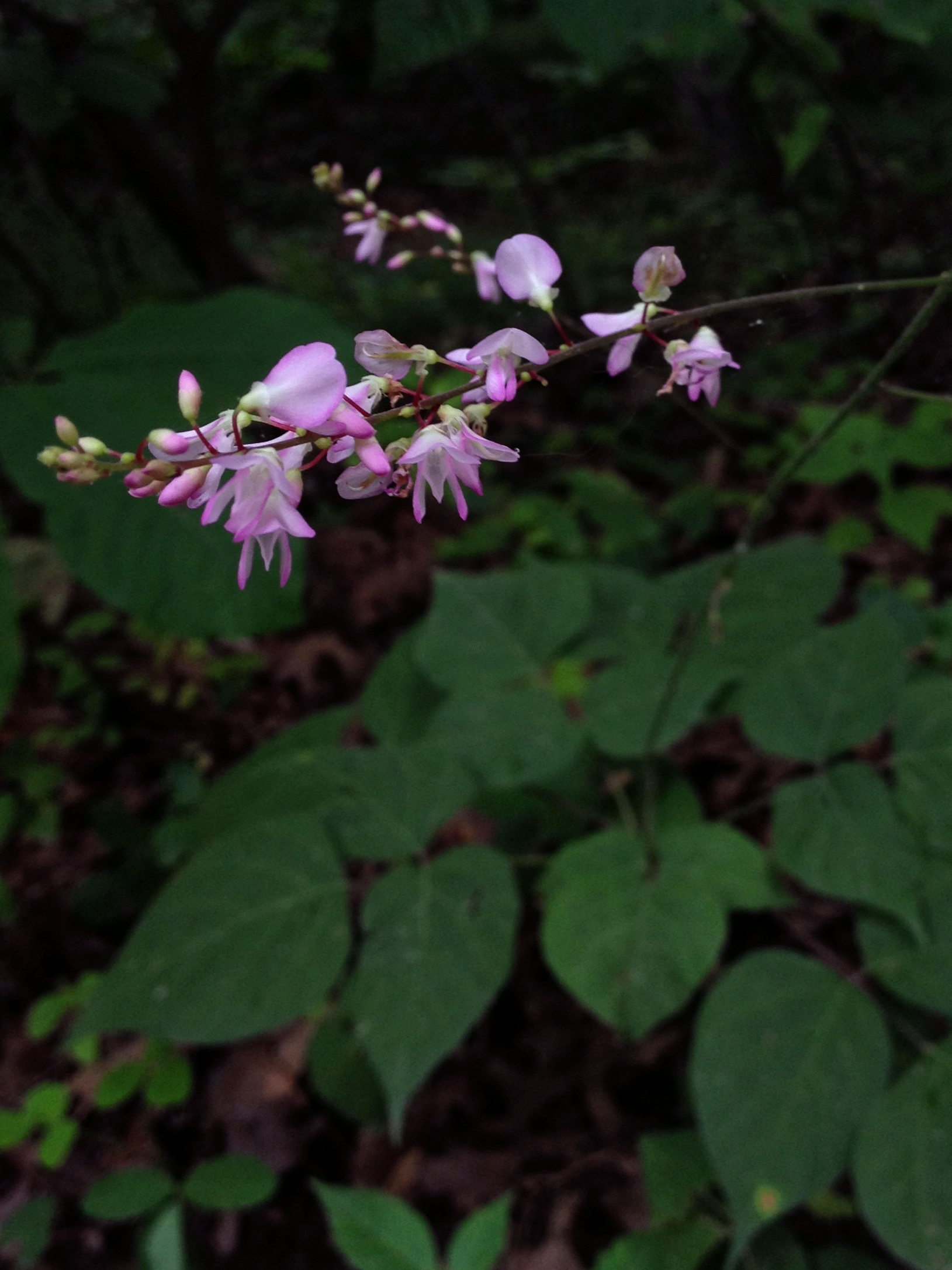
- In Fairfax County, Virginia

Scientific classification
- Kingdom: Plantae
- Clade: Tracheophytes
- Clade: Angiosperms
- Clade: Eudicots
- Clade: Rosids
- Order: Fabales
- Family: Fabaceae
- Subfamily: Faboideae
- Genus: Hylodesmum
- Species: H. glutinosum

Binomial name
- Hylodesmum glutinosum (Muhl. ex Willd.) H.Ohashi & R.R.Mill

Synonyms
- Hedysarum glutinosum Muhlenberg ex Willdenow; Desmodium acuminatum (Michaux) de Candolle; Desmodium glutinosum (Mühlenberg ex Willdenow) Alph.Wood

= Hylodesmum glutinosum =

Species of legume

Hylodesmum glutinosum is a species of flowering plant in the family Fabaceae. Common names include large tick-trefoil, clustered-leaved tick-trefoil, large-flowered tick-clover, pointed tick-trefoil, beggar's lice and pointed-leaved tick-trefoil. It occurs in eastern Canada, the central and eastern United States, and northeastern Mexico.

== Taxonomy ==
First described in 1802 as Hedysarum glutinosum and sometimes considered part of the genus Desmodium, it was transferred to the new genus Hylodesmum (tribe Desmodieae) in 2000.
