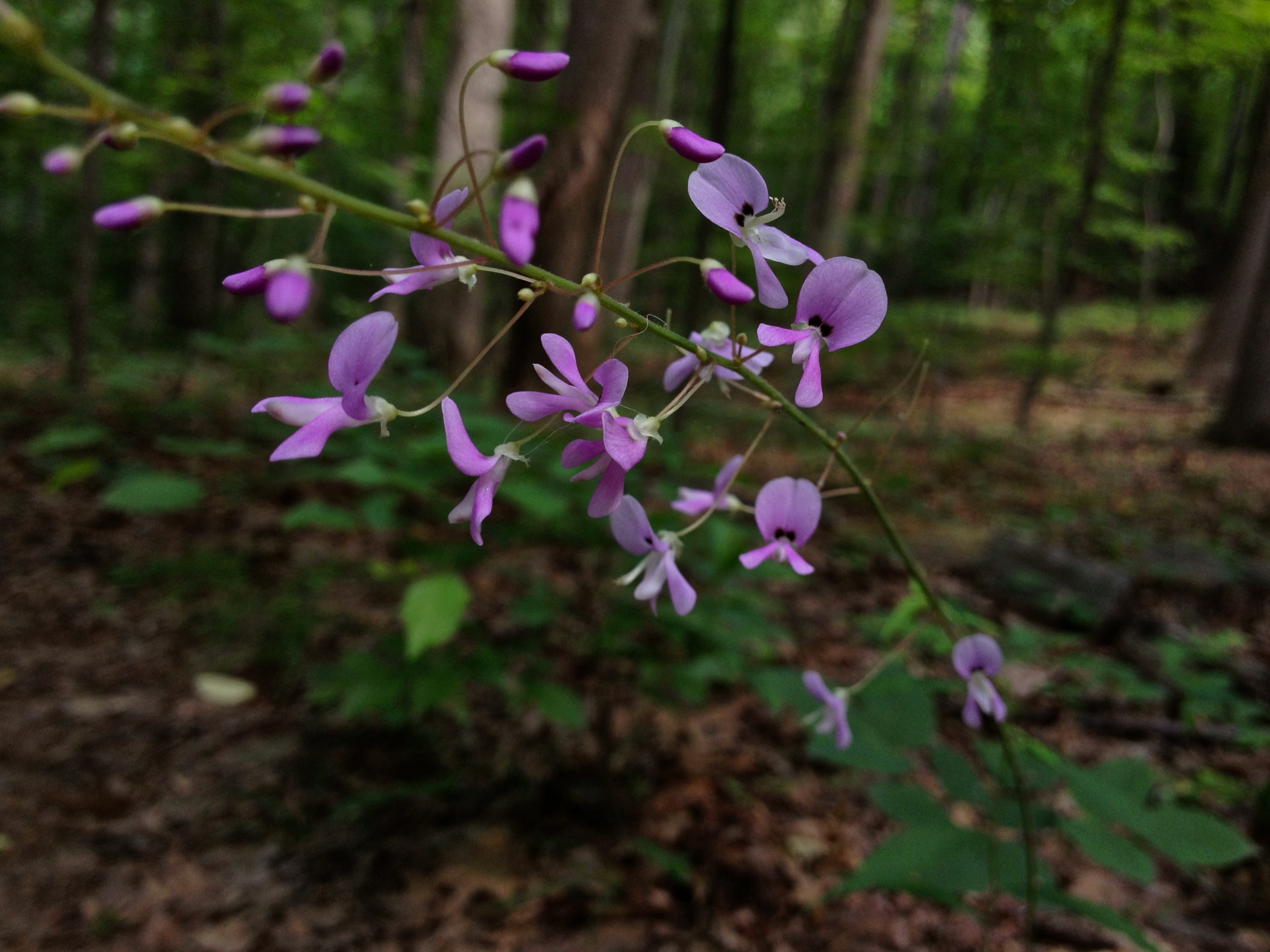
- Hylodesmum nudiflorum, nakedflower ticktrefoil

Scientific classification
- Kingdom: Plantae
- Clade: Tracheophytes
- Clade: Angiosperms
- Clade: Eudicots
- Clade: Rosids
- Order: Fabales
- Family: Fabaceae
- Subfamily: Faboideae
- Tribe: Desmodieae
- Subtribe: Desmodiinae
- Genus: Hylodesmum; H.Ohashi & R.R.Mill (2000)

Synonyms
- Papilionopsis Steenis (1960); Podocarpium (Benth.) Yen C.Yang & P.H.Huang (1979)

= Hylodesmum =

Genus of legumes

Hylodesmum is a genus of flowering plants in the family Fabaceae, sometimes called ticktrefoils or tick-trefoils. It is sometimes treated as part of Desmodium. It includes 16 species native to eastern North America, sub-Saharan Africa, Yemen, south, southeast, and eastern Asia, Malesia, and New Guinea.

== Species ==
Species in Hylodesmum include:

- Hylodesmum densum (C.Chen & X.J.Cui) H.Ohashi & R.R.Mill
- Hylodesmum duclouxii (Pamp.) Y.F.Deng
- Hylodesmum glutinosum (Muhl. ex Willd.) H.Ohashi & R.R.Mill
- Hylodesmum lancangense (Y.Y.Qian) X.Y.Zhu & H.Ohashi
- Hylodesmum laterale (Schindl.) H.Ohashi & R.R.Mill
- Hylodesmum laxum (DC.) H.Ohashi & R.R.Mill
- Hylodesmum leptopus (A.Gray ex Benth.) H.Ohashi & R.R.Mill
- Hylodesmum longipes (Franch.) H.Ohashi & R.R.Mill
- Hylodesmum menglaense (C.Chen & X.J.Cui) H.Ohashi & R.R.Mill
- Hylodesmum nudiflorum (L.) H.Ohashi & R.R.Mill
- Hylodesmum oldhamii (Oliv.) H.Ohashi & R.R.Mill
- Hylodesmum pauciflorum (Nutt.) H.Ohashi & R.R.Mill
- Hylodesmum podocarpum (DC.) H.Ohashi & R.R.Mill
- Hylodesmum repandum (Vahl) H.Ohashi & R.R.Mill
- Hylodesmum taiwanianum S.S.Ying
- Hylodesmum williamsii (H.Ohashi) H.Ohashi & R.R.Mill
