= Covington & Burling =

U.S. law firm based in Washington, D.C.

Covington & Burling LLP
- Headquarters: 850 Tenth Street, NW; Washington, D.C., U.S.
- No. of offices: 10
- Offices: Global
- No. of attorneys: 1,210 (2024)
- Major practice areas: Transactional, litigation, regulatory, and public policy matters
- Key people: Douglas G. Gibson, Peter Koski
- Date founded: 1919; 107 years ago
- Company type: Limited liability partnership
- Website: cov.com

Covington & Burling LLP is an American multinational law firm. Known as a white-shoe law firm, it is headquartered in Washington, D.C. and advises clients on transactional, litigation, regulatory, and public policy matters. The firm has additional offices in the United States, as well as in Belgium, China, England, Germany, South Africa, South Korea, and United Arab Emirates.

== History ==
Judge J. Harry Covington and Edward B. Burling founded Covington & Burling in Washington, D.C., on January 1, 1919.

Early partners included George Rublee, an adviser to Presidents Woodrow Wilson and Franklin Roosevelt, while Secretary of State Dean Acheson joined as an associate in 1921. The firm gained recognition through international arbitration, including its representation of Norway in a dispute with the United States. A wave of New Deal legislation in the 1930s increased corporate demand for legal experts in regulatory matters. This helped the firm build a reputation in areas such as economic and product regulation. After World War II, the firm grew rapidly. Antitrust litigation became a major part of its practice, alongside other regulatory fields. Covington also handled several historically significant cases, including the Steel Seizure Case, a border dispute between Cambodia and Thailand, and United States v. Maine, in which the firm represented Atlantic coastal states in a dispute with the federal government over ownership of the continental shelf. It also established a lawyer rotation program with Neighborhood Legal Services, formalizing its commitment to pro bono work.

From the 1980s onward, Covington, the firm expanded internationally and across the United States. Between 1988 and 2023, the firm opened offices in London, Brussels, San Francisco, Beijing, Palo Alto, Seoul, Shanghai, Los Angeles, Dubai, Johannesburg, Frankfurt, and Boston.

Covington & Burling has had several prominent alumni and partners enter public service, including Judge Michael Boudin and Eric Holder, who became U.S. Attorney General in 2009 under President Barack Obama and later returned to the firm.

In 2026, the firm was listed as #12 among the Vault Law 100, and ranked as #1 best law firm in Washington D.C. It has been described by Vault as a "brain trust" law firm which "attracts intellectuals" who "thrive on collaboration, hard work, and giving back via pro bono matters."

=== Targeting by the second Trump administration ===
On February 25, 2025, President Donald Trump revoked security clearances held by employees of the Covington & Burling law firm, citing its provision of pro bono legal services to former Special Counsel Jack Smith, the prosecutor in two criminal cases charging Trump, both of which were dropped following the results of the 2024 election. Smith had received $140,000 in free legal services from the firm, according to a January 10 disclosure by his office. Politico reported that at least two attorneys at the firm, Peter Koski and Lanny Breuer, have represented Smith.

== Notable clients and cases ==
Litigation and corporate clients of Covington & Burling have included Alps Electric, Citibank, JP Morgan, National Football League, AmerisourceBergen, Cardinal Health, Inc., McKesson Corporation , Disney, Bytedance, the Democratic National Committee, and the U.S. Olympic and Paralympic Committee.

Covington has also represented and advised sovereigns, such as Australia, Norway, Jordan, Lithuania, Ukraine and Vietnam, as well as several U.S. states.

In 2025, Covington represented The Professional Services Council in submitting a brief to the Supreme Court in support of The GEO Group, a private prison company. The brief was filed in support of The GEO Group in The GEO Group, Inc. v. Menocal, a lawsuit in which the company faced allegations of forced labor at an ICE detention facility.

=== State of California ===
The government of California hired Covington & Burling attorney and former Obama Attorney General Eric Holder to represent the state in legal matters related to actions of the first Donald Trump administration.

=== Commonwealth of Australia ===
According to press reports and filings with the U.S. Department of Justice under the Foreign Agents Registration Act, following the enactment of the U.S.-Australia Free Trade Agreement, Covington & Burling assisted the government of Australia in pursuing the legislation to create a new visa category reserved exclusively for nationals of Australia. The Covington team included Stuart Eizenstat, Martin Gold, Roderick DeArment, David Marchick, Elizabeth Letchworth, Les Carnegie, and Brian Smith. On November 20, 2012, the LegalTimes reported that the Embassy of South Korea had hired Covington & Burling to advise on a similar visa for Korea. Covington of counsel Brian Smith and senior international policy adviser Alan Larson reportedly led the matter, assisted by senior counsel Martin Gold and associate Jonathan Wakely.

== Pro bono work ==
Covington has been ranked twelve times as having the number one pro bono practice in the U.S. by The American Lawyer.

The firm's pro bono work focuses significantly on providing legal services to local communities in need. Attorneys at the firm may participate in a six-month rotation program and work at each of three D.C.-based legal service organizations: Neighborhood Legal Services Program, the Children's Law Center, and Bread for the City.

Covington's pro bono work at the U.S. Supreme Court includes representation in Buckley v. Valeo, Griffin v. Illinois, and Korematsu v. United States. They supported the District of Columbia in District of Columbia v. Heller, arguing that the District's ban on the possession of handguns and its storage provisions for other firearms in the home is not implicated by the Second Amendment. The firm successfully represented the University of California Board of Regents in its efforts to protect DACA in Department of Homeland Security v. Regents of the University of California, when the Trump Administration first sought to rescind the program.

Covington has also provided pro bono representational services to individuals facing investigations, criminal proceedings, and detainment, including Nobel Peace Prize laureate Maria Ressa and death row inmates in the United States. The firm also advised special counsel Jack Smith in the aftermath of his prosecution of President Donald Trump. After Trump became president for the second time in 2025, the Trump administration retaliated against Covington by withdrawing the security clearances of staff at the law firm.

Covington's pro bono international legal work has included the obtainment of settlements on behalf of global trade unions against multinational fashion brands, resulting in more than US$2.3 million being allocated to remediate unsafe conditions in Bangladeshi garment factories. The firm also produces country-level human rights reports for submission to United Nations bodies and other institutions.

=== Representation of Guantanamo Bay inmates ===
Attorneys at Covington & Burling have been Guantanamo Bay attorneys for Ahmed al-Ghailani, fifteen Yemenis, one Pakistani, and one Algerian being held at Guantanamo Bay. The firm obtained favorable rulings that detainees have rights under the Fifth Amendment and the Geneva Conventions. The court ruled in March 2005 that the government could not transfer detainees from Guantanamo Bay to foreign custody without first giving the prisoners a chance to challenge the move in court.

According to an annual pro bono survey of The American Lawyer, Covington attorneys spent 3,022 hours on Guantanamo litigation in 2007, "the firm's largest pro bono project that year".

Covington also co-authored one of three petitioner briefs filed in Boumediene v. Bush "and was responsible for several detainee victories" in the U.S. Court of Appeals for the D.C. Circuit, although they did not participate in litigation over the Guantanamo Bay prison.

== Current and former attorneys ==
- David Campion Acheson
- Dean Acheson
- Donald Alexander
- Richard S. Arnold
- Howard Berman
- Alan Bersin
- Stephanos Bibas
- John R. Bolton
- Kit Bond
- Michael Boudin
- Steven G. Bradbury
- Lanny Breuer
- William Bundy
- Edward B. Burling
- Bruno Campos
- Vince Girdhari Chhabria
- Abram Chayes
- Michael Chertoff
- W. Graham Claytor, Jr.
- Christopher Reid Cooper
- John Sherman Cooper
- J. Harry Covington
- Malik R. Dahlan
- Roderick Allen DeArment
- Joan Donoghue
- John W. Douglas
- John C. Dugan
- Stuart E. Eizenstat
- Leecia Eve
- Adrian S. Fisher
- Roger Fisher
- Ivan K. Fong
- Gerhard Gesell
- Haywood Stirling Gilliam, Jr.
- Jack L. Goldsmith
- Lino Graglia
- James Hamilton
- Coleman Hicks
- Donald Hiss
- Elie Honig
- Eric Holder
- Charles Antone Horsky
- Philip K. Howard
- Nicholas Johnson
- Michael Karlan
- Yale Kamisar
- Harold Hongju Koh
- Alex Kozinski
- Jon Kyl
- Robert D. Lenhard
- Robert Lighthizer
- Eugene Ludwig
- Kenneth W. Mack
- Gerard Magliocca
- David Marchick
- Burke Marshall
- James C. McKay
- David E. McGiffert
- Roderick R. McKelvie
- Terrell McSweeny
- Richard A. Merrill
- Richard Meserve
- Sandra Douglass Morgan
- Alfred H. Moses
- David Nason
- Dawn Clark Netsch
- Kevin Newsom
- John W. Nields Jr.
- John Lord O'Brian
- Mary Ellen O'Connell
- Roberts Bishop Owen
- Skye Perryman
- David Remes
- Gary R. Roberts
- George Rublee
- Charles Ruff
- Albert Sacks
- Arjun Singh Sethi
- Andrew J. Shapiro
- Brad Smith
- Paul Tagliabue
- Phyllis D. Thompson
- Jamar K. Walker
- Paul Warnke
- Togo D. West, Jr.
- Josh Whitman
- Sarah L. Wilson
- Wesley S. Williams Jr.
- Joshua Wolson
- Robert Eric Wone
- Diane Wood
