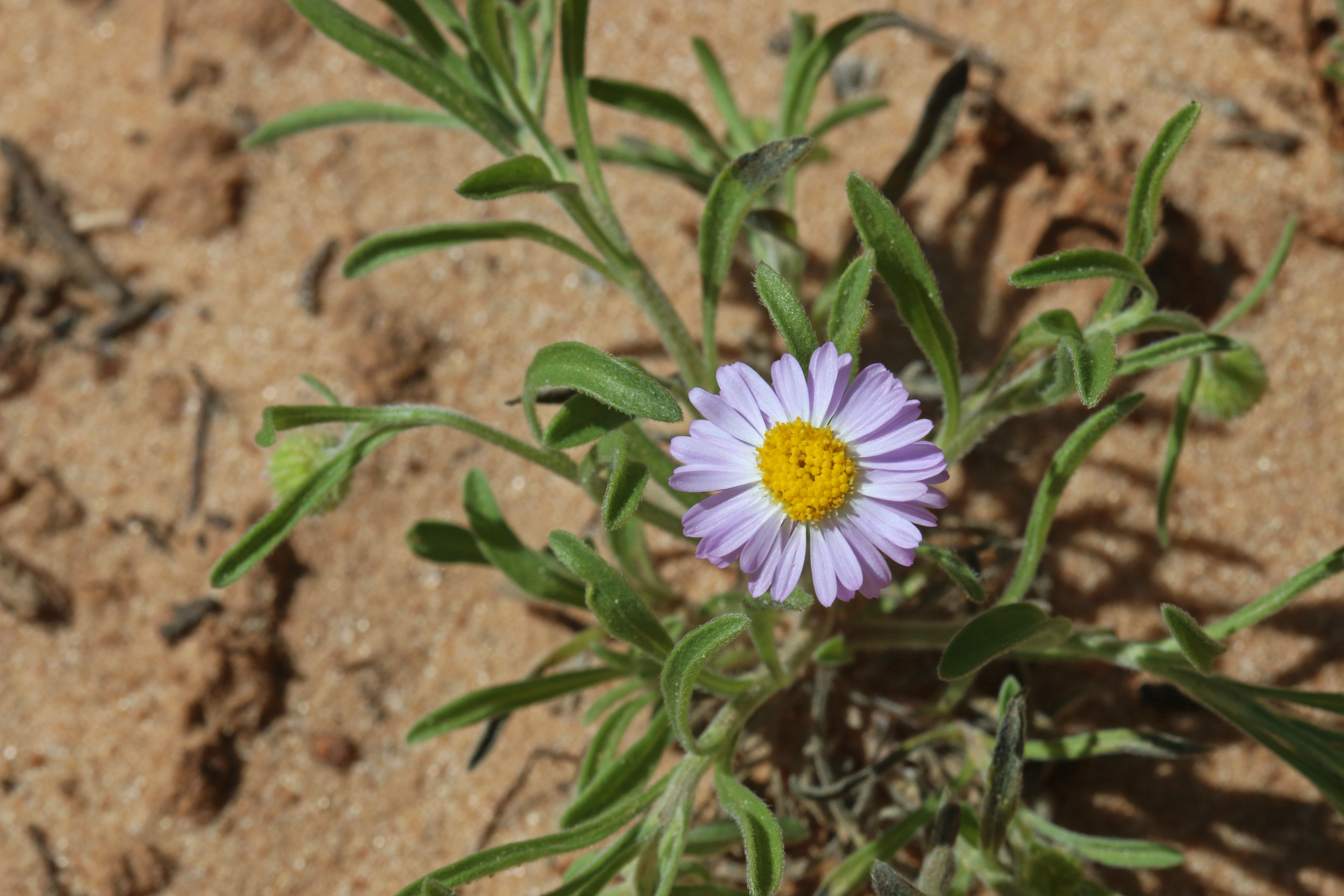

Conservation status
- Secure (NatureServe)

Scientific classification
- Kingdom: Plantae
- Clade: Tracheophytes
- Clade: Angiosperms
- Clade: Eudicots
- Clade: Asterids
- Order: Asterales
- Family: Asteraceae
- Genus: Erigeron
- Species: E. bellidiastrum

Binomial name
- Erigeron bellidiastrum Nutt.

Synonyms
- Erigeron eastwoodiae Wooton & Standl.; Erigeron arenarius Greene, syn of var. arenarius

= Erigeron bellidiastrum =

Species of flowering plant

Erigeron bellidiastrum, the western daisy fleabane or sand fleabane, is a species of fleabane in the family Asteraceae. It is native to northern Mexico (state of Chihuahua) and the western and central United States (western Great Plains and open sandy areas in the deserts west of the Rockies).

Erigeron bellidiastrum is an annual or biennial herb up to 50 cm (20 inches) tall, with a taproot. It produces flower heads in groups of 1–12 on the ends of branches. Each head can have up to 70 white ray florets surrounding many small disc florets.

Varieties

- Erigeron bellidiastrum var. arenarius (Greene) G.L.Nesom - New Mexico, Texas, Chihuahua).
- Erigeron bellidiastrum var. bellidiastrum - Arizona, Colorado, Kansas, Montana, Nebraska, New Mexico, Oklahoma, South Dakota, Texas, Utah, Wyoming
- Erigeron bellidiastrum var. robustus Cronquist - Colorado, Kansas, Nebraska, New Mexico, Oklahoma, Texas
