= Roderick Allen DeArment =

United States Deputy Secretary of Labor
- In office 1989–1989
- President: George H. W. Bush
- Preceded by: Dennis Eugene Whitfield

Personal details
- Born: March 3, 1948 (age 78) Fort Sill, Oklahoma, U.S.
- Party: Republican
- Education: Trinity College (BA); University of Virginia School of Law (JD)
- Occupation: Lawyer

Roderick Allen DeArment (born March 3, 1948) was nominated to be United States Deputy Secretary of Labor under President George H. W. Bush in 1989.

Education

DeArment graduated from Trinity College (B.A., 1970) and the University of Virginia School of Law (J.D., 1973).

== Career ==
Prior to his service at the Department of Labor, DeArment had been a partner with a law firm in Washington, DC. He was chief of staff for the Senate majority leader, Bob Dole's, office, 1985 - 1986. He has served in several capacities for the Senate Committee on Finance, including chief counsel and staff director, 1983–1984; deputy chief counsel, 1981–1984; and deputy chief minority counsel, 1979 - 1981. From 1973 to 1979, DeArment was an associate in a law firm in Washington, DC.

== Sources ==
The Library of President George H.W. Bush
