= Cornell University Department of History =

Academic department at Cornell University

- Parent institution: College of Arts and Sciences
- Chairperson: Sandra Greene
- Location: McGraw Hall, Ithaca, New York, U.S.
- Website: history.cornell.edu

The Cornell University Department of History is an academic department in the College of Arts and Sciences at Cornell University that focuses on the study of history. Founded in 1868, it is one of Cornell's original departments and has been a center for the development of professional historical research institutions in the United States, including the American Historical Association and the American Historical Review. It remains a highly ranked program in the field and its alumni and faculty have won Nobel and Pulitzer Prizes, among other distinctions. In addition, three of Cornell's presidents have served among its ranks.

== History ==
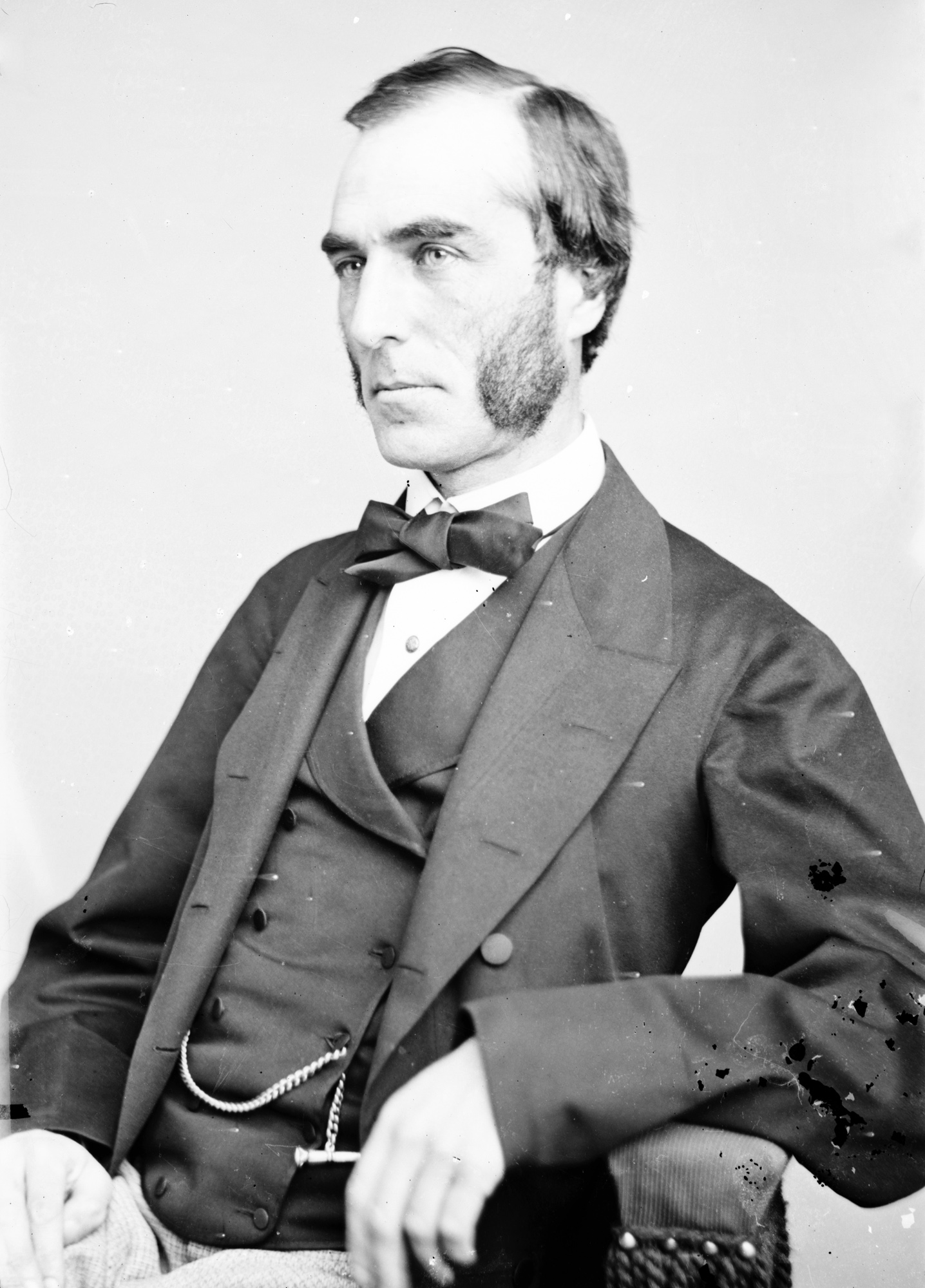
Goldwin Smith, an early historian who taught at Cornell

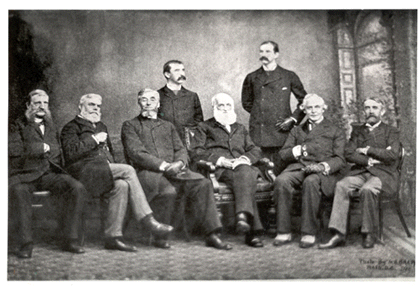
Executive officers of the American Historical Association at the time of the association's incorporation by Congress, photographed during their annual meeting on December 30, 1889, in Washington, D.C. Charles Kendall Adams sits left of center and Andrew Dickson White sits on the far right.

The department was founded in 1868 by President Andrew Dickson White as one of Cornell's original departments as the Department of History and Political Science. White had already earned a reputation as an up-and-coming historian, having taught at the University of Michigan as a professor of History and English Literature from 1857 to 1863 and as a lecturer of history from 1863 to 1867, while serving as a New York State Senator. Employing his reputation as a well-regarded historian in his own right, White attracted other notable and rising historians of the day to his department. He convinced Goldwin Smith to leave his comfortable post at Oxford and travel across the Atlantic to rural, upstate New York. When Smith realized just how lacking the new university's library was for historical study, he promptly had his entire 3,400 book collection shipped from England for donation to the Cornell University Library and made a $2,500 bequest for the purchase of more historical works. From the College of Horace Mann (later known as Antioch College), White attracted their Department Chairman William Channing Russel. Russel would later serve as the department chairman, Cornell's vice president and acting president during White's long periods abroad.

In 1881, the department notably hired the first, full-time chair of American history ever. In the spring of 1872, non-resident professor George Washington Greene, grandson of American Revolutionary War General Nathanael Greene, offered a series of lectures on American history. Upon Russel's stepping down as the department chairman in 1881, the department attracted Moses Coit Tyler from the University of Michigan to take Russel's position. At Tyler's request, he exclusively taught American history .

In 1884, the department founded the American Historical Review in a joint effort with Harvard's Department of History in the model of the English Historical Review and the French Revue Historique. Also in 1884, Professors White and Charles Kendall Adams founded the American Historical Association with a handful of other leading historians of the day and both would later serve as its president. Other Cornellians to head the American Historical Association include faculty members Carl L. Becker and Mary Beth Norton, as well as alumni Robert Roswell Palmer and William Leuchtenburg.

In 1887, the department was renamed the President White School of History and Political Science in honor of Andrew Dickson White's service to the university and the donation of his large personal library. Over the summer, the board of trustees nominated White, who was no longer university president, to be Dean of the school and Honorary Lecturer on History and Political Science, but White declined the offer. Soon thereafter, president Charles Kendall Adams, White's protégé, sought a younger dean and interviewed Woodrow Wilson and Herbert Baxter Adams for the position. Adams notably did not interview the older Moses Coit Tyler, current department chairman, or Herbert Tuttle, an associate professor, to much annoyance of Taylor and the faculty in general. The trustees eventually overrode Adams and installed Tyler as Dean.

On June 18, 1891, the Cornell Board of Trustees resolved that steps be taken to form a Department of History, Political and Social Science, and General Jurisprudence and the following year, the faculty of economics and finance and political and social institutions broke off into a single department separate from the White School. As the history and government departments were moved around campus over the next few decades, the White School became a more informal grouping of the two departments. In September 1932, Cornell revived the White School by moving the two disconnected departments to Boardman Hall, allocating space for three classrooms, administrative offices, and graduate student areas. White's will stipulated that on the death of his daughter (Karin A. White), his estate would be used to maintain the President White School. As the school no longer existed when she died in 1971, trustees used the funds to endow a professorship in history.

== Reputation ==
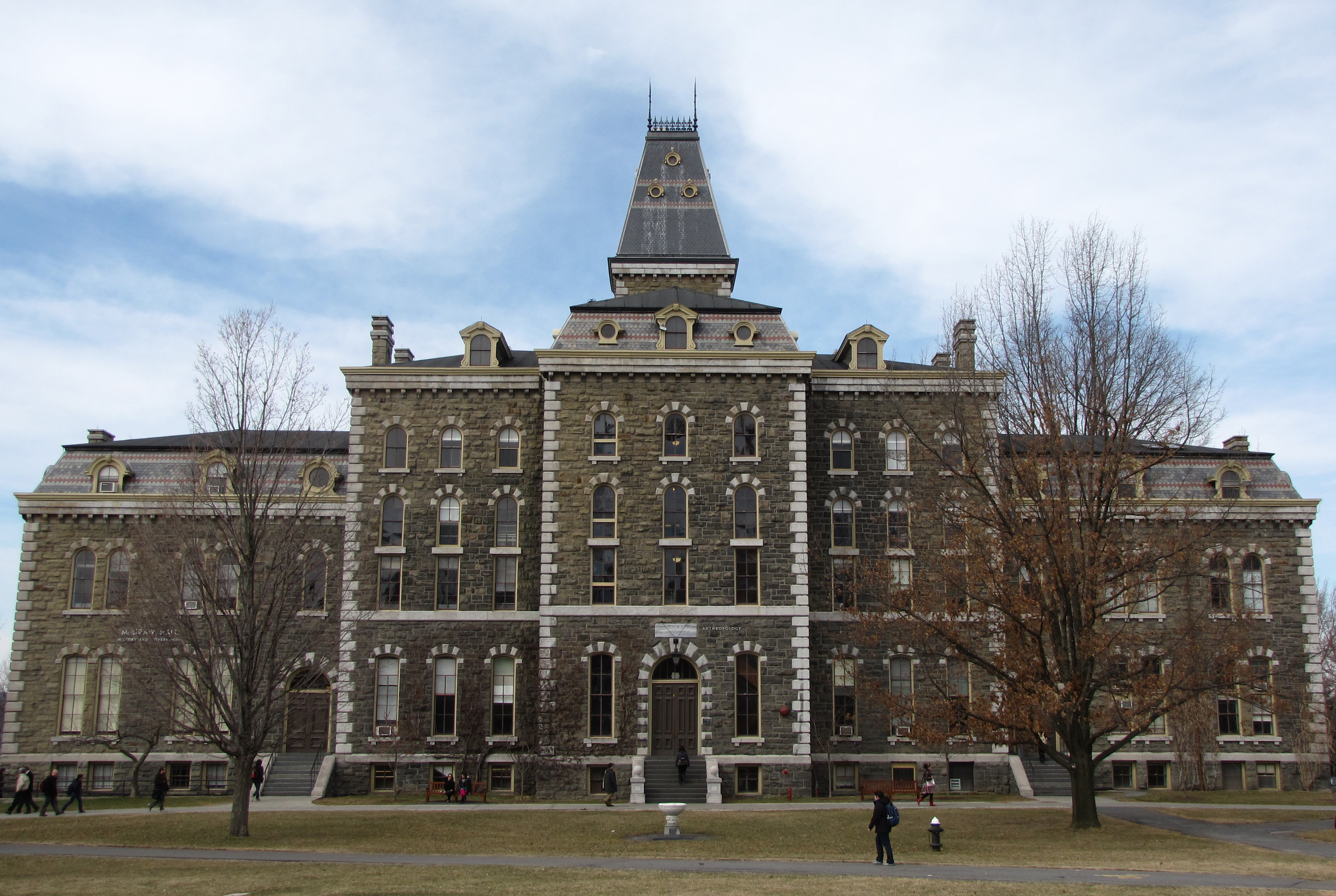
The department's main offices are in McGraw Hall on the Arts Quad on the campus of Cornell University

In 2017, U.S. News & World Report's rankings of graduate programs placed the department 11th overall in the United States.

Many alumni and faculty members have won major awards for their work as historians. Alumnus Robert Fogel was the co-recipient of the 1993 Nobel Prize in Economics, in recognition of his quantitative historical analyses. Walter LaFeber won the Bancroft Prize in 1996 and David Brion Davis won in 1976. LaFeber also won the Beveridge Award in 1962 and Davis received it in 1975. The French government awarded Steven Kaplan the Ordre national du Mérite and named Henry Guerlac Chevalier de la Légion d'Honneur. Anthony Grafton won the Balzan Prize.

Numerous people associated with the department have won Pulitzer Prizes. Former faculty member Fredrik Logevall was the recipient of the 2013 Pulitzer Prize for History. Michael Kammen was the 1973 winner of the prize. Professor David Brion Davis won in the category of General Nonfiction in 1969. Alumnus David Oshinsky won the award for History in 2006, and alumna Sheryl WuDunn won the award for International Reporting in 1990.

Alumnus John Mott was the co-recipient of the 1946 Nobel Peace Prize for his work as the head of the YMCA.

Two buildings at Cornell's main campus are named in honor of history department professors. White Hall, one of the original three buildings on the Arts Quad, named after Andrew Dickson White, and Becker House, a residential college named after Carl L. Becker in recognition of his pedagogical contributions to the Cornell community.

== Department in popular culture ==
The Onion, a parody newspaper, featured an article about fictional History Department professor Wallace Schroeder on September 9, 1997, titled "Byzantine Empire Will Fall To Turks, Historian Warns".

In The Office, salesman Andy Bernard minored in history at Cornell.

== Notable people ==
=== Faculty ===
The department's first faculty included university president Andrew Dickson White and English historian Goldwin Smith. In 1881, the department named Moses Coit Tyler the first professor of American history in the United States. Three of Cornell's twelve presidents have been members of the department: Andrew Dickson White, Charles Kendall Adams, and Hunter R. Rawlings III. The longest teaching member of the faculty was Frederick Marcham who, upon completing his graduate work at Cornell in 1924, continued lecturing until a month before his death in 1992 – a total of 68 years.

==== Current faculty ====
The following is only a partial list.

Name	Title	Field of study	Year joined department	Reference
Edward Baptist	Professor	19th-century United States, slavery, History of Capitalism		
Maria Cristina Garcia	Howard A. Newman Professor of American Studies	United States, immigrants, refugees		
Lawrence Glickman	Professor	American consumerism	2014	
Sandra Greene	Stephen '59 and Madeline '60 Anbinder Professor of African History, Department Chairperson	West Africa		
Isabel V. Hull	John Stambaugh Professor of History	Germany, political theory, sexuality, international law	1977	
Louis Hyman	Maurice and Hinda Neufeld Founders Professor in Industrial and Labor Relations	History of Capitalism		
Tamara Loos	Professor, Department chairwoman	Southeast Asia		
Mary Beth Norton	Mary Donlon Alger Professor of American History	United States	1971	
Russell Rickford	Associate Professor	African-American history, American social movements	2014	
Aaron Sachs	Professor	American environmental history	2005	
Barry S. Strauss '1974	Bryce and Edith M. Bowmar Professor in Humanistic Studies	Classics	1979	
Eric Tagliacozzo	John Stambaugh Professor of History	Southeast Asia	1999	
Rachel Weil	Professor	Gender and culture in 17th- and 18th-century England		

==== Former faculty and faculty emeriti ====
Name	Title(s)	Field of study	Year joined	Year left/retired	Reference
Felix Adler	Professor of Hebrew and Oriental Literature and History	Hebrew and Chinese literature	1874	1876	
Charles Kendall Adams	Professor of History, University President	Europe	1885	1889	
Daniel A. Baugh	Associate Professor of History	Modern England, Maritime history	1969	?	
Carl L. Becker	John Wendell Anderson Professor of History	The Enlightenment	1917	1941	
Knight Biggerstaff	Professor of History, Department Chairman (1956–1963)	China	1938, 1946	1944, 1972	
George Lincoln Burr '1881	John Stambaugh Professor of History	Middle Ages	1888	1923	
Sherman Cochran	Hu Shih Professor of Chinese history	China	1974	2012	
David Brion Davis	Ernest I. White Professor of History	Slavery	1955	1969	
Frank Fetter '1892	Instructor, professor in political economy (and finance)	Political economy, finance	1895	1911	
Paul Wallace Gates	John Stambaugh Professor of History, department chairman (1946–56)	United States public land policy	1936	1971	
Anthony Grafton	Instructor in history	Renaissance	1974	1975	
George Washington Greene	Non-resident Professor	United States	1871	1875	
Henry Guerlac	Goldwin Smith Professor of the History of Science	Science	1946	1977	
D. G. E. Hall	Visiting professor of Southeast Asian History	Southeast Asia	1967	1972	
Jeremiah Jenks	Professor of Political Economy and Politics	Political economy	1891	1912	
Chen Jian	Hu Shih Professor of History and China-US Relations	Modern China, Chinese-American relations, Cold War history	2005	2017	
Donald Kagan	Professor of History	Classics	1960	1969	
Michael Kammen	Newton C. Farr Professor of American History and Culture	American culture	1965	?	
Steven Kaplan	Goldwin Smith Professor of History	France, bread	1969	?	
Helmut Koenigsberger	Professor	Early modern Europe	1966	1973	
J. Victor Koschmann	Professor	Japan			
Dominick LaCapra '1961	Bryce and Edith M. Bowmar Professor of Humanistic Studies	Intellectual history	1969	2013	
Walter LaFeber	Andrew H. and James S. Tisch Distinguished University Professor, Department Chairman	United States foreign policy, Cold War	1959	2006	
Max Ludwig Wolfram Laistner	John Stambaugh Professor of History, Department Chairman	Middle Ages	1925	1941	
Fredrik Logevall	John S. Knight Professor of International Studies	United States foreign relations	2010	2015	
Allan Nevins	?	American history	~1930	~1931	
Benzion Netanyahu	Professor	Judaic Studies	1971	1975	
Wallace Notestein	Goldwin Smith Chair of English History	England	1920	1928	
Richard Polenberg	Marie Underhill Noll Professor of American History, Goldwin Smith Professor of American History, Department Chairman (1977–1980)	United States constitutional law	1966	2012	
William Provine	Andrew H. and James S. Tisch Distinguished University Professor, Charles A. Alexander Professor	Science	1969	?	
Hunter Rawlings	Professor of Classics and History, President Emeritus	Classics	1995	?	
Andrew Roberts, Baron Roberts of Belgravia	Merrill Family visiting professor	England	2014	2014	
Takashi Shiraishi '1986	Professor	Southeast Asia	1987	1998	
Joel H. Silbey	President White Professor of History	19th century American history	1966	2002	
Goldwin Smith	Professor of English and General Constitutional History	England	1868	1871	
Preserved Smith	Professor in History	Protestant Reformation	1923	1941	
H. Morse Stephens	Professor of Modern European History	Modern Europe	1894	1903	
Carl Stephenson	Professor in History	Middle Ages	1931	1941	
Brian Tierney	Goldwin Smith Professor of Medieval History; Bowmar Professor of Humanistic Studies	Middle Ages	1959	????	
Herbert Tuttle	Professor of Modern European History	Modern Europe	1890	1894	
Moses Coit Tyler	Professor of American History, Department Chairman (1881–?1887), White School Dean (1887-?)	United States	1881	1900	
Andrew Dickson White	Professor, Department Chairman (1868–1881), University President	Science, warfare, religion	1868	1887	
Walter Francis Willcox	Professor of Political Economy and Statistics, Dean of the College of Arts and Sciences (1901–1907)	Political economy, statistics	1891	1931	
L. Pearce Williams '1948	John Stambaugh Professor of the History of Science, Department Chairman	Political economy, statistics	1960	?	
O. W. Wolters	Goldwin Smith Professor of Southeast Asian History	Southeast Asia	1964	1990	
David K. Wyatt '1966	John Stambaugh Professor of History and Asian Studies, Department Chairman	Southeast Asia	1969	2002	

=== Alumni ===
==== Undergraduate alumni ====
Note: Does not include those who have become faculty in the department, who are denoted by class year above, or those who also earned graduate degrees from the department, noted below.

Name	Class year	Notability	Reference
Tom Allon	1984	Media entrepreneur	
Eric Alterman	1982	Liberal author and columnist	
Jim Axelrod	1985	National Correspondent and reporter for CBS News	
George Lincoln Burr	1881	U.S. historian, diplomat, author, and educator	
Barber Conable	1942	United States Congressman New York 37th District, 1965–73; 35th District, 1973–83; 30th District, 1983–85; President of the World Bank, 1986–91	
Ann Coulter	1984	Conservative author and political commentator	
S.E. Cupp	2000	Political television host	
Eric Daniels	1973	CEO of Lloyds Banking Group	
Ken Dryden	1968	Hockey Hall of Fame goaltender; Member of the Canadian Parliament	
Eric Edelman	1972	U.S. Ambassador and Under Secretary of Defense for Policy	
Robert Fogel	1948	Nobel Prize-winning economic historian	
David Folkenflik	1991	Reporter at National Public Radio	
Marie Gottschalk		Political scientist at the University of Pennsylvania focused on mass incarceration	
Karen Greenberg		Director of the Center on National Security at Fordham Law School	
Barbara Herman	1966	Professor of philosophy and law at UCLA	
Fredric Hobbs	1953	Artist and filmmaker	
Mark Kirk	1981	Congressman, Illinois 10th District, 2001–2010, Senator, Illinois 2010–2017.	
Stephen D. Krasner	1963	Former Director of Policy Planning at the United States Department of State, professor at Stanford University	
William Leuchtenburg	1943	Leading scholar on Franklin Delano Roosevelt, professor at University of North Carolina at Chapel Hill	
Hendrik Willem van Loon	1905	Author of the first book to be awarded the Newbery Medal for an outstanding contribution to children's literature, historian, educator	
Bill Maher	1978	Political pundit, host of Real Time with Bill Maher	
Linda A. Mason	1976	Co-founder and President of Bright Horizons Family Solutions	
John R. Mott	1888	Nobel Peace Prize recipient (1946), YMCA and World Student Christian Federation leader	
Elizabeth Neuffer	1978	Journalist with the Boston Globe who specialized in covering war crimes	
Clifford Orwin	1967	Professor of Jewish political thought at the University of Toronto	
David Oshinsky	1965	Historian, professor, winner of the 2006 Pulitzer Prize for History	
Kenneth Pomeranz	1980	Historian, president of the American Historical Association	
Elijah Reichlin-Melnick	2006	Politician, Member of the New York State Senate from the 38th district	
Kirkpatrick Sale	1958	Independent scholar and author who has written prolifically about political decentralism, environmentalism, luddism and technology	
Joseph M. Schwartz		Political scientist and social theorist; professor at Temple University	
Alan Silverstein	1970	Rabbi, author	
Robert Saxton Taylor		Library scholar and information scientist, dean of the Syracuse University School of Information Studies	
Matt Urban	1941	The most decorated American serviceman, according to the Guinness Book of World Records	
Sheryl WuDunn	1981	Journalist at The New York Times, co-winner in 1990 of the Pulitzer Prize for her coverage on the Tiananmen Square protests of 1989, winner of the George Polk Award in 1989, and winner of the Overseas Press Club in 1990	

==== Graduate alumni ====
Name	Class year	Degree	Notability	Reference
Glenn C. Altschuler	1976	Ph.D.	Historian and administrator at Cornell	
Barbara Watson Andaya	1975	Ph.D.	Historian of Southeast Asia at the University of Hawaii at Manoa	
Leonard Andaya	1971	Ph.D.	Southeast Asia Historian	
Stanley Chodorow	1968	Ph.D.	Medieval historian; Academic administrator	
Frank Fetter	1892	M.Phil.	Influential Austrian School economist	
Federico Finchelstein	2006	Ph.D.	Chair of the history department and professor at the New School for Social Research	
Louis R. Gottschalk	1919, 1920, 1921	B.A., M.A., Ph.D.	Historian of Marquis de Lafayette and the French Revolution, President of the American Historical Association	
Douglas Greenberg	1971, 1974	Ph.D.	Historian, academic administrator	
Marie Boas Hall	1949	Ph.D.	Historian of science	
Charnvit Kasetsiri	1972	Ph.D.	Former Rector of Thammasat University	
Kevin M. Kruse	2000	Ph.D.	Professor of American history at Princeton University, focusing on urban and suburban history and the history of conservatism	
Mary Ting Yi Lui	2000	Ph.D.	Professor at Yale University focusing on Asian American Studies	
Leonard Marsak	1957	Ph.D.	Historian of Modern Europe	
Anthony Milner		Ph.D.	Historian of Southeast Asia at Australian National University	
L. Arthur Minnich	1948	Ph.D.	Eisenhower White House staff and historian	
William Hardy McNeill	1947	Ph.D.	Historian, professor, author of The Rise of the West: A History of the Human Community	
Milton Osborne		Ph.D.	Australian historian, author, and consultant specializing in Southeast Asia	
Joseph Palermo	1998	Ph.D.	Historian of U.S. 20th-century politics at Sacramento State University	
Robert Roswell Palmer	1934	Ph.D.	Historian of 18th-century France at Princeton and Yale, winner of the Bancroft Prize, President of the American Historical Association	
Chiranan Pitpreecha		B.A., M.A.	Thai poet and feminist	
Vicente L. Rafael	1984	Ph.D.	Professor of history at University of Washington	
Merle Calvin Ricklefs	1973	Ph.D.	Former professor of history at National University of Singapore	
Carol M. Rose	1969	Ph.D.	Ashby Lohse Chair in Water and Natural Resources at the University of Arizona James E. Rogers College of Law, former professor at Yale Law School	
James M. Stayer	1995, 1998	M.A., Ph.D.	Professor at New School for Social Research	
Jeremy Varon	2000	Ph.D.	Author, activist, research on indigenous peoples at the University of Victoria	
Waziyatawin	2000	Ph.D.	Author, activist, research on indigenous peoples at the University of Victoria	
David K. Wyatt	1966	Ph.D.	Historian, professor, authority on Thai	

== External links and further reading ==
- Department homepage
- Landmarks of Tompkins County, New York, a history of the department
- - a The Cornell Daily Sun article from October 19, 1887, regarding the founding of the President White School of History and Political Science
- Another extensive history of the first 40 years of the department
