= L. Pearce Williams =

American academic

- Born: September 8, 1927
- Died: February 8, 2015 (aged 87)

Academic background
- Education: Cornell University

Academic work
- Institutions: Yale University; University of Delaware; Cornell University

Leslie Pearce Williams (September 8, 1927 – February 8, 2015) was a chaired professor at Cornell University's Department of History who also chaired the department for many years. He was the founder, in the mid-1980s, of Cornell's program in the History and Philosophy of Science and Technology, which later became part of the Department of Science and Technology Studies.

== Early life and career ==
After a brief period of volunteering in the United States Navy, Williams began a career in chemical engineering in 1945. He found his lifelong passion because of a required course in History of Science, taught by the late Henry Guerlac. He then switched his major and graduated from Cornell University with honors in 1949. He then pursued a Ph.D. at Cornell, which he completed in 1952, with a dissertation entitled, “Scientific education in France during the revolutionary and imperial periods, 1789-1815.” He taught at Yale University and the University of Delaware, and returned to teach at his alma mater in 1960, where he soon held the John Stambaugh Chair in History of Science.

Under his birth name of Leslie Greenberg, he experienced the rejection of partial or spousal Jewish religious identity by different gatekeepers in Israel and America in the first decade after World War II. In 1948, he and his brother Charlie, who graduated from Cornell in 1944, were not accepted to volunteer with the new State of Israel's army because they were only half-Jewish, which meant that they were not Jewish under Jewish religious law. A few years later, when anti-Semitism was denying employment for his wife and Cornell classmate, Sylvia Alessandrini, he and his brother legally changed their family name from Greenberg to their mother's family name, Williams. [_{ref.}cornell.edu -"L. Pearce Williams Memorial Statement" by Bruce V. Lewenstein, issued by Cornell University Office of the Dean of the University Faculty, 2015.]

== Career ==
His biography of Michael Faraday won the Pfizer Award in 1966. At that time most work in the history of science was focused on the scientific revolution of the 17th century and the 18th century spread of Newtonian philosophy; biographies of 19th century figures, other than Charles Darwin, were still rare. Williams studied both Faraday's philosophical journals and laboratory notebooks, and suggested that Faraday, along with the little known Jesuit philosopher Roger Boscovich, played an important role in the origins of field theory. He went on to defend this thesis in a book on the origins of field theory. Williams was fond of pointing out that James Clerk Maxwell, generally understood to be the author of field theory, publicly attributed the idea to Faraday in a series of lectures in the 1870s. Williams (like his Cornell colleague E.A. Burtt, his mentor Henry Guerlac, and the émigré historian of science Alexandre Koyré) paid close attention to the "extra-scientific determinants of scientific thought", especially the religious views of important scientists. This was notable not least because Williams himself was, as he often said to friends and students (see below) "a reluctant atheist." He advanced the thesis that electromagnetic field theory in 19th century physics owed a great philosophical debt to the speculative metaphysical movement in early 19th century Europe known as "Naturphilosophie." This view, now commonplace if not universally accepted, was quite radical at the time Williams first advanced it. At the end of his career he was at work in extending these insights concerning the complex interplay of science and philosophy in a biographical study of André-Marie Ampère, which remained unfinished at the time of his death. He authored several other books, numerous articles in his field, and dozens of scholarly reviews. He also served on the board of editors for The Dictionary of Scientific Biography, Studies in History and Philosophy of Science, Physis, and Rivista della Storia della Scienza.

In the philosophy of science his views were closely aligned with those of his friend and contemporary Norwood Russell Hanson on the interpenetration of theory language and observation language in physics. He was fundamentally opposed to the theory of scientific revolutions proposed by Thomas Kuhn, finding it philosophically incoherent in its presentation and irrational in its implications.

=== Teaching and reputation ===
A tall and imposing figure, he reveled in the teaching of both the History of Science and the History of Western Civilization, and enjoyed giving his presentation, "The Notorious Note-Taking Lecture," to students entering the university. A showman, he attracted standing-room-only crowds to his Western Civ lectures, speaking without notes for 50 minutes that combined abstract and profound concepts with an unusual ability to play to the peanut gallery. His portrayals of James I and Rousseau, along with many others, made lasting impressions on generations of Cornell undergraduates, winning him the Clark Teaching Award in 1971 from the College of Arts and Sciences. He cared particularly about the success of student athletes and devoted many hours to tutoring them privately. He oversaw the dissertations of dozens of graduate students, who were each welcomed into his home as well as into his professional life. Sunday touch football games with graduate students and colleagues were regular high points in his weekly life.

He often expressed his opinions on various issues to The Ithaca Journal and The Cornell Daily Sun, gaining him a certain local notoriety, or fame, depending on one's point of view. An outspoken conservative in politics - in the mold of Tocqueville, de Maistre, and Edmund Burke - he urged caution with regard to large initiatives fostered by central governments, believing, with most conservatives that humans learn principally by making mistakes and that big governments generally make big mistakes. Today his politics would probably be described as libertarian, and he put great emphasis on independence in thought and action and on individual initiative. Williams, along with E. A. Burtt and 23 other Cornell University professors, was a volunteer faculty member of Ithaca Neighborhood College.

Williams was a courageous advocate for justice throughout his entire life. Early on in his college career, he met the son of the famous African American singer, Paul Robeson, Paul Robeson Jr., aka "Paulie". When he took Robeson to his home in Croton-on-Hudson, the local swim club refused Robeson entrance because of his race; Williams succeeded in getting the swim club shut down until it changed its policies. He was elected chair of the History Department at the height of racial tensions on campus in 1969, and insisted that both rigorous, open-minded inquiry and high standards be the principles guiding any changes at Cornell. He was a leading advocate of maintaining ROTC on the Cornell campus, of compulsory physical education, and of removing Dale Corson as Cornell President because of an alleged decline in academic standards. As chair, he fought hard for the hire of the first woman in the department, Dr. Mary Beth Norton. He did not care at all about the race, creed, gender, or sexual orientation of anyone he worked with; he wanted the sharpest and most intellectually curious people he could get to belong to the department and to lead Cornell University.

Williams was, above all, a presence, intellectually, morally and physically. His physical activities included hunting with his Weimaraner dogs, earning a black belt in karate in his 50s, playing touch football, and wood chopping, a benefit of which was his many hours spent by his fireside. His powers of concentration were extraordinary; he usually wrote with opera playing, children talking, phones ringing and dogs barking.

A self-described reluctant atheist, Williams nevertheless wanted the last words of his obituary to come from the New Testament: "I have fought a good fight, I have finished my course, I have kept the faith," (2 Timothy 4:7 King James Version).

== Works ==
- Michael Faraday, a biography (1965, 1987), Chapman & Hall
- The origins of field theory (1966, 1980), Random House
- Relativity theory; its origins and impact on modern thought (1968, 1979), John Wiley & Sons
- The nineteenth century (1978), Scribner
- The history of science in Western civilization (1978), authored with Henry John Steffens, University Press of America, 1977, Volumes I, II, and III
- Great issues in Western Civilization. Random House, 1967 and 1972. Volumes I and II. Eds. Brian Tierney, Donald Kagan, and L. Pearce Williams.
- "Normal Science, Scientific Revolutions and the History of Science" (pages 49–50) in Criticism and the Growth of Knowledge: Proceedings of the International Colloquium in the Philosophy of Science, London, 1965, Editors Imre Lakatos and Alan Musgrave, Cambridge University Press, 1970, ISBN 0-521-09623-5, 282 pages
- Historiography of Victorian Science (1966) (paper)
