= Moses Coit Tyler =

American journalist and historian (1835–1900)

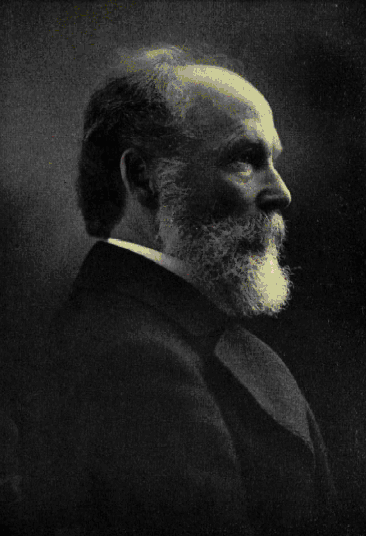
Moses Coit Tyler

Moses Coit Tyler (August 2, 1835 – December 28, 1900) was an American author and the first full university professor of American history.

== Biography ==
Born in Griswold, Connecticut, Tyler and his family moved several times during his childhood, first to Constantia, New York, and then to various locations in Michigan before settling in Detroit in 1842. There, he attended the First Congregational Church. In 1850, at age 15, he became a schoolteacher in Romeo, Michigan. The next year he became a bookseller in Chicago.

He entered the University of Michigan in 1852, but a relative from Connecticut financed his transfer to Yale University the following year. He graduated with an A.B. in 1857 and an A.M. in 1863. During his senior year, he met Andrew Dickson White at a Skull and Bones meeting. This became a lifelong personal and professional friendship.

Tyler studied for the Congregational ministry at the Yale Divinity School (1857–1858) and Andover Theological Seminary (1858–1859). His first pastorate was at a Congregationalist church in Owego, New York (1859–1860), before moving to a larger congregation in Poughkeepsie in 1861. Following a nervous breakdown in 1862, he spent six months at Boston's Normal Institute for Physical Education, where he became a disciple of Diocletian Lewis and his calisthenic training regimens. After his recovery, he settled in England and established himself as a lecturer and essayist, initially as an evangelist for Lewis' musical gymnastics before transitioning to studying and contrasting American and British society.

In 1867, he became professor of English language and literature at the University of Michigan. He held that position until 1881, except for a brief period when he was literary editor of The Christian Union (1873–1874). His disgust with the Beecher-Tilton Scandal case sent him back to Michigan. He was elected to the American Antiquarian Society in 1879.

For much of the 1870s, Andrew Dickson White had been promoting the study of American history at Cornell University, having hired George Washington Greene, William C. Russell, Hermann E. Von Holst, and John Fiske in various roles as visiting professors and lecturers. In 1881, White secured funding for a permanent professorship and hired his old college friend Tyler, who turned down an offer from Columbia University, at double the salary. From 1881 until his death, Tyler served as professor of American history and chairman of the Department of History. This was the first full professorship of American history. Though he was ordained as a deacon in the Protestant Episcopal Church in 1881 and as a priest in 1883, he never undertook regular parochial work.

== Work ==
Beginning with his first stay in England in the 1860s, Tyler advocated for establishing formal studies of American literature and history. At the University of Michigan, while employed as an English professor, he proposed American literature and history be added to the curriculum. He was self-taught as a historian, and placed high importance on collection and use of primary sources, including

After noting that White and Cornell had arranged for George Washington Greene to be a visiting professor of American history in the early 1870s, he wrote a series of letters to Andrew White and Benson Lossing on the subject, and proposing himself as a permanent professor of American history at Cornell. Cornell's recent acquisition of Jared Sparks' library made Cornell a desirable institution for the aspiring American historian.

Most important among his works are his valuable and original History of American Literature during the Colonial Time, 1607-1765 (2 vols, 1878; revised in 1897), and Literary History of the American Revolution, 1763-1783 (2 vols, 1897). Supplementary to these two is his Three Men of Letters (1895), containing biographical and critical chapters on George Berkeley, Timothy Dwight and Joel Barlow.

In addition he published:

- The Brawnville Papers (1869), a series of essays on physical culture
- a revision of Henry Morley's Manual of English Literature (1879)
- Christianity and Manliness (1885), essay
- In Memoriam: Edgar Kelsey Apgar (1886), privately printed
- Patrick Henry (1887), a biography in the "American Statesmen" series
- Glimpses of England; Social, Political, Literary (1898), a selection from his sketches written while abroad.

Among his students at Cornell were Charles Hull (who succeeded him at Cornell as Professor of American History) and Charles A. Beard.

His papers are archived at the Cornell University Library. Selections were published by his daughter in 1911.

== Personal life ==
In 1862, at the request of his cousin, Dr. Daniel T. Coit of Boston, he adopted the name "Coit" as his middle name.

He married Jeannette Gilbert of New Haven, and had three children: Jessica, Edward, and Ned. He spent many professional years and holidays away from them.

== Legacy ==
Tyler House, located within the East Quad dormitory on the University of Michigan's Central Campus, is named in his honor.
