= Steven Kaplan (historian) =

American academic of European history (born 1943)

Steven Laurence Kaplan (born January 23, 1943) is professor emeritus and former Goldwin Smith Professor of European History in the Department of History at Cornell University. He has held visiting positions in Germany, Italy, Belgium and France. His primary fields of expertise are French history, the history of markets, economic regulation, and political economy, the history of work and apprenticeship, aspects of the French Revolution, and the history of food, specifically the history of bread, the grain trade and provisioning.

== Biography ==
Kaplan graduated summa cum laude in History from Princeton University in 1963. While at Princeton, Kaplan was a student of John William Ward and Charles C. Gillispie. He then attended the Université de Poitiers in 1964 on a Fulbright scholarship. He received M.A. (1966), M.Phil. (1968) and Ph.D. (1974) degrees from Yale University.

Kaplan joined the Cornell University History Department as Assistant Professor of European History in 1970; he was promoted to Associate Professor in 1976 and Full Professor in 1980. In 1990, he was named Goldwin Smith Professor of European History, a post he held until he became emeritus professor in 2011. Kaplan was the founder (1995) and inaugural Director of the Program in French Studies at Cornell University. From 2003-2010, Kaplan spent one semester per academic year as professor of Early Modern French and European History at the Université de Versailles Saint-Quentin.

He has held numerous visiting professorships, including at the Ecole Pratique des Hautes Etudes, Quatrième Section, the Collège de France (1986), the European University Institute in Florence, Tuscany, Italy (1987), the École Nationale des Chartes (2001, 2002), Sciences Po Paris (2002, 2010, 2013), the École Normale Supérieure, Lyon (2002), the Vrije Universiteit Brussel (1995), the University of Lille (2000) and the Maison européenne des sciences humaines et sociales de Lille (2009), and the École Pratique des Hautes Etudes, Sixième Section, re-organized as the School for Advanced Studies in the Social Sciences (EHESS) in Paris in 1981.

== Books ==
- Transmettre, Soumettre, Socialiser: Essai sur l'Apprentissage de Colbert à la Grande Guerre. Paris, Fayard, 2023.
- Pour Le Pain. Paris: Fayard, 2020.
- The Economic Turn: Recasting Political Economy in Enlightenment Europe. Co-ed. with Sophus Reinert. London: Anthem, 2018.
- Raisonner sur les blés: Essais sur les lumières économiques, 1763-1774. Paris: Fayard, 2017
- Bread, Politics and Political Economy in the Reign of Louis XV. 2 volumes. The Hague: Martinus Nijhoff, 1976. (Second edition, London: Anthem, 2016)
- The Stakes of Regulation: Perspectives on Bread, Politics and Political Economy Forty Years Later. London: Anthem, 2015.
- La France et son pain: histoire d’une passion. Entretiens avec Steven L. Kaplan. Paris: Albin Michel, 2010.
- Le pain maudit. Retour sur la France des années oubliées, 1945-1958. Paris: Fayard, 2008.
- Learning on the Shop Floor: Historical Perspectives on Apprenticeship. Co-ed with Bert de Munck and Hugo Soly. Oxford: Berghahn Books, 2007.
- Good Bread is Back: A Contemporary History of French Bread, The Way it is Made, and the People Who Make It. Raleigh, NC: Duke University Press, 2006. Translation of Le Retour du bon pain.
- France, Malade du Corporatisme? Co-edited with P. Minard. Paris: Belin, 2004.
- Cherchez le pain: Guide des Meilleures Boulangeries de Paris. Paris: Plon, 2004.
- Le Retour du bon pain: Une histoire contemporaine du pain, de ses techniques, et de ses hommes. Paris: Perrin, 2002.
- La Fin des Corporations. Paris: Fayard, 2001.
- Food and Gender: Identity and Power. Co-ed. with Carole M. Counihan. New York: Harwood Academic Publisher, 1998.
- The Bakers of Paris and the Bread Question, 1700-1775. Raleigh, NC: Duke University Press, 1996.
- Le Meilleur Pain du monde. Les Boulangers de Paris au dix-huitième siécle. Paris: Fayard, 1996. Translation of Bakers of Paris.
- Farewell, Revolution: Disputed Legacies, France, 1789/1989. Ithaca, NY: Cornell University Press, 1995.
- Farewell, Revolution: The Historians' Feud, 1789/1989. Ithaca, NY: Cornell University Press, 1995.
- Adieu 89. Paris: Fayard, 1993. Translation of Farewell, Revolution, 2 vols.
- Les Ventres de Paris: pouvoir et approvisionnement dans La France d'Ancien Règime. (Paris: Fayard, 1988). Translation of Provisioning Paris.
- Work in France: Representations, Meaning, Practice, and Organization. Co-ed. with Cynthia Koepp. Ithaca, NY: Cornell University Press, 1986.
- Le Pain, le peuple et le roi. (Librairie Académique Perrin, 1986). Translation of Bread, Politics.
- Provisioning Paris: Merchants and Millers in the Grain and Flour Trade During the Eighteenth Century. Ithaca, NY: Cornell University Press, 1984.
- Understanding Popular Culture in Early Modern Europe, edited by Steven L. Kaplan. Amsterdam: Mouton Publishers, 1983.
- "The Famine Plot: Persuasion in Eighteenth Century France," in Transactions of the American Philosophical Society, Vol. 72, part 3 (1982).
- "Le Complot de famine: histoire d'une rumeur au XVIIIe siecle." (Cahiers des Annales, Armand Colin, 1982). Modified version of "The Famine Plot."
- Reappraisals and New Perspectives in European Intellectual History. Co-ed. with Dominick LaCapra). (Cornell University Press, 1982).
- The Bagarre: Galiani's "Lost" Parody. The Hague: Martinus Nijhoff, 1979.

== Awards ==
- Appointed Chevalier de l'Ordre des Arts et des Lettres [Knight of the Order of Arts and Letters] by the French Government, 25 January 1996.
- Appointed Chevalier de l'Ordre national du Mérite [Knight of the National Order of Merit] by the French Government, 22 May 2001.
- Winner [Lauréat] of the Prix Charles Aubert of the Académie des Sciences morales et politiques for life-time achievement (2009).
- Winner [Lauréat] of the Prix Thiers in History and Sociology of the Académie Française (2009) for Le Pain maudit.
- Winner [Lauréat] of the Prix Gustave Chaix d'Est Ange of the Académie des Sciences morales et politiques (2008).
- Winner [Lauréat] of the Prix Littéraire “Etats-Unis-France” for 2001 presented by the Association France-Amériques, Paris), for the best book by any American on French subject.
- Winner of the Langhe Ceretto Prize for the best book on the history of food for 1996-1997.
- Winner of the Louis Gottschalk Prize of the American Society for Eighteenth-Century Studies for “the best book in eighteenth-centuries studies” for 1996-97.
- Winner of the Koren Prize awarded by the Society for French Historical Studies for the best article of the year on a French subject (for "Réflexions sur la police du monde du travail, 1700-1815", Revue Historique 529 (Jan.-Mar. 1979).
