= Gary Okihiro =

American author and scholar (1945 – 2024)

Gary Y. Okihiro
- Born: October 14, 1945 'Aiea, Territory of Hawaii
- Died: May 20, 2024 (aged 78); New Haven, Connecticut, U.S.

Academic background
- Education: Pacific Union College, UCLA

Academic work
- Institutions: Columbia University, Cornell University, Yale University
- Doctoral students: Mary Ting Yi Lui
- Main interests: Historical methodology and theories of social and historical formations, the history of racism and racial formation in the U.S., pre-colonial and colonialist economic history, and race and world history
- Website: https://americanstudies.yale.edu/people/gary-okihiro

Gary Y. Okihiro (October 14, 1945 – May 20, 2024) was an American author and scholar. Before he moved to Yale, he was a professor of international and public affairs at Columbia University in New York City and the founding director of Columbia's Center for the Study of Ethnicity and Race. Okihiro received his Ph.D. from the University of California, Los Angeles in 1976.

== Education ==
Okihiro earned a B.A. in history from Pacific Union College in 1967. He earned his M.A. in history from UCLA in 1972. Okihiro earned his Ph.D. in African History at UCLA in 1976. His dissertation was titled "Hunters, Herders, Cultivators, and Traders: Interaction and Change in the Kgalagadi, Nineteenth Century."

Okihiro served in the Peace Corps in Botswana for three years.

== Career ==
Prior to Yale and Columbia, Okihiro was the director of Asian American Studies at Cornell University. He was recruited to Columbia partially as a result of a 1996 undergraduate student protest calling for an ethnic studies department to provide counterbalance to what was perceived to be a biased pro-Western core curriculum. He received the Lifetime Achievement Award from the Association for Asian American Studies and the American Studies Association, and was a past president of the Association for Asian American Studies. In 2010, Okihiro received an honorary doctorate from the University of the Ryukyus.

== Social Formation Theory ==
Okihiro was the originator of "social formation theory," which he defined as the forms and processes of power in society to oppress and exploit. By forms, he meant the discourses and practices of race, gender, sexuality, class, and nation, and by processes, he referred to the articulations and intersections of those social categories. Power is agency, while oppression is the restriction of agency, and exploitation, the expropriation of land and labor. Okihiro has also proposed a field of study that he called "Third World studies" from the "Third World curriculum" demanded by students of the Third World Liberation Front in 1968. Third World studies, he contended, is the correct name for the field now known as "ethnic studies." He explained that name switch and some of its consequences in his book, "Third World Studies: Theorizing Liberation" (2016).

== Death ==
Okihiro died in New Haven, Connecticut, on May 20, 2024, at the age of 79.

== Writings ==
Okihiro was the author of twelve books, six of which have won national awards, and dozens of articles on historical methodology and theories of social and historical formations, and the history of racism and racial formation in the U.S., African pre-colonial economic history, and race and world history. Among his books are:

- Cane Fires: The Anti-Japanese Movement in Hawaii, 1865-1945 (ISBN 0877229457);
- Margins and Mainstreams: Asians in American History and Culture (ISBN 0295973390);
- (with Joan Myers) Whispered Silences: Japanese Americans and World War II (ISBN 0295974982);
- (with Linda Gordon) Impounded: Dorothea Lange And the Censored Images of Japanese American Internment (ISBN 039306073X);
- Common Ground: Reimagining American History (ISBN 0691070075);
- The Columbia Guide to Asian American History (ISBN 0231115113);
- Island World: A History of Hawai`i and the United States (ISBN 9780520252998);
- Pineapple Culture: A History of the Tropical and Temperate Zones (ISBN 9780520255135).
- The Boundless Sea: Self and History (ISBN 9780520309654).
- American History Unbound: Asians and Pacific Islander (ISBN 9780520274358).
- Third World Studies: Theorizing Liberation (ISBN 9780822362098).

Okihiro also wrote on African history, including A Social History of the Bakwena and Peoples of the Kalahari of Southern Africa, 19th Century (ISBN 0773478396).
