= Sandra Elaine Greene =

American historian of West Africa

- Occupations: Historian, professor
- Employer: Cornell University
- Notable work: Sacred Sites and the Colonial Encounter: A History of Meaning and Memory in Ghana
- Title: Stephen ’59 and Madeline ’60 Anbinder Professor of African History, Chair of History Department

Sandra Elaine Greene is an American historian of West Africa and professor. She is Stephen '59 and Madeline '60 Anbinder Professor of African History and Chair of the History Department at Cornell University.

== Early life ==
Greene grew up in southwestern Ohio; her interest in education was encouraged by her mother, an elementary school teacher. Greene expected to study medicine, but found herself drawn to textual analysis as an undergraduate and ultimately majored in philosophy at Kalamazoo College. She also studied abroad at the University of Ghana, Legon via a program that had influenced her choice to enroll at Kalamazoo, then one of the only colleges in the U.S. to offer study abroad in Africa. Her study abroad experience as well as the late Civil Rights Movement and rising Black Power movement on-going while she was an undergraduate in the late 1960s and early 1970s confirmed Greene's decision to pursue African history for her graduate work.

== Bibliography ==
=== Books ===
- Gender, Ethnicity and Social Change on the Upper Slave Coast: A History of the Anlo-Ewe, Heinemann Books, Social History in Africa Series (1996). Honorable Mention, 1997 Herskovits Prize Committee American Council of Learned Societies (ACLS) selected book for e-publication as a high quality text in the humanities that is of continuing importance for teaching and research.
- Sacred Sites and the Colonial Encounter: A History of Meaning and Memory in Ghana (Indiana University Press, 2002). Finalist, 2003 Herskovits Prize for best book on Africa published in the previous year in the fields of History, Political Science, Art History, Anthropology and Literature.
- West African Narratives of Slavery: Texts from 19th and early 20th Century Ghana (Indiana University Press, 2011)
- Slave Owners of West Africa: Decision-making in the Age of Abolition (Indiana University Press, 2017)

=== Edited volumes ===
- Associate ed., New Encyclopedia of Africa, 5 volumes (Thomson-Gale, 2008). Winner, Conover-Porter Prize for the most outstanding achievement in African bibliography and reference works published during the previous two years, from the Council of Africana Librarians, African Studies Association.
- co-ed. with Alice Bellagamba and Martin A. Klein, The Bitter Legacy: African Slavery Past and Present (Markus Wiener Press, 2013)
- co-ed. with Alice Bellagamba and Martin A. Klein, African Voices on Slavery and the Slave Trade, Vol. 1 (Cambridge University Press, 2013)
- co-ed. with Alice Bellagamba and Martin A. Klein, African Voices on Slavery and the Slave Trade, Volume 2: Essays on Sources and Methods (Cambridge University Press, 2016)
- co-ed. with Alice Bellagamba and Martin A. Klein, African Slaves, African Masters: Histories, Memories, Legacies (Africa World Press, 2017)
