= Windmill Cottage =

Historic house in Rhode Island, United States

- U.S. National Register of Historic Places
- U.S. Historic district – Contributing property
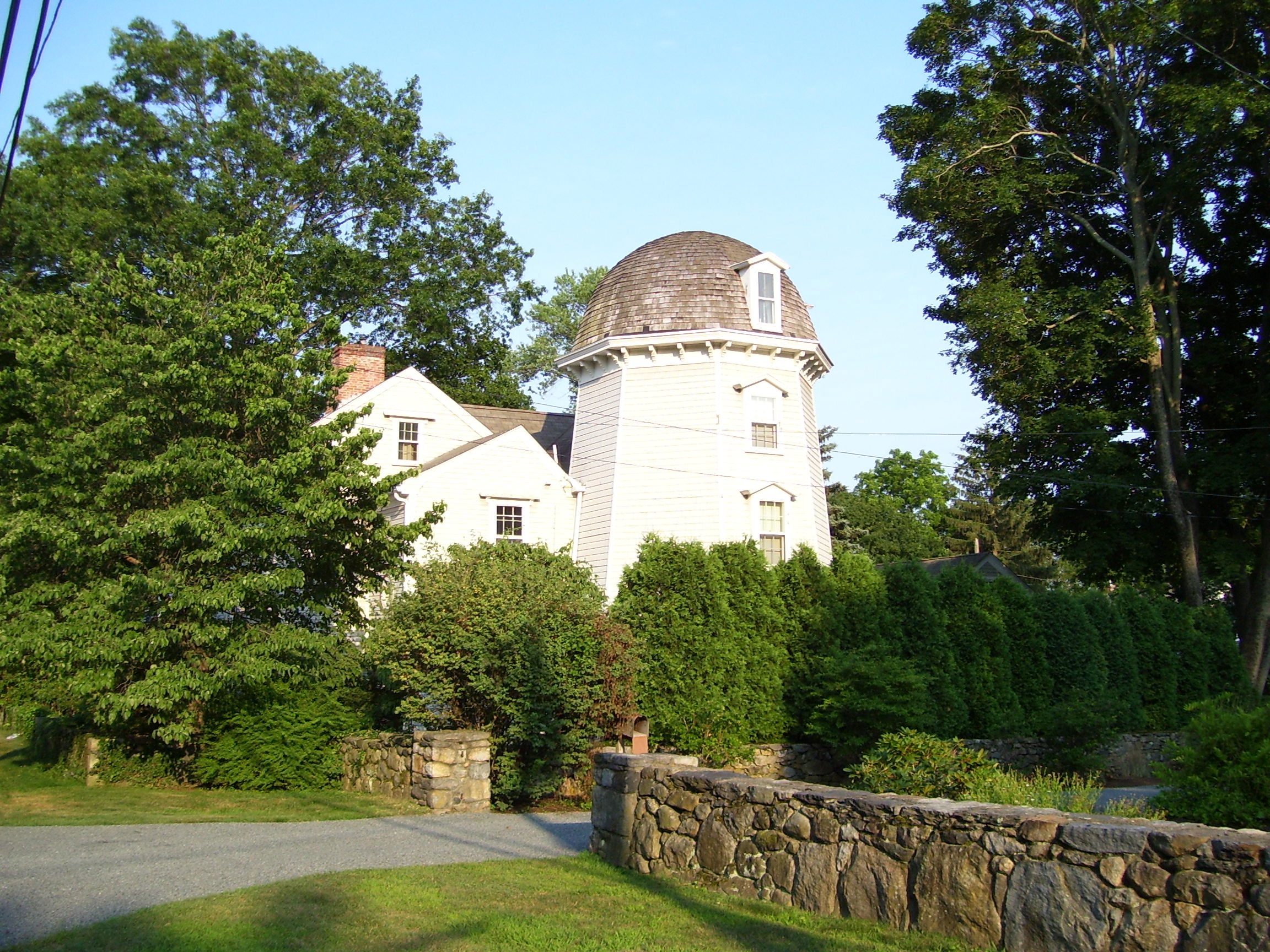
- Windmill Cottage in 2008

- Location within Rhode Island Location within the United States
- Location: East Greenwich, Rhode Island
- Coordinates: 41°39′49″N 71°27′23″W
- Built: 1790
- Part of: East Greenwich Historic District (ID74000036)
- NRHP reference No.: 73000051

Significant dates
- Added to NRHP: May 22, 1973
- Designated CP: June 13, 1974

Windmill Cottage is a historic house and former windmill at 144 Division Street in East Greenwich, Rhode Island. It was the home of George Washington Greene, a former American consul to Rome and historian. It was purchased for Greene by his friend, the poet Henry Wadsworth Longfellow.

== History ==
The house was built around 1790. Poet Henry Wadsworth Longfellow bought the cottage in 1866 for his friend, historian George Washington Greene, and had a circa–1818 windmill moved to the site in 1870 and attached to the cottage. The site was added to the National Register of Historic Places in 1973. By the 1980s, the Windmill Cottage fallen into a state of disrepair. In 1989, Ann and James Millard purchased the Windmill Cottage from the Ladd family and undertook an extensive renovation of the property. The Millard family lived in the home until selling it in 2022.

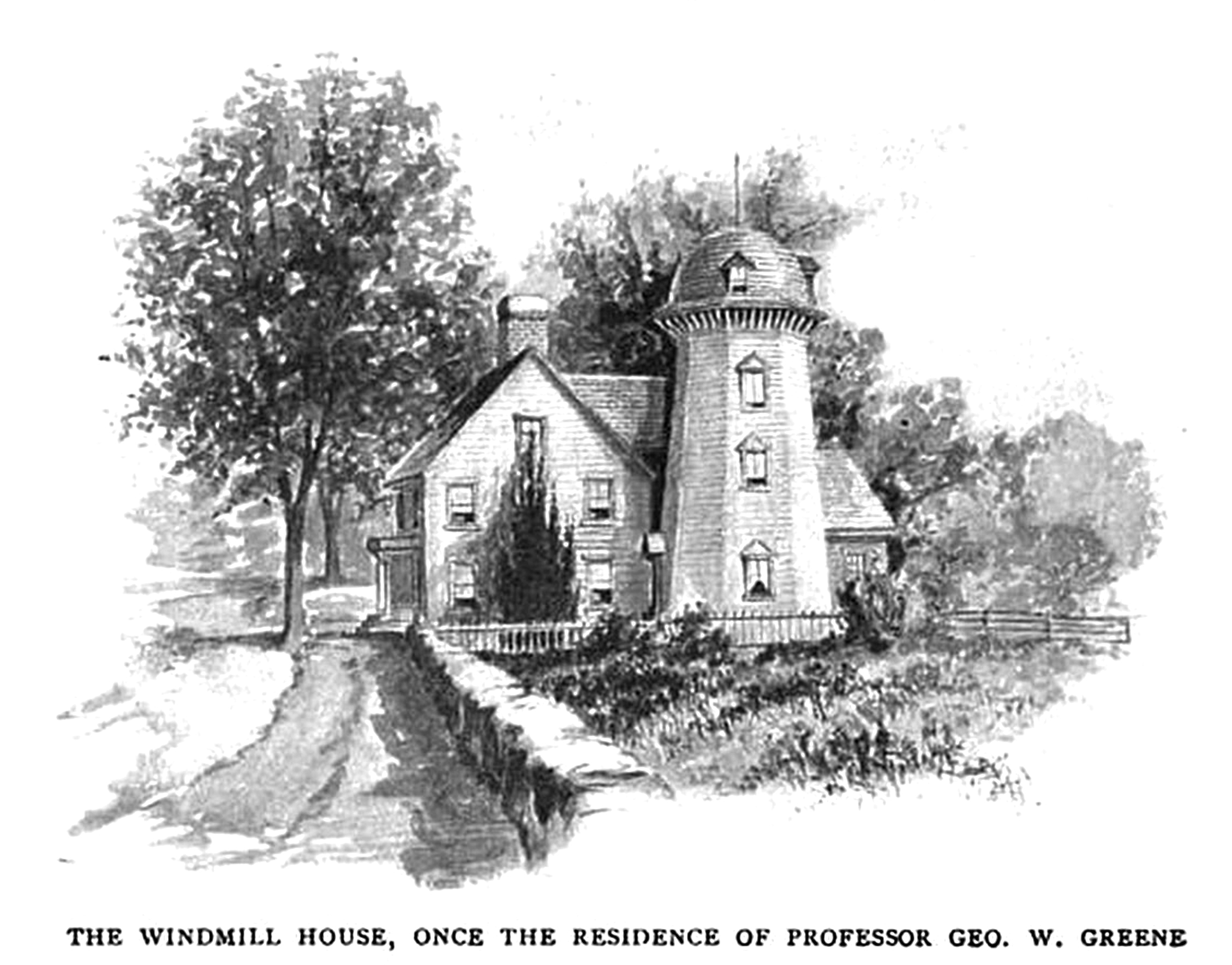
ca. 1900 image of the cottage

Longfellow first met Greene while traveling from Toulon to Pisa. Greene had moved to Italy for his health and the two bonded over a common interest in Italian language, antiquities, and contemporary art. It was Greene who first introduced Longfellow to the Italian poet Dante Alighieri. In the 1860s, Greene was one of the members of the "Dante Club", a group of scholars who assisted Longfellow in his translation of Divine Comedy.

The windmill allegedly inspired Longfellow's poem, "The Windmill." About ten years after it was attached to the home, Longfellow sent Greene a copy of the poem and, in a letter dated April 18, 1880, speculated "I think this is the first ever poem on the subject." It was published in The Youth's Companion issue for May 27, 1880, edited by Hezekiah Butterworth.

== See also ==
- National Register of Historic Places listings in Kent County, Rhode Island
