= Margo Burns =

American historian and linguist

Margo Burns is an American historian and linguist specializing in the Salem witch trials and related events in North Andover.

== Early life and education ==
Burns is the tenth-great-grandchild of Rebecca Nurse the grandchild of writer Armstrong Sperry. They received an A.B. from Mount Holyoke College in 1980 and an M.A. from University of New Hampshire in 1991. Burns studied animation for two years in the Rhode Island School of Design's continuing education program. Burns lives in New Hampshire.

== Career ==
Burns's initial interest in the Salem Witch Trials led them to explore its North Andover analog. Bernard Rosenthal invited them to be the project manager and associate editor of the book Records of the Salem Witch-Hunt. The book expanded on previous scholarship, including new court documents and corrected earlier scholarship errors. Burns' attention to paleography helped sort out the errors and idiosyncrasies from the original recorders of the handwritten manuscripts which had last been transcribed in 1938.

Burns appears in several history documentaries about the Salem witchcraft trials: "Salem Witch Hunt: Examine the Evidence" (2011) for the Essex National Heritage Commission and the National Park Service, and "Salem: Unmasking the Devil" (2011) with author Katherine Howe, discussing the case of Rebecca Nurse, for the National Geographic Channel. It aired on the BBC under the alternate title "Salem Witch Trials Conspiracy".

In 2016, they appeared with historian Mary Beth Norton, in Season 7, Episode 2, of the TLC cable television series, "Who Do You Think You Are?" discussing actor Scott Foley's ancestor, Samuel Wardwell of Andover, MA, who was one of the 19 people hanged during the Salem witchcraft trials. They later appeared on this show with Emerson Baker, in 2018 in Season 9, Episode 7, speaking with actress Jean Smart about their ancestor, Dorcas Hoar.

In addition to their work with the Salem and Andover events, Burns is a researcher into historical animated cartoons and gives lectures for the New Hampshire Humanities Council about cartoon history in the US. They also created a font, Dana Library Hand, which was "inspired by a recommended penmanship style for librarians to use when writing out card catalogue cards."
