= Rachel Judith Weil =

American historian

Rachel Judith Weil (born 1959) is a teacher and scholar, specializing in gender and culture in 17th and 18th century England. She is currently a professor of early modern English political and cultural history in the Department of History at Cornell University in Ithaca, NY.

== Life ==
Weil received her B.A. degree from Brown University in 1981 and her Ph.D. from Princeton University in 1991 with a dissertation titled "Sexual Ideology and Political Propaganda in England 1680-1714". She has continued scholarly studies of the historical relationship of sexuality and politics in such essays as "Sometimes a Scepter is Only a Scepter: Pornography and Politics in Restoration England" (1993). Weil later published Political Passions: Gender, the Family & Political Argument in England 1680-1714 (1999), an examination of the political implications of family and gender relationships in early modern English history. Her most recent work concerns early modern English political intrigue and conspiracy.

== Books ==
- A Plague of Informers: Conspiracy and Political Trust in William III's England (Yale University Press, 2014)
- Political Passions: Gender, the Family and Political Argument in England, 1680-1714 (Manchester University Press 1999), ISBN 0-7190-5622-5
