= School of Criticism and Theory =

Academic program at Cornell University

Coordinates: 42.4482°N 76.4819°W

The School of Criticism and Theory, now at Cornell University, is a summer program (offered in six-week seminars) in social science and literature. It is one of the most influential such programs in the United States to propagate the new dominant stream of "literary-critical-cultural 'theory'." The school was co-founded in 1976 by Murray Krieger, a prominent New Critic, and Hazard Adams, a literary critic, at the University of California, Irvine, and has previously been housed at Northwestern University and Dartmouth College. In 2011, Cornell hosted it for the thirteenth time. In 2002, it was directed by Dominick LaCapra.

== Notable seminar leaders ==
- Amanda Anderson
- Rey Chow
- Stanley Fish
- Michael Riffaterre
- Edward Said
- Barbara Herrnstein Smith
- Hayden White
