= Herbert Tuttle =

American historian

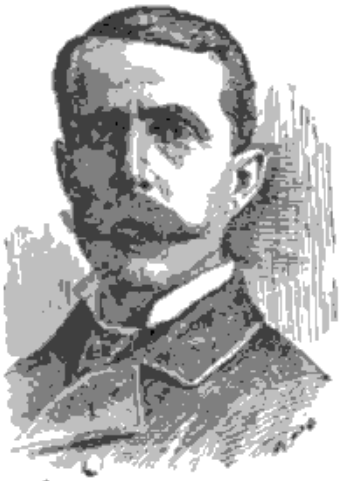

Personal details
- Born: November 29, 1846 Bennington, Vermont
- Died: June 21, 1894 (aged 47) Ithaca, New York
- Spouse: Mary McArthur (m. 1875)
- Education: University of Vermont
- Occupation: Historian

Herbert Tuttle (1846–1894) was an American historian.

== Biography ==
Herbert Tuttle was born in Bennington, Vermont on November 29, 1846.

He graduated in 1869 from the University of Vermont. From 1880 to 1881 he was a lecturer on international law at the University of Michigan, and in the latter year was appointed to the chair of politics and international law at Cornell University. He was subsequently transferred to the chair of European history in the Department of History.

He married Mary McArthur on July 6, 1875.

He died in Ithaca, New York on June 21, 1894.

== Books ==
- German Political Leaders (1876)
- History of Prussia to the Accession of Frederick the Great (1884)
- History of Prussia under Frederick the Great (1888)
