= The Way We Argue Now =

2006 book by Amanda Anderson

The Way We Argue Now: A Study in the Cultures of Theory
- Cover
- Author: Amanda Anderson
- Language: English
- Subject: Literary theory, cultural studies, political theory
- Publisher: Princeton University Press
- Publication date: 2006
- Publication place: United States
- Media type: Print
- Pages: 224
- ISBN: 978-0-691-11404-0
- OCLC: 62741580

The Way We Argue Now: A Study in the Cultures of Theory is a 2006 book by American literary scholar Amanda Anderson that studies how academics and intellectuals debate ideas in literary, cultural, and political theory. The work investigates why theoretical antagonisms often feel unproductive or stuck, examining how personal values, entrenched oppositions, and varying claims to critical distance shape scholarly discourse. Anderson challenges the notion that "theory is dead," stressing the living dimensions of practical philosophies, and critiques poststructuralist and identity-based approaches for their scepticism toward rational debate. Building on the work of liberal theorists like Jürgen Habermas, she argues that reasoned argument and reflective thinking should be understood not as cold intellectual exercises but as ethical practices essential to democratic life. Through detailed readings of debates between figures like Judith Butler and Seyla Benhabib, as well as engagements with Satya Mohanty, Richard Rorty, and Michel Foucault, Anderson reconstructs key theoretical tensions while proposing an engaged-proceduralist alternative. The book covers debates within feminism, queer theory, cosmopolitanism, and pragmatism, calling for a "culture of argument" that values genuine dialogue and critical reflection.

== Background ==
In a 2008 interview, Anderson discussed the motivations behind The Way We Argue Now, explaining that the book evolved from her longstanding interest in "the normative dimensions of contemporary theory" and her concern that the normative bases of much academic theory were "under-elaborated or incoherent." Drawing from her background in Victorian studies and theoretical critique, she emphasized that the book was not a wholesale rejection of academic argument but rather a call to revitalize "a robust culture of argument" rooted in Enlightenment and liberal democratic ideals. The title alludes to Anthony Trollope's The Way We Live Now (1875), though Anderson clarified she aimed to diagnose specific problems rather than offer "a blanket dismissal of 'argument society.'" She noted the book could have been titled "The Way We Fail to Argue Now," as it addresses how dogmatism and identity politics that allows "claims to identity to trump other claims" have undermined reciprocal reason-giving in academic debate. The project grew from her work on The Powers of Distance (2001), when she became captivated by what she called "the character of theory."

== Summary ==
Anderson presents a sustained reflection on the nature and culture of academic argument within the realms of literary and cultural theory. Concerned with the often unproductive patterns of contemporary theoretical debate, Anderson investigates how deeply held values, ideological investments, and divergent conceptions of objectivity influence the way arguments are made—and how they can limit rather than advance understanding.

Rejecting the notion that theory has reached a dead end, she argues instead for its continued relevance, provided it is grounded in practices of critical reasoning and mutual recognition. Building on the work of the liberal and rationalist traditions, especially the work of Jürgen Habermas, Anderson critiques tendencies within post-structuralism and identity-based theory that cast rational debate as inherently complicit with dominance or exclusion.

The book is organized into three major parts. The first, "Critical Practices," focuses on the internal conflicts within feminist and queer theory, using the exchange between Judith Butler and Seyla Benhabib as a case study to explore how arguments about agency, normativity, and identity often reflect competing visions of political engagement.

The second part, "Living Universalism," takes up the question of how universal principles can be articulated and defended in a pluralistic world. Anderson argues that a renewed form of universalism—responsive to context yet committed to shared ideals—is both possible and necessary.

The final part, "Ethos and Argument," turns to the ethical dimensions of argument itself. Engaging with pragmatism, Foucault's later writings, and proceduralist political thought, Anderson contends that rational discourse should be understood not simply as a logical operation but as a cultivated ethos—an ongoing commitment to openness, reflexivity, and principled disagreement.

== Reviews ==
In her review of the book, Lauren M. E. Goodlad stressed Anderson's incisive and often "dazzling, razor-sharp analyses" of feminism, cosmopolitanism, and postmodern critique, and supported the book's central argument that theory remains "alive if unwell" amid a cultural shift away from rational argumentation. Goodlad commended Anderson's advocacy of a proceduralist ethos rooted in Habermasian communicative ethics, which repositions argument itself as a form of ethical practice. At the same time, she raised concerns about Anderson's tendency to frame critiques of Habermas—especially those from poststructuralist scholars such as Saba Mahmood and Wendy Brown—as mere characterological prejudice, thereby risking the dismissal of serious philosophical challenges. Goodlad also noted that the book's recurring focus on the Foucault/Habermas binary may limit its scope by foreclosing alternative lines of critique.

Scott F. Crider praised Anderson's theoretical sophistication in refining and restoring liberal principles of freedom, universalism, and reason through her advocacy of Habermasian "communicative ethics," calling her work "refreshing" and finding himself "inspired by Anderson's arguments and her example" on philosophical grounds. Crider particularly commended Part III, where Anderson studies ethos as a corrective to both procedural rationalism and identity politics, reframing argument itself as an ethical practice. While commending Anderson as "a model of ethical intellectual engagement" whose paraphrases were "always clear and usually measured," Crider worried that the book exemplified how literary critics had forfeited their responsibility to defend poetry. He said that although the book succeeded as rhetorical analysis and theoretical defense, it gave him "pause" as an instance of literary study at a time when people read less imaginative literature.

David Wayne Thomas said the work offers "a less predictable and more constructive undertaking" than typical critiques of theory, and emphasized Anderson's effort to reframe academic discourse through renewed commitment to rational argument, intersubjective engagement, and liberal universalism. Thomas appreciated her challenge to the theoretical community's reflexive rejection of Enlightenment concepts, and observed that she articulated "an affirmative vision of rational inquiry and debate" drawn from the Kantian-Habermasian tradition. Thomas found particularly compelling Anderson's treatment of the supposed opposition between ethos and rational argument, especially her demonstration that Habermasian theory offered its own vision of ethos. He stressed Anderson's central claim that "rational argument is an ethos"—an identity-forming practice rather than a denial of identity—viewing this as a coherent response to various theoretical accounts arrayed against the liberal tradition. While acknowledging that some readers might struggle with the implications of seeing "seeking as a way of being and disembedding as a form of embeddedness," Thomas thought that Anderson had powerfully outlined how theorists might move beyond entrenched binaries and "staling oppositions" that had reinforced a static discourse of theory. He characterized her as "a brilliant reader and arguer" whose respectful yet critical approach embodied the very ethos of argument she advocated, offering a means of self-clarification and democratic engagement.
