= Jeremy Varon =

American historian

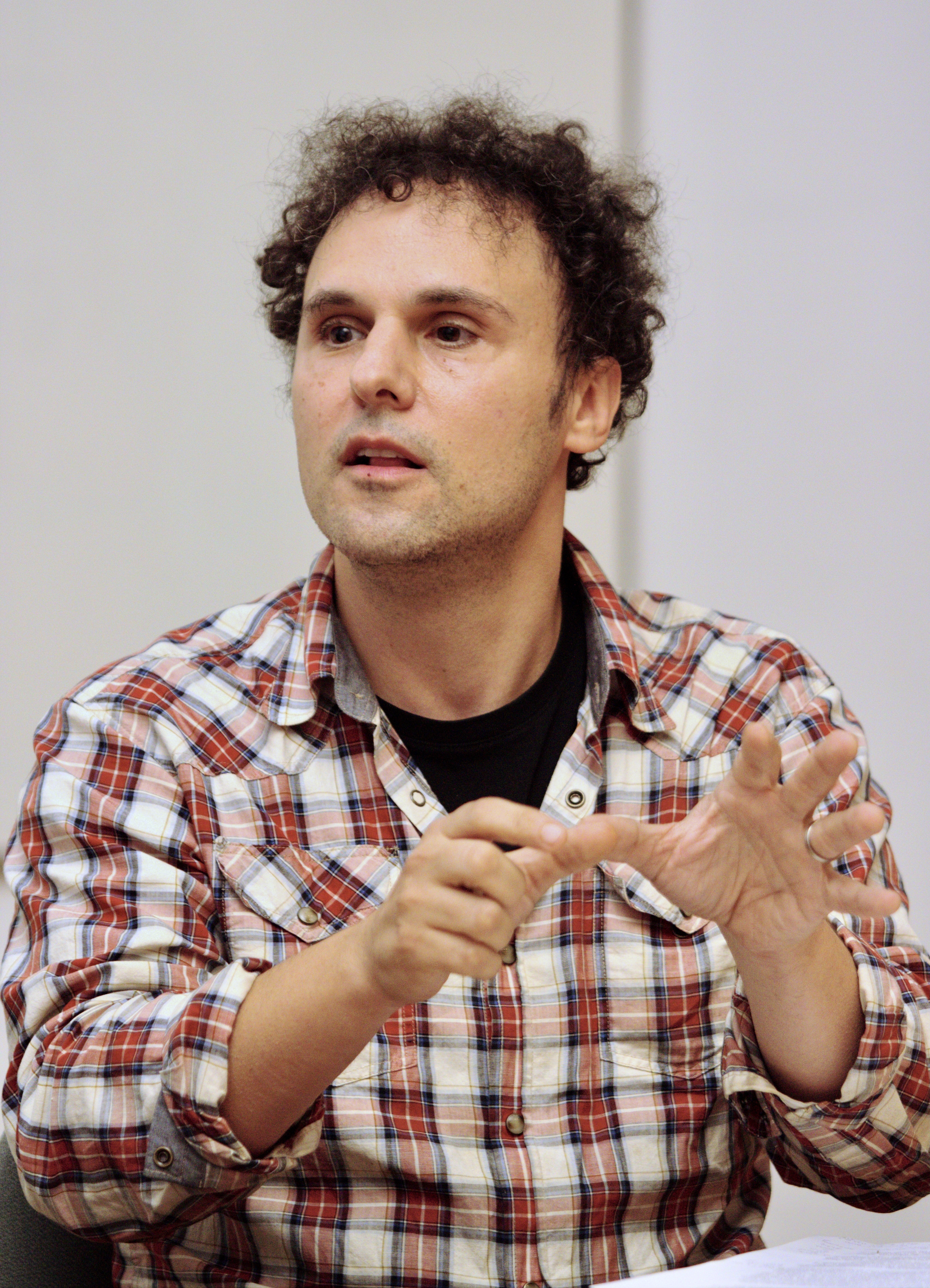
Varon in 2012

Jeremy Peter Varon (born 1967) is an American historian. He is a professor of history at the New School for Social Research and Eugene Lang College. He is the author of the books, Bringing the War Home: The Weather Underground, the Red Army Faction, and Revolutionary Violence in the Sixties and Seventies (2004) and The New Life: The Jewish Students of Postwar Germany (2014). He cofounded and coedits The Sixties: A Journal of History, Politics, and Culture, an academic journal published by Taylor & Francis.

Varon completed a B.A. in history at Brown University in 1989. He earned a M.A. (1995) and Ph.D. (1998) in History at Cornell University, under doctoral advisor Dominick LaCapra.

Varon was a historian at Drew University.
