= J. Victor Koschmann =

American professor of Japanese history

Julian Victor Koschmann is Professor Emeritus of Japanese History at the Department of History at Cornell University. His primary field of expertise is the history of Japan. He earned his B.A. at International Christian University in 1965, his M.A. at Sophia University in 1971, and his Ph.D at the University of Chicago in 1980.

Koschmann is interested in the nexus between political thought and action, primarily but not exclusively in twentieth-century Japan. In his most recent work he explored new perspectives on thought and action during Japan’s war years (1931–45), in the context of themes such as pan-Asianism, the discourse on economic ethics, colonialism, and left-wing movements. Koschmann is also interested in the rise and decline of citizens’ and other new social movements in postwar Japan and elsewhere, especially in relation to the rise of neoliberalism; the history of Marxism; and the dynamics of empire.

== Selected publications ==
- Revolution and Subjectivity in Postwar Japan (Chicago: University of Chicago Press, 1996).
- The Mito Ideology: Discourse, Reform and Insurrection in Late Tokugawa Japan, 1790-1864 (Berkeley and Los Angeles: The University of California Press, 1987).
- Pan-Asianism in Modern Japanese History: Colonialism, Regionalism and Borders (London: Routledge, 2007. Co-edited with Sven Saaler.
- Total War and ‘Modernization’, Cornell East Asia Series 100 (Ithaca, Cornell University East Asia Program, 1998). Co-edited with Yasushi Yamanouchi and Ryûichi Narita.
- Conflict in Modern Japanese History: The Neglected Tradition (Princeton, NJ: Princeton University Press, 1982). Co-edited with Tetsuo Najita.
- “Shutaisei to dôin” [Subjectivity and mobilization], trans. Kasai Hirotaka, in Sengo to iu chiseigaku [Geopolitics of postwar], edited by Nishikawa Yûko (Tokyo: University of Tokyo Press, 2006), pp. 43–68.
- “Modernization and Democratic Values: The ‘Japanese Model’ in the 1960s,” in Staging Growth: Modernization, Development, and the Global Cold War, edited by David C. Engerman, Nils Gilman, Mark Haefele, and Michael E. Latham (Amherst, MA: University of Massachusetts Press, 2003), 225-249.
- “Tekunorojii no shihai, shihai no tekunorojii” [Rule by technology, technologies of rule], translated by Kasai Hirotaka, in Sôryokusen no chi to seido, 1935-55 [Knowledge and Institutions of Total War, 1935–55), edited by Sakai Naoki [Kindai Nihon bunkashi 7] (Tokyo: Iwanami Shoten, 2002), 139-71.
