= Stanley Chodorow =

American historian

Stanley Chodorow is a historian and former academic administrator who was Vice President of Academic Affairs at Questia Media (now defunct). Prior to that, he was at the University of California, San Diego from 1968 to 1994, first as a professor of history and later a dean. In 1994, he left UCSD to become Provost at the University of Pennsylvania, where he remained until 1997. He received his BA from Cornell University, and his PhD from Cornell's Department of History in 1968. He has since returned to UCSD where he has lectured in the humanities, the "Making of the Modern World", and in culture, art, and technology sequences.

== Professional interests ==
Chodorow has widely published on scholarly communication and political history, especially in the Middle Ages. These interests merged in his later work as a university administrator, where he critically examined the issues around the role of libraries and academic information.
