= Amanda Anderson =

American academic

Amanda Anderson is the Andrew W. Mellon Professor of Humanities and English and Director of the Cogut Institute for the Humanities at Brown University. She is a literary scholar and theorist who has written on nineteenth- and twentieth-century literature and culture as well as on contemporary debates in literary and cultural theory.

== Career ==
Anderson received her Ph.D. in English from Cornell University.

She taught at the University of Illinois–Urbana-Champaign from 1989 until 1999 when she joined the faculty of Johns Hopkins University. She was Caroline Donovan Professor of English Literature from 2002 to 2012 and the head of the English department from 2003 to 2009.

She was appointed Senior Fellow at the School of Criticism and Theory at Cornell University and served as Director of the School from 2008 until 2014, when she was appointed Honorary Senior Fellow.

In 2012, she joined the faculty at Brown University as Andrew W. Mellon Professor of Humanities and English. In 2015, she was appointed as Director of the Cogut Center for the Humanities. The center was elevated to an institute in 2017.

At the institute, she developed the Collaborative Humanities Initiative, which sponsors a doctoral certificate in Collaborative Humanities. She has anchored the co-taught capstone course of the certificate, a Project Development Workshop, since 2019. The certificate and capstone course draw doctoral students from across the humanities and the humanistic social sciences. In her role as director she has also served on the advisory board of the international Consortium of Humanities Centers and Institutes since 2017.

She delivered the Clarendon Lectures at the University of Oxford in November 2015 under the title “Psyche and Ethos”. They were published in book form by Oxford University Press in 2018.

From 2020–2023, she hosted the Cogut Institute’s podcast series “Meeting Street: Conversations in the Humanities.” The show features scholars speaking about a broad array of topics in the humanities, including environmental humanities, AI and big data, disability studies, critical university studies, and collaborative projects in mental health, virtual reality, happiness studies, and Black studies.

== Awards ==
- 2022 Presidential Award Lecture, Brown University
- 2020 John B. Birkelund Fellow in the Humanities, American Academy in Berlin
- 2019–2020 Berlin Prize, American Academy in Berlin
- 2014–present Honorary Senior Fellow, School of Criticism and Theory
- 2009 Guggenheim Fellowship
- 2008 Ward Phillips Lectures, University of Notre Dame, March 2008
- 2006–2007 Magnet Scholar, Human Rights Institute, University of Connecticut
- 2006–2014 Senior Fellow, School of Criticism and Theory

== Work ==
Much of Anderson’s scholarship and teaching have centered on nineteenth-century literature and the relation between forms of modern thought and knowledge and understandings of selfhood, social life, and ethics, but increasingly she also focuses broadly on the nature of argumentation and discourse. In The Way We Argue Now, she analyzes a number of influential contemporary theoretical debates, with special attention to the forms of argument that shape work in pragmatism, feminism, cosmopolitanism, and proceduralism.

In her 2012 TedxBrownUniversity talk, she reflects on the “distinctive value of the humanities” and argues that the humanities “open one up to an appreciation and an understanding of the centrality of the questions of value to the human experience.” After Max Weber, she describes the humanities as engaged in a labor of “clarification”: “in assessing works in the humanities, one comes to a better understanding of what one values and how given what one values one can make any number of practical and ethical decisions.”

== Bibliography ==
- Tainted Souls and Painted Faces: The Rhetoric of Fallenness in Victorian Culture Cornell University Press, 1993, ISBN 978-0-8014-2781-7
- The Powers of Distance: Cosmopolitanism and the Cultivation of Detachment. Princeton University Press. 2001. ISBN 978-0-691-07497-9.
- Amanda Anderson; Joseph Valente, eds. (2002). Disciplinarity at the Fin de Siècle. Princeton University Press. ISBN 978-0-691-08962-1.
- The Way We Argue Now. Princeton University Press. 2006. ISBN 978-0-691-11404-0.
- Amanda Anderson and Harry E. Shaw, eds. A Companion to George Eliot. Wiley-Blackwell, 2013. ISBN 978-0-470-65599-3.
- Bleak Liberalism. Chicago: University of Chicago Press, 2016. ISBN 978-0-226-92352-9.
- Psyche and Ethos: Moral Life After Psychology. Oxford University Press, 2018. ISBN 9780198755821
- Amanda Anderson, Rita Felski, and Toril Moi. Character: Three Inquiries in Literary Studies. Chicago: University of Chicago Press, 2019. ISBN 978-0-226-65866-7.
- Amanda Anderson and Simon During. Humanities Theory. Oxford University Press, 2026, ISBN 9780198918783.
