= Joan Myers =

American photographer

Joan Myers (born in Des Moines, Iowa, 1944) is a fine art photographer best known for her images of Antarctica and the American West. She has also photographed the Japanese Relocation Camp from the 1940s, the Spanish pilgrimage to Santiago de Compostela, India wildlife, women as they age, and the extremes of ice and fire such as glaciers and volcanoes. She currently lives in northern New Mexico.

== Biography ==
Myers earned a master's degree in musicology from Stanford University in 1967 with a concentration on Renaissance and baroque music performance. In the early 1970s she turned to photography. She began as a large-format platinum-palladium printer and now shoots and prints digitally.

Her work has been exhibited in over 50 one-person shows and is in more than 30 public collections including: The Museum of Modern Art, George Eastman House, the National Gallery of Art (Smithsonian Institution), Amon Carter Museum, the University of New Mexico, the Museum of Fine Arts (Houston), the Museum of Photographic Art (San Diego), and the Center for Creative Photography (Tucson).

In 2002, the National Science Foundation awarded Joan Myers an Antarctic Artists and Writer's Grant to photograph at McMurdo Station, surrounding field stations, historic huts, and the South Pole during the 2002-2003 austral summer.

Her photography archive is housed at the Dolph Briscoe Center for American History at the University of Texas.

== Books ==
- Where the Buffalo Roamed ISBN 978-88-6208-656-1
- The Persephones ISBN 978-886208-498-7
- Fire and Ice ISBN 978-886208-392-8
- The Jungle at the Door ISBN 9781938086069
- Wondrous Cold ISBN 1-58834-238-7
- Salt Dreams ISBN 0-8263-2126-7
- Santiago: Saint of Two Worlds ISBN 0-8263-1274-8
- Whispered Silences ISBN 0-295-97498-2
- Pie Town Woman ISBN 0-8263-2283-2
- Along the Santa Fe Trail ISBN 0-8263-0882-1
- The Essential Landscape ISBN 0-8263-0784-1

== Awards ==
- 1996 Golden Globe Award for Whispered Silences from the Maine Photographic Workshops
- 1997 Myers Center Award for the Study of Human Rights in North America for Whispered Silences
- 1999 Western States Arts Foundation Award for best creative non-fiction book to Salt Dreams
- 2000 William P. Clements Prize for the Best nonfiction Book on Southwestern America for Salt Dreams
- 2001 Best Illustrated Trade Book Award from the Publishers Association of the West for Pie Town Woman
- 2005 Wondrous Cold: An Antarctic Journey received an Honorable Mention from the American Association of Museums' 2006 Publications Competition

== Selected solo exhibitions ==
- 1976 Robert Schoelkopf Gallery, New York
- 1986-1989 Smithsonian Institution Traveling Exhibition Service (SITES) tour of "Santa Fe Trail Series" (including Nelson Atkins Museum of Art and the Akron Art Museum)
- 1992 Albuquerque Museum, Albuquerque (Traveling Show of "Santiago: Saint of Two Worlds")
- 1996–1999 Smithsonian Institution Traveling Exhibition Service (SITES) tour of "Whispered Silences" (including Japanese American National Museum, San Diego Museum of Photographic Art, and California State University (Sacramento)
- 2001–2002 California Council for the Humanities tour of Salt Dreams
- 2002–2003 Albuquerque Museum show and tour of Pie Town Woman
- 2006–2010 Smithsonian Institution Traveling Exhibition Service (SITES) show of Wondrous Cold: An Antarctic Journey (including Smithsonian Museum of Natural History)
- 2009–2010 Nevada Museum of Art, Reno (Wondrous Cold)
- 2014 New Mexico Museum of Art
