= Mary Beth Norton =

American historian

Mary Beth Norton (born 1943) is an American historian, specializing in American colonial history and well known for her work on women's history and the Salem witch trials. She is the Mary Donlon Alger Professor Emeritus of American History at the Department of History at Cornell University. The first woman to join the department of history at Cornell University, Norton is a pioneer of women historians not only in the United States but also in the world.

Norton received her Bachelor of Arts (B. A.) at the University of Michigan (1964). The next year she completed a Master of Arts (M. A.), going on to receive her Ph.D. in 1969 at Harvard University. Norton served as president of the American Historical Association in 2018. She is a recipient of the Ambassador Book Award in American Studies for In the Devil's Snare: The Salem Witchcraft Crisis of 1692. She identifies as a Democrat and she considers herself a Methodist.

== Biography ==
Mary Beth Norton was born on March 25, 1943, in Ann Arbor, Michigan. Her father, Clark Frederic Norton, was a political science professor, a legislative assistant to a U.S. Senator, and an employee of the Congressional Research Service. Her mother, Mary Norton (her maiden name was Lunny), was also a professor. Her parents played a special role when encouraging her to study. In 1948, they left Ann Arbor and moved to Greencastle, a city in Indiana where both parents taught at DePauw University. Her father was a political science professor, and her mother taught Latin. She and her family were very tied to the academic year and to DePauw.

As a child, Norton was very interested in reading. At a very young age, she began reading the adult section books at the Greencastle public library, having read all the ones in the children's section. This is one reason she took her first after-school job at the DePauw University library, making sure all the books were correctly organized. During her high school years, Norton felt she did not fit with the rest of her classmates, as she was the only student interested in books and history. When she reached college, at the University of Michigan, she met many other people with the same interests and got involved in national and campus politics.

In 1960, she campaigned for John F. Kennedy with the youth wing of the Democratic Party. She was part of the student group that welcomed Kennedy on a visit to Michigan, where he first came up with the idea of the Peace Corps. Thanks to the students' support in Ann Arbor, Kennedy decided to make the Peace Corps one of his priorities during his campaign for the U.S. presidency.

During her years at the University of Michigan, she held a seat on the Michigan Student Government Council, went to many congresses of the National Student Association (NSA) as a delegate, where she took part actively in the politics around the civil rights movement. The first time she experienced sex discrimination for being a woman was during her participation in the NSA, where male members would not allow her or other women to take leadership roles.

When applying for the Woodrow Wilson fellowship for graduate school, she was told by the professor at Michigan responsible for the applications that girls did not have many chances to obtain that fellowship. However, she decided to apply both to the Wilson and the Fulbright fellowships (the only two offered to women at that time) in the face of sex discrimination. She obtained the Wilson fellowship, which brought a year of study in addition to the four years offered her by Harvard. She did much of her Ph.D. research in England, and in 1970 her work won the Allan Nevins prize from the Society of American Historians for the best-written dissertation. Two years later, it was published as The British-Americans: The Loyalist Exiles in England, 1774-1789 by Little, Brown and Company.

Subsequently, she was offered a job at the University of Connecticut as an assistant professor of history, a turning point in her career. She spent two years there and got to know Tom Paterson, with whom she would later coauthor a new U.S. history textbook, the two-volume A People & A Nation, currently in its 11th edition. After learning of the Nevins prize, and reading Norton ́s Ph.D. dissertation, Cornell University (New York) offered her a job as an assistant professor of history, becoming the first woman in Cornell ́s history department.

In 1973 she took part in the first Berkshire Conference on the History of Women. Now called the Conference on Women, Gender, and Sexuality, it meets every three years and reaches more than 1000 participants from all over the world, including Mary Beth Norton in every single meeting. At the 6th conference in 1984, Norton co-chaired the event committee and published alongside her cochair the book “To Toil the Livelong Day:” American Women at Work, 1780-1980, containing 17 of the best papers from the conference.

In 1974 she was promoted to associate professor of American history. In 1987 she became the Mary Donlon Alger Professor of American History. She continued teaching, managing her academic writings, and serving on the faculty senate, having been chosen by election twice to the Board of Trustees, until her retirement at the end of 2018.

Cornell was the place where Norton started to develop her interest in women's history. During her first year there, she took part in converting the small female studies program, of which graduate students had been in charge, into one of the most successful in the United States. She also started to research about women in United States history, and returned to England to research the gender question in Loyalist claims, which she wrote about in her first article on women's history. It was published in 1976 in the William and Mary Quarterly, a leading journal of American history and culture, and was the inspiration for Liberty's Daughters: The Revolutionary Experience of American Women, 1750-1800, her second book. The book won extremely positive reviews, including the ones written by Lawrence Stone, from the New York Times Book Review, and by Gerda Lerner, from the Washington Post Book World, who said "Norton's thoroughly researched evidence ... makes a valuable addition to our knowledge of the lives, thoughts and activities of women in the revolutionary era."

In 1985 the International Federation for Research in Women's History, whose current members come from more than 20 countries, was founded by Norton, along with Karen Offen and Ida Blom. She also served as the general editor of the AHA Guide to Historical Literature in 1995.

Her book Founding Mothers & Fathers: Gendered Power and the Forming of American Society explains the gender and power differences in the 17th century in New England and the Chesapeake and the deep analysis displayed in this book won her in 1997 a finalist place for the Pulitzer Prize in History.

Norton appears in a variety of history programs and documentaries about colonial times, including Salem Witch Trials in the Discovery Channel's Unsolved History series in 2003 and in Witch Hunt on the History Channel in 2004. She was interviewed in 2008 for the PBS Series History Detectives, on Season 6, Episode 7, "Front Street Blockhouse.". She appeared in Salem Witch Hunt: Examine the Evidence in 2011 for the Essex National Heritage Commission and the National Park Service She made an appearance in the very first episode of the American version of Who Do You Think You Are?, helping Sarah Jessica Parker trace her Massachusetts ancestry, which involved the Salem witch trials. She also appeared, with historian Margo Burns, in Season 8 (2016) of the TLC genealogy show, speaking with actor Scott Foley about his ancestor, Samuel Wardwell, who was executed for witchcraft during the trials in 1692.

== Memberships and positions in organizations ==
Norton has served on the National Council on the Humanities, as president of the Berkshire Conference of Women Historians, and as vice president for research of the American Historical Association. She also served as the general editor of the AHA Guide to Historical Literature in 1995. Norton was elected a Fellow of the American Academy of Arts and Sciences in 1999. She was also elected Speaker of the third Cornell University Senate. Norton has won grants and fellowships from the National Endowment for the Humanities, the Guggenheim Foundation, and the Rockefeller Foundation.

Norton was elected as president-elect of the American Historical Association in summer 2016. She served as president-elect during calendar 2017 and as president in 2018.

She has also been a member of the Organization of American Historians, the Society of American Historians, the American Antiquarian Society, the Berkshire Conference of Women Historians, the Conference Group on Women's History, the Coordinating Committee of Women in the Historical Profession, the Phi Beta Kappa, the Mortar Board and the Phi Kappa Phi.

Norton was elected to membership in the American Philosophical Society in 2010.

== Works ==
- In the Devil's Snare: The Salem Witchcraft Crisis of 1692. Random House Digital, Inc. 2003. ISBN 978-0-375-70690-5.
- The British-Americans: The Loyalist Exiles in England, 1774-1789, Little, Brown (Boston, MA), 1972.
- (Editor, with Carol Berkin) Women of America: A History, Houghton Mifflin (Boston, MA), 1979.
- (Coauthor) A People and a Nation: A History of the United States, Houghton Mifflin (Boston, MA), 1982, 6th revised edition, 2001, 6th brief edition, 2003.
- (Editor, with Carol Groneman) "To Toil the Livelong Day": America's Women at Work, 1780-1980, Cornell University Press (Ithaca, NY), 1987.
- (Editor, with Ruth M. Alexander) Major Problems in American Women's History: Documents and Essays, D. C. Heath (Lexington, MA), 1989, 3rd revised edition, Houghton Mifflin (Boston, MA), 2003.
- (Editor, with Pamela Gerardi) The American Historical Association's Guide to Historical Literature, 3rd revised edition, Oxford University Press (New York, NY), 1995.
- Liberty's Daughters: The Revolutionary Experience of American Women, 1750–1800. Cornell University Press. 1996. ISBN 978-0-8014-8347-9.
- Founding Mothers & Fathers: Gendered Power and the Forming of American Society. Random House Digital, Inc. 1997. ISBN 978-0-679-74977-6.
- Separated By Their Sex: Women in Public and Private in the Colonial Atlantic World. Cornell University Press. 2011. ISBN 978-0-8014-4949-9.
- 1774: The Long Year of Revolution (2020) online review by Gordon S. Wood

Contributor to Women in the Age of the American Revolution, edited by Ronald Hoffman and Peter Albert, 1989; The Transformation of Early American History, edited by James Henretta, and others, 1991; and Learning History in America, edited by Lloyd Kramer, and others, 1994. Also contributor to History Today, William and Mary Quarterly, Signs, and many other journals.

== Awards and honors ==
- Woodrow Wilson fellowship, 1964–65
- Allan Nevins Prize of Society of American Historians for best doctoral dissertation in American history, 1969
- National Endowment for the Humanities Younger Humanists fellowship, 1974–75
- Charles Warren Center fellowship, Harvard University, 1974–75
- Shelby Cullom Davis Center fellowship, Princeton University, 1977–78
- Berkshire prize for Best Book, Woman Historian for Liberty's Daughters: The Revolutionary Experience of American Women, 1750–1800, 1980
- Rockefeller Foundation fellow, 1986–87
- Society for Humanities fellow, Cornell University, 1989–90
- John Simon Guggenheim Memorial Foundation fellow, 1993-94
