= Mary Ting Yi Lui =

American historian

- Born: 1967 (age 58–59)
- Education: Princeton University, Cornell University
- Occupations: Professor of History and American Studies, Yale University
- Notable work: The Chinatown Trunk Mystery: Murder, Miscegenation, and Other Dangerous Encounters in Turn-of-the-Century New York City

Mary Ting Yi Lui (born 1967) is Professor of History and American Studies at Yale University and head of Yale's Timothy Dwight College. She is Yale's first tenured professor specializing in Asian American Studies and the first Asian American female to serve as head of a Yale residential college. A former director of undergraduate studies and director of graduate studies for Yale University's American Studies program, she is also affiliated with Yale's Ethnicity, Race, and Migration program and its Women, Gender, and Sexuality Studies program. Lui is the author of The Chinatown Trunk Mystery: Murder, Miscegenation, and Other Dangerous Encounters in Turn-of-the-Century New York City, a co-winner of the 2007 Best Book Prize for History from the Association for Asian American Studies.

== Background ==
Lui received her undergraduate degree from Princeton University in 1989 with an A.B. from the Woodrow Wilson School of Public and International Affairs and a certificate in East Asian Studies. In 2000, she received her Ph.D. in history from Cornell University, studying under Asian American historian Gary Okihiro. Prior to arriving at Yale in 2000, Lui held appointments as a public historian at the Chicago History Museum, as the Charles Gaius Bolin Fellow at Williams College, and as a curator at the Museum of Chinese in America in New York City.

== Writings ==
Mary Lui's first book The Chinatown Trunk Mystery: Murder, Miscegenation, and Other Dangerous Encounters in Turn-of-the-Century New York City examines the unsolved 1909 murder of Elsie Sigel to explore race, gender, and interracial sexual relations in the formation of New York City Chinatown, 1870–1920. Using a variety of English and Chinese-language sources such as census data, church records, reportage, and immigration files, Lui argues that coverage of the case magnified public hostility toward inter-racial relationships and further restricted Chinese mobility in New York City's Chinatown.

Lui is currently at work on a new book entitled Making Model Minorities: Asian Americans, Race, and Citizenship in Cold War America at Home and Abroad, which examines the history of Asian Americans and U.S. cultural diplomacy in Asia during the Cold War.
