= Henry Guerlac =

American historian

Henry Edward Guerlac (June 14, 1910 – May 29, 1985) was an American historian of science. He was a professor at Cornell University, where he was the Goldwin Smith Professor of History and a member of the Department of History.

== Biography ==
Guerlac earned his PhD in European history from Harvard in 1941.

During World War II, he worked in the MIT Radiation Laboratory with Marie Boas Hall in writing "the history of the laboratory and of the operational use of radar during the war." Boas Hall later joined him as a PhD student at Cornell, completing her studies with him in 1952.

He was awarded the Pfizer Award in 1959 by the History of Science Society for his book Lavoisier: The Crucial Year, and was given the Dexter Award for Outstanding Achievement in the History of Chemistry from the American Chemical Society in 1972. He won the George Sarton Medal, the highest award given by the History of Science Society, in 1973. He served as president of the society from 1957 to 1960. He was a Guggenheim Fellow in 1978, and in 1982 was awarded the Chevalier de la Légion d'Honneur by France.
