= Brian Tierney (medievalist) =

English historian (1922–2019)

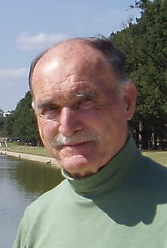
- Born: May 7, 1922; Scunthorpe, North Lincolnshire, England
- Died: November 30, 2019 (aged 97)
- Education: Pembroke College, Cambridge (BA, PhD)
- Known for: Medieval church history, church law, and political theory
- Scientific career
- Fields: Medieval studies
- Workplaces: Catholic University of America; Cornell University

Brian Tierney DFC & Bar (May 7, 1922 – November 30, 2019) was an English historian and medievalist. He was a member of the faculty of the Catholic University of America for eight years until becoming a professor of medieval history at Cornell University in 1959, where he was later appointed as the Goldwin Smith Professor of Medieval History in 1969 and the first Bowmar Professor of Humanistic Studies in 1977.

His speciality was medieval church history, focusing on the structure of the medieval church and the medieval state, and the influences of the interaction between these on the development of Western institutions. He was widely recognized as a leading authority on medieval church law and political thought. His work in these fields also proved relevant to some of the modern debates about Roman Catholic ecclesiology. Tierney's most recent book was Liberty and Law: The Idea of Permissive Natural Law, 1100-1800. (Catholic University Press, 2014). He continued to work on medieval history until the time of his death.

== Early life and military service ==
Tierney was born in 1922 in Scunthorpe, an industrial town in Lincolnshire, England, and grew up there during the Depression years of the 1930s. He was the second of four boys born to John Patrick and Helena (McGuire) Tierney, both of Irish descent. He left school at 16 to begin working in Bristol in southwest England. In January 1941, his home there was destroyed by a German air raid, but fortunately the house was unoccupied at the time and there were no casualties.

Tierney enlisted in the Royal Air Force in July 1941 and served in Bomber Command until 1946, attaining the rank of Flight Lieutenant. He trained as an air navigator, partly in the U.S. at an astronavigation school conducted by Pan American Airways in Miami. After returning to England, he completed a tour of thirty missions flying over Europe in Wellington bombers. He next served for a year as a navigation instructor and then returned to operational flying and completed a second tour of sixty missions on Mosquitoes with 105 Squadron of the elite Pathfinder Force. Tierney was awarded the Distinguished Flying Cross and Bar for his RAF service.

== Academic career ==
In 1946, Tierney was accepted as a student at Pembroke College, Cambridge. He took a shortened course made available to war veterans and graduated in 1948 with First Class Honors. He then began graduate work under the guidance of Walter Ullmann, a learned Austrian scholar who was primarily responsible for introducing the study of medieval canon law to English historians. Tierney completed a Ph.D. thesis in 1951. A revised version was published by Cambridge University Press in 1955 under the title Foundations of the Conciliar Theory.

In 1951, Tierney joined the faculty of The Catholic University of America in Washington D.C. and served as Instructor, Assistant Professor, and Associate Professor in the History Department there until 1959 when he was appointed Professor of Medieval History at Cornell University. In 1969 he was named Goldwin Smith Professor of Medieval History and in 1977 was selected as the first Bryce and Edith M. Bowmar Professor in Humanistic Studies. He retired as Bowmar Professor Emeritus in 1992.

== Academic interests ==
Tierney's work focused mainly on medieval ecclesiology and political theory. It attempted to explain the origins of Western constitutional thought by considering both religious and secular ideas and the ways they influenced one another.

The author's first work, Foundations of the Conciliar Theory, dealt with a fifteenth-century dispute about the constitution of the church. In 1415 the Council of Constance, seeking to heal a long-lasting schism, declared that a general council was superior to a pope in matters of faith and the reform of the church. Tierney argued that this teaching was not just an unfortunate aberration, as modern Catholic theologians came to suppose, but was grounded on an established body of constitutional law that had been formulated in earlier canonistic writings. Although the book was primarily of interest to medievalists it also attracted the attention of some of the expert participants (periti) at Vatican Council II (1962–65) who found in the early sources support for their own vision of the church. When Foundations was reprinted in 1968 one of them described the work as "a book that has profoundly renewed the history of ecclesiological doctrines seen as constitutional theories."

The most controversial of Tierney's works was Origins of Papal Infallibility, 1150-1350, first published in 1972. The definition of papal infallibility promulgated at the Vatican Council of 1870 declared that the infallibility of the pope was a part of "the ancient and constant faith of the church." Tierney asserted that there was no historical evidence for the existence of the doctrine before about 1300 and that then it "was invented by a few dissident Franciscans." Since the book called into question the validity of the decree of 1870 it attracted a substantial body of commentary, some favorable, some highly critical. In 1974 Tierney engaged in a published debate with Alfons Stickler, the Prefect of the Vatican Library (and a future cardinal). Although the subject was very sensitive and the two parties held diametrically opposed views, it was noted that the debate was conducted without rancor and with courtesy on both sides. A few years later, at the request of another cardinal, Tierney contributed an article to a festschrift for Cardinal Stickler.

Some thirty years after Tierney's book was published a summing up in the New Catholic Encyclopedia mentioned various criticisms of the work but added that "Most scholars recognize that Tierney correctly located in the late 13th and early 14th centuries the first discussions of papal infallibility" and that, as regards other disputed points in his work, "the discussion continues."

Tierney's major works on political thought are The Crisis of Church and State, 1050-1300 (1964) and Religion, Law and the Growth of Constitutional Thought, 1150-1650. (The latter work was originally published in 1982 and subsequently appeared in Japanese and Persian translations.) More recently Tierney wrote on natural law and natural rights in The Idea of Natural Rights. Studies on Natural Rights, Natural Law and Church Law (1997) and Liberty and Law. The Idea of Permissive Natural Law, 1100-1800 (2014). He also presented his views in many guest lectures including two noteworthy lecture series: ·Wiles Lectures, Queens University, Belfast, "Ecclesiology and Constitutional Thought, 1150-1650"(1979). (http://www.qub.ac.uk/schools/SchoolofHistoryandAnthropology/News/WilesLectureSeries/PastLectures/WilesLectures1954-88/) ·Birkbeck Lectures, Trinity College, Cambridge, "Natural Law and Natural Rights. Languages of Discourse, 1150- 1350" (1985). (http://www.trin.cam.ac.uk/visiting/public-lectures/birkbeck)

== Honors and awards ==
Tierney was a president of the American Catholic Historical Association. He was awarded the honorary degree of Doctor of Theology by Uppsala University, Sweden (1966) and Doctor of Humane Letters by Catholic University (1982). He also received the Award for Scholarly Distinction of the American Historical Association (1993). He was a Member of the American Philosophical Society, a Corresponding Fellow of the British Academy, and a Fellow of the Medieval Academy of America and the American Academy of Arts and Sciences. He was awarded the Haskins Medal of the Medieval Academy ("For a distinguished book in the field of medieval studies") (2001) and the Quasten Medal of Catholic University ("For excellence and leadership in religious studies") (2003).

He received research grants from the Guggenheim Foundation (1955, 1956), The Institute for Advanced Study, Princeton (1961) the American Council of Learned Societies (1961, 1966), and the National Endowment for the Humanities (1977, 1985).

== Publications ==
- Foundations of the Conciliar Theory (Cambridge, 1955)
- Medieval Poor Law (Berkeley and Los Angeles, 1959)
- The Crisis of Church and State, 1050-1300 (New York, 1964)
- Great Issues in Western Civilization, 2 vols. (New York, 1967) (with Donald Kagan and L. Pearce Williams)
- Western Europe in the Middle Ages, 300-1475 (New York, 1970) (with Sidney Painter) (Chinese translation, 1997)
- Origins of Papal Infallibility, 1150-1350 (Leiden, 1972)
- Church law and Constitutional Thought in the Middle Ages (London, 1979)
- Religion, Law and the Growth of Constitutional Thought, 1150-1650 (Cambridge, 1982) (Japanese translation, 1986, French translation, 1993, Persian translation, 2015)
- Western Societies. A Documentary History, 2 vols. (New York, 1984 (with Joan Scott)
- Rights, Laws and Infallibility in Medieval Thought (Aldershot, 1997)
- The Idea of Natural Rights. Studies on Natural Rights, Natural Law and Church Law (Atlanta, 1997) (Italian translation (2002)
- Liberty and Law. The Idea of Permissive Natural Law, 1100-1800 (Washington D.C., 2014)
