= William Channing Russel =

American historian (1814–1896)

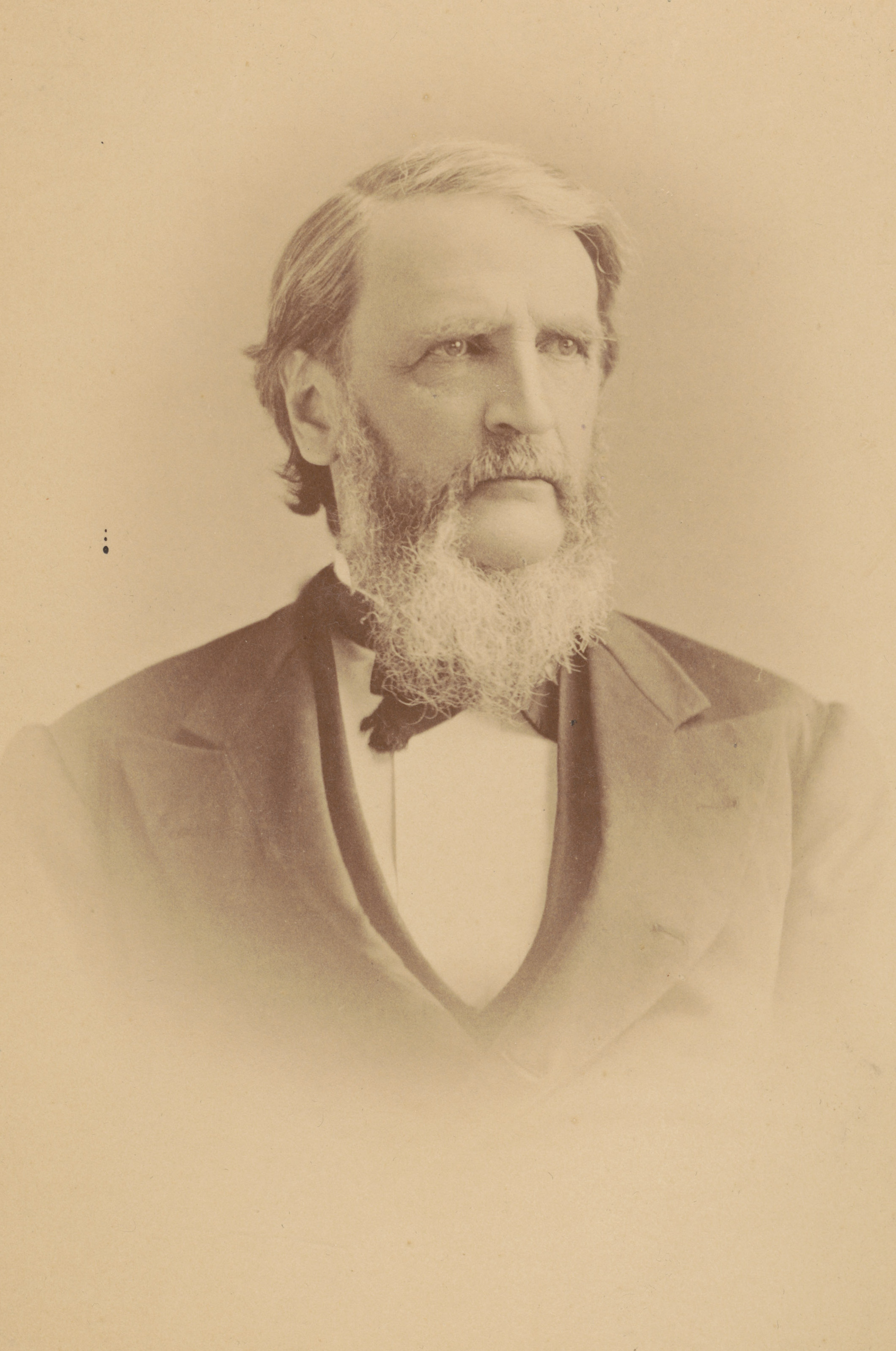
Russel while a professor at Cornell

William Channing Russel (February 23, 1814 – February 24, 1896) was an American historian and lawyer who served as the first vice president of Cornell University from 1870 to 1881. He was also the university's acting president during the absence of Andrew Dickson White. Russel worked closely with White on structuring Cornell in the university's early years.

== Biography ==
William Channing Russel was born on February 23, 1814. He was named after the clergyman William Ellery Channing, his uncle. Russel attended Columbia College and graduated with an AM in 1832. He next attended Harvard Law School. After graduating, Russel practiced law in New York City.

By 1865, Russel was working in the US government's Freedmen's Bureau. Shortly after the end of the Civil War, he took a job as chair of history at the Antioch College. In 1868, the newly established Cornell University hired Russel as a professor of South European languages and associate professor of history, making him one of the university's first two professors. Cornell historian Morris Bishop wrote that Russel's job title marked the "first use of the term 'associate professor' in American higher education." He was also named vice president of the university in 1870, a role he had been de facto carrying out since 1868. Russel was also involved in planning for the university's establishment, and traveled to Germany to study the structure of their universities' history departments. In his capacity as vice president, he served as acting president while Cornell's first president, Andrew Dickson White, was abroad. Russel also urged the adoption of an 'elective system' of curriculum, and closely advised White, for instance urging the admittance of women to the university.

In early 1881, Russel was forced to resign by the Cornell University Board of Trustees with little explanation. He continued to discuss issues concerning the university with White. Shortly afterwards, Russel was hired as the chair of Brown University's history department, a role he held for two years.

== Personal life and death ==
Russel had seven children. He died on February 24, 1896.
