= George Washington Greene =

American historian (1811–1883)

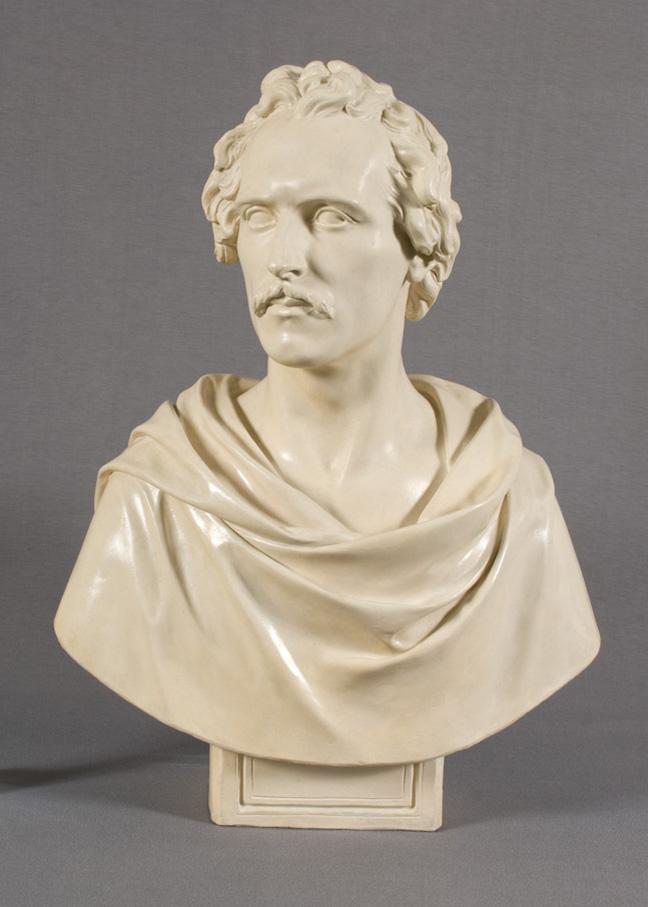
- A bust of Greene by Thomas Crawford
- Born: April 8, 1811; East Greenwich, Rhode Island, US
- Died: February 2, 1883 (aged 71); East Greenwich, Rhode Island, US
- Education: Bowdoin College
- Occupation: Historian
- Spouse: Catherine Van Buren Porter

George Washington Greene (April 8, 1811 – February 2, 1883) was an American historian. He was also the grandson of Major-General Nathanael Greene, a hero of the American Revolutionary War.

== Biography ==
Greene was born in East Greenwich, Rhode Island, to Nathanael Ray Greene and Anna Maria Greene (née Clarke). He was named by his grandmother Catherine (Littlefield) Greene, after the General George Washington. In 1824, as a young teenager, Greene entered Bowdoin College, in Brunswick, Maine. But, during his junior year, he withdrew on account of poor health.

Greene traveled to Europe in the hopes of improving his health. In 1828, while in Italy, he befriended Henry Wadsworth Longfellow and served as the aspiring poet's traveling companion; their friendship lasted 54 years. Greene was in Europe during the majority of the next twenty years, except in 1833–1834, when he was principal of Kent Academy at East Greenwich. He served as the United States consul in Rome from 1837 to 1845.

He married Maria Carlotta Sforzosi, an Italian teenager, in 1828. She traveled with him to Rhode Island and met his friend Henry Wadsworth Longfellow there. The marriage lasted about 20 years before they got a divorce in Italy. "Greene had been having domestic troubles, the facts of which are obscure. After losing his consulship in Rome, he returned to the United States in 1847 without his wife. In a letter of July 30, 1849, to Nicholas Brown, his successor as consul, Greene seems to imply that efforts were being made in Italy to annul his marriage; and in a postscript he refers to a rumor that Maria Carlotta died of a ‘putrid fever’ in Florence in May 1849 (MS, Brown University). Whatever the circumstances, Greene obtained a divorce in 1850. That Longfellow was deeply disturbed by the failure of this marriage is made clear by Greene in a letter to Sumner dated July 34, 1849: ‘I had some faint hope that he [Longfellow] might have written me – but I fear that the blow that has left me alone in the world – has broken the last tie between us.’ (MS Harvard College Library)."

Greene found love again five years later. Longfellow heard from his and Charles Sumner’s mutual friend "that Greene is engaged to Miss Porter of Providence, a girl of eighteen, with no dower but her beaux yeux." Catherine Van Buren Porter was 20 years younger than Greene. They married on February 8, 1852.

He was instructor in modern languages at Brown University from 1848 to 1852. In 1853, he edited Joseph Addison's works, with copious notes (6 vols., New York). He took up residence in East Greenwich once again in 1865; not long afterward he was chosen to represent the town in the Rhode Island General Assembly. He made speeches in 1867 and 1869 on the ratification of the 14th and 15th amendments to the Constitution of the United States.

In 1871-1875 he was a non-resident lecturer in American history in the Department of History at Cornell University in Ithaca, New York. When he returned to East Greenwich, his good friend Longfellow purchased a home for him, which is still standing at 144 Division Street. Shortly after, a windmill was attached to the house. Greene died at East Greenwich, Rhode Island, on February 2, 1883. His grave lies next to his father's, in Newport, Rhode Island.

== Selected list of works ==
- French and Italian textbooks
- Historical Studies (1850)
- Biographical Studies (1860)
- Historical View of the American Revolution (1865)
- Life of Nathanael Greene (3 vols, 1867–1871)
- The German Element in the War of American Independence (1876)
- Short History of Rhode Island (1877).
