= L. Arthur Minnich =

L. Arthur Minnich (November 12, 1918 – 1990) was born in Lorain, Ohio, and graduated from Princeton University in 1940. After serving in the army during World War II he earned a doctorate in history from Cornell University and then taught history at Lafayette College from 1948 to 1952.

In June 1952 Minnich joined Dwight D. Eisenhower’s campaign staff. When Eisenhower became president, Minnich joined the White House staff as Assistant Staff Secretary. His job was to keep records of Eisenhower’s presidential activities, for which his training as a historian admirably suited him. Minnich kept minutes of Eisenhower’s Cabinet and Legislative Leaders meetings. He compiled a detailed daily log of Eisenhower’s official activities. He also worked with the National Archives and Records Administration to compile Eisenhower’s official presidential papers. These were later published in a series of volumes titled Public Papers of the President.

In August 1960 Minnich transferred to the Department of State where he helped coordinate U.S. policy toward the United Nations Economic and Social Council. After retiring in 1976, he continued to be active in matters regarding the Eisenhower administration, and served as executive secretary of the Eisenhower World Affairs Institute from 1983 to 1986.
