= Douglas Greenberg =

American historian

Douglas Greenberg is professor emeritus of history at Rutgers, the State University of New Jersey. Previously, he was executive dean of the School of Arts and Sciences (2008–2012) at Rutgers. In the past, he served as a professor of history at the University of Southern California, executive director of the USC Shoah Foundation Institute for Visual History and Education, and president of the Chicago Historical Society.

== Biography ==
Greenberg's professional career in history began with a bachelor's degree with Highest Honors in history in 1969 from Rutgers University. This was soon followed up with a master's degree as well as a PhD in history from Cornell University in 1971 and 1974, respectively. In the early 1980s, Greenberg taught and served as a dean at Princeton University. Simultaneously, he was chair of the New Jersey Historical Commission. In 1986, he left Princeton to become vice president of the American Council of Learned Societies.

Though his studies trained him as an historian in early American history, Greenberg's own studies prepared him for his career in public history in general. In 1993, Greenberg went to the Chicago Historical Society, where he became president and CEO. During Greenberg's tenure, he oversaw several exhibitions and documentaries on the history of Chicago, which included its first online exhibition, The Great Chicago Fire and the Web of Memory. He also focused resources on advancing the technology used at the Historical Society, including developing a website that included public access catalogs and digitized materials of many kinds.

In 2000, Greenberg became the executive director and CEO of Survivors of the Shoah Visual History Foundation, the organization founded by Steven Spielberg to document on video the testimonies of survivors of the Holocaust. While at the Shoah Foundation, Greenberg negotiated the agreement that made the foundation part of the University of Southern California. He also oversaw the complete indexing of 52,000 testimonies, initiated a comparable project to collect testimonies of survivors of the Rwandan genocide, and greatly expanded the scholarly reach of the foundation, whose name was changes to USC Shoah Foundation Institute for Visual History and Education. While serving as executive director of the institute, he was also professor of history at USC.

He assumed the executive dean's position in the School of Arts and Sciences at Rutgers in 2008. In 2012, he returned to the classroom and taught courses in American Legal History and the History of the Holocaust and Genocide. He retired from Rutgers in 2016.

Over the course of his career, Greenberg published widely on early American history, public history, and the impact of technology on scholarship and libraries. He also received fellowships from the National Endowment for the Humanities and the John Simon Guggenheim Foundation. He served widely on non-profit boards including those of the American Historical Association, the Organization of American Historians, and the Research Libraries Group. While living in California, he was chair of the California Council on the Humanities. After returning to New Jersey in 2008, he became chair of the New Jersey Humanities Council. He currently serves as chair of the development and governance committee of Maryland Humanities.

== Advisory/leading roles ==
- Executive dean, School of Arts and Sciences, Rutgers, The State University of New Jersey -- http://sas.rutgers.edu/index.php?option=com_content&task=blogcategory&id=217&Itemid=274
- Executive director, USC Shoah Foundation Institute for Visual History and Education -- https://web.archive.org/web/20061104020508/http://www.usc.edu/schools/college/vhi/
- President and CEO, Chicago Historical Society -- http://www.chicagohs.org/
- Vice President, American Council of Learned Societies -- http://www.acls.org/
