= Dominick LaCapra =

American historian

Dominick LaCapra (born 1939) is an American-born historian of European intellectual history, best known for his work in intellectual history and trauma studies. He served as the Bryce and Edith M. Bowmar Professor of Humanistic Studies at Cornell University, where he is now a professor emeritus.

== Early life and education ==
LaCapra received his B.A. from Cornell and his Ph.D. from Harvard. He began teaching at the Cornell University Department of History in 1969.

== Career ==
LaCapra's work has helped to transform intellectual history and its relations to cultural history as well as other approaches to the past. His goal has been to explore and expand the nature and limits of theoretically informed historical understanding. His work integrates recent developments in critical theory, such as post-structuralism and psychoanalysis, and examines their relevance for the rethinking of history. It also explores and elaborates the use in historical studies of techniques developed in literary studies and aesthetics, including close reading, rhetorical analysis, and the problem of the interaction between texts or artifacts and their contexts of production and reception. In addition to its role in the field of history, LaCapra's work has been widely discussed in other humanities and social science disciplines, notably with respect to trauma theory and Holocaust studies.

At Cornell, where he is now professor emeritus, LaCapra has held joint appointments in the departments of History and Comparative Literature. He served for two years as Acting Director and for ten years as Director of the Cornell Society for the Humanities. He is a senior fellow of the School of Criticism and Theory; of which he was associate director from 1996–2000 and director from 2000-2008.

LaCapra is a member of the American Academy of Arts and Sciences (2006–present).

== Works ==
=== Books ===
- Emile Durkheim: Sociologist and Philosopher (Cornell University Press, 1972; reissued in 1985 by University of Chicago Press; revised edition in 2001 by The Davies Group)
- A Preface to Sartre (Cornell University Press, 1978)
- Madame Bovary on Trial (Cornell University Press, 1982)
- Rethinking Intellectual History: Texts, Contexts, Language (Cornell University Press, 1983)
- History & Criticism (Cornell University Press, 1985)
- History, Politics, and the Novel (Cornell University Press, 1987)
- Soundings in Critical Theory (Cornell University Press, 1989)
- Representing the Holocaust: History, Theory, Trauma (Cornell University Press, 1994)
- History and Memory after Auschwitz (Cornell University Press, 1998)
- History and Reading: Tocqueville, Foucault, French Studies (University of Toronto Press, 2000)
- Writing History, Writing Trauma (Johns Hopkins University Press, 2001)
- History in Transit: Experience, Identity, Critical Theory (Cornell University Press, 2004)
- History and Its Limits: Human, Animal, Violence (Cornell University Press, 2009)
- History, Literature, Critical Theory (Cornell University Press, 2013)
- Understanding Others: Peoples, Animals, Pasts (Cornell University Press, 2018)

=== Edited books ===
- With S. L. Kaplan, Modern European Intellectual History: Reappraisals and New Perspectives (Cornell University Press, 1982)
- The Bounds of Race: Perspectives on Hegemony and Resistance (Cornell University Press, 1991)

=== Articles ===
- "Chartier, Darnton, and the Great Symbol Massacre," The Journal of Modern History Vol. 60, No. 1, March 1988
- "History, Language, and Reading: Waiting for Crillon," The American Historical Review Vol. 100, No. 3, June 1995
- "Equivocations of Autonomous Art", Critical Inquiry Vol. 24, No. 3, Spring 1998
- "Resisting Apocalypse and Rethinking History" [Manifestos for History, ed K. Jenkins et al., 2007]

=== Other ===
- Rethinking History 8, no. 4 (2004), a volume focused on LaCapra’s work, includes an invited essay by him ("Tropisms of Intellectual History") and four other essays (by Ernst van Alphen, Carolyn J. Dean, Allan Megill, and Michael S. Roth) discussing his career and role in the profession.
