= Jack Metzler =

Jack Metzler may refer to:

- John C. Metzler, Sr. (1909–1990), superintendent of Arlington National Cemetery, 1951–1972
- John C. Metzler, Jr. (born 1947), superintendent of Arlington National Cemetery, 1991–2010
