= John C. Metzler =

John C. Metzler may refer to:

- John C. Metzler Sr., superintendent of Arlington National Cemetery
- John C. Metzler Jr., his son, American civil servant and superintendent of Arlington National Cemetery
