= Senator Piper =

Senator Piper may refer to:

- Pat Piper (politician) (1934–2016), Minnesota State Senate
- William Piper (1774–1852), Pennsylvania State Senate
