= Circuit preacher =

Type of Christian minister

A circuit preacher is a Christian minister who, in response to a shortage of ministers, officiates at multiple churches in an area, thus covering a "circuit".

Circuit preaching became common during and between the Second Great Awakening and Third Great Awakening in the United States. The style was most common west of the Appalachian Mountains, where American settlement pushed westward throughout the 19th century. In the early years of the U.S., many new churches did not yet have a permanent pastor or structure, and in response, the Methodist Episcopal Church, which had a polity allowing it to assign clergy without regard to what the individual minister might desire, assigned ministers to rural and frontier "circuits." They became known as circuit riders.

With the increase in U.S. population and the rise of urban areas, most church members joined congregations that were large enough that they were not part of a circuit, but many small rural areas kept circuit preachers because it is more economical for churches to share a minister, and because one very small congregation does not provide enough "work" for a full-time minister. Circuit preaching is a way to provide "trained" (as opposed to "lay") clergy for small congregations. Even in the 21st Century it is still common for small congregations of all denominations to share clergy, especially in rural areas of the U.S.

Katarina Schuth has published a sociological study of Catholic priests who serve multiple parishes, and some of what she says applies to any "circuit preacher" clergy.

== See also ==
- Circuit (LCMS)
