= Pat Piper =

Pat Piper may refer to:

- Pat Pieper (1886–1974), Chicago Cubs field (public address) announcer
- Pat Piper (politician) (1934–2016), Minnesota politician
