= Maria Ruud =

American politician (born 1961)

Member of the Minnesota House of Representatives from the 42A district
- In office January 4, 2005 – January 3, 2011
- Preceded by: Peter H. Adolphson
- Succeeded by: Kirk Stensrud

Personal details
- Born: 1961 (age 64–65)
- Party: Democratic (DFL)
- Spouse: Mark
- Children: 2
- Education: University of Minnesota (BSN); University of California (MSN)
- Profession: Nurse, legislator

Maria Ruud (born 1961) is a Minnesota politician and a former member of the Minnesota House of Representatives who represented District 42A, which includes portions of western Hennepin County in the Twin Cities metropolitan area.

A Democrat, Ruud was first elected in 2004 when she defeated incumbent Rep. Peter H. Adolphson. She was re-elected in 2006 and 2008, but was surprisingly unseated by over 100 votes by Republican Kirk Stensrud in the 2010 general election.

Ruud served as vice chair of the Energy Finance and Policy Division Committee, and was a member of the Education Finance and Economic Competitiveness Finance Division, the Health and Human Services, the Health Care and Human Services Finance Division, and the Mental Health Division committees.

Ruud is a Clinical Associate Professor at the University of Minnesota School of Nursing. She graduated from Bloomington Jefferson High School in Bloomington, then went on to the University of Minnesota, receiving her B.S.N. She later earned her M.S.N. at the University of California, San Francisco and Doctorate of Nursing Practice from St Catherine University.
