= Elna Jane Hilliard Grahn =

American woman who served during World War II

Elna Jane Hilliard Grahn (November 15, 1913 – August 3, 2006) served in the Women's Army Auxiliary Corps (WAAC) and later the Women's Army Corps (WAC) during World War II. Grahn commanded the 2525th WAC unit in Fort Myer, Virginia. Grahn was the first woman to serve on a United States Army General Court Martial.

== Early life ==
Elna Jane Hilliard was born on November 15, 1913, in Baraboo, Wisconsin to Charles Hilliard and Anna (Eagan) Hilliard. She went to school in Baraboo and Madison, Wisconsin, and in Winona, Minnesota.

== Military service in World War II ==
During World War II, first, Hilliard served in the Women's Army Auxiliary Corps (WAAC), where she headed up a secret Army experiment to determine the way that women might be used in an anti-aircraft battery.

After the WAAC was dissolved she commanded the 2525th Women's Army Corps (WAC) unit in Fort Myer, Virginia. Hilliard was the first woman to serve on a United States Army General Court Martial.

== Teaching career ==
In 1931 she entered the College of Saint Teresa at Winona. She earned a B.S. in math in 1935 from the University of Wisconsin. She began as a math and physical education teacher at Kohler, Wisconsin. in 1936.

Hilliard earned M.S. in math and education in 1941 from the University of Wisconsin. In 1941-42 she went on to be a math instructor and women's counselor in Emmetsburg, Iowa at a junior college and high school.

After interrupting her teaching career for military service during World War Two, in 1946-47 she returned to teaching as a math instructor at Butler University in Indianapolis, Indiana. In 1947 she began teaching at the University of Idaho, serving as math instructor from 1947 to 1949. In 1949, Hilliard attended Stanford University for a degree in Higher Education. From 1954 to 1969, she took a supervisory role for freshman and graduate assistants math courses. Grahn retired a Professor Emerita from the University of Idaho in 1969.

== Personal life ==
Hilliard met Edgar Grahn, a fellow faculty member at University of Idaho, and they married in 1950. Edgar Grahn died in 1995.

== Death and legacy ==
Grahn died on August 3, 2006, and was buried with full military honors at Arlington National Cemetery.
