= Kirk Stensrud =

American politician

Member of the Minnesota House of Representatives from the 48A district
- In office January 4, 2011 – January 7, 2013
- Preceded by: Maria Ruud
- Succeeded by: Yvonne Selcer

Personal details
- Born: March 1962 (age 64) Bloomington, Minnesota
- Party: Republican Party of Minnesota
- Spouse: Wendy
- Children: 3
- Education: Bethel University
- Profession: Small business owner, legislator

Kirk D. Stensrud (born March 1962) is a Minnesota politician and former member of the Minnesota House of Representatives who represented District 48A, which included portions of western Hennepin County in the Twin Cities metropolitan area. A Republican, he is the current owner of Fish Window Cleaning in Edina and in 2017 became the owner of the Dammon Round Barn Farm a Minnesota Wedding venue in Red Wing, MN. He also had experience as a former medical salesperson.

Stensrud was first elected to the House in 2010, unseating incumbent Rep. Maria Ruud by 107 votes. He served on the Commerce and Regulatory Reform, the Jobs and Economic Development Finance, and the State Government Finance committees.

During Stensrud's tenure in the House, he supported merit pay for high performing teachers, and was part of the creation of a budget surplus which involved borrowing money from schools against future tobacco settlements to solve a serious budget deficit.

Stensrud was Narrowly defeated by Democrat Yvonne Selcer by just over 200 votes in the 2012 election. In 2014 Stensrud lost by less than 40 votes.

Stensrud graduated from Bloomington Lincoln High School in Bloomington, then went on to Bethel University in Arden Hills, earning his B.A. in business. He and his family were active members of Wooddale Church in Eden Prairie until they moved in 2017 to Red Wing, MN to begin their business at a Minnesota Wedding Venue known as The Round Barn Farm Bed and Breakfast and Event Center.
