= Dan Sparks =

American politician (born 1968)

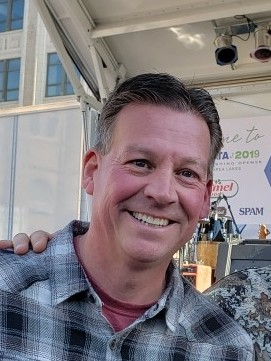

Member of the Minnesota Senate from the 27th district
- In office January 7, 2003 – January 5, 2021
- Preceded by: Grace Schwab
- Succeeded by: Gene Dornink

Personal details
- Born: July 5, 1968 (age 58) Austin, Minnesota, U.S.
- Party: Democratic (DFL)
- Spouse: Andrea
- Children: 4
- Education: University of Minnesota; St. Cloud State University
- Occupation: Banker, legislator

Daniel D. Sparks (born July 5, 1968) is an American politician and former member of the Minnesota Senate. A member of the Minnesota Democratic–Farmer–Labor Party (DFL), he represented District 432 which included all or portions of Dodge County, Faribault County, Freeborn County, Mower County, and Steele County in the southeastern part of Minnesota.

== Early life and education ==
Sparks attended college at the University of Minnesota and St. Cloud State University in St. Cloud.

== Elections ==
Sparks was elected to the Senate in 2002, defeating Senator Grace Schwab by seven votes after an automatic recount. He was reelected in 2006, 2010, 2012, and 2016. In the 2020 election, Sparks was defeated by Republican Gene Dornink.

2020 Minnesota State Senate District 27
Party	Candidate	Votes	%	±%
Democratic (DFL)	Dan Sparks (Incumbent)	17,941	44.37	−10.39
Republican	Gene Dornink	19,759	48.87	+3.70

2016 Minnesota State Senator- Senate 27
Party	Candidate	Votes	%	±%
Democratic (DFL)	Dan Sparks (Incumbent)	20540	54.76	−13.46
Republican	Gene Dornink	16944	45.17	+13.48

2012 Minnesota State Senator- Senate 27
Party	Candidate	Votes	%	±%
Democratic (DFL)	Dan Sparks (Incumbent)	26552	68.22	
Republican	Linden Anderson	12334	31.69	

2010 Minnesota State Senator- Senate 27
Party	Candidate	Votes	%	±%
Democratic (DFL)	Dan Sparks (Incumbent)	17574	61.44	
Republican	Kathy Green	11005	38.48	

2006 Minnesota State Senator- Senate 27
Party	Candidate	Votes	%	±%
Democratic (DFL)	Dan Sparks (Incumbent)	21739	67.72	
Republican	George Marin	10329	32.18	

2002 Minnesota State Senator- Senate 27
Party	Candidate	Votes	%	±%
Democratic (DFL)	Dan Sparks	15091	45.54	
Republican	Grace Schwab (Incumbent)	15084	45.52	
Independence	Terry Kelley	2066	8.90	

== Personal life ==
He, his wife Andrea Sparks and 15-year-old son Nik sparks. Dan has worked in road construction, at the Austin Hormel plant, at Farmers and Merchants Bank in Austin and on the family farm. Dan sparks has also been on the YMCA Board of Directors, is a member of the local Lions Club, and he was the head coach for youth hockey and Little League.
