= Catherine Chesla =

American professor and nurse

Catherine Ann Chesla
- Education: University of California, San Francisco; University of Washington
- Scientific career
- Workplaces: University of California, San Francisco
- Thesis: Parents' caring practices and coping with schizophrenic offsprings : an interpretive study (1988)

Catherine "Kit" Ann Chesla is an American nurse who is Professor Emeritus and former Thelma Shobe Endowed Chair at the University of California, San Francisco School of Nursing. Her research has considered families and chronic illness.

== Early life and education ==
Chesla was an undergraduate student at the College of Saint Teresa, where she earned her bachelor's degree in nursing in 1974. She moved to the University of Washington for graduate studies, where she earned a Master of Science in Nursing in 1978. Her Master's research considered social participation and alienation amongst migrant communities. Afterwards, she joined the University of California, San Francisco, where she completed her doctoral research in parents' caring practices.

== Research and career ==
Chesla studied how families and family culture impact health. She studied how family-related issues, such as conflict and family isolation, impact risk factors for chronic conditions. Evidence indicates that family traits such as emotional closeness and supportive relationships are protective against issues such as depression, migraines and schizophrenia. Chesla decided to investigate the aspects of family life that contributed to the management of chronic conditions. In particular, Chesla studied families from a broad array of cultural backgrounds, and identified how certain models of care can clash with family processes. In 2008, Chesla was named the Thelma Shobe Endowed Chair in Ethics and Spirituality. She served as Chair of the Department of Family Health Care Nursing until 2017.

== Awards and honors ==
- 2003 Fellow of the American Academy of Nursing
- 2007 Distinguished Contributions to Family Nursing Research
- 2008 Thelma Shobe Endowed Chair in Ethics and Spirituality
- 2011 UCSF School of Nursing Excellence in Teaching
- 2013 UCSF School of Medicine Helen Nahm Research Lecture

== Selected publications ==
- P. Benner; C. Tanner; C. Chesla (1 March 1992). "From beginner to expert: gaining a differentiated clinical world in critical care nursing". Advances in Nursing Science. 14 (3): 13–28. doi:10.1097/00012272-199203000-00005. ISSN 0161-9268. PMID 1550330. Wikidata Q38473953.
- Soohyun Nam; Catherine Chesla; Nancy A. Stotts; Lisa Kroon; Susan L. Janson (5 March 2011). "Barriers to diabetes management: patient and provider factors". Diabetes Research and Clinical Practice. 93 (1): 1–9. doi:10.1016/j.diabres.2011.02.002. ISSN 0168-8227. PMID 21382643. Wikidata Q37850572.
- Tanner CA; Benner P; Chesla C; Gordon DR (1 January 1993). "The phenomenology of knowing the patient". Journal of Nursing Scholarship. 25 (4): 273–280. doi:10.1111/j.1547-5069.1993.tb00259.x. ISSN 1527-6546. PMID 8288293. Wikidata Q52228328.

=== Books ===
- Benner, Patricia E. (2009). Expertise in nursing practice : caring, clinical judgment & ethics. Christine A. Tanner, Catherine A. Chesla (2 ed.). New York: Springer. ISBN 978-0-8261-2545-3. OCLC 319062774.
