= Laurie Pryor =

American politician

Member of the Minnesota House of Representatives from the 49A district
- In office January 3, 2017 – January 14, 2025
- Preceded by: Yvonne Selcer
- Succeeded by: Alex Falconer

Personal details
- Born: 1956 or 1957 (age 69–70)
- Party: Minnesota Democratic–Farmer–Labor Party
- Children: 3
- Education: Carleton College; University of Minnesota

Laurie Pryor (born 1956/57) is an American politician who served in the Minnesota House of Representatives from 2017 to 2025. A member of the Minnesota Democratic–Farmer–Labor Party (DFL), Pryor represented District 49A in the western Twin Cities metropolitan area, which includes the cities of Eden Prairie and Minnetonka and parts of Hennepin County.

== Early life, education, and career ==
Pryor graduated from Austin High School in Austin, Minnesota. She attended Carleton College, graduating with a Bachelor of Arts in English. She later attended the University of Minnesota, graduating with a Master of Arts in speech communications.

Pryor was a management analyst for the Minnesota Department of Administration, a business consultant, a coordinator of volunteer programs for Vail Place, and a program coordinator for Hopkins Community Education. She worked on Yvonne Selcer's campaign for the Minnesota House.

== Minnesota House of Representatives ==
Pryor was first elected to the Minnesota House of Representatives in 2016, after the retirement of DFL incumbent Yvonne Selcer, and was reelected every two years through 2022. She chaired the Education Policy Committee, and sat on the Education Finance and Human Services Finance Committee. She did not seek reelection in 2024.

== Electoral history ==
2016 Minnesota State House - District 48A
Party	Candidate	Votes	%
Democratic (DFL)	Laurie Pryor	12,984	51.66
Republican	Mary Shapiro	12,110	48.18
Write-in		40	0.16
Total votes		25,134	100.0
Democratic (DFL) hold			

2018 Minnesota State House - District 48A
Party	Candidate	Votes	%
Democratic (DFL)	Laurie Pryor (incumbent)	13,980	59.39
Republican	Ellen Cousins	9,531	40.49
Write-in		27	0.11
Total votes		23,538	100.0
Democratic (DFL) hold			

2020 Minnesota State House - District 48A
Party	Candidate	Votes	%
Democratic (DFL)	Laurie Pryor (incumbent)	16,348	60.91
Republican	Eric Wessels	10,478	39.04
Write-in		12	0.04
Total votes		26,838	100.0
Democratic (DFL) hold			

2022 Minnesota State House - District 49A
Party	Candidate	Votes	%
Democratic (DFL)	Laurie Pryor (incumbent)	14,213	63.00
Republican	Ryan Chase	8,331	36.93
Write-in		16	0.07
Total votes		22,560	100.0
Democratic (DFL) hold			

== Personal life ==
Pryor and her husband, Jon, have lived in Minnetonka, Minnesota, since 1989. They have three children.
