= Mary Molloy =

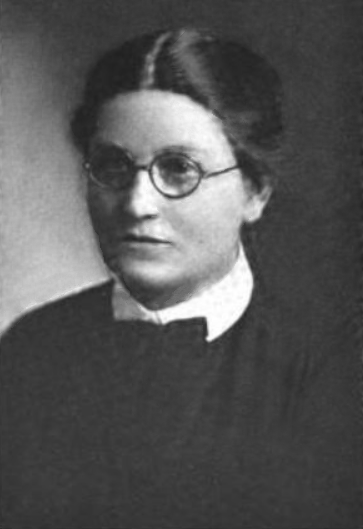
- Born: Mary Aloysia Molloy; June 14, 1880; Sandusky, Ohio
- Died: September 27, 1954 (aged 74); Rochester, Minnesota
- Education: Cornell University
- Occupation: Educator

Mary Aloysia Molloy (June 14, 1880 – September 27, 1954) was president of the College of Saint Teresa from 1928 through 1946.

== Biography ==
Molloy was born in Sandusky, Ohio, the only child of Irish immigrants. She attended Sandusky High School where she won an essay contest by the Ohio Society of the Sons of the American Revolution. She gained admittance to Ohio State University in 1899 and earned a bachelor's degree in philosophy in 1903, with more honors than anyone else up to that time. Molloy won a fellowship to attend graduate school at Ohio State and completed her master's in English philology in 1905. She continued her studies at Cornell University where she completed her doctorate in 1907. Her doctoral thesis, "The Vocabulary of the Old English Bede", was a concordance to the Anglo-Saxon translation of Bede's Historia ecclesiastica gentis Anglorum.

Leo Tracy of the Sisters of Saint Francis of Rochester, Minnesota, and directoress of Winona Seminary, wished her teaching staff to obtain bachelor's degrees. She wrote to Molloy asking her to come to Winona to instruct the sisters. In August 1907 Molloy responded and went to Winona, Minnesota. Working under Tracy she taught the freshman curriculum. In 1908 she was named the seminary's assistant principal and began teaching second year courses. The seminary became the College of Saint Teresa and Molloy was atypical as the lay dean of a Catholic college.

Molloy delivered remarks at the 1917 convention of the National Catholic Education Association (NCEA) on improving women's education. She voiced her concerns over the future of Catholic colleges at the 1918 convention, criticizing the quality of education. She called for fewer institutions that provided stronger curriculum that included medical and legal training. Bishop Patrick R. Heffron of Winona promoted her cause in Rome and Pope Benedict XV awarded Molloy the Pro Ecclesia et Pontifice medal for her service in women's higher education. It was the first time such an honor was bestowed on an American woman for education.

In 1923 she became the first woman to be appointed to the NCEA's College and University Department executive committee. In 1923 she also became a Franciscan Sister, then known as Sister Mary Aloysius Molloy and in 1928 became the college's president. As an educator, Molloy worked hard to improve the quality of women's education, wrestled with problems particular to Catholic colleges, and carefully oversaw the development of her own school.

By 1946, when Molloy retired, the College of Saint Teresa was an established institution producing graduate women. Molloy died in Rochester, Minnesota at age 74.
