= College of Saint Teresa =

Catholic women's college in Winona, Minnesota, US (1907–1989)

The Seal of the College of Saint Teresa

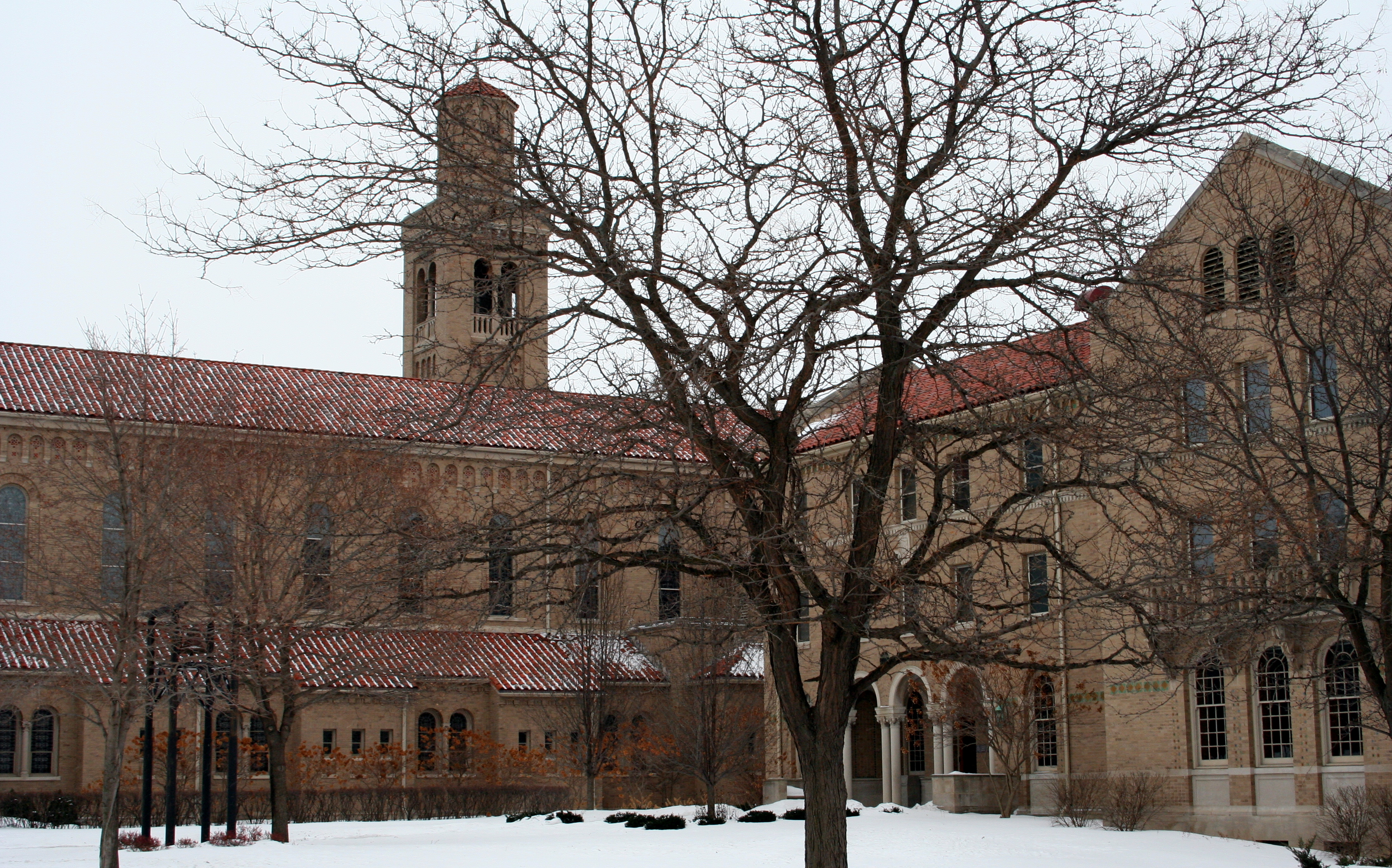
Chapel and convent buildings on the old college campus.

The College of Saint Teresa was a Catholic women's college in Winona, Minnesota, United States. Previously a women's seminary, it became a college in 1907 and was operated by the Sisters of Saint Francis of Rochester, Minnesota until its closing in 1989.

== History ==
Mary Molloy grew up as the only child of Irish Catholic immigrant parents in Sandusky, Ohio. In an age when few women attended college, Molloy earned her way through Ohio State University and graduated, in 1903, with more honors than anyone else up to that time. She went on to earn a master's degree and election to Phi Beta Kappa at Ohio State University. In 1907 she earned her doctorate at Cornell University. That same year, she began her career as a Catholic college educator in Winona, Minnesota, when she accepted a job with the Franciscan Sisters who, under the leadership of Sister Leo Tracy, O.S.F., were creating the liberal arts College of St. Teresa. The two women persevered and successfully established and administered the new collegiate institution for Catholic lay and religious women.

Molloy was unique as the lay dean of a Catholic college, but in 1923 she became a Franciscan Sister, then known as Sister Mary Aloysius Molloy, O.S.F., and in 1928 became the college president. As an educator, Molloy worked to improve the quality of women's education, wrestled with the unique problems of Catholic colleges, and carefully oversaw the development of her own school. By 1946, when she retired, the college was a firmly established institution producing outstanding graduate women. Molloy was one of the last among the founders of Minnesota women's colleges.

== Closure ==
The closing of St. Teresa College came during an era that saw a general decline in women's colleges and the closing of, or switch to coeducation at, many smaller Catholic women's colleges. By the 1970s the college felt the effects of the shifted dedication of smaller religious communities, such as the Sister of Saint Francis, to broader social service.

Recruiting was to some degree hurt by the school's insistence on maintaining a strict code of student conduct years after such things had been abandoned at other colleges. Such rules as nightly curfews and a total, campus-wide ban on alcohol were not eased until the early 1980s, and then only slightly.

As enrollment fell cutbacks in spending were made which, in turn, made it more difficult to attract and retain students. A major layoff of faculty and cutbacks in programs in 1980 led to a large number of student transfers and a corresponding drop in revenues. This, of course, worsened the financial situation and invited further cuts in spending. St. Teresa College might have survived with a reduced enrollment but as enrollment fell it was never able to stabilize at a consistent level.

The college was also hurt to some extent by over-reliance upon its signature nursing program. Junior and senior nursing majors lived and studied in Rochester, Minnesota, fifty miles distant. As enrollment declined this left the main campus in Winona largely empty of upperclasswomen, making campus life unattractive for those who stayed in Winona.

In the 1980s a plan was developed to convert one the school's three large dormitories to a residence for older women who could have access to the college's programs in hopes of reviving St. Teresa College's financial prospects. A model unit was built and prospective residents found but the school was unable to find a bank willing to lend the necessary funds.

Before St. Mary's College went from male to coed in 1969 there were discussions between the two colleges about merger. The potential of such an arrangement is illustrated by the present relationship between the College of Saint Benedict and Saint John's University in Collegeville, Minnesota. Ultimately Saint Teresa broke off the discussions. While this proved in the end to be short-sighted, at the time St. Teresa College had a larger enrollment, higher admissions standards and a superior physical plant.

The two schools then went their separate ways until the mid-1980s when a new president at St. Mary's College, Brother Louis DeThomasis, F.S.C., took an interest in helping St. Teresa College pull through its crisis. Joint programs were established to help expand Saint Teresa's offerings but it was too little too late. At the very end, when closing the college seemed inevitable, DeThomasis proposed a full merger of the two colleges but was vetoed by his Board of Trustees.

== Current status ==
Since its closing, the college has been best known for its scholarship programs available to women attending other Catholic colleges and universities, as well as its connection to the Saint Teresa Leadership and Service Institute at Saint Mary's University of Minnesota. The St. Teresa campus is owned and operated by Cotter High School, a private Catholic high school.

== Presidents ==
- Sister M. Leo Tracy, OSF, 1912–28
- Sister M. Aloysius Molloy, OSF, 1928–46
- Sister M. Rachel Dady, OSF, 1946–52
- Sister M. Camille Bowe, OSF, 1952–69
- Sister M. Joyce Rowland, OSF, 1969–80
- Thomas J. Hamilton, 1980–85
- Sister Michaea Byron, OSF, 1985–89

== Notable alumnae ==
- Catherine Chesla '74 - Professor Emeritus at University of California, San Francisco
- Elizabeth Erickson, painter, feminist artist, and educator
- Pegeen Fitzgerald, radio host, popular for decades in New York City
- Mary Kelly, conceptual artist
- Marie Hastings-Tolsma, PhD, CNM '75 - Professor Nurse-Midwifery; Fulbright U.S. Scholar South Africa 2012-13
- Elna Jane Hilliard Grahn, United States Army officer
- Anne Pellowski, writer
- Pat Piper, Minnesota legislator
- Sister M. Bernetta Quinn (1915-2003), poet and literary critic.
- Sister Mary Leontius Schulte (1901–2000), mathematics educator and historian of mathematics
- Sister Katarina Schuth, O.S.F., educator
- Yvonne Selcer, Minnesota legislator
- Lidia Sogandares, Bachelor of Arts in 1930, first woman doctor in medicine of Central America and Panama
