= Alex Falconer (American politician) =

American politician

Member of the Minnesota House of Representatives from the 49A district
- Incumbent
- Assumed office January 14, 2025
- Preceded by: Laurie Pryor

Personal details
- Born: August 30, 1980 (age 45)
- Party: Democratic (DFL)
- Spouse: Erica
- Children: 3
- Education: Red Wing High School; B.S. in biology, Saint Olaf College
- Occupation: Nonprofit manager; Legislator
- Website: Government website Campaign website

Alex Falconer is an American politician and environmental activist serving since 2025 in the Minnesota House of Representatives. A member of the Minnesota Democratic–Farmer–Labor Party (DFL), he represents District 49A in the southwestern Twin Cities metropolitan area, which includes parts of Eden Prairie and Minnetonka in Hennepin County, Minnesota.

== Early life, education, and career ==
Falconer was born on August 30, 1980. He went to high school at Red Wing High School in Red Wing and later received a Bachelor of Science in biology from Saint Olaf College in Northfield. Before entering politics, he was a campaign manager for Save the Boundary Waters. In 2021, he completed a 110-mile run in the Boundary Waters Canoe Area for the film Boundary Waters Traverse to raise awareness for the campaign and environmental advocacy at large.

== Minnesota House of Representatives ==
Representative Laurie Pryor announced she would not seek reelection in 2024, leaving her seat open. Falconer declared his candidacy and defeated Minnetonka City Council member Kissy Coakley in the DFL primary. In the general election, he defeated Republican nominee Stacy L. Bettison with over 60% of the vote.

== Electoral history ==
2024 Minnesota House of Representatives, DFL primary election - District 49A
Party	Candidate	Votes	%
Democratic (DFL)	Alex Falconer	2,377	74.9
Democratic (DFL)	Kissy C Coakley	798	25.1
Total votes		3,175	100.0

2024 Minnesota House of Representatives election - District 49A
Party	Candidate	Votes	%
Democratic (DFL)	Alex Falconer	16,104	60.81
Republican	Stacy L. Bettison	10,342	39.05
Write-in		37	0.14
Total votes		26,483	100.0
Democratic (DFL) hold			

== Personal life ==
Falconer is an avid outdoorsman and trail runner. He lives in Eden Prairie with his wife, Erica, and three children. He coaches cross country at Minnetonka Middle School East and Nordic skiing at Minnetonka High School.
