= Grace Schwab =

American politician (born 1963)

Member of the Minnesota Senate from the 27th district
- In office January 3, 2001 – January 6, 2003
- Preceded by: Pat Piper
- Succeeded by: district redrawn

Personal details
- Born: August 3, 1963 (age 63) Tallahassee, Florida
- Party: Republican Party of Minnesota
- Spouses: Steve Ray Schwab (divorced 2005); Thomas "Tom" Eugene Keliher (July 2008–Present)
- Children: Gracie Schwab; Katelyn Schwab; Eric Schwab; Mike Keliher (Step-child); Andy Keliher (Step-child); Matt Keliher (Step-child); Katie Keliher (Step-child)
- Education: Minnesota State University, Mankato
- Occupation: Legislator

Grace Elizabeth Stabell Schwab Keliher (born August 3, 1963) is a Minnesota politician and former member of the Minnesota Senate. A member of the Republican Party of Minnesota, she represented District 27, which includes all or portions of Freeborn and Mower counties in the southeastern part of the state.

== Early life, education, and career ==
Born Grace Elizabeth Stabell in Tallahassee, Florida, Keliher graduated from New Ulm High School in New Ulm, Minnesota. She attended college at Minnesota State University, Mankato in Mankato, Minnesota, graduating with her Bachelor of Science (B.S.) in 1986. For 10 years, she served on the Albert Lea School Board.

== Minnesota Senate ==
=== Elections ===
Keliher was elected to the Senate in 2000. She ran for reelection in 2002 and lost to Dan Sparks by seven votes after an automatic recount.

2002 Minnesota State Senator- Senate 27
Party	Candidate	Votes	%	±%
Democratic (DFL)	Dan Sparks	15091	45.54	
Republican	Grace Schwab (Incumbent)	15084	45.52	
Independence	Terry Kelley	2066	8.90	

2000 Minnesota State Senator- Senate 27
Party	Candidate	Votes	%	±%
Democratic (DFL)	Pat Piper (incumbent)	14971	47.27	
Republican	Grace Schwab	16697	52.73	

=== Committee assignments ===
For the 82nd Legislative Session, Schwab was part of the:

- Crime Prevention
- Education
- Education Subcommittee: Early Childhood-Grade 12 Education Budget Division
- Education Subcommittee: Workforce Education
- Taxes
- Taxes Subcommittee: Income and Sales Tax Budget Division
- Transportation

=== Tenure ===
Keliher was sworn in on January 3, 2001. On April 6, 2001, she was appointed to the Minnesota Chicano Latino Affairs Council (Board of Directors). Schwab's first legislative action was authoring a bill that raised the standards for school bus drivers and provided more protection for children.

== Lawsuit ==
Malcolm W. Prinzing accused Keliher of theft. Prinzing had put a sign on the property of Northbridge Mall in Albert Lea in opposition to a school levy. Keliher saw the sign and spoke to the manager of the mall about it. She and the manager removed letters from the sign to make it more neutral. Prinzing went after her in her 2002 reelection campaign, calling her a thief. He took her to court and lost. The jury awarded Keliher $150,000 for defamation. Prinzing appealed to the Minnesota Court of Appeals, but the court upheld the decision.

== Personal life ==
Keliher was married to Steve Ray Schwab. They have three children and divorced in 2005. In 2008, she married Thomas "Tom" Eugene Keliher. She has four stepchildren.
