= Mary Leontius Schulte =

American mathematician, mathematical historian and nun

Sister Mary Leontius Schulte (September 4, 1901 – March 20, 2000) was an American nun, mathematics educator, and historian of mathematics.

== Life ==
Schulte was born as Catherine Mary Schulte, on September 4, 1901, in Cleveland, Manitowoc County, Wisconsin, in a large farming family descended from German immigrants. After finishing high school in Manitowoc, she began studying home economics at the College of Saint Teresa, but graduated in 1923 with a degree in chemistry and three minors including mathematics. She worked as a high school mathematics teacher in Minnesota from 1923 to 1928, taking vows as a nun in the Sisters of Saint Francis of Rochester, Minnesota in 1927.

In 1928, Schulte returned to the study of mathematics as a graduate student at the University of Michigan, primarily taking summer courses there while also becoming an instructor at the College of Saint Teresa. She earned a master's degree in 1931 and completed her Ph.D. in 1935. Her dissertation was supervised by Louis Charles Karpinski.

Although taking a leave to complete her doctorate, Schulte remained at the College of Saint Teresa, earning a promotion to full professor in 1948 and retiring in 1975. In the early 1960s, a local television station broadcast a series of her lectures.

After the College of Saint Teresa closed in 1987, Schulte moved to a home for the Sisters of Saint Francis in Rochester, Minnesota, where she died on March 20, 2000.

== Book ==
Schulte's doctoral dissertation, Additions in Arithmetic, 1483-1700, to the Sources of Cajori's 'History of Mathematical Notations' and Tropfke's 'Geschichte Der Elementar-Mathematik', concerned the history of mathematical notation. It added to the work of Florian Cajori and Johannes Tropfke in this area by describing the notation from over 100 mathematical documents that had been collected at the University of Michigan library and at the Rare Book & Manuscript Library at Columbia University.

In 2015, Docent Press published Schulte's dissertation as a book, Writing the History of Mathematical Notation: 1483–1700, edited by Albrecht Heeffer and Douglas Furman, including also an introduction by Heeffer, bibliographic notes by Furman, and two biographical sketches of Schulte. For this edition of Schulte's work, many instances of mathematical notation, hand-drawn by Schulte for her thesis, were replaced by digital reproductions of the original notations she discusses, showing each notation in its surrounding context.
