= Yvonne Selcer =

American politician

Member of the Minnesota House of Representatives from the 48A district
- In office January 8, 2013 – January 3, 2017
- Preceded by: Kirk Stensrud (District 42A)
- Succeeded by: Laurie Pryor

Personal details
- Born: March 3, 1953 (age 73)
- Party: Minnesota Democratic–Farmer–Labor Party
- Spouse: Charles
- Children: 2
- Education: College of Saint Teresa

Yvonne M. Selcer (born March 3, 1953) is a Minnesota politician and former member of the Minnesota House of Representatives. A member of the Minnesota Democratic–Farmer–Labor Party (DFL), she represented District 48A, which included Hennepin County.

== Early life, education, and career ==
Selcer grew up in Winsted, Minnesota, where she attended high school. After graduating from Holy Trinity High School (Winsted, Minnesota), Selcer moved to Winona, Minnesota to study at the College of Saint Teresa, where she earned her BS in Elementary Education, graduating in 1975.

Selcer first became involved in politics when she was elected to the Hopkins School Board in 2004. She served for a total of eight years, three of which she spent as a director, two as the board's treasurer, and three as its chair.

== Minnesota House of Representatives ==
In 2012, Selcer defeated incumbent Republican Kirk Stensrud by 202 votes. During the campaign, Selcer filed an official complaint against the Republican Party, which sent out a campaign mailer alleging that Selcer had not paid her property taxes. Hennepin County confirmed that Selcer did indeed pay her taxes on time. In 2014, Selcer again defeated Stensrud, both in the general election by 36 ballots, and in a recount conducted November 19, 2014, when her margin of victory increased to 41 votes. She did not seek re-election in 2016.

=== Committee assignments ===
Selcer served on the House Education Finance, Transportation Policy, and Energy Policy committees.

== Personal life ==
Selcer's brother, Tom Ollig, has served intermittently on Winsted's City Council for the past twenty years.

Selcer’s brother-in-law in Senator John Hoffman.
