= Pat Piper (politician) =

American politician (1934–2016)

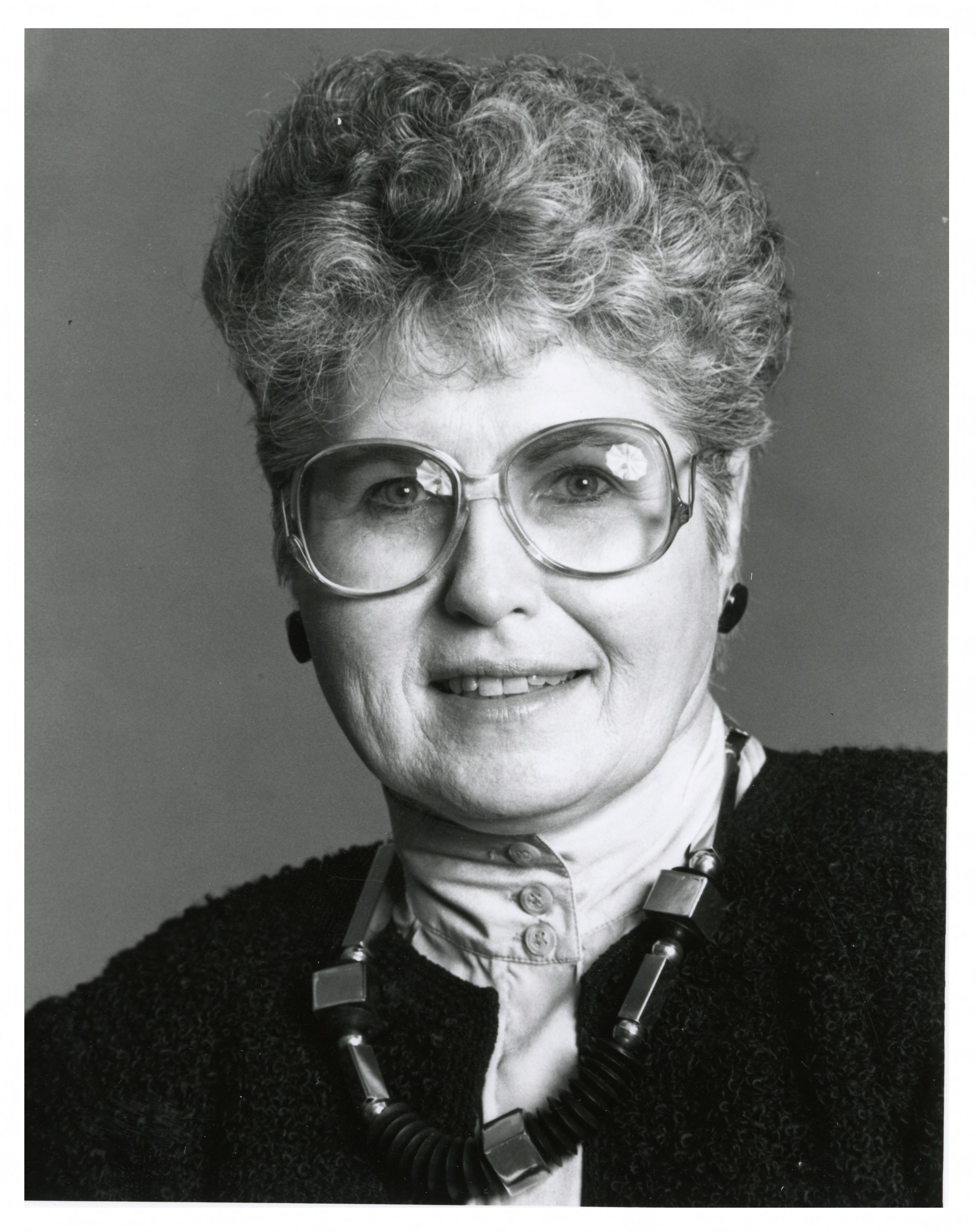

Member of the Minnesota Senate from the 27th district 31st (1987–1993)
- In office January 6, 1987 – January 2, 2001
- Preceded by: Tom A. Nelson
- Succeeded by: Grace Schwab

Member of the Minnesota House of Representatives from the 31B district
- In office January 4, 1983 – January 6, 1987
- Preceded by: Leo J. Reding
- Succeeded by: Leo J. Reding

Personal details
- Born: July 16, 1934 Delavan, Minnesota
- Died: January 31, 2016 (aged 81) Rochester, Minnesota
- Party: Minnesota Democratic–Farmer–Labor Party
- Education: College of Saint Teresa (B.A.); The Catholic University of America (M.A.)
- Occupation: Legislator

Patricia Kathryn "Pat" Piper (July 16, 1934 – January 31, 2016) was a Minnesota politician and member of the Minnesota Senate and the Minnesota House of Representatives. A member of the Minnesota Democratic–Farmer–Labor Party (DFL), she represented District 27 in the Senate and 31B in the House, which includes portions of Freeborn and Mower counties in southern Minnesota. She was a religious education director, ecumenical resource center/consultant/teacher and workshop leader.

== Early life, education, and career ==
Born in Delavan, Minnesota, Piper was one of nine children. Her father fought in World War II. Piper grew up in Blue Earth, Minnesota. She received a B.A. in elementary education from College of Saint Teresa and a B.A. in religious education from The Catholic University of America. Piper was earlier a Roman Catholic religious sister who worked as a religious education director, ecumenical resource center/consultant/teacher and workshop leader at Christian Education Center.

== Minnesota House of Representatives ==
=== Elections ===
Piper was first elected in 1982 and reelected in 1984. In 1986 she ran for State Senate instead of seeking reelection.

1984 Minnesota State Representative- House 31B
Party	Candidate	Votes	%	±%
Democratic (DFL)	Pat Piper (incumbent)	9158	56.90	
Republican	Lee Aase	6223	38.70	

1982 Minnesota State Representative- House 31B
Party	Candidate	Votes	%	±%
Democratic (DFL)	Pat Piper	8798	61.73	
Republican	Chuck Moline	5119	35.92	

=== Committee assignments ===
For the 74th Legislative Session, Piper was a part of:

- Governmental Operations Committee
- Governmental Operations Subcommittee: Property Tax Study Commission
- Health and Human Services Committee
- Health and Human Services Subcommittee: Health Care
- Local and Urban Affairs Committee
- Local and Urban Affairs Subcommittee: Local Government Affairs

For the 73rd Legislative Session, Piper was a part of:

- Energy Committee
- Energy Subcommittee: Energy and Society
- General Legislation and Veterans Affairs Committee
- General Legislation and Veterans Affairs Subcommittee: Gaming Division
- Regulated Industries Committee
- Regulated Industries Subcommittee: Beverage

=== Tenure ===
Piper represented District 31A in the Minnesota House of Representatives from January 4, 1983, to January 6, 1987 (73rd and 74th Legislative Sessions).

== Minnesota Senate ==
=== Elections ===
Piper was elected to the Minnesota Senate in 1986, and reelected in 1990, 1992 and 1996. She lost reelection in 2000 to Grace Schwab.

2000 Minnesota State Senator- Senate 27
Party	Candidate	Votes	%	±%
Democratic (DFL)	Pat Piper (incumbent)	14971	47.27	
Republican	Grace Schwab	16697	52.73	

1996 Minnesota State Senator- Senate 27
Party	Candidate	Votes	%	±%
Democratic (DFL)	Pat Piper (incumbent)	17367	54.39	
Republican	Brian Slowinski	12805	40.10	
Libertarian	Rich Osness	1217	5.51	

1992 Minnesota State Senator- Senate 27
Party	Candidate	Votes	%	±%
Democratic (DFL)	Pat Piper (incumbent)	20092	56.28	
Republican	Mel Eichstadt	14685	41.13	

1990 Minnesota State Senator- Senate 31
Party	Candidate	Votes	%	±%
Democratic (DFL)	Pat Piper (incumbent)	14200	62.03	
Republican	Mel Eichstadt	7884	34.44	

1986 Minnesota State Senator- Senate 31
Party	Candidate	Votes	%	±%
Democratic (DFL)	Pat Piper	13571	61.30	
Republican	Jack Dibble	8567	38.70	

=== Committee assignments ===
For the 80th and 81st Legislative Sessions, Piper was a part of:

- Agriculture and Rural Development Committee
- Children, Families and Learning Committee (chair)
- Children, Families and Learning/Education Finance Subcommittee: Family and Early Childhood Education Budget Division (chair)
- Education Finance Committee
- Health and Family Security Committee
- Health and Family Security/Human Resources Finance Subcommittee: Health and Family Security Budget Division
- Rules and Administration Committee
- Rules and Administration Subcommittee: Permanent and Joint Rules
- Rules and Administration Subcommittee: Personnel

For the 79th Legislative Session, Piper was a part of:

- Family Services Committee (chair)
- Finance Committee
- Finance Subcommittee: Finance State Government Division
- Health Care Committee
- Health Care Subcommittee: Health Care and Family Services Finance Division
- Rules and Administration Committee
- Rules and Administration Subcommittee: Permanent and Joint Rules

For the 78th Legislative Session, Piper was a part of:

- Crime Prevention Committee
- Family Services Committee (chair)
- Finance Committee
- Finance Subcommittee: Finance State Government Division
- Health Care Committee
- Health Care Subcommittee: Health Care and Family Services Finance Division
- Rules and Administration Committee

For the 77th Legislative Session, Piper was a part of:

- Elections and Ethics Committee
- Employment Committee
- Energy and Public Utilities Committee
- Finance Committee
- Finance Subcommittee: Education Division
- Finance Subcommittee: Health and Human Services Division
- Health and Human Services Committee
- Health and Human Services Subcommittee: Health Care Access Division (chair)

For the 76th Legislative Session, Piper was a part of:

- Employment Committee
- Finance Committee
- Finance Subcommittee: Health and Human Services Division
- Health and Human Services Committee
- Health and Human Services Subcommittee: Social Services and Government Administration (chair)
- Health and Human Services Subcommittee: Welfare Reform
- Public Utilities and Energy Committee
- Public Utilities and Energy Subcommittee: Energy
- Public Utilities and Energy Subcommittee: Utilities (chair)

For the 75th Legislative Session, Piper was a part of:

- Employment Committee
- Employment Subcommittee: Injured Workers' Compensation
- Finance Committee
- Finance Subcommittee: Health and Human Services Division
- Health and Human Services Committee
- Health and Human Services Subcommittee: Social Services and Government Administration (chair)
- Health and Human Services Subcommittee: Welfare Reform Division
- Public Utilities and Energy Committee
- Public Utilities and Energy Subcommittee: Alternative Energy

=== Tenure ===
Piper was sworn in on January 6, 1987, serving in the 75th, 76th, 77th, 78th 79th, 80th, and 81st Legislative Sessions. She championed issues such as family support, children, health, human services, and education. She was part of the "Gang of Seven" (with Linda Berglin, Paul Ogren, Duane Benson, Dave Gruenes, Brad Stanius, and Lee Greenfield) that worked to pass bipartisan Minnesota Care. She also pushed legislation to help the Exol Ethanol plant in Glenville, Minnesota. Piper convinced a Senate committee to join her in singing the "Itsy Bitsy Spider" song when children visited the state Capitol to testify about welfare issues. She authored legislation that would require insurance companies to pay for bone marrow transplants as an experimental procedure for women with breast cancer.

== Post-legislative career ==
Piper suggested that she'd apply for the position of chaplain of the Senate, where she could give her numerous original prayers an appropriate audience. Piper also suggested she would be the appropriate candidate to become the director of a child-care center in the state Capitol. Piper stayed involved in the Austin Community, running the Senate Campaign for KAAL TV 6 Anchor Terry Kelley and attending public events. She also became a board member for Minnesota Partnership for Action Against Tobacco.

== Personal life ==
Piper was single and lived in Austin, Minnesota. She died at Cottagewood Senior Community in Rochester, Minnesota.

Minnesota Senate
Preceded by Tom A. Nelson	Senator from the 27th district 31st (1987–1993); 1987–2001	Succeeded by Grace Schwab
Minnesota House of Representatives
Preceded by Leo J. Reding	Member of the House of Representatives from the 31A district 1983-1987	Succeeded by Leo J. Reding
