= Peter H. Adolphson =

American politician

Peter H. Adolphson (born September 7, 1957) is an American businessman and politician.

From Minnetonka, Minnesota, Adolphson served in the United States Navy. He received his bachelor's degree in business from Gustavus Adolphus College and his master's degree in finance from National University, San Diego. He was in business. Adolphson served in the Minnesota House of Representatives and was a Republican.
