= Katarina Schuth =

Katarina Schuth, O.S.F., is an American religious sister and academic.

== Early life and education ==
Mary Ann Schuth was born on a dairy farm near Wabasha, Minnesota, to Marie (née Eversman) and Math Schuth. In 1959, she graduated from St. Felix High School in Wabasha and was named Wabasha County Dairy Princess. Schuth joined the Sisters of Saint Francis of Rochester, Minnesota, in 1960. She took the religious name "Sister M. Katarina" in 1961, when she entered the novitiate. She professed vows in 1963 and made final vows in 1966.

In 1965 Schuth received a bachelor's degree in history from the College of Saint Teresa in Winona, Minnesota. She obtained a master's degree (1969) and a PhD (1973) in cultural geography from Syracuse University; her doctoral thesis was entitled Literacy in Rural India: A Geographic Analysis. She earned a Master of Theological Studies and Licentiate in Sacred Theology from the former Weston Jesuit School of Theology in Cambridge, Massachusetts.

== Career ==
Schuth taught at the College of Saint Teresa and the Weston Jesuit School of Theology. She held an Endowed Professorship for the Social Scientific Study of Religion at The Saint Paul Seminary School of Divinity, in St. Paul, Minnesota, part of the University of St. Thomas.

As a researcher and teacher, Schuth has focused on theological education and the relationship between the Church and American culture. She has written numerous articles and several books on Catholic seminaries.

She also served as chair or member of committees and boards including the Leadership Roundtable Education and Formation Committee of the National Leadership Roundtable on Church Management, the Henry Luce III Fellows in Theology, the Board of Trustees of Catholic Theological Union, Chicago, and the National Advisory Council, Viterbo College, LaCrosse, Wisconsin.

=== Books ===
- Schuth, Katarina (1989). Reason for the Hope: The Futures of Roman Catholic Theologates. Wilmington, Delaware: M. Glazier. ISBN 9780894537721.
- ——— (1999). Seminaries, Theologates, and the Future of Church Ministry: An Analysis of Trends and Transitions. Collegeville, Minnesota: Liturgical Press. ISBN 9780814658611.
- ——— (2006). Priestly Ministry in Multiple Parishes. Collegeville, Minnesota: Liturgical Press. ISBN 9780814618295.
- ——— (2016). Seminary Formation: Recent History, Current Circumstances, New Directions. Collegeville, Minnesota: Liturgical Press. ISBN 9780814648278.

She co-authored:

- Cooperative Ventures in Theological Education published by University Press of America with Fraser, Friar, Radtke, Savage, 1989
- Educating Leaders for Ministry: Issues and Responses published by Liturgical Press 2005

== Awards ==
Schuth's honorary degrees include St. Bonaventure University (1995), Notre Dame Seminary, New Orleans, Louisiana (2000), and Boston College (2004).

Her other honors include awards from the Weston Jesuit School of Theology, the Archdiocese of Saint Paul and Minneapolis, and the National Catholic Educational Association.
