= John C. Metzler Sr. =

Superintendent of Arlington National Cemetery (1909–1990)

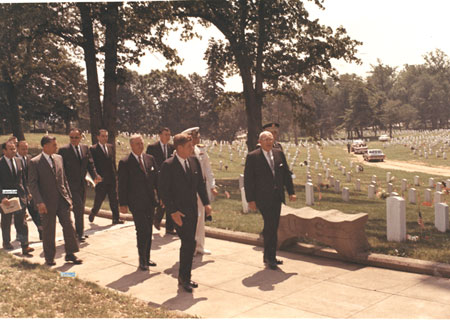
- John C. Metzler (right) with President Kennedy (left) in Arlington National Cemetery, 1963.
- Born: John Charles Metzler; May 8, 1909; Brooklyn, New York, US
- Died: May 25, 1990 (aged 81); Merritt Island, Florida, US
- Resting place: Arlington National Cemetery
- Occupations: Superintendent, Arlington National Cemetery
- Spouse: Bernadette Metzler
- Children: 4, including John C. Metzler Jr.

John C. Metzler (May 8, 1909 – May 25, 1990) was the superintendent of Arlington National Cemetery in Arlington, Virginia from 1951 to 1972. Previously, he was a sergeant in the U.S. Army during World War II.

== Career ==
The availability of land in Arlington National Cemetery has been an issue for many years. In 1966, Metzler nearly doubled the size of Arlington National Cemetery by expanding the grounds. He added approximately 190 acres (0.77 km^{2}) to the original 200 acres (0.81 km^{2}). He also worked to maximize space by inventing a "tiered" burial system; wherein, spouses of deceased individuals are placed in the same plot, but at a different level underground.

Though Metzler administered numerous burials of distinguished people, he is most notable for helping preside over the funerals of John F. Kennedy in 1963 and Robert F. Kennedy in 1968. During John F. Kennedy's funeral, Metzler presented Kennedy's widow, Jacqueline Kennedy Onassis, the folded interment flag from JFK's casket. Metzler was instrumental in choosing the final resting place for the late President.

Metzler also presided over the burials of the Unknown Soldiers of World War II and the Korean War. He is quoted as saying: "I will tell each person what I have told others in the past—that exactly who the men on the hill are is not as important as the fact that they are there. Being there, they are not only representative of other men who died unknown, but of all men who have fought for America. For that reason, they belong to all of us." – May 1958.

As a United States veteran with service during World War II, Metzler is buried in the cemetery which he administered for over twenty years.

== Family ==
- John C. Metzler's son, John C. Metzler Jr., grew up in the cemetery and was its superintendent from 1991 to 2010. Metzler Jr. helped preside over the burial of JFK's widow, Jacqueline Kennedy Onassis, in 1994. Due to a controversy over mismanagement at Arlington National Cemetery, he was issued a letter of reprimand on June 10, 2010.
