= Leo J. Reding =

American politician

Leo John Reding
- Born: June 6, 1924; Austin, Minnesota, United States
- Died: October 12, 2015 (aged 91)
- Education: Bachelor's degree in physical education
- Alma mater: University of St. Thomas
- Occupations: Educator, Politician
- Political party: Democratic

Leo John Reding (June 6, 1924 – October 12, 2015) was an American politician.

Born in Austin, Minnesota, Reding received his bachelor's degree in physical education from the University of St. Thomas. He taught high school and was a meat cutter at the Hormel Plant. Reding served on the Austin city council and as mayor of Austin, Minnesota. From 1975 to 1995, Reding served in the Minnesota House of Representatives and was a Democrat.

== Minnesota’s GLBT Human Rights Act Amendment ==
In 1993, Minnesota passed the first GLBT civil rights laws to include full legal protection for transgender people, as well as gay, lesbian, and bisexual persons. Representative Reding co-authored this bill with Representative Karen Clark after attending a PFLAG meeting and hearing first hand stories of injustice and discrimination.

As documented in Lavender Magazine on the 15th anniversary of the bill's passage:

Clark relates that then-Representative Leo Reding, a moderate-to-conservative DFLer from Austin, asked her, “Hey, Karen, are you going to do that gay rights bill again this year?” She answered, “Yes, Leo, I am,” thinking, “Oh, God, here it comes.” Reding replied, “Good, because I want to be a coauthor with you.”

Reding explained to Clark that constituents and longtime friends had invited him to a meeting of the local chapter of Parents and Friends of Lesbians and Gays (PFLAG). Hearing the experiences of people he knew helped change his mind.
