= John C. Metzler Jr. =

American civil servant (born 1947)

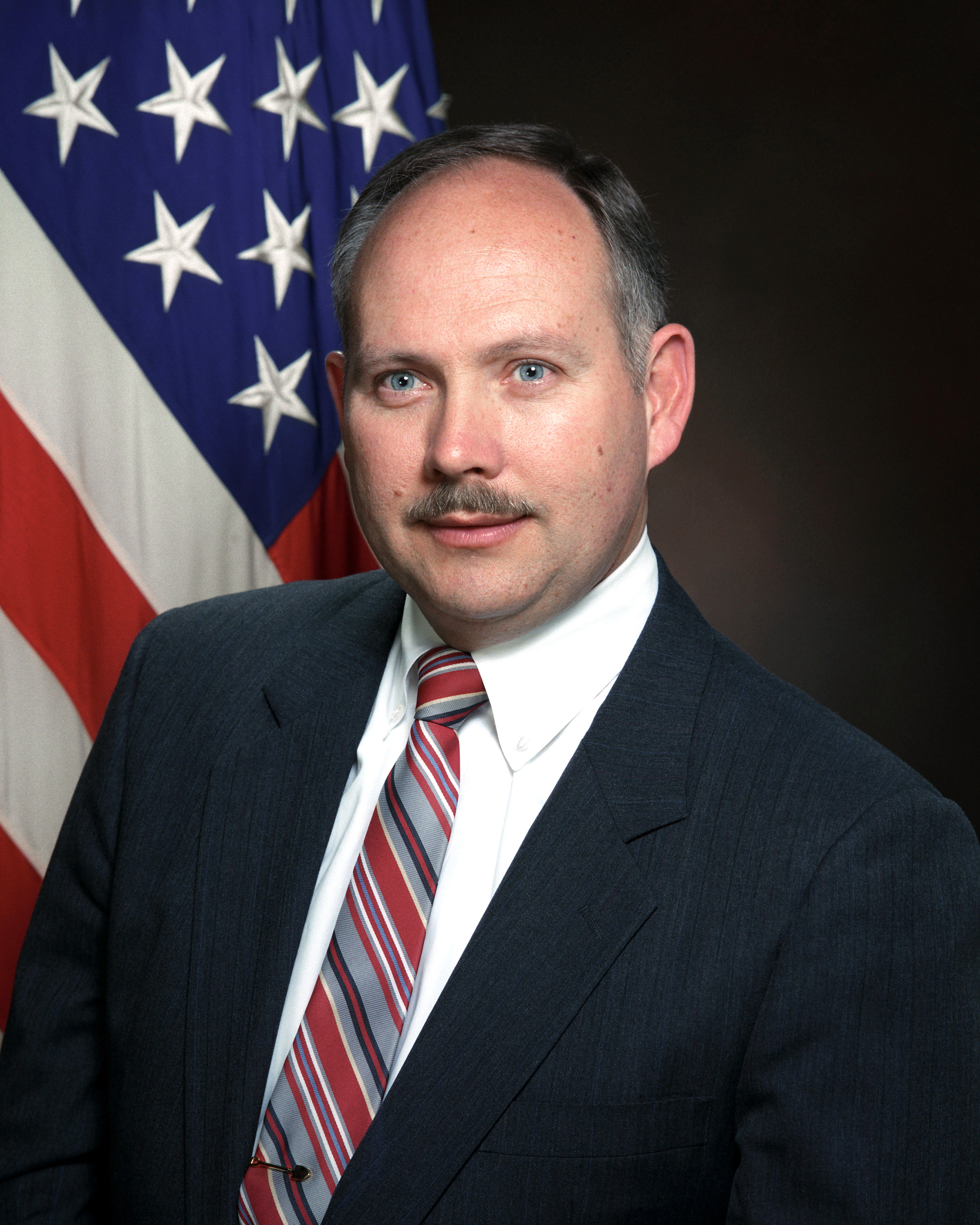
- John C. Metzler Jr. in February 1991
- Born: John Charles Metzler Jr. September 12, 1947 (age 78); New York City, USA
- Occupations: Superintendent, Arlington National Cemetery
- Spouse: Kathleen Metzler
- Children: Daniel Metzler, Douglas Metzler & Matthew Metzler
- Parent(s): John C. Metzler Sr. and Bernadette Metzler

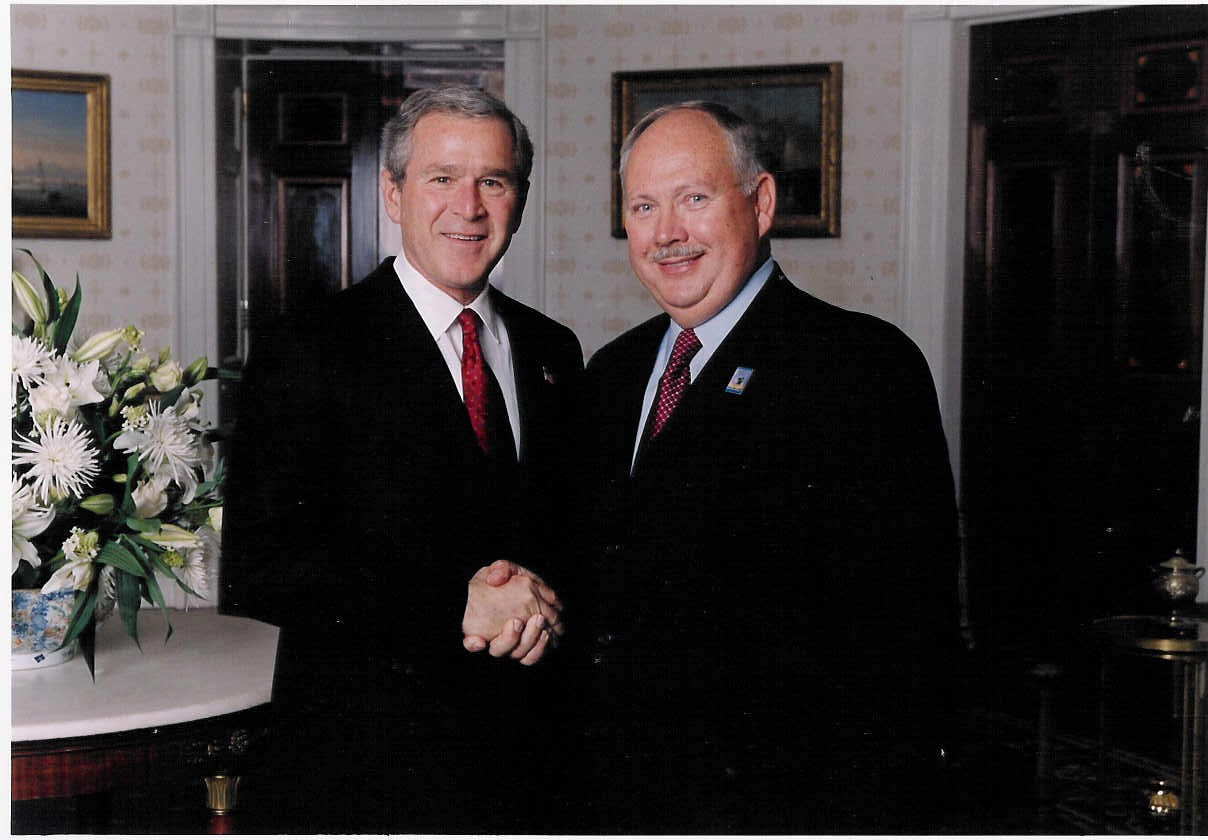
John C. Metzler Jr. with President George W. Bush.

John C. Metzler Jr. (born September 12, 1947) is an American civil servant who was Superintendent of Arlington National Cemetery in Arlington, Virginia, from 1991 to 2010. He achieved notoriety in the press at the end of his tenure due to the Arlington National Cemetery mismanagement controversy.

== Early life ==
John C. Metzler Jr. was born in 1947 to John C. Metzler Sr. and his wife Bernadette. He was one of four sons. He attended schools in Arlington, Virginia, including Fort Myer Elementary School (now closed), Alice West Fleet Elementary School (formerly Patrick Henry Elementary School), and Wakefield High School.

Metzler first moved to Arlington National Cemetery in 1951 at the age of four when his father was named the cemetery's Superintendent. His father, John C. Metzler Sr., presided over the burial of President John F. Kennedy in 1963, an event the younger Metzler remembers watching while standing next to his father. Metzler says he used to play among the tombstones and trees, used to ride a sled down the cemetery's snow-covered hills, and had an "uncanny ease" with the ceremony and procedures of military burial. Cemetery personnel often permitted him to climb on the caisson or ride the ceremonial riderless horse after funerals there. His favorite places were the warehouse (where he would talk to the repairmen), his father's office in the administration building, and the overlook facing the Washington Monument on the grounds of Arlington House.

Metzler lived in the cemetery until he was 19 years old. He joined the United States Army in 1966, and served as a helicopter chief in the Vietnam War. Metzler left the Army after three years. Metzler's first civilian job was repairing airplanes and helicopters. Initially, it did not seem possible for him to assume the same position as his father, as a federal law required that the Superintendent be a disabled veteran. This law was changed in 1973. With more than half of all federal cemetery managers due to retire soon, Metzler's father suggested that he begin training in cemetery management. He served a one-year apprenticeship at Beverly National Cemetery in New Jersey. He rose within the military cemetery management ranks over the years, serving at cemeteries in Arkansas, California, New York, and South Dakota. His last position before joining Arlington National Cemetery was as area director for the United States Department of Veterans Affairs, where he oversaw operations at 40 national military cemeteries.

Metzler and his wife, Kathy, have three sons.

== Tenure at Arlington National Cemetery ==
When Arlington National Cemetery's then-Superintendent, Raymond J. Costanzo, retired in 1990, he urged Metzler to apply for the position. Metzler was appointed Superintendent of Arlington National Cemetery in January 1991, replacing Costanzo. Metzler moved his family (his sons were teenagers in 1991) into the Superintendent's two-story lodge on the grounds of Arlington National Cemetery. His sons grew up without daily newspaper delivery, mail service, cable television, or home pizza delivery because cemetery rules would not permit alterations to the house or because vendors refused to deliver to "Arlington National Cemetery" (believing the orders were a joke).

After assuming his position at Arlington, Metzler confronted a number of issues.

=== Maintenance issues ===
Maintenance issues proved a major problem early in his tenure. Metzler approved an offer by the National Arborist Association to provide free care to more than 650 of the cemetery's trees. "We have over 14,000 trees at Arlington Cemetery, and each year we're able to attend to just a few of them", Metzler said. In 1999, Metzler acknowledged at a congressional hearing that large amount of deferred maintenance (such as a large hole in the ceiling of the Memorial Amphitheater chapel, damaged sidewalks at the Tomb of the Unknowns, cracked and broken flagstones at the columbarium, and corrosion of the John F. Kennedy Eternal Flame) had created a $200 million, 30-year backlog of issues. Metzler said the cemetery had done the best it could with limited resources, and had placed its focus on the ever-increasing number of burials and inurnments which occurred there each week.

=== Expansion of the cemetery ===
There was also increased demand for burial space within the limited grounds of the cemetery. Metzler oversaw the implementation of a $1.4 million plan (developed before his appointment as Superintendent) to clear a former 13 acres (5.3 ha) parking lot to create space for new graves. Metzler said it was his policy to "expand land a little ahead of when we need it so the land can be developed and settled after the construction." Metzler pushed for and won passage of legislation in 1999 which would transfer 37 acres (15 ha) at the nearby Navy Annex and 8 acres (3.2 ha) from Fort Myer to the cemetery. Forty acres (16 hectares) of unused space on the cemetery grounds were turned into burial space in 2006 and 2007 to allow an additional 26,000 graves and 5,000 inurnments.

In 2007, Metzler implemented the Millennium Project, a $35 million, 100-year-long expansion plan which transferred 12 acres (4.9 ha) of woodland from the National Park Service-controlled Arlington House and 10 acres (4.0 ha) from adjacent Fort Myer to the cemetery. Another 4 acres (1.6 ha) of cemetery property currently occupied by maintenance buildings would also be converted to burial space. The expansion would add 14,000 burial and 22,000 inurnment spaces. The Millennium Project expanded Arlington's physical boundaries for the first time since the 1960s, and this was the largest expansion of burial space at the site since American Civil War. Metzler also implemented plans move several utility lines to gain even more space. Metzler's plans were criticized and opposed by several environmental and historical preservation groups.

=== Burial waiver dispute ===
In 1997 and 1998, Metzler also handled several scandals involving waivers which would permit ineligible individuals to be buried at Arlington National Cemetery. Concerned that the cemetery would not have enough space given the large numbers of military personnel who served in World War II, the Korean War, and the Vietnam War, Congress passed legislation in 1967 restricting who may be buried at Arlington National Cemetery. Waivers of these restrictions were permitted, but only minimal rules or guidelines were established for granting them.

The burial waiver controversy broke in November 1997 when the news media reported that United States Secretary of Defense William S. Cohen had allegedly put pressure on the Army and Metzler to allow Republican congressional staffer Robert Charles to bury his father, Roland W. Charles, at Arlington even though he was ineligible for burial there. A month later, a dispute arose over the burial of M. Larry Lawrence, a Democratic fund-raiser and a former U.S. Ambassador to Switzerland. There were concerns that Lawrence had falsified his service in the United States Merchant Marine (a branch of the U.S. military during World War II), and that his role as a U.S. diplomatic envoy did not make him eligible for burial in the cemetery. At the height of the controversy (some Republicans claimed that Lawrence had been granted a burial waiver because of his role as a fund-raiser), Metzler said that he would have granted the waiver anyway. Lawrence had died while still serving as ambassador, and that would have qualified him for Arlington burial, Metzler said. A few days after the scandal broke, Lawrence's widow moved her husband's body from Arlington National Cemetery, making the issue moot.

The controversy led to an investigation of Metzler's handling of burial waivers. The Subcommittee on Oversight and Investigations of the United States House Committee on Veterans' Affairs, assisted by staff from the Government Accounting Office, began an investigation in December 1997. Nine cases were identified where Metzler had denied burial, but had been reversed. In January 1998, as the House investigation continued, the burial of an ineligible National Guardsman at Arlington raised further questions about the cemetery's waiver procedures. The House subcommittee found that record-keeping at Arlington National Cemetery was so poor that not enough hard evidence of wrongdoing could be uncovered.

The burial waiver dispute became an issue again in 2001. Charles Burlingame, a 25-year retired Navy veteran, was captain of American Airlines Flight 77 when it hijacked on September 11, 2001, and crashed into the Pentagon as part of the September 11 attacks. Burlingame was initially ruled ineligible to be buried at Arlington National Cemetery because, as a reservist, he had not reached the age of 60 at the time of his death. The decision caused an uproar. Veterans offered to give up their burial sites to allow him to be buried at Arlington, legislation was introduced in Congress to force the cemetery to bury him, and Senator John W. Warner and others pushed Metzler to consider new evidence that indicated Burlingame was fighting the hijackers at the time of his death. Metzler subsequently granted the waiver, and Burlingame was buried at Arlington on December 12, 2001. Metzler strongly criticized the proposed legislation, arguing that it would permit more than 188,000 reservists and their relatives to be buried at Arlington.

=== Tomb of the Unknowns repair controversy ===
Metzler also oversaw a controversy regarding the Tomb of the Unknowns monument at Arlington National Cemetery. The 1931 Yule marble structure began to incur minor damage as early as the 1930s and two major cracks running around the entire circumference of the monument appeared in 1963 (although the cracks undoubtedly occurred inside the marble much earlier than this but were not visible). The Tomb underwent repairs in 1933, 1975, and 1989 (then later two under Metzler's tenure as Superintendent).

Metzler ordered a detailed inspection of the monument by the firm of Oehrlein and Associates in 1989, which produced a report in 1990. Metzler consulted with a wide number of federal, state, and private-sector preservation agencies and groups as well as U.S. government agencies with jurisdiction over Arlington National Cemetery, U.S. monuments, and veterans' burials.

In 2003, Metzler approved a preliminary decision to have the Tomb replaced, citing a fear that some of the sculptural detail on the tomb might fall off in public and the knowledge that repair was not a long-term solution. He hoped to donate the old pieces to a museum. Public uproar over the decision as well as congressional opposition led to the suspension of this plan. Metzler refused comment on these controversies, but did say that the cemetery wanted the public and preservation groups to provide input and that competitive bidding rules would be followed in any replacement process. In 2008, Congress passed legislation requiring the Army to formally study the issue. The study, released in August 2008, identified four alternatives (do nothing; repair the tomb until it cannot be repaired any further; repair the tomb but begin planning for replacement; replace the tomb). In June 2009, Metzler announced that the third option would be implemented, and that Arlington National Cemetery had accepted the donation of a block of marble from the original quarry which cut the stone for the tomb in 1931.

=== Photographs of burials ===
Metzler faced a controversy over photographs of the burials of American war dead in 2009. In 2001, the U.S. Department of Defense instituted a ban on photography of the arrival of dead American servicemen at Dover Air Force Base and their burial at Arlington National Cemetery. The decision caused a public controversy. Metzler defended Arlington National Cemetery's policy of leaving it up to the next of kin to permit photography (as long as photographers were kept at a distance so as not to intrude on the burial). The policy "has worked well", Metzler said. "Obviously it is traumatic, but how the military does it, with the precision and respect, is a very positive thing. I think the public also looks at it as positive."

== Final years and retirement ==
As Superintendent, Metzler established Arlington National Cemetery's first Web site on April 17, 2000.

Metzler oversaw a rapid rise in the number of burials and expansion in the cemetery's columbaria in his final years as Superintendent. The advanced age of many servicemembers in the World War II veteran cohort and deaths due to the Iraq War and the War in Afghanistan doubled to 30 the number of funerals held per day by 2007. Metzler ordered the three additional shifts of funeral services in order to accommodate the increase. The rapid increase in the number of daily funerals led to a shortage of caissons, horses, military honors teams, and other personnel and equipment, leading several U.S. Senators to question Metzler's budgetary leadership. Extensive building of columbaria also occurred. The first columbarium at Arlington was built in 1980, and a second completed in 1991 just after Metzler assumed the position of Superintendent. Inurnments at Arlington rose from 427 in 1980 to 2,342 in 2003, and cremations accounted for half of the 6,000 funerals the cemetery conducted each year. Five more columbarium structures were erected under Metzler's leadership between 1992 and 2004. The ninth columbarium (and the seventh to be erected under Metzler's regime) opened in December 2008.

By May 25, 2009, Metzler had supervised more than 30,000 funerals in 18 years. He also presided over the funerals of many important Americans. He oversaw the burial of Jacqueline Kennedy Onassis in 1994 and Senator Ted Kennedy in 2009.

On May 19, 2010, Metzler announced his retirement as Superintendent effective July 2, 2010.

Due to a controversy over mismanagement at Arlington National Cemetery, he was issued a letter of reprimand on June 10, 2010.

== Other accomplishments, duties and special appearances ==
Metzler also served on the Department of Defense U.S. Army Qualifications Review Board in 2001 and 2002.

Metzler appeared as himself in 1999 in the episode "In Excelsis Deo" of the television program The West Wing.

== See also ==
- Yule Marble

== Bibliography ==
- Abruzzese, Sarah. "For a Memorial With Cracks, Fix or Replace?" New York Times. November 12, 2007.
- "Arlington Chief Would Have OKd Envoy's Burial." Chicago Sun-Times. December 8, 1997
- "Arlington National Cemetery Expands to Site on Web." Press Release. Department of the Army. United States Department of Defense. April 28, 2000.
- "Arlington's Burial Regulations Anger Family of Hijacked Pilot." New York Times. December 5, 2001.
- Baird, Bob. "Senators Seek Answers." Westchester Journal News. August 13, 2009.
- Barnes, Julian E. "Defense Officials Disclose Mismanagement at Arlington National Cemetery." Los Angeles Times. June 10, 2010.
- Barr, Stephen. "Envoy Post Enough for Burial Waiver, Arlington Chief Says." Washington Post. December 8, 1997.
- Barr, Stephen. "Hallowed Grounds for Controversy." Washington Post. December 23, 1997.
- Cohn, D'Vera. "Rooting Out Tree Trouble in Arlington." Washington Post. October 17, 1993.
- "Cracks May Force Replacement of Tomb." Associated Press. August 2, 2006.
- Enda, Jodi. "U.S. to Move Envoy's Body From Cemetery." Philadelphia Inquirer. December 9, 1997.
- Fiscal Year 1998 Department of Veterans Affairs Budget: Hearing Before the Committee on Veterans' Affairs, House of Representatives, One Hundred Fifth Congress, First Session, February 13 and February 27, 1997. United States Congress. House Committee on Veterans' Affairs. Washington, D.C.: U.S. Government Printing Office, 1997.
- Gearan, Anne. "Admirers of Lee Upset by Cemetery Expansion Plan." Associated Press. July 3, 1995.
- Gehlert, Heather. "Is Beauty a Finer Honor, or Truth?" Los Angeles Times. August 21, 2006.
- Genzlinger, Neil. "The Things Their Families Carried." New York Times. October 10, 2008.
- Gowen, Annie. "Making a Spare Copy of Tomb of Unknowns." Washington Post. November 16, 2003.
- Gowen, Annie. "Unknowns Monument Will Be Replaced." Washington Post. May 26, 2003.
- Graham, Bradley. "Cohen Involved in Arlington Burial Dispute." Washington Post. November 27, 1997.
- Griffith, Stephanie. "Arlington Welcomes Native Son." Washington Post. February 17, 1991.
- Hutchinson, Bill. "Memory's Caretaker." Sarasota Herald Tribune. May 25, 2009.
- Jelinek, Pauline. "AP Sources: Problem With Grave IDs at Arlington." Associated Press. June 10, 2010.
- Kaplow, Bobby. "Arlington National Cemetery Being Expanded." Washington Post. October 24, 1991.
- Masters, Brooke A. "Navy Annex Proposal Causes Stir." Washington Post. July 8, 1998.
- "McHugh Strengthens Management, Oversight at Arlington National Cemetery." Press release. United States Army. United States Department of Defense. June 10, 2010.
- McMichael, William. "Tomb of Unknowns to Be Repaired, Not Replaced." Army Times. June 26, 2009.
- Nakashima, Ellen (July 6, 1995). "Environmentalists Fear Effects of Expanded Arlington Cemetery". Washington Post.
- Nakashima, Ellen (June 22, 1996). "Plan to Expand Cemetery Angers Preservationists". Washington Post.
- "New Angle on Arlington Waiver." Saint Paul Pioneer Press. December 8, 1997.
- Oversight of H.J. Res. 131, National Cemetery System, American Battle Monuments Commission, and Arlington National Cemetery: Hearing Before the Subcommittee on Housing and Memorial Affairs of the Committee on Veterans' Affairs, House of Representatives, One Hundred Third Congress, second session, May 24, 1994. United States Congress. House Committee on Veterans' Affairs. Subcommittee on Housing and Memorial Affairs. Washington, D.C.: U.S. Government Printing Office, 1994.
- Phibbs, Pat (October 11, 1994). "On Sacred Grounds". Washington Times.
- Pickert, Kate. "A Field of Trees and Bones." Lost. December 2005.
- Powell, Stewart M. "Arlington Adds War Funerals." Albany Times Union. December 24, 2006.
- "Repairs Planned for Cracks in Tomb of the Unknowns." Associated Press. October 31, 2009.
- Report on Alternative Measures to Address Cracks in the Monument at the Tomb of the Unknowns at Arlington National Cemetery, Virginia. Department of the Army. August 2008. Accessed 2010-06-11.
- Ruane, Michael E. "Arlington Cemetery's Longtime Superintendent to Retire in July." Washington Post. May 20, 2010.
- Ruane, Michael E. "Bid to Replace Tomb Monument Stalls." Washington Post. January 30, 2008.
- Ruane, Michael E. "For Warriors Past and Future." Washington Post. October 7, 2007.
- Ruane, Michael E. "The Fate of the Unknowns." Washington Post. October 14, 2007.
- Scarborough, Rowan. "Arlington Burial Answers Prove Hard to Come By." Washington Times. January 3, 1998.
- Scarborough, Rowan. "Army Error Put Guardsman Into Arlington Cemetery." Washington Times. January 6, 1998.
- Scarborough, Rowan. "Panel to Probe Cemetery Admissions Procedure." Washington Times. December 10, 1997.
- Scott, Ann and Berman, Mark. "Pentagon Rethinks Photo Ban on Coffins Bearing War Dead." Washington Post. February 17, 2009.
- Sherman, Jerome L. "More Space for Fallen Heroes." Pittsburgh Post-Gazette. November 4, 2007.
- Stiles, Matt. "Ashes to Ashes: Rising Number Choosing Cremation Over Burial." Dallas Morning News. August 9, 2004.
- Van Natta, Don Jr. "New Questions About Envoy Who Is Buried at Arlington." New York Times. December 6, 1997.
- Vogel, Steve. "Arlington Cemetery Gains Land to Expand." Washington Post. October 8, 1999.
- "Waiver May Have Been Given Anyway in Burial." Milwaukee Journal Sentinel. December 8, 1997.
- Wee, Eric L. "Decay at Arlington Cemetery Dismays Lawmakers." Washington Post. May 21, 1999.
- Wee, Eric L. "Good News for Tree Lovers, Not for Arlington Cemetery." Washington Post. March 6, 1998.
- White, Josh. "Honoring a 'True American Patriot'." Washington Post. December 13, 2001.
