= Arlington National Cemetery mismanagement controversy =

2008–2010 controversy

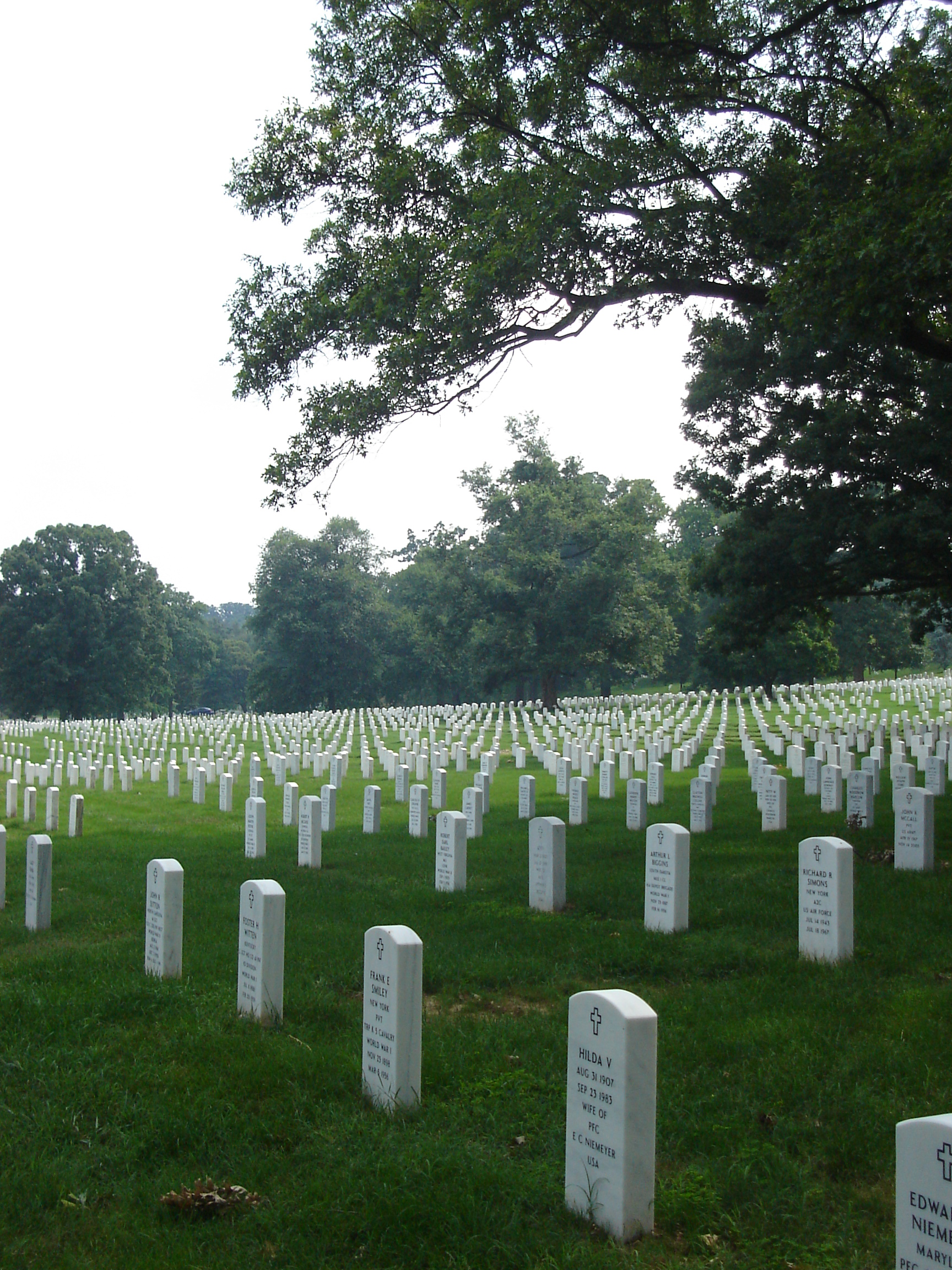
Tombstones at Arlington National Cemetery, July 2006

The Arlington National Cemetery mismanagement controversy was an investigation by the United States Department of Defense into mismanagement, poor record-keeping, and other issues involving the burial and identification of U.S. servicemembers' graves at Arlington National Cemetery in Arlington, Virginia. Questions were raised in 2008, and the scandal peaked in the spring of 2010.

== Background ==
Arlington National Cemetery is a military cemetery in the United States established during the American Civil War on the grounds of Arlington House. Veterans and military casualties from each of the nation's wars are interred in the cemetery, ranging from the Civil War through to the military actions in Afghanistan and Iraq. More than 300,000 people are buried at Arlington National Cemetery, including veterans, their dependents, other casualties of war, two American presidents, famous sports legends, and various other dignitaries. About 125 burials occurred at Arlington each week in 2010.

Allegations of mismanagement at Arlington Cemetery were first raised in 2008. The widow of a United States Army soldier complained that the wrong headstone was on her husband's grave. A Pentagon investigation found that two servicemen had been buried in the same grave. Cemetery workers had also buried the cremated remains of a servicemember in a grave which was already in use, but unmarked. The cremation error was discovered in May 2008 and the remains buried in an unused grave. However, Arlington National Cemetery officials may not have followed proper procedures in notifying the servicemember's next of kin about the reburial.

In November 2009, having learned of the cremated individual's reburial, United States Secretary of the Army John M. McHugh ordered an investigation by the Inspector General of the Army. An article on Salon.com on July 16, 2009, began a year-long series of articles about problems at Arlington, which may have also prompted McHugh's actions.

A later The Washington Post investigation found that the cemetery's administration had been subject to numerous US Army investigations over 20 years, but were unable to resolve recurring concerns with the management of the cemetery. One source of the problems appears to have been that overall oversight of the cemetery was shared by too many authorities, including the Military District of Washington, the assistant secretary of the Army for civil works, the assistant secretary of the Army for manpower and reserve affairs, and the cemetery superintendent.

In one case in 2004, the cemetery's budget director, Mr. Smith, questioned the contracts related to digitizing burial records. He warned an official from the Office of Management and Budget, which temporarily halted spending on the contract. Soon after, Smith said he was harassed by his superiors and eventually suspended for three days without pay. Smith successfully appealed the suspension through his employees' union and retired with full benefits in 2007.

=== Media access controversy and termination ===
Until 2005, the cemetery's administration gave free access, with the family's permission, to the media to cover funerals at the cemetery. According to The Washington Post in July 2008, over the past several years the cemetery has gradually imposed increasing restrictions on media coverage of funerals.

After protesting the new restrictions on media representatives, Gina Gray, the cemetery's new public affairs director, was demoted and then fired on June 27, 2008, after only three months in the job. Days after Gray began working for the cemetery and soon after she had spoken to the media about the new restrictions, her supervisor, Phyllis White, began requiring Gray to notify White whenever she "left the building." On June 9, White changed Gray's title from Public Affairs Director to "Public Affairs Officer." A few days later, when Gray took sick leave, White disconnected Gray's email BlackBerry. In the termination memo, White stated that Gray had, "been disrespectful to me as your supervisor and failed to act in an inappropriate (sic) manner." Thurman Higginbotham, deputy director of the cemetery stated that Gray's release from employment, "had nothing – absolutely nothing to do with – with media issues."

Secretary of the Army Pete Geren asked his staff to look into Gray's dismissal. Said Gray in response, "I am definitely encouraged by any investigation into the mismanagement at Arlington Cemetery." In July 2009 Gray filed suit against the US Army under the Freedom of Information Act, stating that the US Army had refused to publicly release its findings from the probe into Gray's dismissal. In the suit, Gray claims that the probe found that Higginbotham had lied to federal investigators and that someone had illegally accessed Gray's government email account and sent an email in her name. The investigation reportedly had found that when the email was accessed from a cemetery office computer, only two employees, Higginbotham and a contractor, were present in the building.

== Controversy ==
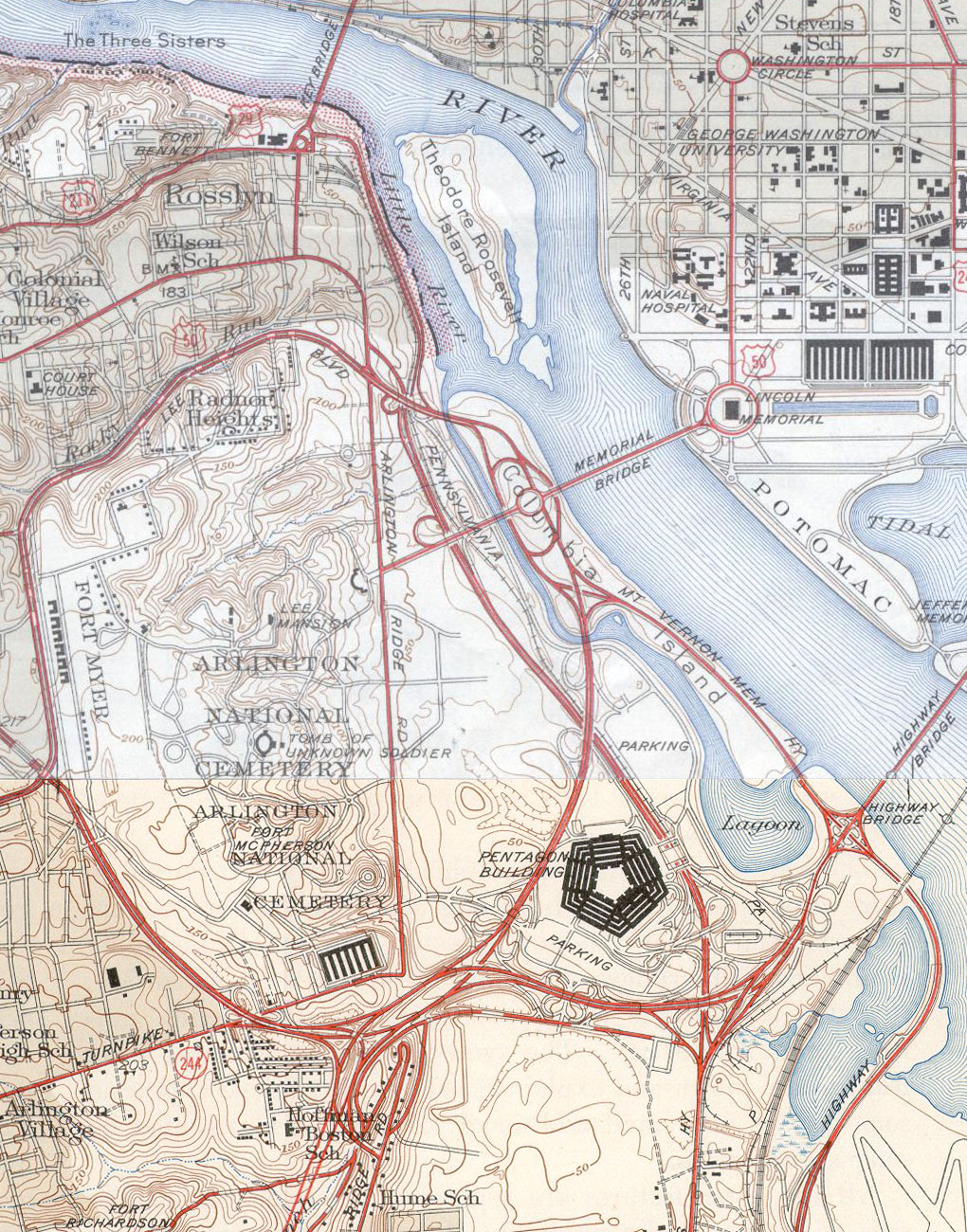
Pentagon road network map of Arlington National Cemetery circa 1945

On June 10, 2010, a Department of Defense inspector general's report revealed that cemetery officials had placed the wrong headstones on tombs, buried coffins in shallow graves, and buried bodies on top of one another. According to the Associated Press, "[Army officials] said in some cases a grave marker was not placed soon enough after burial or records were not kept updated, resulting in uncertainty later about the identities of the deceased at some grave sites." In another case, laborers digging in what they thought was an empty grave discovered a coffin already there, and in another four burial urns had been unearthed and dumped in a landfill. Defense Department spokespersons said they were uncertain how many graves might be affected, as records were so sloppily maintained. A CBS News report said that as many as 200 graves might be affected. Army officials said that the mismanagement of graves and burials had gone on "for years".

The inspector general's report also accused cemetery officials of lying under oath and engaging in sexual harassment. Deputy cemetery superintendent Thurman Higgenbotham was accused of illegally hacking into a cemetery employee's personnel files. An Army Criminal Investigative Command investigation (completed in May 2009) concluded Higginbotham had also lied to investigators about accessing the employee's files. (Note: These findings had been referred to the United States attorney in Virginia, but he had declined to prosecute.) A report which investigated whether Higginbotham had fired a whistleblower has not yet been released. The report said cemetery officials were also negligent in continuing to use a paper filing system instead of a computerized database to keep track of cemetery operations. A new burial management system was to have been installed which would have "triple verified" burial records, but implementation of the system had lagged significantly.

The same day, Army Secretary McHugh relieved Arlington National Cemetery's superintendent, John C. Metzler, Jr., of his position but requested that he continue to oversee cemetery burials and other operations until his planned retirement on July 2, 2010. Higginbotham was placed on administrative leave. (Earlier press reports indicated McHugh would fire both men.) Metzler, who had served for 19 years as cemetery superintendent, admitted some mistakes had been made but denied allegations of widespread or serious mismanagement. Metzler and Higginbotham subsequently retired with full benefits. A reprimand given to Metzler was removed from his personnel file once his retirement became effective.

McHugh also announced the creation of a new post, the Executive Director of the Army National Cemeteries Program, to implement the recommendations of the inspector general's report. Kathryn Condon, previously the most senior civilian in the U.S. Army Materiel Command, was appointed to the position. Metzler was ordered to report directly to the new Executive Director, and a United States Department of Veterans Affairs staff person assigned to assist him. McHugh also established a new Army National Cemeteries Advisory Commission to review Arlington National Cemetery's policies and procedures and provide additional recommendations. Former U.S. Senators Max Cleland and Bob Dole agreed to co-chair the commission. Patrick K. Hallinan, Director of the Office of Field Programs for the Department of Veterans Affairs, was named the Acting Superintendent of Arlington National Cemetery, effective upon Metzler's retirement. In June 2011, James Gemmell, former director of the Fort Snelling National Cemetery, was appointed as the cemetery's deputy superintendent.

On June 16, 2010, The Washington Post notified the cemetery's new superintendent, Patrick K. Hallinan, that the newspaper's staff had found discarded headstones, most still bearing names, in a stream adjacent to Section 28 of the cemetery. Arlington officials are investigating and stated that they do not know why the headstones were there. U.S. Army officials said they would begin inspecting some graves using ground-penetrating radar.

== Ongoing issues ==
Since the close of its investigation, the US Army has operated a call center to answer questions or concerns from family members of internees at the cemetery. Other workers were struggling, as of July 2010, according to The Washington Post, with reorganizing and untangling the cemetery's "antiquated" records system.

A Senate Homeland Security and Governmental Affairs (SHSGA) subcommittee on contracting oversight is currently investigating contract issues related to a failed attempt to digitize the cemetery's grave management and remains cataloging system. According to The Washington Post, the subcommittee had found that the cemetery paid $5 million in government funds to contractors over 10 years for work on the system that was not completed and with which little progress was made. The contracts were reportedly managed by Higginbotham. Upon being notified that he was being called to testify before the committee, Higginbotham immediately submitted retirement papers, dated retroactively to July 2, 2010.

On July 27, 2010 SHSGA released documents criticizing the oversight of the cemetery by Army senior managers. The managers named included Claudia Tornblom, deputy assistant secretary of the Army for civil works, Edward M. Harrington, the Army's deputy assistant secretary for procurement, and Major General Richard Rowe, former commander of the Military District of Washington.

On July 29, 2010 Metzler testified before the SHSGA and took responsibility for much of the problems at the cemetery, but also assigned some blame to staff and budget cutbacks. Higginbotham declined to answer questions from the committee, citing the 5th Amendment, and was dismissed from the proceeding. SHSGA member Claire McCaskill stated that up to 6,600 gravesites at the cemetery could be mislabeled or improperly marked.

In September 2010, the Army found two bodies buried in the wrong plots. The Army plans to check more plots.

In December 2010 the Army announced that it had launched a criminal investigation into the misplacement of remains at the cemetery. The investigation was initiated after the discovery in October 2010 of eight urns containing remains in a single grave marked "unknown." Some of the urns in the grave may have been previously discovered in other parts of the cemetery. The Army announced in March 2011 that three of the sets of remains in the urns could not be identified. In June 2011, it was revealed that the Federal Bureau of Investigation had been asked to assist in the investigation into burial of the urns as well as into allegations of contract fraud at the cemetery.

On December 16, 2010, the U.S. House of Representatives passed a bill, previously approved by the U.S. Senate, requiring the Army to provide Congress with an accounting of all 320,000 graves at the cemetery. The bill also requires a report on contracts issued to digitize the cemetery's records and a study on whether the cemetery's administration should be transferred to the Department of Veterans Affairs. The purpose of the bill was to formally establish congressional oversight into correcting the problems identified at the cemetery.

On 31 January 2011, the Northern Virginia Technology Council released the report of its three-month investigation into record keeping at the cemetery. The report concluded that, "Antiquated paper record-keeping and lack of oversight led to the mishandling of dozens of remains at the nation's most important military burial ground" and recommended that "the cemetery must digitize its records, improve its scheduling system and establish a rigorous chain of custody for remains as they move from funeral homes to burial." Two months later, Arlington officials admitted that the cemetery had for years informally maintained a system of "plot booking" – setting aside choice burial plots for high-ranking military officers and civilian officials – in violation of Army regulations. Although the plot booking system was suspended in 1962, The Washington Post reported in March 2011 that it had unofficially continued under cemetery superintendents Raymond J. Costanzo and John C. Metzler, Jr. until 2010. Cemetery officials said that, due to poor recordkeeping, they had no idea how many plots had been pre-booked, how many pre-bookings were still valid because they had been made prior to 1962, and how many plots were mistakenly labeled pre-booked (or "obstructed" in the cemetery's jargon). Cemetery officials also admitted they had largely failed to inform individuals with pre-booked plots that they may no longer be eligible for burial at Arlington National Cemetery due to changing burial eligibility rules. Cemetery superintendent Kathryn Condon stated, "We do not do reservations, and anyone who claims to have a reservation post-1962, we do not accommodate them. When the loved one or veteran passes, that's when we determine where we’ll bury them."

In June 2011, 69 boxes of copied burial records which contained names, dates of birth, and social security numbers of deceased interred at Arlington were discovered in a private storage facility in northern Virginia. Army officials stated that the storage unit was rented by an employee of a contract company the cemetery had hired to digitize its burial records. The officials refused to identify the company or the employee. That same month, the U.S. Army assigned members of the 3rd US Infantry Regiment (The Old Guard) to photograph every single grave marker in the cemetery. The cemetery plans to upload the images to a database and cross-check the information recorded with each one against paper records. The database will then be made publicly accessible.

In a status report given in September 2011, the US Army stated that progress was being made in reconciling burial records and in modernizing the cemetery's administration. One improvement was the implementation of a telephone voice-messaging system. Officials could not explain why the cemetery had not previously had a voice messaging or voice mail system.

In an investigation to check the status of the Army's efforts to correct the problems at the cemetery, a Government Accountability Office report, released in December 2011, found that the Army had made improvements in the cemetery's management. The report found, however, that management of some contracts by the cemetery's management still had issues. The report did not recommend transferring management of the cemetery to the Veteran's Administration.

On December 22, 2011, Army officials released the report mandated by Congress in December 2010. The report stated that cemetery officials had completed photographing and documenting every burial marker at Arlington and double-checked the photographic records against the cemetery's 500,000 paper records (which had also been scanned and were now available electronically). The double-checks revealed that records regarding 64,230 (about one-quarter) of the cemetery's 259,978 burial sites contained "discrepancies" that required additional investigation. Arlington National Cemetery officials said in the report that they believed these problems were minor, such as typos in names or dates of death, and that another six months would be needed before these discrepancies could be resolved. Army officials said this did not necessarily mean that remains are buried in the wrong graves, but could not rule it out. The report also found that many burial and management records from the American Civil War period are missing, many headstones are in such disrepair that they cannot be read, and that significant changes in burial procedures over the years have made it difficult to maintain records and keep track of burials.

On January 24, 2012, cemetery officials announced that their ongoing attempt to document all the graves and burials at Arlington have led them to significantly revise the number of dead interred there. Cemetery officials say that an exact count (which had never been undertaken before) will probably show closer to 400,000 burials at the cemetery, a large upward revision from the 330,000 previously estimated.

=== Missing funds ===
In 2011, U.S. Army auditors discovered $27 million in unspent funds at Arlington National Cemetery. By January 2012, $15 million of the unspent funds had been accounted for, but another $12 million – authorized and appropriated between 2004 and 2010 – could not be found. The amount was roughly equivalent to one quarter of the cemetery's 2011 annual budget. Army auditors said they could not explain how such a large amount of money could have gone missing. Senator Claire McCaskill, speaking at a Senate committee oversight hearing, said that the money had not been embezzled but had gone missing through "incompetence ... gross incompetence." Army inspector general Lt. Gen. Peter Vangjel told McCaskill at the hearing that his office would continue to closely monitor Arlington's spending and financial controls. Although Arlington National Cemetery officials did not dispute the Army Audit Agency's testimony during the hearing, cemetery officials said the next day that they had accounted for the missing $12 million by reconciling contracts. A cemetery spokesperson said that Army inspectors, federal auditors, and others would again examine the cemetery's books in June 2012 to verify that funds are properly spent and accounted for.

A Government Accountability Office report released the same day found that Arlington officials had made "major improvements" to strategic planning, technology infrastructure, and workforce management. While the report said that there were still problems and that transferring operation of the cemetery to the U.S. Department of Veterans Affairs was still a possibility, the GAO recommended that any transfer would be quite costly and that the Army should be given time to continue to make improvements at Arlington before any decision was made.

=== 2011 infrastructure investigation ===
As part of the ongoing investigation into the cemetery's mismanagement, the United States Army Corps of Engineers conducted a comprehensive investigation of Arlington's buildings, facilities, infrastructure, roads, and other systems between July 2010 and June 2011. The Corps discovered that, for roughly the past 20 years, ANC managers conducted maintenance and repair only when systems were on the verge of "catastrophic failure". This diverted funds away from a preventive maintenance program, which was never implemented.

Critical infrastructure problems uncovered included:

- Inadequate clean water systems for the Visitors Center. Clean water pipes were too small and not strong enough to supply enough water at high pressure to the facility during times of high usage (such as the summer tourist season).
- A storm drainage system more than 50 years old. From 60 to 75 percent of manholes and pipes were completely broken, cracked or damaged, or filled partially or completely with plant roots or silt.
- Cemetery management abandoned utility lines in place rather than require utility companies to remove old lines. This left extensive electric, fiber optic communications, natural gas, telephone, sewer, and clean water systems buried throughout the cemetery (and sometimes above-ground). It was no longer clear which utility lines were functional and which had been abandoned, nor where the abandoned underground lines were.
- Lack of follow-up on storm drainage and underground utilities assessments. Although cemetery management conducted assessments of these systems, the studies were infrequently and inconsistently acted on.
- A poorly constructed and maintained road network. Poor construction methods included low quality sub-bases and improperly placed or missing curbs. It was not clear from the records that the roads were constructed to accommodate the medium or heavy vehicles which often used them. Maintenance issues included extensively cracked road surfaces. In some cases, roads were not repaired by removing the entire road structure but rather by removing only the asphalt or concrete and laying a new road atop the aging, inadequate, crumbling base and sub-base. The Corps estimated that 60 percent of the cemetery's 20 miles (32 km) of roads were in poor condition.
- Poor pedestrian and boundary structures. The cemetery's flagstone plazas and sidewalks were crumbling due to overuse, and the red Seneca sandstone boundary wall (built in the late 1800s) around the cemetery was showing signs of severe weathering and collapse. In sections 27 and 50, earth on the Fort Myer side of the boundary walls was filled up against the wall. This forced the boundary walls in these areas to serve as a retaining wall. Since the boundary wall was not designed for this function, the wall in these sections were cracked and leaning, and some areas in danger of collapsing completely.
- In some cases, buildings and other structures were not constructed to meet Virginia or Arlington County building codes, and were endangering the health, life, and safety of staff and visitors.

To fix the infrastructure problems, the U.S. Army quadrupled its budget for Arlington National Cemetery to $174 million. While the cemetery's $46 million burial operations account remained stable, it added $103 million in construction and $25 million in maintenance funds for fiscal year 2013 (which began July 1, 2012). This included the first installment of an estimated $35 million to locate and remove abandoned utilities, maintain and upgrade existing ones, and build a geographic information system database. Some of this work began in late 2011, when ANC staff began mapping all underground utilities and storm drain structures. It also included the first phase in an effort to reconstruct all roads in the cemetery from the base up.

Fixing the boundary wall issues was similarly complex. With the cemetery due to run out of above-ground columbaria space by 2024 and below-ground burial space by 2025, the cemetery planned to remove some of the low sandstone boundary wall and replace it with 10-foot (3.0 m) high niche walls for holding cremated remains. The increased construction funds would allow the Corps to develop two prototype, standardized designs – one to replace existing boundary wall with new boundary wall, and one to replace existing boundary wall with columbarium niche wall in selected parts of the cemetery. Additionally, a study will be conducted in fiscal 2013 to assess the condition of the entire boundary wall and identify sections which might be converted into niche walls.

Not all of the increased funding was directed at rectifying mismanagement issues. Some of the funds were intended to begin planning for the cemetery's expansion onto the Navy Annex site and for implementation of the Millennium Project (which will convert a substantial portion of woodland into burial space).

Congress gave the Army what it wanted. Congress appropriated $252.8 million for Arlington operations and construction, which included $84 million for the Millennium Project and $19 million for boundary wall issues and Navy Annex expansion.

The Army requested an additional $25 million for fiscal 2014 (which begins July 1, 2013) for infrastructure improvements at Arlington National Cemetery.

=== 2012 inspector general report on improvements ===
In September 2012, the US Army's Inspector General issued a report on Arlington cemetery and the United States Soldiers' and Airmen's Home National Cemetery which found that the Army's new management of the institutions had transformed both, "into premier institutions of excellence capable of setting the standards for federal cemeteries across the nation." The report stated that 96% of the 400,000 grave markers at Arlington had been verified for accuracy as of 17 September 2012. The report lauded a program at Arlington, implemented by new director Patrick Hallinan, which used geospatial technology to track cemetery operations. In response to the report, Senator Mark Warner stated, "Condon and her team deserve a lot of credit for implementing reforms to fix the problems at Arlington and begin restoring our trust."

== Bibliography ==
Notes

References

- Barnes, Julian E., Tribune Washington Bureau (June 11, 2010). "Arlington National Cemetery's top supervisors ousted in mismanagement case". Los Angeles Times. Archived from the original on June 13, 2010.
- Benjamin, Mark (July 16, 2009). "Grave offenses at Arlington National Cemetery". Salon.com. Archived from the original on June 14, 2010.
- FOX News, The Associated Press contributed to this report (June 10, 2010). "Army Forces Top Two Administrators Out Over Mismanagement of Arlington Cemetery". Fox News Channel. Archived from the original on June 13, 2010.
- Davenport, Christian (June 17, 2010a). "Arlington National Cemetery headstones found lining stream bed". The Washington Post.
- Davenport, Christian (June 12, 2010b). "More parts of Arlington Cemetery to be checked for missing or wrong gravestones". The Washington Post.
- Jelinek, Pauline (June 10, 2010). "AP sources: Problem with grave IDs at Arlington". Google News. Associated Press.
- Martin, David (June 10, 2010). "Missing Bodies Plague Arlington National Cemetery, Probe Finds". CBS News.
- McMichael, William H. (10 June 2010). "Arlington Cemetery inquiry results come today". Marine Corps Times. Archived from the original on 14 June 2010.
- Mount, Mike (June 10, 2010). "Army inquiry finds 211 graves mishandled at Arlington Cemetery". CNN News. Archived from the original on June 13, 2010.
- Ruane, Michael E. (May 20, 2010a). "Arlington Cemetery's Longtime Superintendent to Retire in July". The Washington Post.
- Ruane, Michael E. (June 11, 2010b). "Chaos at Arlington Cemetery: Mismarked graves, dumping of urns". The Washington Post.
- Stanglin, Doug (June 10, 2010). "Probe Finds Bad Management, Mix-Up of Some Graves at Arlington Cemetery". USA Today.
- Torbati, Yeganeh (June 10, 2010). "Inquiry Finds Graves Mismarked at Arlington". The New York Times. Archived from the original on June 16, 2010.
- US Army (June 10, 2010). "McHugh Strengthens Management, Oversight at Arlington National Cemetery" (DOC (computing)). United States Army.
